= Index of Cornwall-related articles =

Presented below is an alphabetical index of articles related to Cornwall:

== 0-9 ==
- 2005 United Kingdom general election result in Cornwall

== A ==
- A.F.C. St Austell
- A30 road
- A374 road
- A38 road
- A39 road
- Act of Uniformity 1549
- Agan Tavas
- Aire Point to Carrick Du SSSI
- Al Hodge (rock musician)
- Allantide
- Andrew George (politician)
- Anglo-Celtic
- Anglo-Cornish
- Aphex Twin
- Archdeacon of Cornwall
- Atlantic Coast Line, Cornwall
- Atlantic Ocean

== B ==
- Bal maiden
- Ballowall Barrow
- Baragwanath
- Battle of Deorham
- Battle of Lostwithiel
- Battle of Sampford Courtenay
- Beast of Bodmin
- Bernard Deacon
- Birds of Cornwall
- Bishop Rock
- Bishop of Cornwall
- Bishop of Truro
- Bodmin
- Bodmin & Wenford Railway
- Bodmin (UK Parliament constituency)
- Bodmin Airfield
- Bodmin Gaol
- Bodmin Hospital
- Bodmin Moor
- Bodmin Parish Church
- Bodmin and Wadebridge Railway
- Bolventor
- Boscastle flood of 2004
- Bossiney (UK Parliament constituency)
- Botallack Mine
- Brenda Wootton
- British International Helicopters
- British Isles
- Britpop
- Bro Goth Agan Tasow
- Brown Willy
- Brown Willy effect
- Bude
- Bude Canal

== C ==
- CSM Association
- Callington (UK Parliament constituency)
- Callington, Cornwall
- Calstock
- Camborne
- Camborne RFC
- Camborne Redruth Community Hospital
- Camborne School of Mines
- Camborne and Redruth (UK Parliament constituency)
- Camborne-Redruth
- Camelford
- Camelford (UK Parliament constituency)
- Caradon
- Caradon local elections
- Carbis Bay
- Carn Brea, Redruth
- Carn Euny
- Carn Marth
- Carrick Roads
- Carrick local elections
- Carrick, Cornwall
- Castle An Dinas
- Castle Dore
- Celtic Christianity
- Celtic Congress
- Celtic League (political organisation)
- Celtic Sea
- Celtic music
- Celtic nations
- Celts
- Ceremonial counties of England
- Chacewater
- Chewidden Thursday
- Christianity in Cornwall
- Chysauster Ancient Village
- Chûn Castle
- Chûn Quoit
- Climate of England
- Clio (barque)
- Clotted cream
- Clyst Heath
- Clyst St Mary
- Colin Breed
- Combined Universities in Cornwall
- Commando Ridge
- Constitutional status of Cornwall
- Cornish Assembly
- Cornish Foreshore Case
- Cornish Gilliflower
- Cornish Language Council
- Cornish Main Line
- Cornish Mines & Engines
- Cornish Nationalist Party
- Cornish Pirates
- Cornish Rebellion of 1497
- Cornish Riviera Express
- Cornish Seal Sanctuary
- Cornish Solidarity
- Cornish Yarg
- Cornish and Breton twin towns
- Cornish bagpipes
- Cornish currency
- Cornish dance
- Cornish diaspora
- Cornish emigration
- Cornish fairings
- Cornish game hen
- Cornish heath
- Cornish hurling
- Cornish language
- Cornish mythology
- Cornish nationalism
- Cornish people
- Cornish pilot gig
- Cornish rotten and pocket boroughs
- Cornish stamps
- Cornish surnames
- Cornish symbols
- Cornish tartans
- Cornish wrestling
- Cornovii (Cornish)
- Cornwall
- Cornwall (UK Parliament constituency)
- Cornwall (territorial duchy)
- Cornwall 2000
- Cornwall Air Ambulance
- Cornwall College
- Cornwall Combination
- Cornwall Council
- 2009 Cornwall Council election
- Cornwall County Cricket Club
- Cornwall Minerals Railway
- Cornwall Railway
- Cornwall Railway viaducts
- Cornwall Record Office
- Cornwall Wildlife Trust
- Cornwall and Plymouth (European Parliament constituency)
- Cornwall and West Devon Mining Landscape
- Cornwall and West Plymouth (European Parliament constituency)
- Cornwall in the English Civil War
- Cornwall local elections
- Cotehele
- County
- Crackington Haven
- Crown Mines
- Cuisine of Cornwall
- Culture of Cornwall
- Custos Rotulorum of Cornwall
- Cyder

== D ==
- Dalleth
- Dan Rogerson
- Demographics of Cornwall
- Devon
- Devon and Cornwall Constabulary
- Devon and Cornwall Rail Partnership
- Diocese of Exeter
- Diocese of Truro
- Disused railway stations (Bodmin to Wadebridge line)
- Disused railway stations (Plymouth to Penzance Line)
- Doc Martin
- Dolcoath mine
- Downderry
- Dozmary Pool
- Drift Reservoir
- Duchess of Cornwall
- Duchies in the United Kingdom
- Duchy of Cornwall
- Dudley Savage
- Duke of Cornwall
- Dumnonia
- Dumnonii
- Dupath Well

== E ==
- E. G. Retallack Hooper
- Earl of Cornwall
- Early Cornish Texts
- East Cornwall (UK Parliament constituency)
- East Looe (UK Parliament constituency)
- East Wheal Rose railway station
- Economy of Cornwall
- Eddystone Lighthouse
- Eden Project
- Emmet (Cornish)
- Endonym
- England
- English Channel
- English Heritage Archive
- Eurasia
- Europe

== F ==
- Falmouth Docks Police
- Falmouth Lifeboat Station
- Falmouth Quay Punt
- Falmouth RFC
- Falmouth Town A.F.C.
- Falmouth University
- Falmouth and Camborne (UK Parliament constituency)
- Falmouth, Cornwall
- Federation of Old Cornwall Societies
- First South West
- Fishing in Cornwall
- Fistral Beach
- Flora and fauna of Cornwall
- Fowey
- Fowey (UK Parliament constituency)
- Fowey Gallants
- Framework Convention for the Protection of National Minorities
- Frederick Hamilton Davey
- Frederick Stanley Jackson
- Frenchman's Creek (novel)
- Furry Dance

== G ==
- GCHQ CSO Morwenstow
- GWR 3700 Class 3440 City of Truro
- Geevor Tin Mine
- Geography of Cornwall
- Geology of Cornwall
- Geology of Lizard, Cornwall
- Glasney College
- Glendurgan Garden
- Godrevy
- Godrevy Island
- Golowan
- Goonhilly Downs
- Gorseth Kernow
- Goss Moor NNR
- Grade I listed buildings in Cornwall
- Grade II* listed buildings in Cornwall
- Grade II* listed buildings in Cornwall (A–G)
- Grade II* listed buildings in Cornwall (H–P)
- Grade II* listed buildings in Cornwall (Q–Z)
- Grampound (UK Parliament constituency)
- Great Britain
- Great Cornish Families
- Guise dancing
- Guldize
- Gwithian

== H ==
- HMS Fisgard
- HMS Raleigh (shore establishment)
- HMS St Austell Bay (K634)
- Halliggye Fogou
- Hamoaze
- Harlyn
- Hayle
- Healthcare in England
- Heavy cake
- Helford
- Helford Passage
- Helford River
- Helston
- Helston (UK Parliament constituency)
- Helston RFC
- Helston Railway Preservation Company
- Henry Jenner
- High Sheriff of Cornwall
- History of Cornwall
- Hog's pudding
- Hundreds of Cornwall

== I ==
- Institute of Cornish Studies
- Isles of Scilly
- Isles of Scilly Skybus

== J ==
- Jacobite uprising in Cornwall of 1715
- Jamaica Inn
- Jamaica Inn
- Jamaica Inn (novel)
- John Boson (writer)
- Julia Goldsworthy

== K ==
- Ken George
- Kernewek Kemmyn
- Kernewek Lowender
- Kernowek Standard
- Kerrier
- Kerrier (hundred)
- Kerrier local elections
- Keskerdh Kernow 500
- Kesva an Taves Kernewek
- Kiddlywink
- King Doniert's Stone
- King Edward Mine
- Kit Hill Country Park
- Kneehigh Theatre
- Knocker (folklore)
- Kowethas an Yeth Kernewek
- Kubb
- Kynance Cove

== L ==
- Land's End
- Land's End Airport
- Languages of Cornwall
- Lanhydrock House
- Lanyon Quoit
- Lappa Valley Steam Railway
- Large Black (pig)
- Launceston (UK Parliament constituency)
- Launceston Castle
- Launceston F.C.
- Launceston RUFC
- Launceston, Cornwall
- Levant Mine & Beam Engine
- Lew Trenchard
- Liskeard
- Liskeard & Looe Union Canal
- Liskeard (UK Parliament constituency)
- Liskeard Athletic F.C.
- List of Cornish Christians
- List of Cornish cheeses
- List of Cornish dialect words
- List of Cornish engineers and inventors
- List of Cornish flags
- List of Cornish geologists and explorers
- List of Cornish historians
- List of Cornish musicians
- List of Cornish saints
- List of Cornish scientists and inventors
- List of Cornish sportsmen and sportswomen
- List of Cornish writers
- List of parliamentary constituencies in Cornwall
- List of Sites of Special Scientific Interest in Cornwall
- List of Special Areas of Conservation in Cornwall
- List of adjectival and demonymic forms of place names
- List of civil parishes in Cornwall
- List of farms in Cornwall
- List of foreign-language names for Cornwall
- List of former administrative divisions in Cornwall
- List of islands of Cornwall
- List of islands in the Isles of Scilly
- List of legendary rulers of Cornwall
- List of museums in Cornwall
- List of notable residents of Cornwall
- List of people from Cornwall
- List of places in Cornwall
- List of places in Penwith
- List of public art in Cornwall
- List of railway stations in Cornwall
- List of residents of Penzance
- List of schools in Cornwall
- List of shipwrecks of Cornwall
- List of shipwrecks of Cornwall (19th century)
- List of shipwrecks of Cornwall (20th century)
- List of shipwrecks of the Isles of Scilly
- List of topics related to Cornwall
- List of windmills in Cornwall
- Literature in Cornish
- Lizard Lighthouse
- Lizard Point, Cornwall
- Loe Pool
- Longships, Cornwall
- Looe
- Looe Valley Line
- Lord-lieutenant of Cornwall
- Lost Gardens of Heligan
- Lostwithiel
- Lostwithiel (UK Parliament constituency)
- Lostwithiel Stannary Palace
- Lostwithiel and Fowey Railway
- Luke Vibert

== M ==
- Maenporth
- Mainland
- Maps of Cornwall
- Marazion
- Maritime Line
- Mark Prisk
- Matthew Taylor (Liberal politician)
- Mawgan Porth
- Meadery
- Mebyon Kernow
- Media in Cornwall
- Mermaid of Zennor
- Mevagissey
- Michael An Gof
- Millbrook A.F.C.
- Minack Theatre
- Mining in Cornwall
- Mining in Cornwall and Devon
- Mitchell (UK Parliament constituency)
- Modern Celts
- Modern Cornish
- Mount Edgcumbe Country Park
- Mount Wellington Tin Mine
- Mount's Bay
- Mounts Bay RFC
- Mullion Cove
- Museum of Submarine Telegraphy, Cornwall
- Music of Cornwall
- Mylor Bridge
- Mên-an-Tol

== N ==
- National Association of Mining History Organisations
- Newlyn riots
- Newlyn Tidal Observatory
- Newport (Cornwall) (UK Parliament constituency)
- Newquay
- Newquay A.F.C.
- Newquay Airport
- Newquay and Cornwall Junction Railway
- Nicholas Boson
- Nicholas Williams
- Nickanan Night
- North Cornwall
- North Cornwall (UK Parliament constituency)
- North Cornwall local elections
- Northern Europe
- Northern Hemisphere

== O ==
- Oggy Oggy Oggy
- Old Cornish units of measurement
- Owlman

== P ==
- POW Camp 115, Whitecross, St. Columb Major
- Padstow
- Padstow Coastal Gun Battery
- Pan-Celticism
- Par Canal
- Par Coastal Gun Battery
- Par Docks
- Parliamentary representation from Cornwall
- Parnall's Canal
- Pasty
- Pencarrow
- Pendeen Lighthouse
- Pendennis Castle
- Penhallam
- Penjerrick Garden
- Penlee House, Penzance, Cornwall
- Penlee Lifeboat Station
- Penlee lifeboat disaster
- Penna (surname)
- Penryn (UK Parliament constituency)
- Penryn Athletic F.C.
- Penryn and Falmouth (UK Parliament constituency)
- Penryn, Cornwall
- Penwith
- Penwith (hundred)
- 2004 Penwith Council election
- 2007 Penwith Council election
- Penwith Peninsula
- Penwith local elections
- Penzance
- Penzance A.F.C.
- Penzance Heliport
- Perkin Warbeck
- Perranporth
- Perranporth Airfield
- Peter and the Piskies: Cornish Folk and Fairy Tales
- Picrous Day
- Pixie (folklore)
- Places of interest in Cornwall
- Poldhu
- Politics of Cornwall
- Polperro
- Polzeath
- Porthcothan
- Porthcurno
- Porthleven
- Porthleven F.C.
- Porthtowan
- Portreath
- Praa Sands
- Prayer Book Rebellion
- Predannack Airfield

== Q ==
- Quay Sailing Club

== R ==
- RAF Davidstow Moor
- RAF St Eval
- RAF St Mawgan
- Raid on Mount's Bay
- RNAS Culdrose (HMS Seahawk)
- RRH Portreath
- Rame Peninsula
- Rebecca
- Rebecca (novel)
- Red-billed chough
- Redruth
- Redruth R.F.C.
- Restormel
- Restormel Castle
- 2003 Restormel Council election
- Restormel local elections
- Revived Cornish Stannary Parliament
- Richard Gendall
- River Camel
- River Fal
- River Fowey
- River Gannel
- River Looe
- River Lynher
- River Tamar
- River Truro
- Robert Morton Nance
- Robert, Count of Mortain
- Rock, Cornwall
- Rod Lyon
- Roman Catholic Diocese of Plymouth
- Roseland Peninsula
- Round Island Light, Isles of Scilly
- Royal Albert Bridge
- Royal Cornwall Hospital
- Royal Cornwall Museum
- Royal Cornwall Polytechnic Society
- Royal Cornwall Show
- Royal Fowey Yacht Club
- Royal Geological Society of Cornwall
- Royal Institution of Cornwall
- Royal charters applying to Cornwall
- Royal duchy
- Rugby union in Cornwall

== S ==
- Saffron bun
- Saint Piran's Flag
- Saltash
- Saltash (UK Parliament constituency)
- Saltash United F.C.
- Sancreed
- School of Metalliferous Mining
- Scillonian (disambiguation)
- Scorrier
- Seaton Valley Countryside Park
- Second Cornish Uprising of 1497
- Sennen
- Shadow Minister for Cornwall
- Sharp's Brewery
- Sikorsky S-61 disaster 1983
- Skinner's Brewery
- Somerset and Cornwall Light Infantry
- South Crofty
- South East Cornwall (UK Parliament constituency)
- South West Coast Path
- South West England (European Parliament constituency)
- South West Regional Assembly
- South West of England Regional Development Agency
- Spirit of Mystery
- Sport in Cornwall
- St Austell
- St Austell (UK Parliament constituency)
- St Austell Brewery
- St Austell River
- St Austell and Newquay (UK Parliament constituency)
- St Breock Downs Monolith
- St Catherine's Castle
- St Columb Major
- St German's Priory
- St Germans (UK Parliament constituency)
- St Ives (UK Parliament constituency)
- St Ives Bay Line
- St Ives, Cornwall
- St Just in Penwith
- St Mabyn
- St Mawes
- St Mawes (UK Parliament constituency)
- St Mawes Castle
- St Michael's Hospital, Hayle
- St Michael's Mount
- St Piran's Day
- St Anthony's Lighthouse
- St Columb Canal
- St Mary's Airport, Isles of Scilly
- Stannary law
- Stannary town
- Stargazy pie
- Stateless nation
- Straw Dogs
- Surfers Against Sewage

== T ==
- Tamar Bridge
- Tamar Valley Line
- Tate St Ives
- Tater Du Lighthouse
- Tehidy Country Park
- The Camomile Lawn
- The Duke of Cornwall's Light Infantry
- The Gear Rout
- The Guild of Cornish Hedgers
- The Gwineas
- The Hurlers (stone circles)
- The Lizard
- The Miners Association
- The Onyx
- The Pirates of Penzance
- The Poldark Novels
- The Song of the Western Men
- The Towans
- Thirteen Senses
- Thomas Flamank
- Timeline of Cornish history
- Tintagel
- Tintagel (Bax)
- Tintagel Castle
- Tom Bawcock's Eve
- Torpoint
- Torpoint Athletic F.C.
- Torpoint Ferry
- Torrey Canyon
- Torrey Canyon oil spill
- Transport in Cornwall
- Trebah
- Treffry
- Treffry Viaduct
- Tregiffian Burial Chamber
- Tregony (UK Parliament constituency)
- Tregothnan
- Trelawny Pitbulls
- Trelawny Tigers
- Trelissick Garden
- Trematon Castle
- Tremough
- Trengwainton Garden
- Trerice
- Tresco Heliport
- Trethevy Quoit
- Trevose Head Lighthouse
- Trewoon
- Triggshire
- Truro
- Truro (UK Parliament constituency)
- Truro Aerodrome
- Truro Cathedral
- Truro City F.C.
- Truro and Falmouth (UK Parliament constituency)
- Truro and Newquay Railway
- Truro and St Austell (UK Parliament constituency)
- 1987 Truro by-election
- Truronian

== U ==
- Unified Cornish
- Unitary authorities of England
- United Kingdom
- University of Exeter, Cornwall Campus

== V ==
- Vanessa Beeman
- Vice-Admiral of Cornwall

== W ==
- Wadebridge
- Wadebridge Camels
- Wadebridge Town F.C.
- West Cornwall (UK Parliament constituency)
- West Cornwall Hospital
- West Cornwall May Day celebrations
- West Cornwall Railway
- West Cornwall Steam Ship Company
- West Looe (UK Parliament constituency)
- Western Europe
- Western Greyhound
- Wheal Jane
- Whitsand Bay
- Widemouth Bay
- Wild West (sitcom)
- Wolf Rock, Cornwall
- Woodbury Common, Devon
- Wycliffe

== See also ==
- Outline of the United Kingdom
  - Outline of England
    - Outline of Cornwall
