= Outline of Cornwall =

Ceremonial county in England

The Cornish peninsula is at the south-western tip of Great Britain

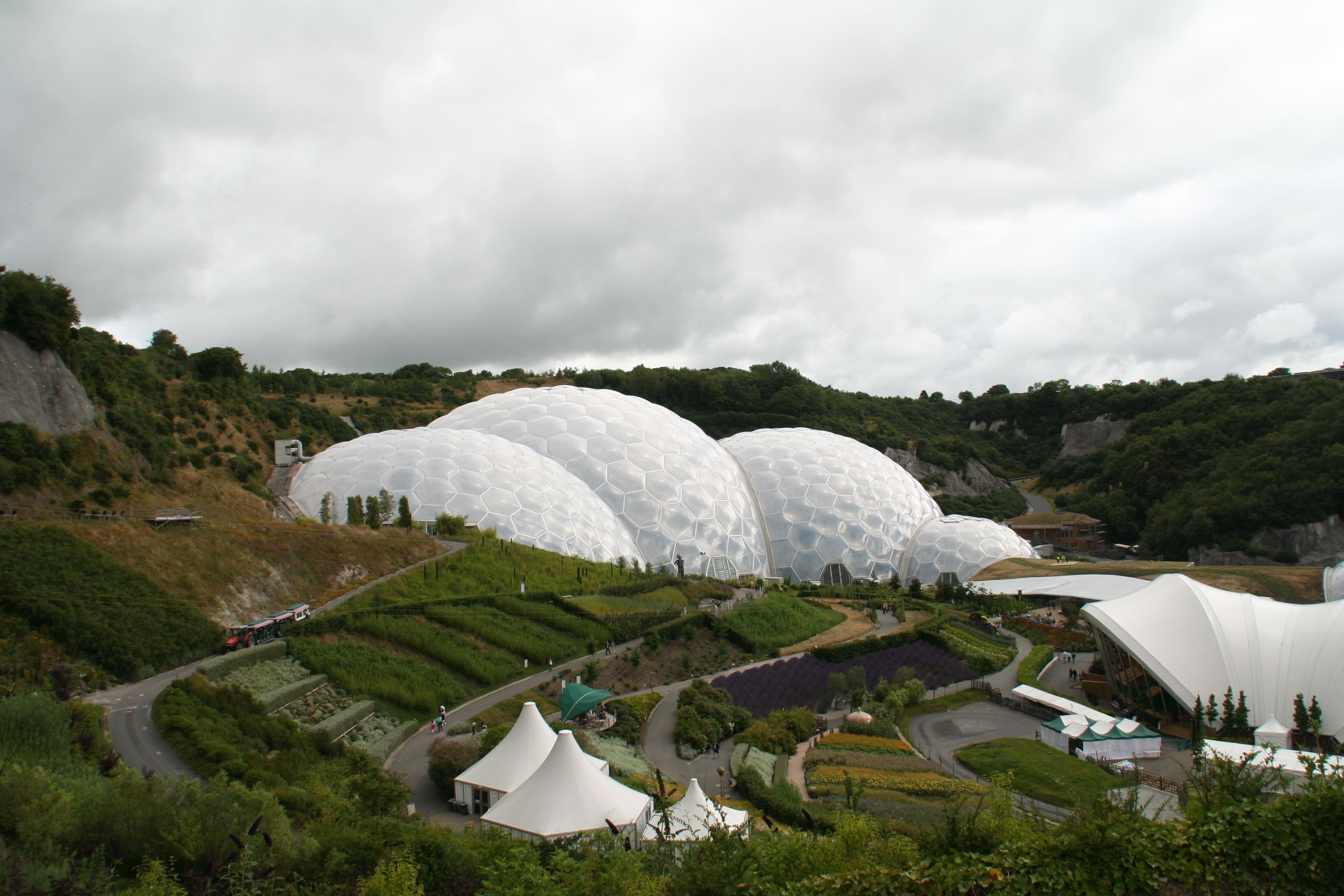
The Eden Project, near St Austell

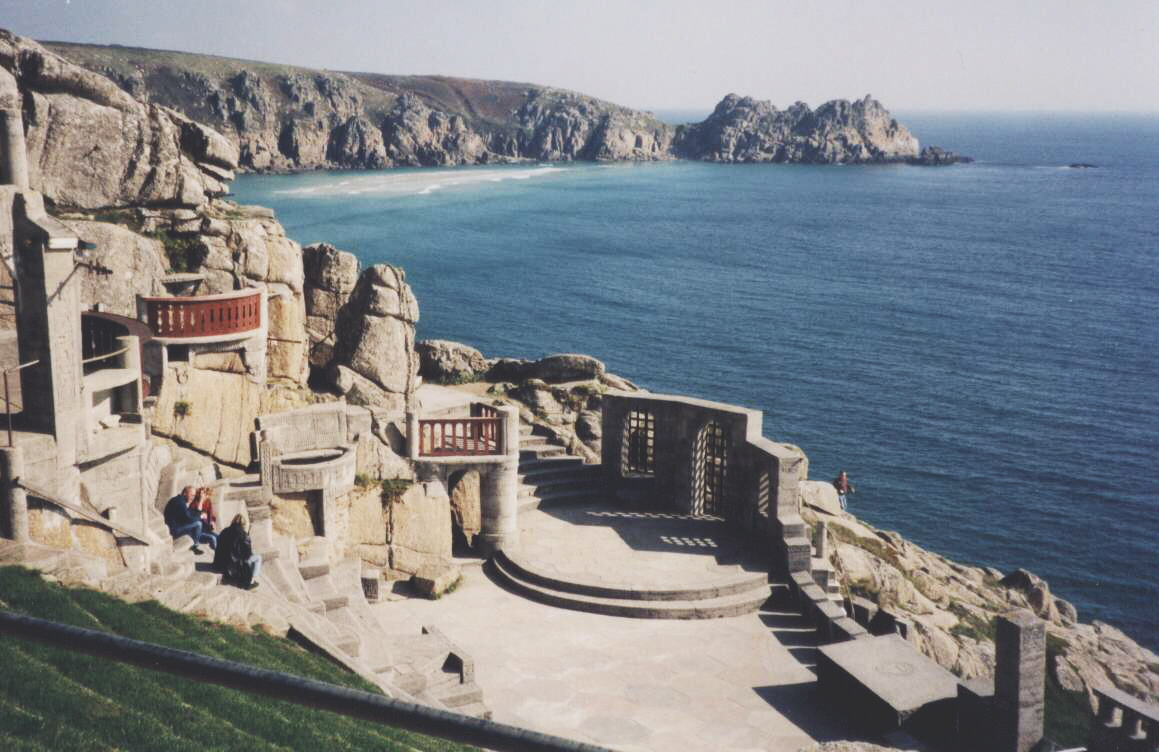
The Minack Theatre, near Land's End

The following outline is provided as an overview of and topical guide to Cornwall:

Cornwall – ceremonial county and unitary authority area of England within the United Kingdom. Cornwall is a peninsula bordered to the north and west by the Celtic Sea, to the south by the English Channel, and to the east by the county of Devon, over the River Tamar. Cornwall is also a royal duchy of the United Kingdom. It has an estimated population of half a million and it has its own distinctive history and culture.

== General reference ==
- Etymology of "Cornwall"
- Common English name(s): Cornwall
- Common endonym(s): Kernow
- Adjectival(s): Cornish
- Demonym(s): Cornish

== Geography of Cornwall ==
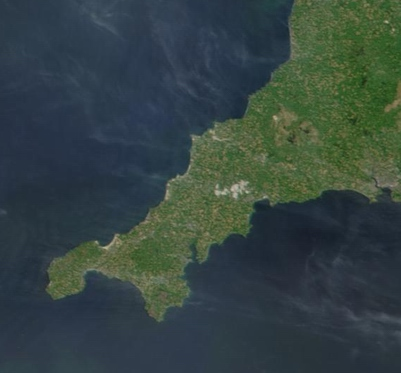

Geography of Cornwall

- Cornwall is a mainland county of Great Britain and part of the British Isles. It reaches from the south-westernmost point into the Atlantic Ocean and English Channel. It is in Eurasia (but not on the mainland) in the Northern Hemisphere.

=== Environment of Cornwall ===
- Climate of Cornwall – see climate of England
  - Brown Willy effect
- Geology of Cornwall
  - Geology of Lizard, Cornwall
- List of Special Areas of Conservation in Cornwall
- List of Sites of Special Scientific Interest in Cornwall

==== Natural geographic features of Cornwall ====
===== Extreme points =====
- Lands End
- Lizard Point

===== Beaches of Cornwall =====
- Beaches of Penwith
- Carbis Bay
- Crackington Haven
- Downderry
- Fistral Beach
- Gwithian
- Godrevy
- Gyllyngvase
- Harlyn
- Maenporth
- Marazion
- Mawgan Porth
- Newquay
- Perranporth
- Polzeath
- Porthcothan
- Porthcurno
- Porthleven
- Porthmeor, St Ives
- Porthtowan
- Portreath
- Praa Sands
- Rame Peninsula
- Rock, Cornwall
- Sennen
- St Mawes
- Swanpool
- Widemouth Bay
- Whitsand Bay

===== Bodies of water of Cornwall =====
- Rivers of Cornwall
  - River Truro
  - River Camel
  - River Fal
  - River Fowey
  - River Gannel
  - Hamoaze
  - Helford River
  - River Looe
  - River Lynher
  - St Austell River
  - River Tamar
- Bays of Cornwall
  - Carbis Bay
  - Widemouth Bay
  - Whitsand Bay
- Coastal waters adjacent to Cornwall
- Atlantic Ocean
  - Celtic Sea
  - English Channel

===== Islands of Cornwall =====
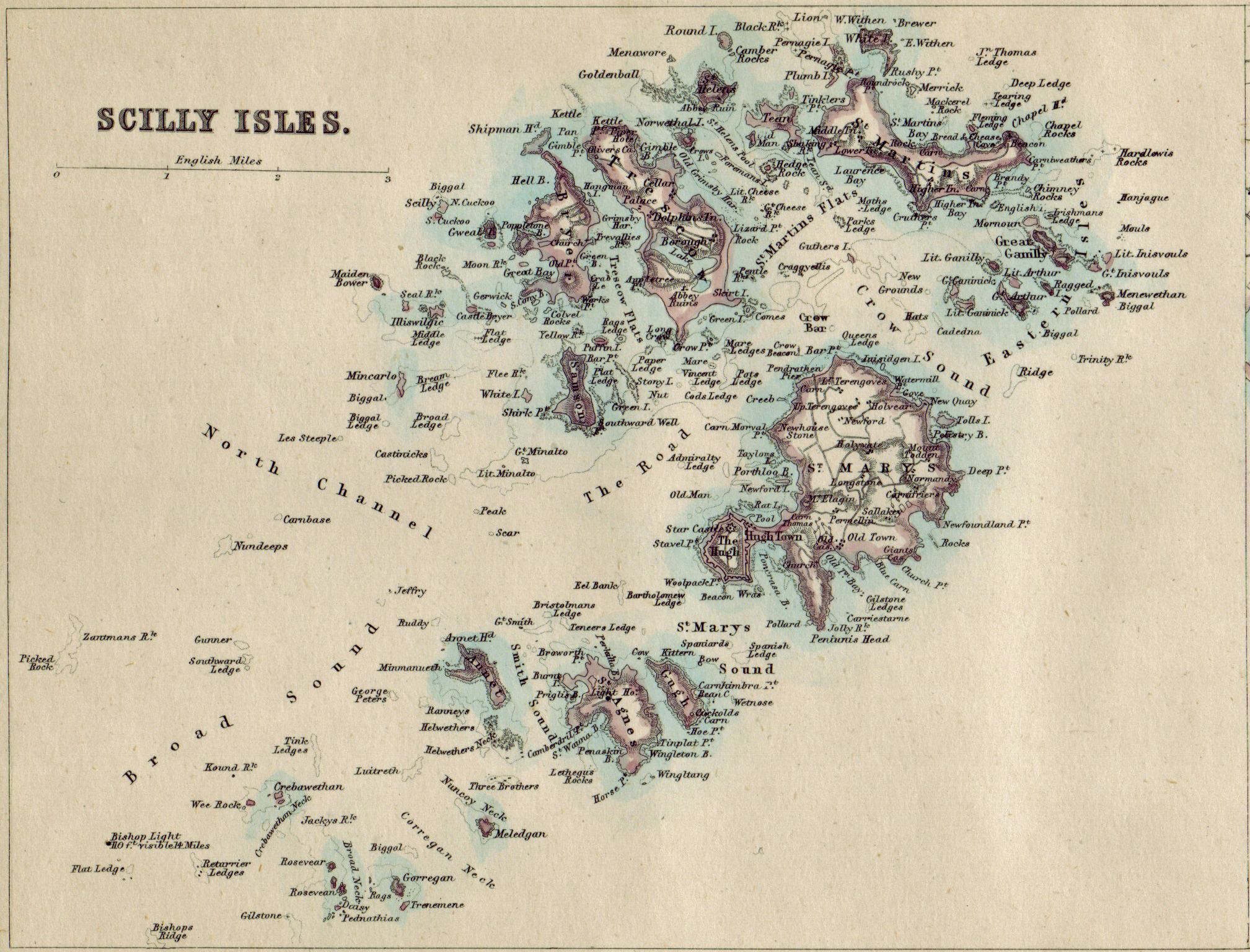
Scilly Isles: map by John Bartholomew

- It has several islands, the largest archipelago being the Isles of Scilly.
  - West Cornwall Steam Ship Company (a company operating the ferry service to the Isles of Scilly between 1870 and 1917)
  - History of the Isles of Scilly
  - Islands in the Isles of Scilly
  - Shipwrecks of the Isles of Scilly: category, list
  - Transport in the Isles of Scilly
  - Sites of Special Scientific Interest in the Isles of Scilly

==== Wildlife of Cornwall ====
- Flora and fauna of Cornwall
  - Cornish symbols

===== Flora of Cornwall =====
- Cornish eyebright
- Cornish Gilliflower
- Cornish heath

===== Fauna of Cornwall =====
- Birds of Cornwall
  - Red-billed chough
  - Cornish game hen
- Mammals of Cornwall
  - Large Black (pig)

===== Wildlife conservation =====
- Cornwall Wildlife Trust
- Frederick Hamilton Davey
- The Guild of Cornish Hedgers
- National Lobster Hatchery
- Westcountry Rivers Trust

=== Places in Cornwall ===
- Population of Cornwall: 536,000 (2014 estimate)

Places in Cornwall

- List of places in Penwith
- Places of interest in Cornwall
  - List of public art in Cornwall

==== Towns and settlements in Cornwall ====
- Cornish and Breton twin towns
- List of civil parishes in Cornwall
- List of places in Cornwall
- Villages in Cornwall
- Albaston
- Bodmin
- Boscastle
- Bude
- Callington
- Calstock
- Camborne
- Camelford
- Falmouth
- Fowey
- Gunnislake
- Hayle
- Helston
- Launceston
- Liskeard
- Looe
- Lostwithiel
- Newquay
- Padstow
- Penryn
- Penzance
- Polperro
- Redruth
- Saltash
- St Austell
- St Columb Major
- St Ives
- St Just in Penwith
- St Mabyn
- Tintagel
- Torpoint
- Truro
- Wadebridge

== Further places of interest ==
indicates Access Land

- Aire Point to Carrick Du SSSI
- Ballowall Barrow
- Bodmin and Wenford Railway
- Bodmin Gaol
- Bodmin Moor
- Bolventor
- Brown Willy
- Camborne-Redruth
- Carn Brea
- Carn Euny
- Carn Marth
- Carrick Roads
- Castle An Dinas
- Castle Dore
- Chacewater
- Chûn Castle
- Chûn Quoit
- Chysauster Ancient Village
- Commando Ridge, Bosigran
- Cornish Seal Sanctuary
- Cotehele
- Dozmary Pool
- Drift Reservoir
- Dupath Well
- Eden Project
- Fistral Beach
- Glendurgan Garden
- Godrevy Island
- Goonhilly Downs
- Goss Moor NNR
- Halliggye Fogou
- Helford
- Helford River
- Helford Passage
- Helston Railway
- The Hurlers
- King Doniert's Stone
- King Edward Mine
- Kit Hill Country Park
- Kynance Cove
- Land's End
- Lanhydrock House
- Lanyon Quoit
- Lappa Valley Steam Railway
- Launceston Castle
- The Lizard
- Lizard Point, Cornwall
- Loe Pool
- Lost Gardens of Heligan
- Mên-an-Tol
- Mevagissey
- Minack Theatre
- Mount Edgcumbe Country Park
- Mount's Bay
- Mullion Cove
- Mylor Bridge
- Pencarrow
- Pendennis Castle
- Penhallam
- Penjerrick Garden
- Penlee House
- Penwith
- Penwith Peninsula
- Poldhu
- Polperro
- Porthcurno Museum of Submarine Telegraphy
- Restormel Castle
- River Fowey
- River Looe
- River Tamar
- Roseland Peninsula
- Royal Cornwall Museum
- Sancreed
- Seaton Valley Countryside Park
- Sennen
- Scorrier
- South West Coast Path
- St Breock Downs Monolith
- St Catherine's Castle
- St Mawes Castle
- St Michael's Mount
- Tate St Ives
- Tehidy Country Park
- The Towans
- Tintagel Castle
- Trebah
- Tregiffian Burial Chamber
- Tregothnan
- Trelissick Garden
- Trengwainton Garden
- Trerice
- Trethevy Quoit
- Truro Cathedral

=== Demography of Cornwall ===
- Demographics of Cornwall

== Politics of Cornwall ==
Politics of Cornwall

- Cornish nationalism
- Celtic League (political organisation)
- Cornish Nationalist Party
- Cornish Solidarity
- Cornwall 2000
- Cornish rotten and pocket boroughs
- Framework Convention for the Protection of National Minorities

=== Elections in Cornwall ===
- 2005 United Kingdom general election result in Cornwall
- Local elections
  - Cornwall local elections
  - Caradon local elections
  - Carrick local elections
  - Kerrier local elections
  - North Cornwall local elections
  - Penwith local elections
  - Restormel local elections
  - 2007 Penwith District Council election
  - 2004 Penwith District Council election
  - 2003 Restormel Borough Council election
  - 1987 Truro by-election
  - 2005 Cornwall County Council election
  - 2009 Cornwall Council election
  - 2013 Cornwall Council election
  - 2017 Cornwall Council election
  - 2021 Cornwall Council election

=== Government of Cornwall ===
- Cornish Assembly
- Cornwall Council
  - Cornwall Record Office
- Parliamentary representation from Cornwall
- Revived Cornish Stannary Parliament
- Shadow Minister for Cornwall
- South West Regional Assembly

==== Local government districts in Cornwall ====
- Penwith
- Kerrier
- Carrick, Cornwall
- Restormel
- North Cornwall
- Caradon

==== Constituencies ====
- European Parliament constituencies
  - Cornwall and Plymouth (European Parliament constituency)
  - Cornwall and West Plymouth (European Parliament constituency)
  - South West England (European Parliament constituency)
- UK Parliament constituencies
  - St Ives (UK Parliament constituency)
  - Falmouth and Camborne (UK Parliament constituency)
  - Truro and St Austell (UK Parliament constituency)
  - North Cornwall (UK Parliament constituency)
  - South East Cornwall (UK Parliament constituency)
  - Camborne and Redruth (UK Parliament constituency)
  - St Austell and Newquay (UK Parliament constituency)
  - Truro and Falmouth (UK Parliament constituency)
  - Truro (UK Parliament constituency)
  - Bodmin (UK Parliament constituency)
  - Bossiney (UK Parliament constituency)
  - Callington (UK Parliament constituency)
  - Camelford (UK Parliament constituency)
  - Cornwall (UK Parliament constituency)
  - East Cornwall (UK Parliament constituency)
  - West Cornwall (UK Parliament constituency)
  - East Looe (UK Parliament constituency)
  - Fowey (UK Parliament constituency)
  - Grampound (UK Parliament constituency)
  - Helston (UK Parliament constituency)
  - Launceston (UK Parliament constituency)
  - Liskeard (UK Parliament constituency)
  - Lostwithiel (UK Parliament constituency)
  - Mitchell (UK Parliament constituency)
  - Newport (Cornwall) (UK Parliament constituency)
  - Penryn (UK Parliament constituency)
  - Penryn and Falmouth (UK Parliament constituency)
  - St Austell (UK Parliament constituency)
  - St Germans (UK Parliament constituency)
  - St Mawes (UK Parliament constituency)
  - Saltash (UK Parliament constituency)
  - Tregony (UK Parliament constituency)
  - West Looe (UK Parliament constituency)

==== Cornish politicians ====
Current MPs

- Anna Gelderd, Labour MP for South East Cornwall (2024–Present)
- Andrew George, Liberal Democrat MP for St. Ives (1997–2015; 2024–Present)
- Jayne Kirkham, Labour MP for Truro and Falmouth (2024–Present)
- Noah Law, Labour MP for St. Austell and Newquay (2024–Present)
- Ben Maguire, Liberal Democrat MP for Cornwall North (2024–Present)
- Perran Moon, Labour MP for Camborne and Redruth (2024–Present)

Past MPs

- Colin Breed, Liberal Democrat MP for South East Cornwall (1997–2010)
- Steve Double, Conservative MP for St. Austell and Newquay (2015–2024)
- George Eustice, Conservative MP for Camborne and Redruth (2010–2024)
- Steve Gilbert, Liberal Democrat MP for St. Austell and Newquay (2010–2015)
- Julia Goldsworthy, Liberal Democrat MP for Falmouth & Camborne (2005–2010)
- Cherilyn Mackrory, Conservative MP for Truro and Falmouth (2019–2024)
- Scott Mann, Conservative MP for Cornwall North (2015–2024)
- Sheryll Murray, Conservative MP for South East Cornwall (2010–2024)
- Sarah Newton, Conservative MP for Truro and Falmouth (2010–2019)
- Matthew Taylor, Liberal Democrat MP for Truro and St Austell from 1987 to 2010 (now a life peer as Baron Taylor of Goss Moor)
- Derek Thomas, Conservative MP for St. Ives (2015–2024)
- Dan Rogerson, Liberal Democrat MP for North Cornwall (2005–2015)

Other politicians

- Mark Prisk, Shadow Minister for Cornwall from 2007 to 2010
- Mebyon Kernow, the main nationalist party in Cornwall
  - Dick Cole, the leader of Mebyon Kernow

==== Law and order in Cornwall ====
- Constitutional status of Cornwall

===== Law enforcement in Cornwall =====
- Cornwall Police Force
- Falmouth Docks Police

==== Royal titles ====
- Duchy of Cornwall
- Duke of Cornwall
- Duchess of Cornwall
- High Sheriff of Cornwall
- Lord-lieutenant of Cornwall

=== Military in Cornwall ===
- Category:Military of the United Kingdom in Cornwall
- Vice-Admiral of Cornwall
- HMS Fisgard
- HMS Raleigh
- HMS St Austell Bay (K634)
- The Duke of Cornwall's Light Infantry
- Somerset and Cornwall Light Infantry
- GCHQ Bude
- RNAS Culdrose
- RNAS Predannack
- RRH Portreath
- RAF Davidstow Moor
- RAF St Eval
- RAF St. Mawgan

== History of Cornwall ==
History of Cornwall

- Timeline of Cornish history
- List of Cornish historians
- Battle of Deorham
- Celtic nations
- Clyst Heath
- Clyst St Mary
- Cornish saints
- Cornovii (Cornish)
- Cornwall (territorial duchy)
- Duchies in the United Kingdom
- Dumnonia
- Dumnonii
- Fowey Gallants
- Glasney College
- Keskerdh Kernow 500
- Lew Trenchard
- List of windmills in Cornwall
- Maps of Cornwall
- Perkin Warbeck
- Robert, Count of Mortain
- Royal charters applying to Cornwall
- Stannary Courts and Parliaments
- Stannary town
- Stateless nation
- Torrey Canyon
- Woodbury Common, Devon

=== History of Cornwall by period ===
- Cornish Uprising of 1497
- Cornish Uprising of 1497 - An Gof
- Cornish Uprising of 1497 - Thomas Flamank
- Second Cornish Uprising of 1497
- Act of Uniformity 1549
- Cornish Uprising of 1549
- Battle of Sampford Courtenay
- Jacobite uprising in Cornwall of 1715
- Cornwall in the English Civil War
- Battle of Cornwall
- Battle of Lostwithiel
- The Gear Rout
- Cornish Foreshore Case
- Penlee lifeboat disaster
- Newlyn riots
- POW Camp 115, Whitecross, St. Columb Major
- Revived Cornish Stannary Parliament

=== History of Cornwall by subject ===
- List of former administrative divisions in Cornwall
- Bishop of Cornwall
- Cornish currency
- Custos Rotulorum of Cornwall
- History of the Duchy of Cornwall
- Earl of Cornwall
- Cornish emigration
- Hundreds of Cornwall
  - Penwith (hundred)
  - Kerrier (hundred)
  - Triggshire (hundred)
- Kiddlywink
- List of legendary rulers of Cornwall
- Old Cornish units of measurement
- History of mining in Cornwall and Devon
- Early Cornish Texts

==== Disasters ====
- Boscastle flood of 2004
- Penlee lifeboat disaster (1981)
- Sikorsky S-61 disaster 1983
- Torrey Canyon oil spill
- List of shipwrecks of Cornwall
  - List of shipwrecks of Cornwall (19th century)
  - List of shipwrecks of Cornwall (20th century)

== Culture of Cornwall ==
Culture of Cornwall

- Celtic culture
  - Celts (modern)
  - Celtic Congress
  - Pan-Celticism
  - Anglo-Celtic
- Cornish clothes
  - Cornish tartans
- Festivals and events
  - Royal Cornwall Show
- Cornish heritage organisations
  - Federation of Old Cornwall Societies
  - The Cornish Gorseth (Gorseth Kernow) (bards)
  - Royal Institution of Cornwall
  - Cornwall Record Office
- Museums in Cornwall
  - Royal Cornwall Museum

=== The arts in Cornwall ===
- Dance of Cornwall
  - Cornish dance
- List of public art in Cornwall
- Theatre in Cornwall
  - Kneehigh Theatre

==== Architecture in Cornwall ====
- Bodmin Parish Church
- Cornwall Railway viaducts
- Eden Project
- Jamaica Inn
- Grade I listed buildings in Cornwall
- Grade II* listed buildings in Cornwall
  - Grade II* listed buildings in Cornwall (A–G)
  - Grade II* listed buildings in Cornwall (H–P)
  - Grade II* listed buildings in Cornwall (Q–Z)
- List of museums in Cornwall
- Railway stations in Cornwall
- Royal Albert Bridge
- St German's Priory
- Tamar Bridge
- Tate St Ives
- Truro Cathedral
- List of windmills in Cornwall

===== Castles and houses in Cornwall =====
- Launceston Castle
- Pendennis Castle
- Restormel Castle
- Trematon Castle
- Tintagel Castle
- Lanhydrock House
- Cotehele House
- Country houses in Cornwall
- Historic houses in Cornwall

===== Lighthouses in Cornwall =====
- Bishop Rock Lighthouse
- Eddystone Lighthouse
- Godrevy Lighthouse
- Lizard Lighthouse
- Longships Lighthouse
- Pendeen Lighthouse
- Round Island Light, Isles of Scilly
- St. Anthony's Lighthouse
- Tater Du Lighthouse
- Trevose Head Lighthouse
- Wolf Rock Lighthouse

==== Literature of Cornwall ====
Literature in Cornish

- Cornish novels
  - The Camomile Lawn
  - Frenchman's Creek
  - Jamaica Inn (novel)
  - Proper Job, Charlie Curnow (novel)
  - The Poldark Novels
  - Rebecca (novel)
- Cornish writers

===== Cornish folklore =====
Cornish folklore

- Allantide
- Beast of Bodmin
- Chewidden Thursday
- Golowan
- Guise dancing
- Guldize
- Helston Furry Dance
- Kernewek Lowender
- Knocker (folklore)
- Mermaid of Zennor
- Nickanan Night
- Owlman
- Peter and the Piskies: Cornish Folk and Fairy Tales
- Picrous Day
- Pixie (folklore)
- St Piran's Day
- Tom Bawcock's Eve
- West Cornwall May Day celebrations

==== Media in Cornwall ====
Media in Cornwall

- Doc Martin
- Jamaica Inn
- Rebecca
- Straw Dogs
- Wild West (sitcom)
- Wycliffe (TV series)

==== Music of Cornwall ====
Cornish music

- The Cornish National Anthem
- Genres
  - Britpop
  - Celtic music
- Bands
  - Thirteen Senses
  - The Onyx
  - Kubb
- Instruments
  - Cornish bagpipes
- Musical works
  - The Pirates of Penzance
  - Tintagel – symphonic poem composed by Arnold Bax in 1919; it is perhaps his best-known orchestral work.
  - Four Cornish Dances by Malcolm Arnold
- Cornish musicians
  - Al Hodge
  - Dudley Savage
  - Aphex Twin
  - Luke Vibert
  - Brenda Wootton

=== Cuisine of Cornwall ===
Cuisine of Cornwall

- Food
  - List of Cornish cheeses
  - Cornish pasty
  - Clotted cream
  - Cornish fairings
  - Cornish Gilliflower
  - Heavy cake
  - Hog's pudding
  - Saffron bun
  - Stargazy pie
  - Cornish Yarg
- Drink
  - Cyder
  - Meadery
  - Sharp's Brewery
  - Skinner's Brewery
  - St Austell Brewery

=== Icons of Cornwall ===
Flag of Cornwall.

- List of Cornish flags
- Cornish symbols
- Saint Piran's Flag
- The Song of the Western Men
- Bro Goth Agan Tasow

=== Language in Cornwall ===
- Languages of Cornwall
  - Cornish language
    - Modern Cornish
    - Unified Cornish
    - Anglo-Cornish
    - List of linguists and writers in Cornish
    - List of Cornish dialect words
    - Cornish surnames
    - Oggy Oggy Oggy
  - Kernowek Standard
  - Kernewek Kemmyn

==== Cornish words and names ====
- List of Cornish dialect words
- Emmet (Cornish)
- Penna (surname)
- Cornish surnames
- Treffry
- Baragwanath

==== Linguistics organizations ====
- Agan Tavas
- Akademi Kernewek
- Cornish Language Council (Cussel an Tavas Kernuak)
- Cornish Language Partnership
- Dalleth
- Kesva an Taves Kernewek
- Kowethas an Yeth Kernewek
- Movyans Skolyow Meythrin
  - Skol Veythrin Karenza

==== Linguists ====
- Vanessa Beeman
- John Boson (writer)
- Nicholas Boson
- Bernard Deacon
- Richard Gendall
- Ken George
- E. G. Retallack Hooper
- Henry Jenner
- Rod Lyon
- Robert Morton Nance
- Nicholas Williams

=== People of Cornwall ===
- Celts
- List of people from Cornwall
- Cornish people
  - Cornish diaspora
  - Cornish people
  - Cornish saints
  - Cornish wrestling champions
  - Cornish writers
  - List of Cornish Christians
  - List of Cornish engineers and inventors
  - List of Cornish geologists and explorers
  - List of Cornish historians
  - List of Cornish musicians
  - List of Cornish scientists and inventors
  - List of Cornish sportsmen and sportswomen
  - List of Cornish writers
  - List of notable residents of Cornwall

==== Noble and notable families ====
- Earl of Cornwall
- Duke of Cornwall
- Duchess of Cornwall
- Great Cornish Families
- Arundell of Lanherne

=== Religion in Cornwall ===
- Religion in Cornwall
  - Christianity in Cornwall
    - Archdeacon of Cornwall
    - List of Cornish saints
    - Bishop of Truro
    - Celtic Christianity
    - Diocese of Exeter
    - Diocese of Truro
    - List of notable Cornish Christians
    - Roman Catholic Diocese of Plymouth
    - Truro Cathedral

=== Sport in Cornwall ===
- Sport in Cornwall
- Cornish wrestling
- Cornish hurling
- Rugby union in Cornwall
  - Cornish Pirates
  - Camborne RFC
  - Falmouth RFC
  - Helston RFC
  - Launceston RUFC
  - Mounts Bay RFC
  - Redruth R.F.C.
  - Wadebridge Camels
- Cornwall Combination
- Cornish pilot gig
- Surfers Against Sewage
- Royal Fowey Yacht Club
- Quay Sailing Club
- Trelawny Pitbulls
- Trelawny Tigers
- Cornwall County Cricket Club
- Falmouth Town A.F.C.
- Frederick Stanley Jackson
- Launceston F.C.
- Liskeard Athletic F.C.
- Millbrook A.F.C.
- Newquay A.F.C.
- Penryn Athletic F.C.
- Penzance A.F.C.
- Porthleven F.C.
- A.F.C. St Austell
- Saltash United F.C.
- Torpoint Athletic F.C.
- Truro City F.C.
- Wadebridge Town F.C.

== Economy and infrastructure of Cornwall ==
Economy of Cornwall

- Agriculture of Cornwall
  - List of farms in Cornwall
  - Fishing in Cornwall
  - Royal Cornwall Show
- Communications in Cornwall
  - Media in Cornwall
- Companies based in Cornwall
- Economic development
  - South West Regional Assembly
  - South West of England Regional Development Agency

=== Mining in Cornwall ===
Mining in Cornwall

- Bal maiden
- Camborne School of Mines
- Crown Mines
- Dolcoath mine
- South Crofty
- Wheal Jane
- Geevor Tin Mine
- Mount Wellington Tin Mine
- King Edward Mine
- Levant Mine & Beam Engine
- Cornwall and West Devon Mining Landscape
- CSM Association
- Royal Cornwall Polytechnic Society
- Royal Geological Society of Cornwall
- School of Metalliferous Mining
- The Miners Association
- National Association of Mining History Organisations
- Cornish Mines & Engines (Pool)
- Lostwithiel Stannary Palace
- Cornish stamps

== Transport in Cornwall ==
Transport in Cornwall

=== Air travel in Cornwall ===
- Bodmin Airfield
- British International Helicopters
- Isles of Scilly Skybus
- Land's End Airport
- Newquay Airport
- Penzance Heliport
- Perranporth Airfield
- St Mary's Airport
- Tresco Heliport
- Truro Aerodrome

=== Rail transport in Cornwall ===
==== Railways (present day) ====
- Atlantic Coast Line, Cornwall
- Cornish Main Line
- Devon and Cornwall Rail Partnership
- Looe Valley Line
- Maritime Line
- Railway stations in Cornwall
- St Ives Bay Line
- Tamar Valley Line

==== Railways (heritage & history) ====
- Bodmin and Wadebridge Railway
- Cornish Riviera Express
- Cornwall Minerals Railway
- Cornwall Railway
- Cornwall Railway viaducts
- GWR 3700 Class 3440 City of Truro
- Disused railway stations (Bodmin to Wadebridge line)
- Disused railway stations (Plymouth to Penzance Line)
- Helston Railway Preservation Company
- Lostwithiel and Fowey Railway
- Newquay and Cornwall Junction Railway
- Truro and Newquay Railway
- Treffry Viaduct
- West Cornwall Railway

==== Roads in Cornwall ====
- A30
- A374
- A38
- A39 (Atlantic Highway)

==== Buses and coaches in Cornwall ====
- Go Cornwall Bus
- Kernow Buses (run by First South West)
- Truronian
- Western Greyhound

==== Maritime transport in Cornwall ====
===== Ships and boats in Cornwall =====
- Clio (barque)
- Falmouth Lifeboat Station
- Falmouth Quay Punt
- List of shipwrecks of Cornwall
- Penlee Lifeboat Station
- Scillonian (disambiguation)
- Spirit of Mystery
- Torpoint Ferry

===== Canals =====
- Bude Canal
- Liskeard & Looe Union Canal
- Par Canal
- Parnall's Canal
- St Columb Canal

== Healthcare in Cornwall ==
Healthcare in Cornwall

- Ambulance services in Cornwall
  - Cornwall Air Ambulance
  - South Western Ambulance Service
- Health services in Cornwall
  - Cornwall Partnership NHS Foundation Trust
  - Peninsula Community Health
  - Royal Cornwall Hospitals NHS Trust
- Hospitals in Cornwall
  - Bodmin Hospital
  - Camborne Redruth Community Hospital
  - Royal Cornwall Hospital
  - Royal Cornwall Infirmary
  - St Michael's Hospital, Hayle
  - St Lawrence's Hospital, Bodmin
  - West Cornwall Hospital
- Hospices in Cornwall
  - Children's Hospice South West
  - Cornwall Hospice Care

== Education in Cornwall ==
- List of museums in Cornwall
- List of schools in Cornwall

Primary education

- Five Islands Academy
- St Mabyn Church of England Primary School

Secondary education

- Callywith College
- Cornwall College
- Falmouth School
- Glasney College
- Humphry Davy School
- Penair School
- Poltair School
- Redruth School
- Richard Lander School
- Truro and Penwith College
- Truro High School
- Truro School

Tertiary education

- Camborne School of Mines
- Combined Universities in Cornwall
- Falmouth University
- Institute of Cornish Studies
- University of Exeter, Cornwall Campus

== See also ==
- Index of Cornwall-related articles
- Outline of the United Kingdom
  - Outline of England
- List of railway stations in Cornwall
- List of residents of Penzance
- List of Sites of Special Scientific Interest in Cornwall
- List of Special Areas of Conservation in Cornwall
- List of foreign-language names for Cornwall
- Kernow - Cornish language Wikipedia
