= White Cross, Cornwall =

Coordinates: 50°24′N 4°58′W

White Cross
- Hamlet
- Location within Cornwall
- OS grid reference: SW 8910 5983
- Civil parish: Colan
- Unitary authority: Cornwall
- Ceremonial county: Cornwall
- Region: South West
- Country: England
- Sovereign state: United Kingdom
- Post town: ST COLUMB
- Postcode district: TR8
- Police: Devon and Cornwall
- Fire: Cornwall
- Ambulance: South Western
- UK Parliament: St Austell and Newquay

White Cross is a hamlet in mid Cornwall, England, United Kingdom. It lies on the border between the three parishes of Colan, St Enoder, and St Columb Major. It is on the A392 between Indian Queens and Newquay.

POW Camp 115, Whitecross, St. Columb Major was situated near the village.
