= Transport in Cornwall =

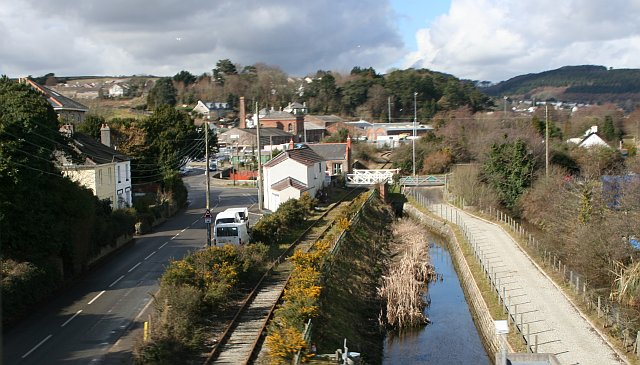
Road, railway and canal side by side at Par harbour.

The evolution of transport in Cornwall has been shaped by the county's strong maritime, mining and industrial traditions and much of the transport infrastructure reflects this heritage.

However, with the decline in mining and industry over the last century and more, transport provision in Cornwall has increasingly focused on the needs of tourism and holiday-makers. An example of this is the improvement of the A30 trunk road; the substantial dual carriageway sections have greatly relieved summer traffic congestion but are very under-used in winter.

In the case of the railway system, although Cornwall has lost some of its rail network since nationalisation in 1948, it has fared better than many other rural areas of England. In part, this is because many Cornish lines serve holiday destinations and are visitor attractions in their own right.

== General situation ==
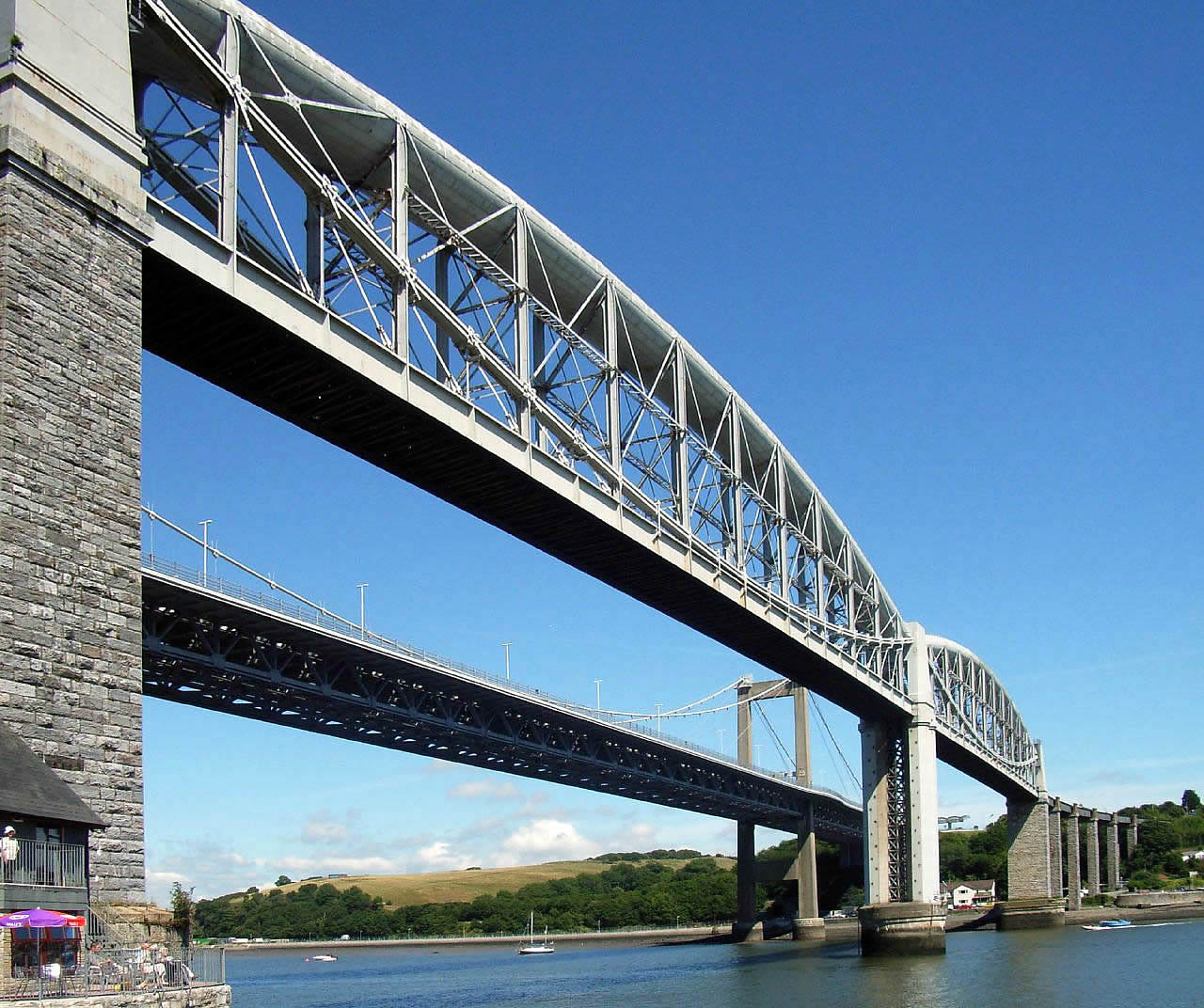
The Tamar Bridge (background) and Royal Albert Bridge (foreground) carry road and rail links into Cornwall

The inland transport network consists of longitudinal spines (the A30, A38 and A39 trunk roads (though the A39 is no longer designated as such) and the former Great Western Railway main line through Cornwall) from which secondary roads and railway branch lines radiate to ports and resorts on the coast.

As a maritime county, ports and sea transport were once vital to Cornwall's prosperity: however, they are less important now. Fishing, too, has traditionally been a core industry and Newlyn remains one of the largest fishing ports in southern Britain and a major centre for distribution of fish and shell-fish to continental Europe. Fish from the ports was an important component of the freight traffic for Cornish railways although now the fish is conveyed by road.

As well as Newlyn, several other ports (notably Padstow) and also Newquay cater for commercial fishing on a smaller scale. Many more small harbours cater to sport angling, again reflecting the county's reliance on tourism and leisure.

The coastline of Cornwall is deeply indented (particularly in the south) by estuaries and rias (flooded river valleys) so Cornwall's ferry crossings are an important part of today's transport mix. The Isles of Scilly are accessible by sea from Penzance.

== Road transport in Cornwall ==
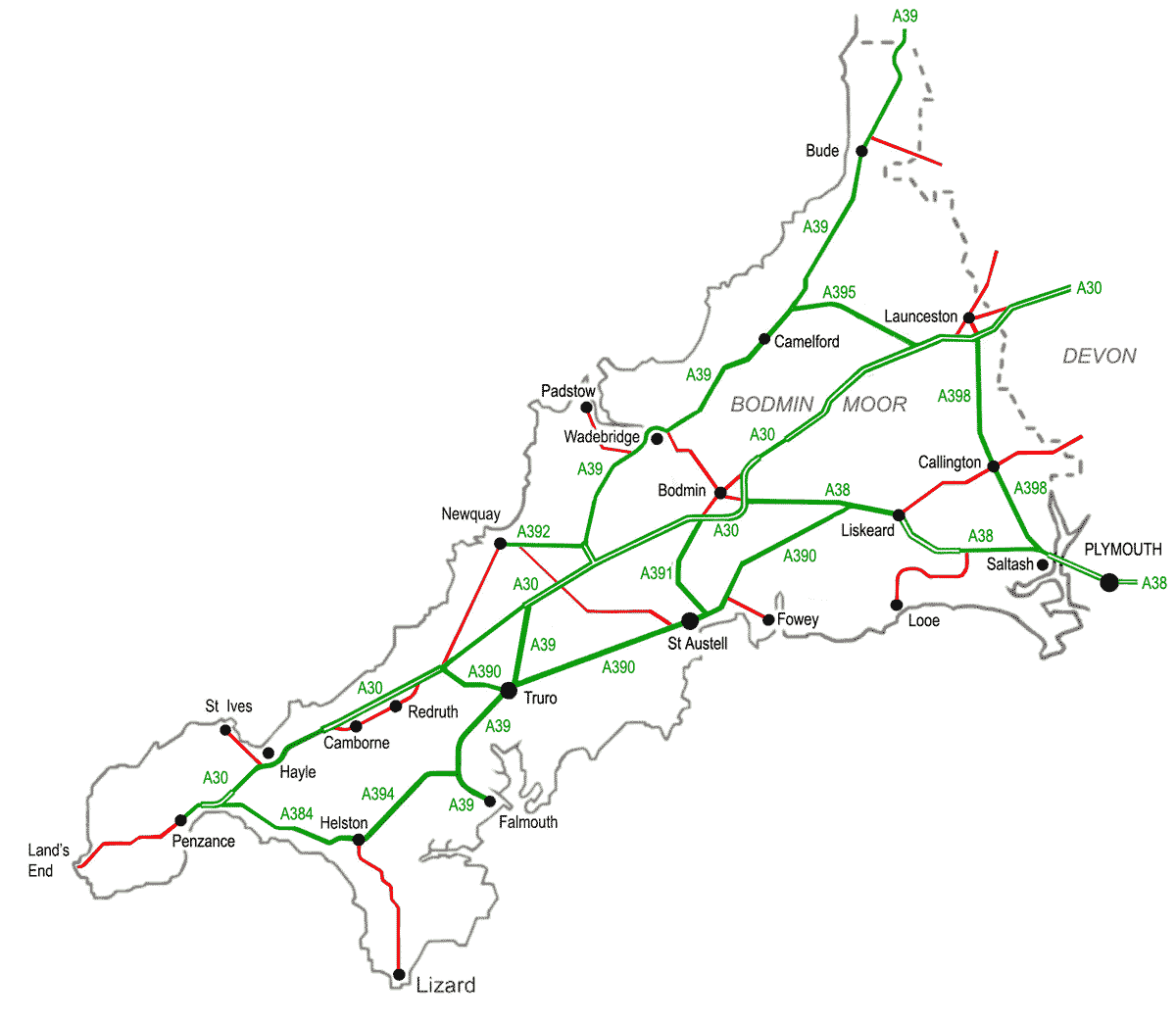
Trunk roads in Cornwall; click to enlarge

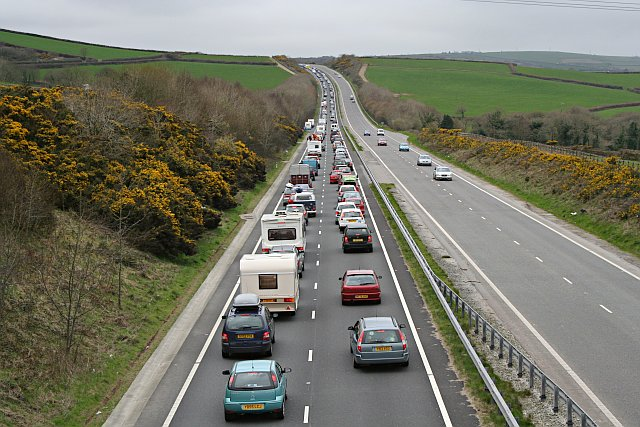
The A30, the main east–west route through Cornwall

Cornwall is one of the few English counties with no motorways. However, trunk road access to and from the rest of the UK is at the heart of Cornwall's transport infrastructure and it is now possible to drive on uninterrupted dual carriageway from Glasgow to Bodmin Moor.

The principal road routes into Cornwall for both freight and passenger vehicles are the A30 from Exeter and the A38 from Plymouth and south Devon.

A30: The A30 between Exeter and Penzance is part of the Trans-European Road Network and is regarded by the Highways Agency as a strategic route corridor to the south west. The route has been greatly improved and upgraded in the past thirty years. There were only two short sections of dual carriageway on the 111 miles (179 km) of the A30 between Exeter and Penzance before 1976, but today only 20 miles (32 km) of single carriageway remain (one short stretch on Bodmin Moor and the rest in west Cornwall).

A38: A38 traffic into south-east Cornwall used to face severe delays at the Torpoint ferry (see below) across the River Tamar but this was relieved by the opening of the Tamar Bridge (a toll suspension bridge) in 1961. According to the Highways Agency, ...it is not envisaged that the A38 has, or will have, a strategic role to rival that of the A30; rather it has a sub-regional role to provide access between Cornwall and Plymouth and other parts of South Devon. Nonetheless, the A38 provides an alternative route for traffic from Exeter and the M5 motorway heading to south-east Cornwall. The increase in traffic warranted two extra lanes being added to the Tamar Bridge in 2001 (the first suspension bridge in the world to be widened while remaining open to traffic).

Other routes into Cornwall include the A39 from Barnstaple and Bideford to Bude and on to Wadebridge and south-west Cornwall; the A3072 from Hatherleigh and central Devon to Bude; and the A390 from Tavistock to Callington and Liskeard.

=== Early routes ===
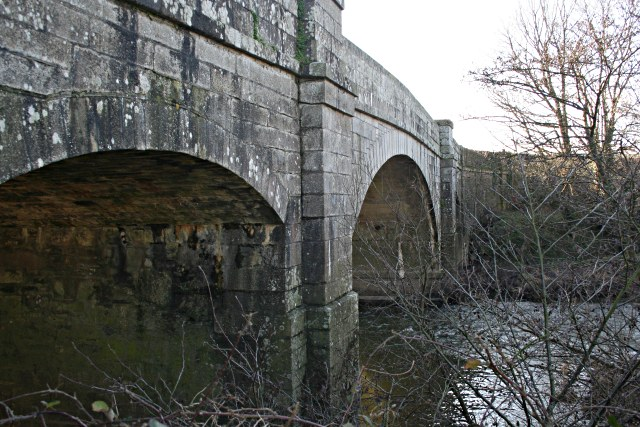
Polson (Polston) Bridge

In prehistoric times there were trackways across mid-Cornwall, trade routes between Ireland and Brittany. These arose because of the need to avoid the sea passage round Land's End. From Hayle on the north coast the track crossed to Mount's Bay; from the Camel estuary there were several routes. These went to Fowey, somewhere near Pentewan and to the River Fal. The east–west route was diverted northwards because of the obstacle of Bodmin Moor. From Mount's Bay it crossed the Carnmenellis and Hensbarrow moorlands and probably passed to the northwest of Bodmin Moor to connect with a route into the rest of Britain near Kilkhampton. It is likely that primitive main roads were in existence by the beginning of the 14th century. In medieval times a road known as the Royal Cornish Way began with a crossing of the River Tamar by Polston Bridge near Launceston. This bridge was probably built soon after the Norman conquerors had established a castle at Launceston. The medieval road then went by Downhead and Davidstow through Camelford (established as a borough in 1259) to the ford across the River Camel at Wade (Wadebridge) where a weekly market and two annual fairs were established in 1312. It then continued through St Columb Major and Mitchell to Truro. Another medieval way into Cornwall was by the Cremyll ferry from Plymouth and then by Millbrook and Crafthole to Looe where Looe bridge had been built in 1411–36.

=== Traffic flows and improvements ===
Data collected on the A30 Launceston bypass shows that annual average daily traffic rose from 14,318 in 1995 to 20,842 in 2005. As well as increased traffic from outside the county, Cornwall's resident population has grown more rapidly than average. The number of people living in Cornwall increased by 32 per cent between 1971 and 2001, compared to an average increase of 6.5 per cent in England as a whole.

Despite the very substantial increase in resident and visiting traffic, road improvements have reduced congestion on the major routes.

In particular, dualling of the A30 has relieved most of the congestion as towns along the route which were formally bottlenecks have been bypassed. Notable schemes include: Launceston bypass (1975); Bodmin bypass (1977); and the Fraddon and Indian Queens bypass and associated A39 spur(1995).

The most recent scheme is 7 miles of new dual carriageway to the north of Goss Moor. Opened in July 2007, the new road relieved a notoriously congested single carriageway stretch which included a bottleneck at the bridge carrying the Par-Newquay railway over the road. This scheme has reduced congestion, shortened journey times and reduced traffic volumes on the A39 and the A390. More than 30,000 vehicles a day use the new road on weekdays and up to 43,000 on Saturdays in August.

As well as dualling, villages have been bypassed on sections that remain single carriageway; for example, the mile of bypass opened in 1991 at Zelah on the Carland Cross to Chiverton Cross section.

=== Bus services ===
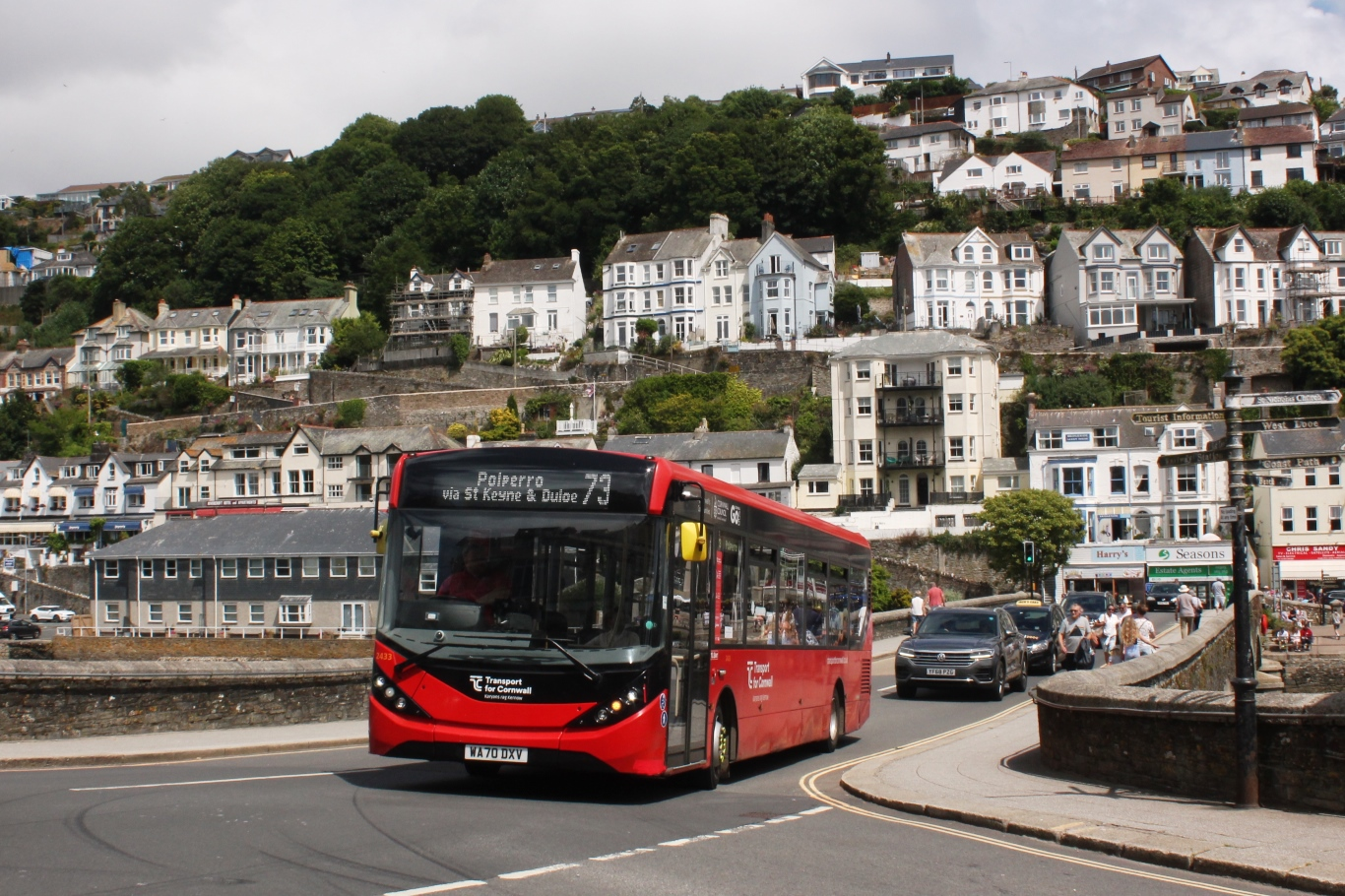
Go Cornwall Bus/Transport for Cornwall bus service on Looe bridge in 2023

Plymouth Citybus and Go Cornwall Bus, Stagecoach South West, Hopley's Coaches and Summercourt Travel also operate services around the county including services to Devon.

Since Cornwall Council gained devolved transport responsibilities they have launched the Transport for Cornwall brand and have introduced an integrated ticketing system across operators and secured increased funding for new buses in Cornwall.

A park and ride express bus service operates in Truro, transporting passengers from Threemilestone to Truro city centre.

== Rail transport in Cornwall ==
=== History ===
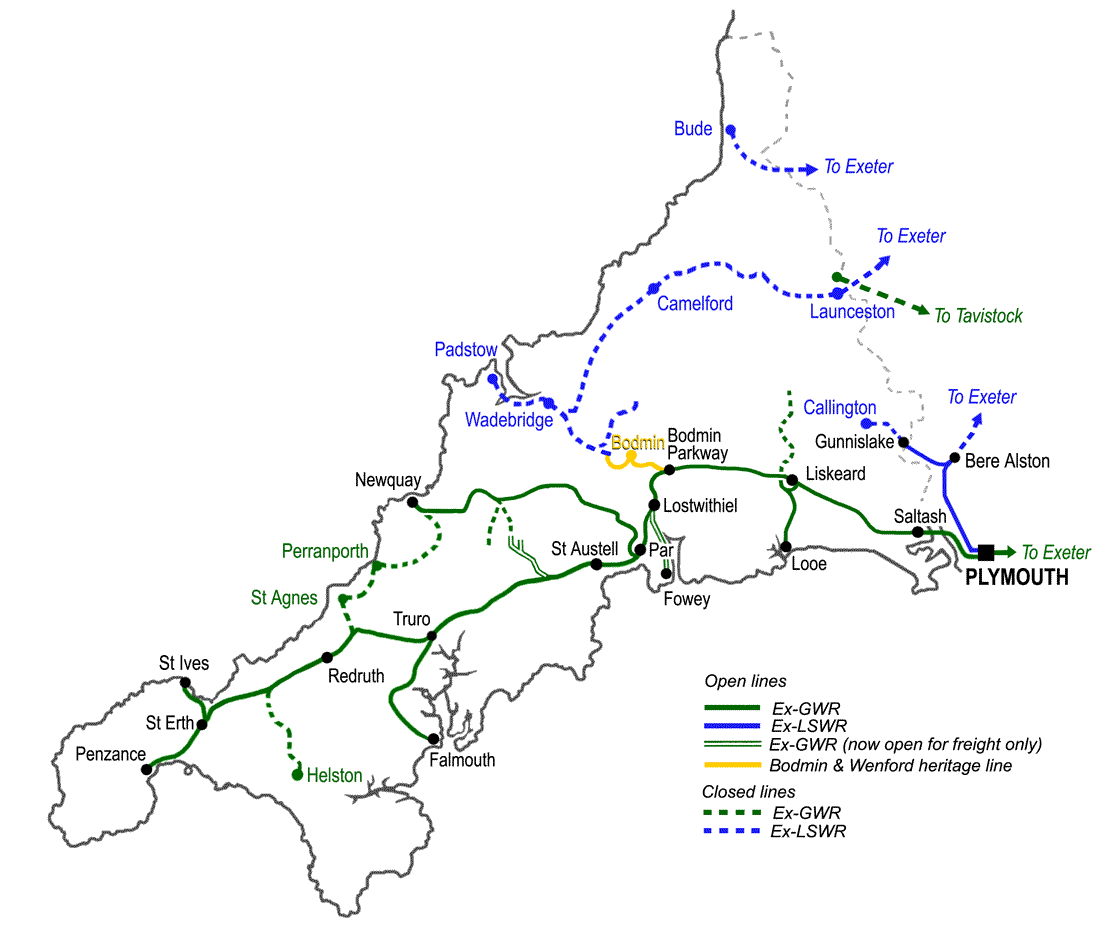
The extent of the former railway network in Cornwall

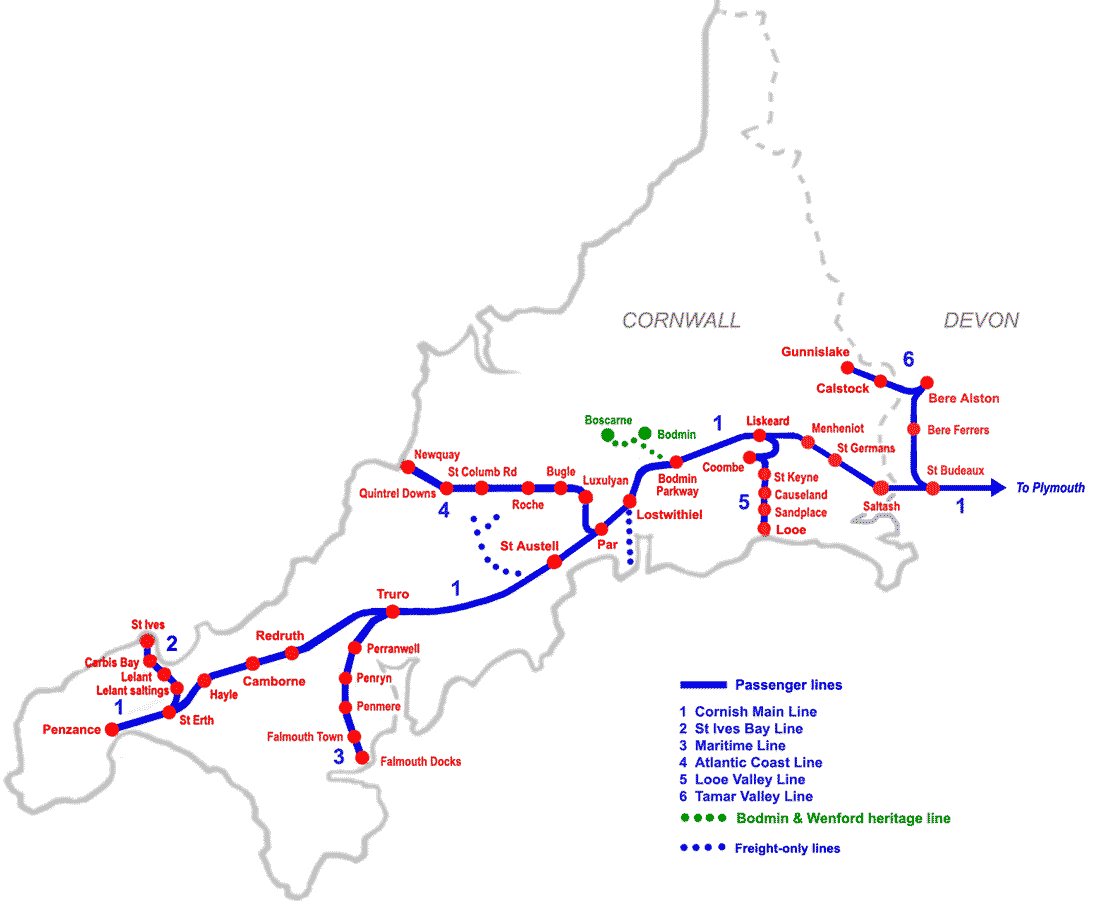
Railways and stations in Cornwall as of 2009

Railways remain a core part of the county's transport infrastructure, with 37 stations within it.

Cornish engineer Richard Trevithick (who was developing high pressure stationary steam engines for Cornwall's industries) produced the world's first locomotive in 1802 by mounting an engine on wheels to run on rails. A horse-worked tramway was opened from Poldice mine to the harbour at Portreath in 1809 and many similar lines were then built linking mines with ports. The first steam-powered railway in Cornwall, the Bodmin and Wadebridge Railway, opened on 30 September 1834 less than ten years after the world's earliest steam railway, the Stockton and Darlington.

At its height, the railway system in Cornwall resembled the road network – central spines with branches to the coast. The Great Western Railway's main line from Plymouth to Penzance loosely followed the route of the A38 from Plymouth to the south of Bodmin then that of the A30 to Truro, Redruth and Penzance from 1859; the London & South Western Railway (LSWR)'s system in north Cornwall resembled that of the A39 beyond Camelford from 1895 (see maps).

The Cornish rail network suffered a substantial reduction during the 1960s due to the Beeching cuts. North Cornwall was hardest hit – the entire former North Cornwall Railway system which served Bude, Camelford, Wadebridge and Padstow was closed on 3 October 1966 (although the Wadebridge-Padstow section was retained for a further three months).

Further west, the line from Chacewater to St Agnes and Newquay closed on 4 February 1963 after just 60 years of existence. The Helston branch (which left the main line at Gwinear Road) closed to passengers on 3 October 1962 and to goods traffic two years later.

Today, the former Great Western Railway Penzance-Plymouth main line remains open and four ex-GWR branch lines (together with the ex-LSWR Callington branch as far as Gunnislake) survived the Beeching cuts, although Beeching had proposed the closure of the branches to Looe and St Ives. This network provides long-distance rail services from stations on the main line directly to London and to many other parts of England and Wales. These services are fed by the branch lines. Exceptionally, the Newquay branch continues to provide intercity services between May and September. As well as long distance and holiday services, commuter and 'shopper' trains from Cornwall serve Plymouth, Devon.

=== Lines ===
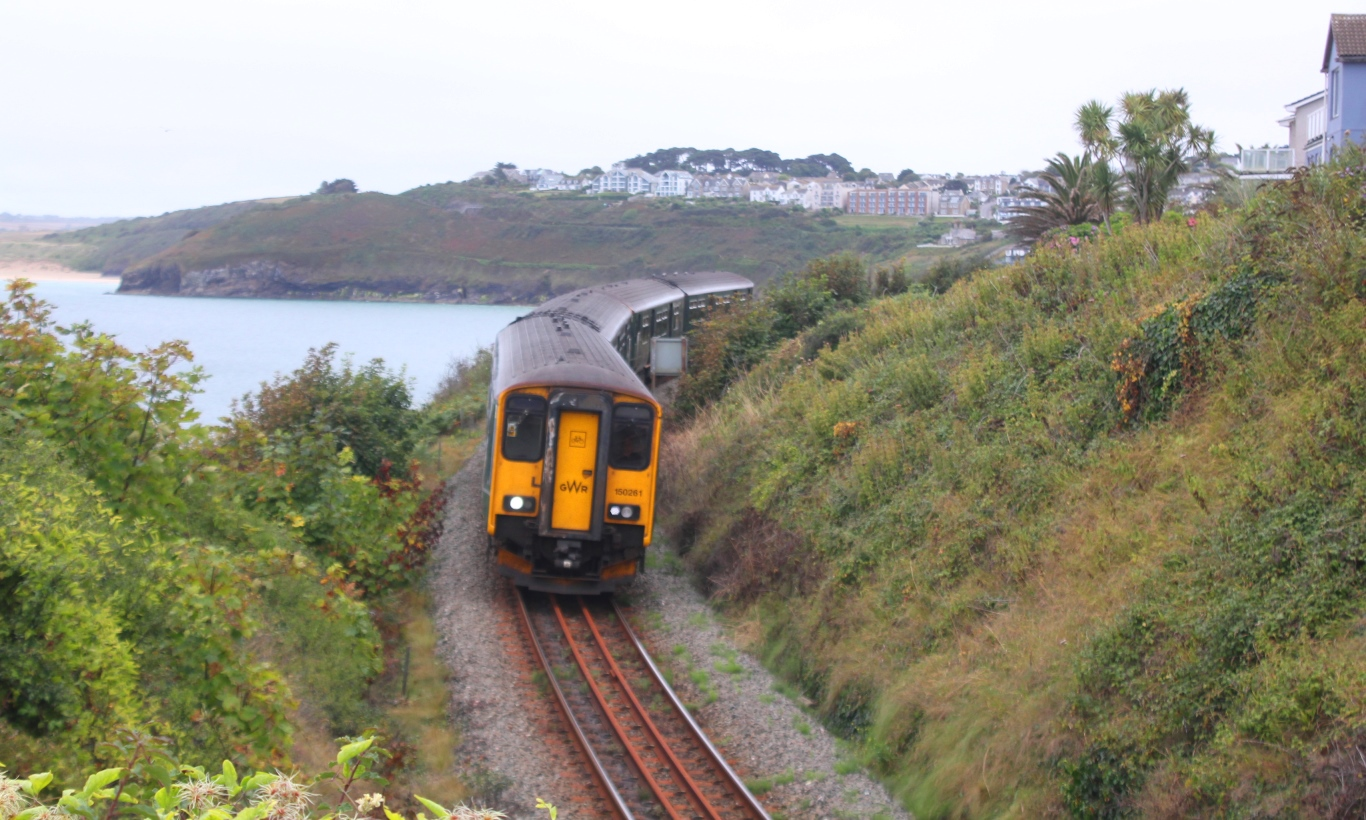
A Great Western Railway service on the St Ives Bay Line

The Cornish Main Line runs for 75¼ miles through the centre of Cornwall from Penzance to Saltash, where it continues on the Royal Albert Bridge across the River Tamar to Plymouth in Devon. It is the most westerly section of the route to Penzance from London Paddington.

As noted above, five branch lines serve Cornwall. Four have been designated as Community rail lines and are promoted by the Devon and Cornwall Rail Partnership. The fifth, to Newquay, carries local Community Rail trains but the line itself cannot be designated because of the presence of intercity and freight trains. They are:

- St Ives Bay Line – St Erth to St Ives (4¼ miles)
- Maritime Line – Truro to Falmouth (12¼ miles)
- Atlantic Coast Line (local passenger trains only) – Par to Newquay (20¾ miles)
- Looe Valley Line – Liskeard to Looe (8¾ miles)
- Tamar Valley Line – Plymouth to Gunnislake (15 miles)

See full list of stations in Railway stations in Cornwall at the bottom of the page.

=== Services ===
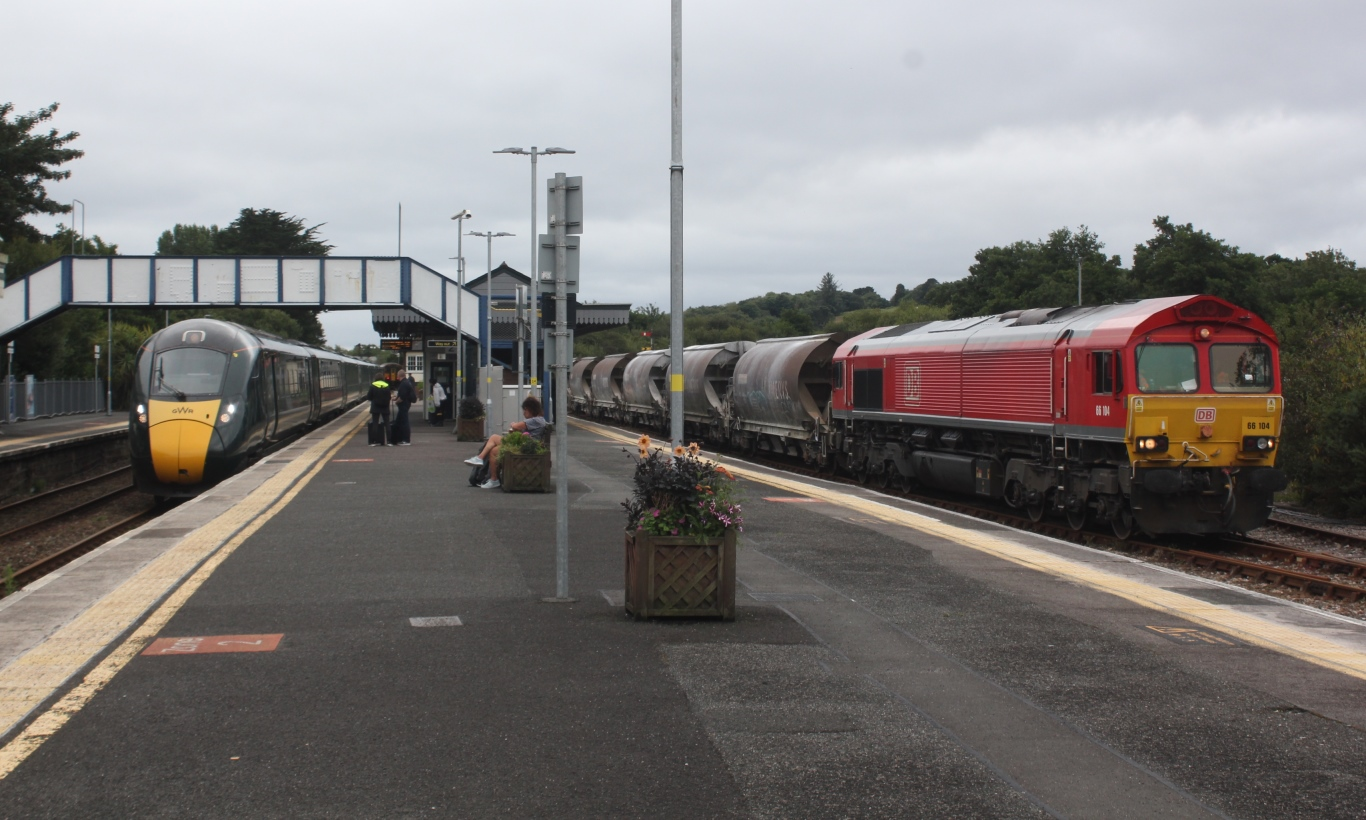
Passenger and freight trains at Par

Most services are operated by Great Western Railway including several through trains to London such as the Cornish Riviera Express that starts its journey mid-morning, and the Night Riviera sleeping car service. There are three services each day operated by CrossCountry to destinations as far afield as Aberdeen.

Typical journey times from Truro are: Redruth 13 min.; St Austell 17 min.; Falmouth 23 min.; Penzance 50 min.; St Ives 1 hr.; Plymouth 1¼ hr. Longer distance direct trains take around 2 hr. to Exeter St Davids; Bristol 3 hr. 20 min.; London Paddington 4¾ hr.; Birmingham 4 hr. 50 min.; Edinburgh 10 ¼ hr.

The Atlantic Coast Line to Newquay carries intercity services during the summer. Most of these run on Saturdays and Sundays but there is also a daily return service from London Paddington in July and August.

A number of special discounts and promotions are available to encourage travel on off-peak services, including a special "Devon and Cornwall Railcard" which offers discounts to local residents. The "Plus Bus" scheme allows through ticketing between trains and buses in many towns. Attractions and towns not on the current rail network are served by buses from stations such as Bodmin Parkway, St Austell, Redruth, St Ives and Penzance.

=== Rail freight ===
The carriage of rail freight has diminished since the 1950s. Today, the principal remaining traffic in Cornwall is china clay from the St Austell area and Goonbarrow on the Newquay line; this traffic is centred on St Blazey depot (which is on the Newquay branch, close to Par) and the freight-only line from Lostwithiel to Fowey docks where the china clay is loaded on to ships. A small amount of cement is carried to Moorswater north of Liskeard for road distribution. The docks at Falmouth are also rail connected but see no regular traffic.

== Air ==
=== Airports ===
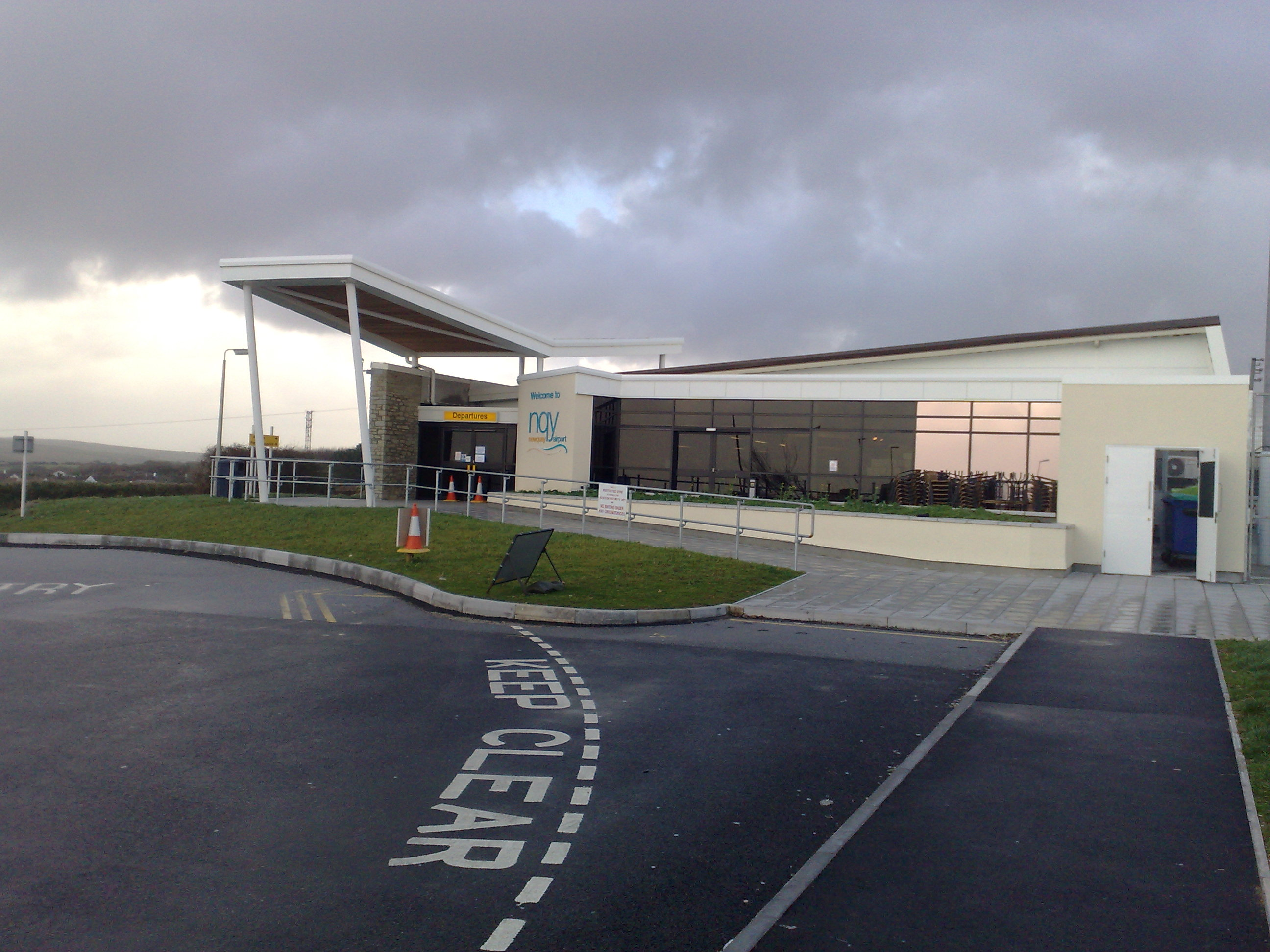
Newquay Airport

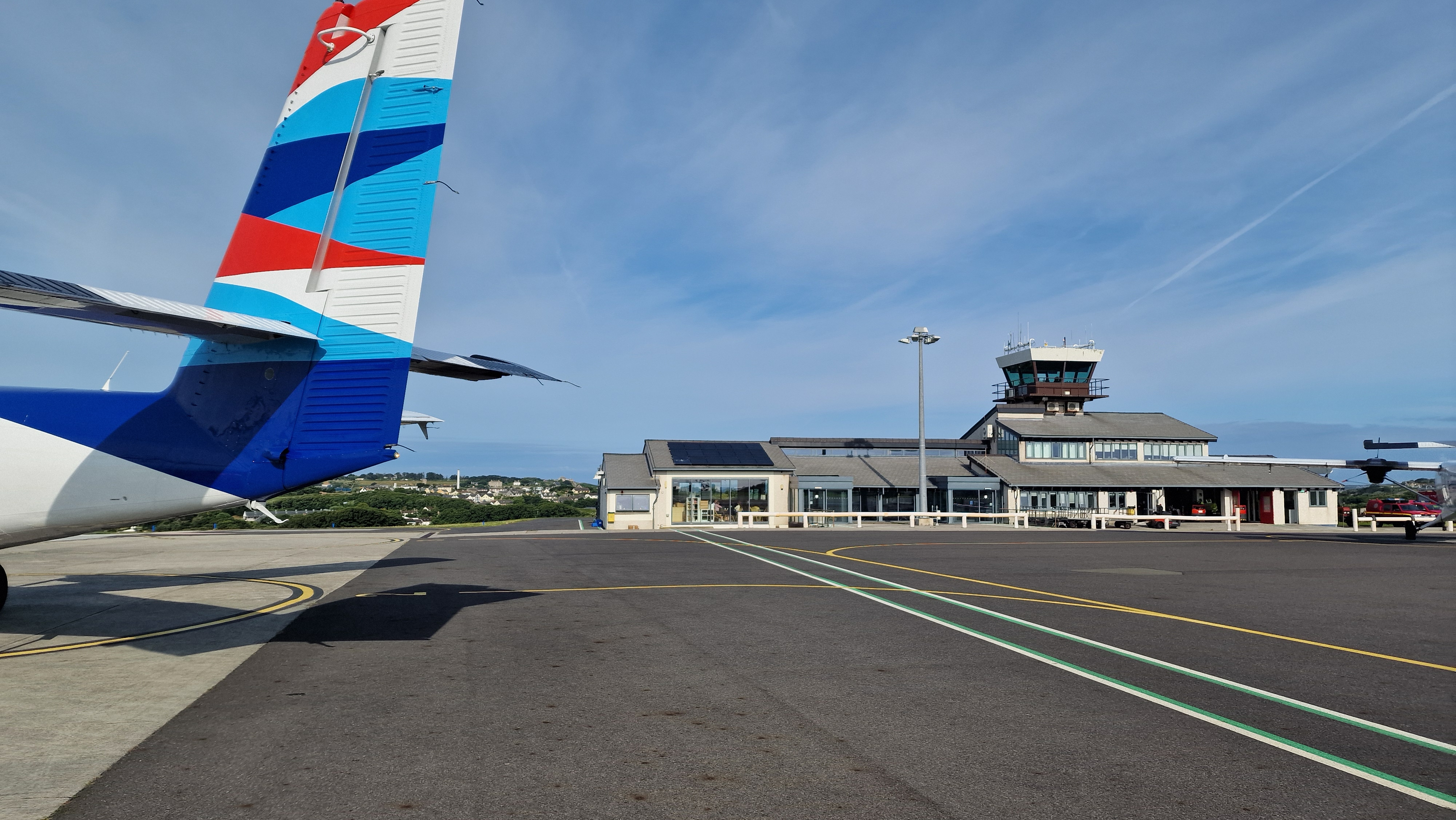
Land's End airport

Newquay Airport offers or will soon offer flights up-country to Bristol, Leeds, London (Gatwick/Stansted), Manchester, Newcastle, Glasgow, Edinburgh, Plymouth, Southampton, Cardiff and the Isle of Man, and to destinations abroad including Chambéry, Dublin, Geneva, Reus, Saint-Brieuc, Düsseldorf, Girona, Alicante, and a summer service to Zürich.

Land's End Airport (IATA: LEQ, ICAO: EGHC), situated near St Just in Penwith, 5 NM (9.3 km; 5.8 mi) west of Penzance, is the most south westerly airport of mainland Britain. It is owned by the Isles of Scilly Steamship Company (ISSC). ISSC's subsidiary Land's End Airport Limited operates the airport, and another subsidiary, Isles of Scilly Skybus, operates a regular passenger service to St Mary's in the Isles of Scilly as well as scenic flights around west Penwith.

=== Airfields ===
Airfield	Cornish Name	ICAO	Operator	Usage	Runway (ft)	Surface
Bodmin Airfield	Ayrgwel Bosvena	EGLA	Cornwall Flying Club Ltd	Private	1,575 (03/21) & 2,001 (13/31)	Grass
Perranporth Airfield	Ayrgwel Porthperan	EGTP	Perranporth Airfield Ltd	Public	3,028 (05/23), 2,431 (09/27) & 2,133 (01/19)	Asphalt
Truro Airfield	Ayrgwel Truru	EGHY	Truro Aerodrome Ltd	Private	1739 (14/32)	Grass

== River and sea transport ==
=== Major ferries ===
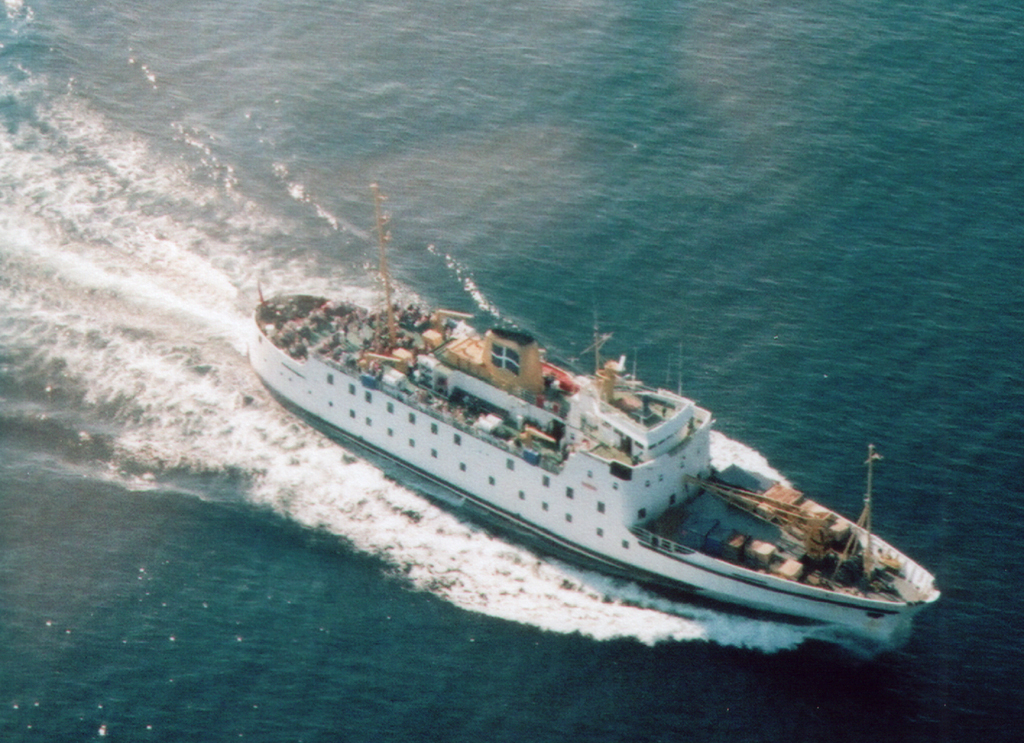
Scillonian III steaming between St Mary's, Isles of Scilly, and Penzance

The two major ferry services in Cornwall are the Torpoint Ferry which links Cornwall and Devon and the Isles of Scilly Steamship Company service linking the Isles of Scilly to the mainland.

The Torpoint Ferry is a chain ferry which carries cars and pedestrians across the Hamoaze at the mouth of the River Tamar connecting Torpoint in Cornwall with Devonport in Plymouth, Devon.

The Isles of Scilly ferry service operates seasonally (March–November) from Penzance to Isles of Scilly. The operating company is based in Penzance and also operates a year-round cargo service. The company's ferry vessel is named Scillonian III and its cargo vessel is named Gry Maritha.

=== Other ferries ===
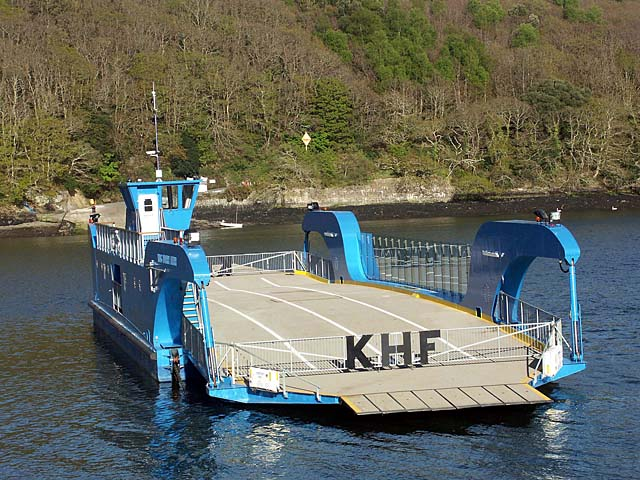
The King Harry Ferry

The King Harry Ferry is a chain ferry which carries cars and pedestrians across Carrick Roads in the estuary of the River Fal. The crossing has been voted one of the ten most scenic ferry trips in the world by The Independent, alongside the Staten Island Ferry in New York City and the Star Ferry in Hong Kong.

Further down the Fal estuary, the St Mawes Ferry connects St Mawes with Falmouth and provides a year-round service to pedestrians and cyclists.

Fal River Links is a consolidation of ferry and boat services connecting Truro and Falmouth, and stopping at a few coastal villages in between.

The Black Tor Ferry crosses the tidal River Camel between Padstow and Rock. The ferry carries pedestrians and cyclists only (not vehicles).

A number of other ferry services operate in Cornwall and full details of these are listed on the Cornwall Council website.

== See also ==
- Cornish Way
- West Country Ketch
