= POW Camp 115, Whitecross, St Columb Major =

POW Camp 115 was a prisoner of war camp during World War II in the locality of White Cross near St. Columb in Cornwall. It was built next to the railway track and covered an area of approximately 12 acres (49,000 m^{2}). The site was laid out in ranks of white concrete huts and was dominated by a tall Water tower. Around a thousand prisoners were held there. Originally these were Italians, but later most of them were moved out and it held German PoWs. One of the more notable German prisoners was Herbert Klein, the future 1952 Olympic bronze medalist and four time world record holder in the breaststroke. During the time he was held prisoner, he trained in a mud pool next to the camp. Upon seeing posters plastered all around Cornwall regarding a swimming race, he petitioned his captors to enter. They finally allowed him to do so and he won his race by a substantial margin in the 1947 Cornwall Swimming Championships held in Fowey Harbour.

The Italians built their own elaborately decorated church with an ornate altar, but the latter was later destroyed by the German PoWs. Besides the church, the inmates were allowed to level ground and construct a football pitch. The prisoners were organised into five teams and ran their own league. According to an Italian PoW, they were well treated and given the same food as the local people.

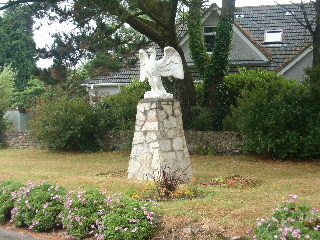
This picture shows the Italian Eagle at the site of the Camp taken 2005. (The Eagle has since been moved)

== Current use ==
Today the site has been turned into a holiday park under the name 'Piran Meadows Resort & Spa'. A few of the huts remain, though the exteriors have been plastered and pebble dashed. The water tower still stands and is used as a workshop. The church was demolished some time ago to make way for a new building. The football field, indistinguishable from the rest of the camp, provides a level pitch for caravans.

== See also ==
- List of topics related to Cornwall
- List of POW camps in Britain
