= Dalleth =

Dalleth (beginning) was a support organisation for parents and families bringing up children to speak Cornish. It was set up in 1979. It organised camps and other children's activities, mostly during Cornish Language related events. It assisted in the production of books, songs and learning materials in Cornish, including translations from other Celtic languages. It published a magazine, Len ha Lyw. It also set up playgroups.

The organisation's focus was on teaching pre-school children the language. It took advice from similar organisations in Wales and Brittany. The first play group was at Illogan. Its publications included Anethow Peder ("Peter's Adventures"). In 1981, the group was given an award at the Lowender Peran Festival for an "outstanding contribution to Celtic culture". In 1982, it was discussed at the Celtic Congress in Penzance. The Cornish Language Board supported the group. The group developed a computer programme "designed to interest children in learning the language", and exhibited a Cornish-speaking computer at the Cornish Children's Book Fair in 1985. In 1988, Dalleth was the only provider of Cornish language learning material. In 1990, Susan Smith, one of the members of the group, was made a Bard in recognition of her "services to Dalleth in the teaching of Cornish language to children". Teachers were either unpaid volunteers or existing staff who spoke Cornish.

At its peak there were perhaps a dozen families involved, but as these were spread over the whole length of Cornwall regular events such as playgroups could not be effectively organised. The organisation was weakened following the introduction of Kernewek Kemmyn, as some of its more active members opted to continue with Unified Cornish. Eventually Dalleth was merged into Kowethas an Yeth Kernewek and, as of 2001, exists under the umbrella of that organisation.
