= Rod Lyon =

Rod Lyon was born in Cornwall and trained as a civil engineer. After spending some early years at sea, he worked until retirement as a Local Government Officer. He was the Grand Bard of the Gorsedh Kernow between 2003-2006 with the bardic name of "Tewennow". His involvement in Cornish matters revolves mainly around the development of the Cornish language, which includes work on the radio and writing. He sits on the Cornish Language Board, the Cornish Esedhvos (equivalent to the Welsh Eisteddfod) and various committees within and associated with the Gorseth. Lyon could be heard at 5pm every Sunday reading the news in Cornish on BBC Radio Cornwall.

He has long been an active writer of fiction and non-fiction in and about the Cornish language. Some notable works of fiction include Dhe Emlow an Galaksi, Dicky Holla, and Tenkys, and non-fiction works include Cornish - The Struggle for Survival and Colloquial Doesn't Mean Corrupt: Observations on contemporary Revived Cornish. These works display Lyon's idiolectal Cornish.
