= Old Cornish units of measurement =

Obsolete units of measurement

The old Cornish units of measurement were used in Cornwall in the 1700s. They are based on English measurements in their names and rough sizes, but had slight differences in their values.

== Area ==
Table of Cornish Area and equivalent units
Unit	Relative to Previous	Square yard	Cornish Acre
Cornish Fathing Land	12 Knight's Fee	145200	48
Cornish Knight's Fees	4 Cornish Acres	12100	4
Cornish Acre	4 Cornish Ferlings	3025	1
Cornish Ferling	9 Cornish Rods	756.25	1/4
Cornish Rod	5 Cornish Leases	84	1/36
Cornish Lease	2 Cornish Lorghs	16.8	1/180
Cornish Lorgh	4 Cornish Sticks	8.4	1/360
Cornish Sticks		2.1	1/720

Richard Carew's Survey of Cornwall (1602) says:

Commonly thirtie Acres make a farthing land, nine farthings a Cornish Acre, and foure Cornish Acres, a Knights fee. But this rule is ouerruled to a greater or lesser quantitie, according to the fruitfulnesse, or barrennesse of the soyle.

- Cornish acre – 120 statute acres (or possibly 64), 8 score lease. Equal to 0.066 Acres.
- Cornish ferling/farthing – ¼ a Cornish acre
- Cornish lease – four sticks
- Cornish stick – four yards, three yards square
- Cornish Knight's fee – four Cornish acres
- Cornish rod – 160 lace to a Cornish acre, 36sq. rods
- Cornish lace – 18 ft square
- Cornish land rod/lorgh – half a lace, 9 ft square

== Length ==
Table of Cornish length and equivalent units
Unit	Equivalent
Cornish Fathom	5 ft
Cornish Mile	1.5 miles

== Capacity ==
Table of Cornish Capacity and equivalent units
Unit	Equivalent
Cornish Bushel	3 Winchester bushels
Cornish gallon	10 lb
Cornish apple gallon	7 lb

== Mass ==
Table of Cornish Mass and equivalent units
Unit	Equivalent
Cornish ton/mining ton	21 cwt
Cornish pound	18 ounces (butter)

== Fish ==
Table of Cornish Fish Measurements
Unit	Relative
Cornish Warp	4 Fish
Cornish Burn	21 Fish
Cornish Hundred	132 Fish
Cornish Mease	505 Herrings
Cornish Cran	800 Herrings
Cornish Long Hundred	8 times 120+5 Fish
Cornish Last	132,000 Fish
Cornish Ounce	16th part (of either a sein of fish or property)

== Sources ==
- Thornton B. Edwards, Cornish! a Dictionary of Phrases, Terms and Epithets Beginning with the word "Cornish", 2005.
