= Carrick District Council elections =

Local elections in Cornwall, England

Carrick was a non-metropolitan district in Cornwall, England, UK. It was abolished on 1 April 2009 and replaced by Cornwall Council.

== Political control ==
The first election to the council was held in 1973, initially operating as a shadow authority before coming into its powers on 1 April 1974. Political control of the council from 1973 until the council's abolition in 2009 was held by the following parties:

Party in control	Years
Independent	1973–1979
Conservative	1979–1983
No overall control	1983–1991
Liberal Democrats	1991–1995
No overall control	1995–1999
Liberal Democrats	1999–2007
No overall control	2007–2009

=== Leadership ===
The leaders of the council from 2003 until the council's abolition were:

Councillor	Party	From	To
Tony Husband	Liberal Democrats	2003	May 2006
Fred Greenslade	Liberal Democrats	May 2006	2009

== Council elections ==
- 1973 Carrick District Council election
- 1976 Carrick District Council election
- 1979 Carrick District Council election (New ward boundaries)
- 1983 Carrick District Council election
- 1987 Carrick District Council election
- 1991 Carrick District Council election
- 1995 Carrick District Council election
- 1999 Carrick District Council election
- 2003 Carrick District Council election (New ward boundaries)
- 2007 Carrick District Council election

== Results maps ==
2003 results map

2007 results map

== By-election results ==
Falmouth Trevethan By-Election 11 July 1996
Party	Candidate	Votes	%	±%
Labour		763	38.5	
Liberal Democrats		548	27.6	
Conservative		433	21.8	
UKIP		239	12.0	
Majority		215	10.9	
Turnout		1,983	44.5	
Labour hold		Swing		

St Agnes By-Election 6 March 1997
Party	Candidate	Votes	%	±%
Liberal Democrats		738	54.1	
Conservative		433	31.8	
Independent		192	14.1	
Majority		305	22.3	
Turnout		1,363	25.7	
Liberal Democrats hold		Swing		

Arwenack By-Election 17 April 1997
Party	Candidate	Votes	%	±%
Conservative		342	33.0	
Liberal Democrats		235	22.7	
Labour		235	22.7	
Independent		224	21.6	
Majority		107	10.3	
Turnout		1,036	37.5	
Conservative hold		Swing		

Mylor By-Election 24 July 1997
Party	Candidate	Votes	%	±%
Conservative		797	58.2	+23.8
Liberal Democrats		334	24.4	+1.5
Labour		238	17.4	−0.4
Majority		463	33.8	
Turnout		1,369	30.3	
Conservative hold		Swing		

Trevethan By-Election 30 October 1997
Party	Candidate	Votes	%	±%
Labour		453	40.7	+4.4
Conservative		346	31.1	+31.1
Liberal Democrats		159	14.3	−31.0
Independent		155	13.9	−4.5
Majority		107	9.6	
Turnout		1,113		
Labour hold		Swing		

Trehaverne By-Election 20 November 1997
Party	Candidate	Votes	%	±%
Conservative		600	46.9	+23.2
Liberal Democrats		443	34.6	−15.3
Labour		236	18.5	−8.0
Majority		157	12.3	
Turnout		1,279		
Conservative gain from Liberal Democrats		Swing		

Kenwyn By-Election 8 June 2000
Party	Candidate	Votes	%	±%
Liberal Democrats		593	53.6	+15.1
Conservative		408	36.9	−9.2
Mebyon Kernow		105	9.5	+9.5
Majority		185	16.7	
Turnout		1,106	31.0	
Liberal Democrats hold		Swing		

Perranzabuloe By-Election 3 August 2000
Party	Candidate	Votes	%	±%
Liberal Democrats		665	63.8	+29.6
Conservative		337	36.2	+15.2
Majority		288	27.6	
Turnout		1,002	25.1	
Liberal Democrats gain from Independent		Swing		

Arwenack By-Election 15 February 2001
Party	Candidate	Votes	%	±%
Conservative		439	41.1	+0.7
Liberal Democrats		313	29.3	+0.4
Labour		199	18.6	+18.6
Independent		103	9.6	−21.1
Independent Pensioner		14	1.3	+1.3
Majority		126	11.8	
Turnout		1,068	40.1	
Conservative hold		Swing		

Moresk By-Election 2 May 2002
Party	Candidate	Votes	%	±%
Liberal Democrats	Phillip Sell	538	52.7	+16.0
Conservative	Robert Penhaligon	251	24.6	+11.8
Mebyon Kernow	Barry Andrew	118	11.6	+11.6
Labour	Charlotte MacKenzie	114	11.2	+11.2
Majority		287	28.1	
Turnout		1,021	39.2	
Liberal Democrats hold		Swing		

Mylor By-Election 22 August 2002 (2)
Party	Candidate	Votes	%	±%
Conservative		700		
Independent		632		
Liberal Democrats		579		
Conservative		573		
Liberal Democrats		533		
Independent		462		
Turnout		3,479	40.9	
Conservative hold		Swing		
Independent gain from Conservative		Swing		

Arwenack By-Election 16 December 2004
Party	Candidate	Votes	%	±%
Liberal Democrats	Maureen Davies	502	45.5	+10.4
Conservative		306	27.7	−13.3
Independent		296	26.8	+14.7
Majority		196	17.8	
Turnout		1,104	24.3	
Liberal Democrats gain from Conservative		Swing		

Falmouth Trescobeas By-Election 21 July 2005
Party	Candidate	Votes	%	±%
Liberal Democrats	Marcia Wendgrat	351	47.8	−9.4
Labour	Edward Scott	282	38.4	−4.4
Conservative	Nigel Rimmer	101	13.8	+13.8
Majority		69	9.4	
Turnout		734	26.0	
Liberal Democrats hold		Swing		

Moresk By-Election 27 October 2005
Party	Candidate	Votes	%	±%
Liberal Democrats	Maurice Vella	316	44.4	+5.2
Conservative		273	38.3	+38.3
Mebyon Kernow		73	10.3	
Labour		50	7.0	
Majority		43	6.1	
Turnout		712	26.9	
Liberal Democrats hold		Swing		

Kenwyn & Chacewater By-Election 15 December 2005
Party	Candidate	Votes	%	±%
Conservative	Miriam Richardson	530	71.0	+25.2
Liberal Democrats	Lyndon Richards	216	29.0	−4.6
Majority		314	42.0	
Turnout		746	17.5	
Conservative gain from Liberal Democrats		Swing		
