= Kerrier District Council elections =

Local government elections in Cornwall, England

Kerrier was a non-metropolitan district in Cornwall, England. It was abolished on 1 April 2009 and replaced by Cornwall Council.

== Political control ==
The first election to the council was held in 1973, the council initially operating as a shadow authority before coming into its powers on 1 April 1974. Political control of the council from 1973 until its abolition in 2009 was held by the following parties:

Party in control	Years
Independent	1973–1979
No overall control	1979–2009

=== Leadership ===
The leaders of the council from 2007 until the council's abolition were:

Councillor	Party	From	To
Rex Sadler	Independent		2007
Graeme Hicks	Independent	2007	2009

== Council elections ==
- 1973 Kerrier District Council election
- 1976 Kerrier District Council election
- 1979 Kerrier District Council election (New ward boundaries)
- 1983 Kerrier District Council election
- 1987 Kerrier District Council election
- 1991 Kerrier District Council election
- 1995 Kerrier District Council election
- 1999 Kerrier District Council election
- 2003 Kerrier District Council election (New ward boundaries)
- 2007 Kerrier District Council election

== Results maps ==
2003 results map

2007 results map

== By-election results ==
Illogan South By-Election 12 December 1996
Party	Candidate	Votes	%	±%
Labour		629	56.8	
Independent		236	21.3	
Liberal Democrats		155	14.0	
Liberal		88	7.9	
Majority		393	35.5	
Turnout		1,108	21.3	
Labour gain from Liberal Democrats		Swing		

Helston North By-Election 5 March 1998
Party	Candidate	Votes	%	±%
Conservative		369	42.9	+25.1
Independent		222	25.8	−14.0
Liberal Democrats		111	12.9	−29.5
Independent		96	11.2	+11.2
Labour		62	7.2	+7.2
Majority		147	17.1	
Turnout		860	22.2	
Conservative gain from Independent		Swing		

St Day & Lanner By-Election 13 April 2000
Party	Candidate	Votes	%	±%
Independent		485	41.3	+41.3
Conservative		269	22.9	+22.9
Labour		217	18.5	−17.2
Liberal Democrats		204	17.4	−46.9
Majority		216	18.4	
Turnout		1,175	27.6	
Independent gain from Liberal Democrats		Swing		

Porthleven By-Election 4 April 2002
Party	Candidate	Votes	%	±%
Independent		585	54.8	−1.3
Independent		217	20.3	−6.7
Liberal Democrats		187	17.5	+0.6
Conservative		48	4.5	+4.5
Labour		30	2.8	+2.8
Majority		368	34.5	
Turnout		1,067	41.7	
Independent hold		Swing		

Porthleven and Sithney By-Election 29 April 2004
Party	Candidate	Votes	%	±%
Independent	John Strike	544	87.2	+14.4
Liberal Democrats	Rosemary Gunter	70	11.2	−16.0
Independent	Andrew Menzies-Grant	10	1.6	+1.6
Majority		474	76.0	
Turnout		624	22.0	
Independent hold		Swing		

Porthleven and Sithney By-Election 18 November 2004
Party	Candidate	Votes	%	±%
Mebyon Kernow	Jane Acton	177	33.1	+33.1
Independent	William Rowe	107	20.0	−68.7
Liberal Democrats	Rosemary Gunter	102	19.1	+7.9
Conservative	Alfred Mesropians	92	17.2	+17.2
UKIP	Andrew Menzies-Grant	56	10.5	+10.5
Majority		70	13.1	
Turnout		534	18.8	
Mebyon Kernow gain from Independent		Swing		

Redruth South By-Election 16 March 2006
Party	Candidate	Votes	%	±%
Independent	David Pascoe	443	45.6	−1.8
Liberal Democrats	William Turner	206	21.2	+3.2
Independent	Barbara Ellenbroek	138	14.2	+14.2
Labour	Linda Moore	104	10.7	−2.7
Conservative	Ian Bosworth	80	8.2	−5.9
Majority		237	24.4	
Turnout		971	20.8	
Independent hold		Swing		

Helston North By-Election 29 November 2007
Party	Candidate	Votes	%	±%
Conservative	Linda Taylor	315	37.1	
Independent	Tanya Dyer	226	26.6	
Independent	Dave Swift	194	22.8	
Mebyon Kernow	Alan Sanders	115	13.5	
Majority		89	10.5	
Turnout		850	17.8	
Conservative gain from Independent		Swing		
