= Scillonian =

Scillonian may refer to:

- An adjective for people or things related to the Isles of Scilly, off the Cornish peninsula of Great Britain
- Scillonian entrance grave, megalithic chamber tombs in the British Isles
- Scillonian (magazine), a quarterly magazine first published in 1925

== Ships ==
- Scillonian (1925), a passenger ferry in service from 1926 to 1956
- Scillonian (1955), a passenger ferry in service from 1956 to 1977
- RMV Scillonian III, a passenger ferry in service since 1977
