= Parnall's Canal =

Former canal in Cornwall, England

Coordinates: 50.338°N 4.791°W

Parnall's Canal was a half mile long canal that was built in Cornwall in about 1720 near St Austell. It was closed due to a rock slide in about 1732. It was one of only six canals to be built in Cornwall, the others being the St. Columb Canal from Mawgan Porth to St. Columb, the Liskeard & Looe Union Canal, the Par Canal from Pontsmill to Par, the Hayle Canal and the Bude Canal.

== See also ==
- Canals of Great Britain
- History of the British canal system
