= 2007 Penwith District Council election =

2007 UK local government election

Results of the 2007 Penwith District Council election

Elections to Penwith District Council were held on 3 May 2007. One third of the council was up for election and the council stayed under no overall control.

After the election, the composition of the council was:

- Conservative 17
- Liberal Democrat 12
- Independent 5
- Labour 1

== Results ==
Penwith local election result 2007
Party	Seats	Gains	Losses	Net gain/loss	Seats %	Votes %	Votes	+/−
Conservative	8	3	0	+3	66.7	37.9	4,787	+3.4
Liberal Democrats	3	2	2	0	25.0	32.5	4,101	-7.5
Independent	1	0	3	-3	8.3	12.5	1,578	+7.5
Green	0	0	0	0	0.0	7.7	973	+4.7
Labour	0	0	0	0	0.0	5.5	699	-5.0
UKIP	0	0	0	0	0.0	2.4	299	-0.7
Mebyon Kernow	0	0	0	0	0.0	1.6	196	-2.3

1 Conservative candidate was unopposed.

=== By ward ===
Goldsithney
Party	Candidate	Votes	%	±%
Conservative	Sue Nicholas	405	55.8	+7.5
Liberal Democrats	Nigel Walker	321	44.2	−7.5
Majority		84	11.6	
Turnout		726	47.3	−1.7
Conservative gain from Liberal Democrats		Swing		

Hayle North
Party	Candidate	Votes	%	±%
Liberal Democrats	Robb Lello	703	67.4	
Independent	Owen Philp	340	32.6	
Majority		363	34.8	
Turnout		1,043	35.5	−5.3
Liberal Democrats gain from Independent		Swing		

Lelant & Carbis Bay
Party	Candidate	Votes	%	±%
Conservative	Elizabeth Penhaligon	701	55.8	+3.2
Liberal Democrats	Richard Ryan	324	25.8	+1.8
Green	Paula Richards	232	18.5	+2.8
Majority		377	30.0	+1.4
Turnout		1,257	42.1	−1.2
Conservative hold		Swing		

Madron & Zennor
Party	Candidate	Votes	%	±%
Independent	Roy Mann	440	83.8	+4.7
UKIP	James Wallis	85	16.2	+16.2
Majority		355	67.6	+9.4
Turnout		525	38.6	−8.6
Independent hold		Swing		

Marazion & Perranuthnoe
Party	Candidate	Votes	%	±%
Conservative	Sidney Thomas	443	56.6	−11.0
Liberal Democrats	Gill Barnes	339	43.4	+43.4
Majority		104	13.2	−34.4
Turnout		782	55.0	−3.3
Conservative hold		Swing		

Morvah, Pendeen & St Just
Party	Candidate	Votes	%	±%
Conservative	Howard Eddy	740	44.8	−0.9
Liberal Democrats	Sue James	565	34.2	−12.6
UKIP	Rose Smith	214	13.0	+13.0
Labour	Adrian Marsham	131	7.9	+0.4
Majority		175	10.6	
Turnout		1,650	43.9	+4.7
Conservative gain from Liberal Democrats		Swing		

Penzance East
Party	Candidate	Votes	%	±%
Liberal Democrats	Ruth Lewarne	498	31.8	−20.4
Independent	Nigel Waller	347	22.2	+22.2
Labour	Cornelius Olivier	271	17.3	+4.6
Mebyon Kernow	Phillip Rendle	196	12.5	+12.5
Green	Rob Pickering	173	11.1	+11.1
Independent	Malcolm Lawrence	79	5.1	+5.1
Majority		151	9.6	−24.6
Turnout		1,564	35.0	+1.9
Liberal Democrats gain from Independent		Swing		

Penzance South
Party	Candidate	Votes	%	±%
Conservative	Roger Harding	1,095	60.0	+20.6
Liberal Democrats	Heidi Worth	552	30.3	+4.5
Labour	Sara Olivier	177	9.7	+0.5
Majority		543	29.7	+14.1
Turnout		1,824	46.4	+1.0
Conservative hold		Swing		

St Buryan
Party	Candidate	Votes	%	±%
Conservative	William Maddern	unopposed		
Conservative hold		Swing		

St Erth & St Hilary
Party	Candidate	Votes	%	±%
Conservative	Doe Harry	413	52.6	+52.6
Independent	Sheila Furneaux	372	47.4	−21.6
Majority		41	5.2	
Turnout		785	44.8	−0.4
Conservative gain from Independent		Swing		

St Ives North
Party	Candidate	Votes	%	±%
Liberal Democrats	Andrew Mitchell	592	46.5	−3.0
Conservative	Colin Nicholls	430	33.8	+15.7
Green	Louise Channon	251	19.7	+1.5
Majority		162	12.7	−18.6
Turnout		1,273	40.4	+2.2
Liberal Democrats hold		Swing		

St Ives South
Party	Candidate	Votes	%	±%
Conservative	Joan Symons	560	46.5	
Green	Ron Tulley	317	26.3	
Liberal Democrats	Bill Fry	207	17.2	
Labour	Terence Murray	120	10.0	
Majority		243	20.2	
Turnout		1,204	42.4	−2.2
Conservative hold		Swing		
