= Demographics of Cornwall =

Demographics of England

Cornwall is a unitary authority and ceremonial county of England in the United Kingdom. At the 2011 census it had a population of 532,000. Cornwall is the homeland of the Cornish people, and many within Cornwall identify with a Cornish ethnic or national identity, although, due to Cornwall's political status as part of England and the United Kingdom, as well as in-migration from other parts of the UK and EU, additional identities such as English, British, and European may also be adopted.

== Ethnicity ==
In the 2021 census, the following results were given for ethnic identity.

- White (Cornish/English/Welsh/Scottish/Northern Irish/British): 93.6%
- White (Irish): 0.4%
- White (Gypsy or Irish Traveller): 0.1%
- White (Roma): 0.1%
- White (Other White): 2.6%
- Mixed (White and Black Caribbean): 0.3%
- Mixed (White and Black African): 0.2%
- Mixed (White and Asian): 0.4%
- Mixed (Other Mixed): 0.3%
- Asian/Asian British (Indian): 0.1%
- Asian/Asian British (Pakistani): 0.0%
- Asian/Asian British (Bangladeshi): 0.1%
- Asian/Asian British (Chinese): 0.2%
- Asian/Asian British (Other Asian): 0.3%
- Black/African/Caribbean/Black British (African): 0.1%
- Black/African/Caribbean/Black British (Caribbean): 0.1%
- Black/African/Caribbean/Black British (Other Black): 0.0%
- Other (Arab): 0.1%
- Other (Other): 1.0%

== National identity ==
In the 2011 census, the following results were given for national identity. "Cornish" was not provided as a tickbox on the census form, which it has been argued results in an undercount of Cornish national identity, although it was allocated a separate category in the results.

The percentage of respondents who gave "Cornish" as an answer to the National Identity question in the 2011 census.

- All categories: 532,273
- Cornish only identity: 52,793
- Cornish and British only identity: 5,185
- Cornish and at least one of English/Welsh/Scottish/Northern Irish identities (with or without British): 15,242
- No Cornish identity: 459,053
- English only identity: 315,525
- English and British only identity: 37,086
- Other English combined background identity: 16,970
- No English identity: 162,692
- Welsh only identity: 4,401
- Welsh and British only identity: 624
- Other Welsh combined background identity: 545
- No Welsh identity: 526,703
- Scottish only identity: 3,697
- Scottish and British only identity: 569
- Other Scottish combined background identity: 392
- No Scottish identity: 527,615
- Northern Irish only identity: 788
- Northern Irish and British only identity: 0
- Other Northern Irish combined background identity: 0
- No Northern Irish identity: 531,239
- British only identity: 81,361
- British and any other identity: 48,923
- No British identity: 401,719
- Irish only identity: 1,248
- Irish and British only identity: 57
- Irish and Northern Irish only identity: 10
- Irish, Northern Irish and British only identity: 7
- Irish and at least one of English/Welsh/Scottish identities (with or without British): 139
- Irish, Northern Irish and at least one of English/Welsh/Scottish identities (with or without British): 139
- No Irish identity: 530,811
- Other identities only: 64,822
- Other identities and at least one of English/Welsh/Scottish/Northern Irish/British only: 22,134
- At least one of English/Welsh/Scottish/Northern Irish/British identities only: 445,317

=== Cornish identity ===
Overall, most people in Cornwall identify as having no Cornish identity.

- Some form of Cornish identity: 13.8%
  - Cornish only identity: 9.9%
  - Cornish and British only identity: 1.0%
  - Cornish and English/Welsh/Scottish/Northern Irish identities: 2.9%
- No Cornish identity: 86.2%

== Country of birth ==
In the 2011 census, the following results were given for country of birth:

- United Kingdom: 95.6%
  - England: 92.7%
  - Wales: 1.4%
  - Scotland: 1.2%
  - Northern Ireland: 0.3%
  - United Kingdom not otherwise specified: 0.0%
- Ireland: 0.3%
- Other EU countries: 1.8%
  - EU member states in March 2001: 1.0%
  - EU accession states April 2001 to March 2011: 0.8%
- Other: 2.4%

== Household language ==
In the 2011 census, the following results were given for household languages other than English:

- At least one person in the household have English as their main language: 2360
- No people in household have English as their main language: 2155

Overall, 98% of people in Cornwall aged 16 or over have English as their main language.

== Religion ==
Cornwall has the 4th-highest proportion of people who say they are pagan in England and Wales.

In the 2021 census, the following results were given for religion:

- No religion: 46.3%
- Christian: 45.4%
- Religion not stated: 6.7%
- Other religion: 0.8%
- Buddhist: 0.4%
- Muslim: 0.2%
- Hindu: 0.1%
- Jewish: 0.1%
- Sikh: <0.1%

Among those with 'Other religion', the following results were given:

- Pagan/Wicca/Heathen/Druid: 49.1%
- Other: 25.5%
- Spiritualist/Spiritual: 21.5%
- Mixed Religion: 2.5%
- Satanism: 1.4%

Results combined into 'other' include Humanist, Spiritual, Wicca, Taoist, Druid, Rastafarian, Pantheneismm Baha’i, own belief system, believe in God, Satanism, Witchcraft, Heathen, Animism, Shamanism, Scientology, Universalist, Deist, Theism, New Age, Shinto, Zoroastrian, Occult, Eckankar, Mysticism, Traditional African Religion, Ravidassia, Church of all religion, reconstructionist, Thelemite, Vodun, Confucianist, Jain, Native American Church, Unification Church, Brhama Kumari, Chinese Religion and Druze.

=== Religion change 2001-2011 ===
At the 2011 census, the results for the following religions changed:

- Hindu: 133% change (actual change +317 responses)
- No religion: 94% change (actual change +78060 responses)
- Buddhist: 84% change (actual change +788 responses)
- Other religion: 56% change (actual change +1295 responses)
- Muslim: 27% change (actual change +183 responses)
- Religion not stated: 13% change (actual change +5228 responses)
- Sikh: 1% change (actual change +1 response)
- Jewish: -11% change (actual change -46 responses)
- Christian: -14% change (actual change -52666 responses)

== Health ==
In the 2011 census, the following results were given for personal health and wellbeing:

=== General health ===
Most people in Cornwall identify their health as 'good' but the proportion of those in good health is slightly lower than the national average (at 81.2%). The proportion of those identifying their health as 'bad' was similar to those over the whole of the England and Wales (5.6%).

- In good health: 78.8% (an increase of 12.6% since 2001)
- In bad health: 6.3% (a decrease of 3.6% since 2001)

=== Limitation of day-to-day activities ===
- Limits day-to-day activities 'a lot': 10.0%
- Limits day-to-day activities 'a little': 11.4%
- Day-to-day activities 'not limited': 78.6%

=== Carers ===
- Undertakes unpaid care every week: 11.9% (an increase of 0.6% since 2001)
  - Provides 1–19 hours of unpaid care per week: 7.3%
  - Provides 20–49 hours of unpaid care per week: 1.6%
  - Provides more than 50 hours of unpaid care per week: 3.0%

== Marital status ==
At the 2011 census, 50% of Cornwall's population were married.

The following results were given for marital status:

- Married: 222,141
- Single (never married or registered in a same-sex civil partnership): 125,475
- Divorced or formerly in a same-sex civil partnership which is now legally dissolved: 47,858
- Widowed or surviving partner from a same-sex civil partnership: 36,376
- Separated (but still legally married or in a same-sex civil partnership): 9582
- In a registered same-sex civil partnership: 900

== Household composition ==
In the 2011 census, the following results were given for questions relating to household composition:

=== Rooms and bedrooms ===
The average household size is 2.3 people per household which is in line with the England and Wales average.

The average number of rooms per household (including kitchens, living areas, bedrooms, utility rooms, studies and conservatories) is 5.6. The average number of bedrooms per household is 2.8.

Cornwall's proportion of overcrowded households (where there are fewer rooms than inhabitants) has increased from 5.0% at the 2001 census to 5.8% at the 2011 census. It is, however, much lower than the England and Wales average (at 8.5%).

=== Central heating ===
A household is classified as having central heating if it is present in some or all rooms, whether used or not.

7% of Cornwall's households are without central heating, which is significantly down from 18% of households in 2001 but much higher than the average over England and Wales of 2.7%. Cornwall has the 4th highest percentage of households without central heating in England and Wales.

=== Cars and vans ===
Cars and vans counted are any that are owned or available for use by one or more members of a household. This can include company cars or vans that are available for private use but not any cars or vans belonging to visitors. It does not include motorbikes or scooters.

At the 2011 census, there were 310,474 cars and vans in Cornwall equating to a car or van for every 1.7 people in Cornwall.

In Cornwall, 17.3% of households did not have access to a car or van. This was a decrease from the 2001 census where 20.0% of households in Cornwall were without access to a car or van.

=== Travel to work ===
The following results were given for questions on travelling to work:

- Driving a car or van: 64% (an increase of 6.0% from the 2001 census)
- On foot: 14% (an increase of 1.1%)
- Work mainly at or from home: 9% (a decrease of 5.2%)
- As a passenger in a car or van: 5% (a decrease of 1.4%)
- By bus, minibus or coach: 2% (a decrease of 0.3%)
- By bicycle: 2% (a decrease of 0.1%)
- By motorcycle, scooter or moped: 1% (a decrease of 0.4%)
- By train: 1% (an increase of 0.4%)
- By another method of travel: 1% (no change)
- By taxi: 0% (a decrease of 0.1%)
- By underground, metro, light rail or tram: 0% (no change)

== Qualifications ==
In the 2011 census, the following results were given for questions relating to qualifications:

=== Level 4 Qualifications and above ===
In 2011, 110,518 people in Cornwall (25% of the population) aged 16–74 were qualified to NVQ4 level or above. This was slightly below the averages for the South West (27.4%) and England and Wales (27.2%) but was a notable increase from the 2001 census where 15.8% of the population had NVQ4 or higher.

=== Level 2 Qualifications ===
17.4% of Cornwall's population aged 16–74 (76,782 people) were only qualified to NVQ2. This is slightly higher than the averages for the South West (16.4%) and for England and Wales (15.3%) although the proportion of people with only NVQ2 level qualifications has decreased from the 2001 census figure of 22.1%.

=== No qualifications ===
22.4% of Cornwall's population aged 16–74 (99,237 people) have no academic or professional qualifications. This is higher than the South West average (20.7%) but lower than the average for England and Wales (22.7%). The proportion of people in Cornwall without qualifications has decreased from the 2001 census figure of 29.0%.
