= Caradon District Council elections =

Local government elections in Cornwall, England

Caradon was a non-metropolitan district in Cornwall, England, UK. It was abolished on 1 April 2009 and replaced by Cornwall Council.

== Political control ==
The first election to the council was held in 1973, initially operating as a shadow authority before coming into its powers on 1 April 1974. Political control of the council from 1973 until the council's abolition in 2009 was held by the following parties:

Party in control	Years
Independent	1973–1995
No overall control	1995–2003
Independent	2003–2004
No overall control	2004–2007
Liberal Democrats	2007–2009

=== Leadership ===
The leaders of the council from 2007 until the council's abolition were:

Councillor	Party	From	To
Tony Powell	Liberal Democrats	May 2007	Sep 2007
John Turner	Liberal Democrats	2007	2009

== Council elections ==
- 1973 Caradon District Council election
- 1976 Caradon District Council election
- 1979 Caradon District Council election
- 1983 Caradon District Council election (New ward boundaries)
- 1987 Caradon District Council election
- 1991 Caradon District Council election
- 1995 Caradon District Council election
- 1999 Caradon District Council election
- 2003 Caradon District Council election (New ward boundaries)
- 2007 Caradon District Council election

== Results maps ==
2003 results map

2007 results map

== By-election results ==
Essa By-Election 1 October 1998
Party	Candidate	Votes	%	±%
Liberal Democrats		534	54.9	+15.0
Labour		203	25.6	−12.1
Independent		156	19.6	+19.6
Majority		232	29.3	
Turnout		893	25.0	
Liberal Democrats hold		Swing		

Lansallos By-Election 18 May 2000
Party	Candidate	Votes	%	±%
Liberal Democrats		268	49.3	+10.5
Conservative		143	26.3	+26.3
Independent		133	24.4	−36.8
Majority		125	23.0	
Turnout		544	41.0	
Liberal Democrats gain from Independent		Swing		

Lanteglos By-Election 6 September 2001
Party	Candidate	Votes	%	±%
Conservative		unopposed		
Conservative gain from Independent		Swing		

Liskeard South By-Election 22 November 2001
Party	Candidate	Votes	%	±%
Liberal Democrats		473	48.3	+22.8
Conservative		391	39.9	+5.3
Mebyon Kernow		115	11.7	−0.9
Majority		82	8.4	
Turnout		979	29.9	
Liberal Democrats gain from Conservative		Swing		

Calstock and Harrowbarrow By-Election 10 October 2002
Party	Candidate	Votes	%	±%
Independent		181	33.6	−22.1
Conservative		176	32.7	+32.7
Independent		120	22.3	−13.2
Independent		61	11.3	+2.6
Majority		5	0.9	
Turnout		538	28.4	
Independent hold		Swing		

Menheniot By-Election 17 October 2002
Party	Candidate	Votes	%	±%
Conservative		269	54.1	+54.1
Independent		177	35.6	−10.2
UKIP		51	10.3	+10.3
Majority		92	18.5	
Turnout		497	33.4	
Conservative gain from Liberal Democrats		Swing		

Liskeard North By-Election 10 June 2004
Party	Candidate	Votes	%	±%
Liberal Democrats	Jennifer Kettles	889	64.8	+11.5
Conservative		483	35.2	+11.8
Majority		406	29.6	
Turnout		1,372	39.8	
Liberal Democrats hold		Swing		

Deviock and Sheviock By-Election 30 September 2004
Party	Candidate	Votes	%	±%
Liberal Democrats	James Candy	329	40.8	+40.8
Independent		299	37.1	−16.4
Conservative		178	22.1	+22.1
Majority		30	3.7	
Turnout		806	47.8	
Liberal Democrats gain from Independent		Swing		

Saltash-Pill By-Election 25 May 2006
Party	Candidate	Votes	%	±%
Liberal Democrats	Graham Syass	474	43.6	+15.8
Independent	Brian Pedley	334	30.7	−23.5
Conservative	Lee Jones	280	25.7	+7.7
Majority		140	12.9	
Turnout		1,088	32.0	
Liberal Democrats gain from Independent		Swing		

St Cleer and St Neot By-Election 10 August 2006
Party	Candidate	Votes	%	±%
Liberal Democrats	Robert Emuss	519	58.8	+23.3
Conservative	Graham Cooke	363	41.2	+16.0
Majority		156	17.6	
Turnout		882	24.6	
Liberal Democrats hold		Swing		
