= Fowey Gallants =

The Fowey Gallants or the Gallants of Fowey, was group of privateers and pirates who operated out of the port of Fowey, in Cornwall, during the Hundred Years' War in the 14th and 15th centuries.

The port was given licences to attack and seize French vessels in the English Channel, following the assistance the port had given during the Siege of Calais and the Battle of Agincourt. Many foreign vessels and some English vessels were seized and these activities became very profitable for the corrupt port. Notable privateers included Mark Mixtow, who was a licensed privateer with a flotilla of three ships, the Dutch pirate Hankyn Seelander was given a privateers licence by The Crown in 1442 and tasked with patrolling the coast. Others involved in piracy included John Trevelyn, Thomas Tregarthen, Nicholas Carminow and Sir Hugh Courtenay owner of the Boconnoc estate. John Wilcock's ship Barbara, seized fifteen ships in two weeks in 1469.

Following peace with France, the piracy continued. Edward IV asked the “willing men from Dartmouth” to stop the piracy. A meeting was arranged in Lostwithiel and while the Gallants were there, their ships were seized and the harbour chain removed. Several pirates were hanged.
