= North Cornwall District Council elections =

Local government elections in Cornwall, England

North Cornwall was a non-metropolitan district in Cornwall, England. It was abolished on 1 April 2009 and replaced by Cornwall Council.

== Political control ==
The first election to the council was held in 1973, initially operating as a shadow authority before coming into its powers on 1 April 1974. Political control of the council from 1973 until the council's abolition in 2009 was held by the following parties:

Party in control	Years
Independent	1973–2006
No overall control	2006–2009

== Council elections ==
- 1973 North Cornwall District Council election
- 1976 North Cornwall District Council election
- 1979 North Cornwall District Council election (New ward boundaries & district boundary changes also took place)
- 1983 North Cornwall District Council election
- 1987 North Cornwall District Council election
- 1991 North Cornwall District Council election
- 1995 North Cornwall District Council election
- 1999 North Cornwall District Council election
- 2003 North Cornwall District Council election (New ward boundaries)
- 2007 North Cornwall District Council election

== Results maps ==
2003 results map

2007 results map

== By-election results ==
Launceston North By-Election 12 September 1996
Party	Candidate	Votes	%	±%
Liberal Democrats		512	70.8	
Independent		212	29.3	
Majority		300	41.5	
Turnout		724	23.6	
Liberal Democrats hold		Swing		

Ottery By-Election 11 December 1997
Party	Candidate	Votes	%	±%
Independent		207	53.1	
Liberal Democrats		183	46.9	
Majority		24	6.2	
Turnout		390		
Independent gain from Liberal Democrats		Swing		

Trigg By-Election 29 October 1998
Party	Candidate	Votes	%	±%
Liberal Democrats		270	63.2	
Conservative		157	36.8	
Majority		113	26.4	
Turnout		427	33.3	
Liberal Democrats gain from Independent		Swing		

St Minver By-Election 9 September 1999
Party	Candidate	Votes	%	±%
Independent		372	55.3	
Independent		279	41.5	
Independent		22	3.3	
Majority		93	13.8	
Turnout		673		
Independent hold		Swing		

Rumford By-Election 1 March 2001
Party	Candidate	Votes	%	±%
Liberal Democrats		355	56.7	+13.7
Conservative		271	43.3	+43.3
Majority		84	13.4	
Turnout		626	43.0	
Liberal Democrats gain from Independent		Swing		

Poughill and Stratton By-Election 16 September 2004
Party	Candidate	Votes	%	±%
Liberal Democrats	Nathan Bale	715	59.5	+17.8
Conservative		277	23.1	+4.0
Independent		142	11.8	−27.4
Independent		67	5.6	+5.6
Majority		438	36.4	
Turnout		1,201	32.0	
Liberal Democrats hold		Swing		

Bude By-Election 5 May 2005
Party	Candidate	Votes	%	±%
Liberal Democrats	Nigel Pearce	unopposed		
Liberal Democrats hold		Swing		

Bodmin St Mary's By-Election 16 February 2006
Party	Candidate	Votes	%	±%
Liberal Democrats	Tristan Trevenna	825	69.1	+31.0
Conservative	Lance Kennedy	368	30.8	+15.6
Majority		457	38.3	
Turnout		1,193	23.5	
Liberal Democrats gain from Independent		Swing		

Bude By-Election 16 March 2006
Party	Candidate	Votes	%	±%
Liberal Democrats	Paula Dolphin	651	63.8	+17.7
Conservative	Keith Marshall	288	28.2	+9.1
Independent	Brian Dixon	82	8.0	+8.0
Majority		363	35.6	
Turnout		1,021	28.3	
Liberal Democrats gain from Mebyon Kernow		Swing		

Bodmin St Petroc By-Election 27 April 2006
Party	Candidate	Votes	%	±%
Liberal Democrats	Arwen Folkes	821	63.9	+23.9
Conservative	John Phillips	463	36.1	+17.7
Majority		358	27.8	
Turnout		1,284	25.8	
Liberal Democrats hold		Swing		
