= Truro Aerodrome =

- British Ensign of Civil Aviation
- IATA: none; ICAO: EGHY

Summary
- Airport type: Private
- Operator: Truro Aerodrome Ltd
- Location: Truro
- Elevation AMSL: 400 ft / 122 m
- Coordinates: 50°16′43″N 005°08′33″W

Map
- Location in Cornwall

Runways
Direction	Length		Surface
Direction	m	ft	Surface
14/32	530	1,739	Grass

Truro Aerodrome (ICAO: EGHY) is an unlicensed aerodrome located 3 NM (5.6 km; 3.5 mi) west northwest of Truro, Cornwall, England, UK.

In 2012, its existence was threatened by plans for residential development associated with the proposed Stadium for Cornwall.
