= Kowethas an Yeth Kernewek =

Cornish language association

Kowethas an Yeth Kernewek (The Cornish Language Fellowship) is a Cornish language association which exists to promote, encourage and foster the use of the Cornish language.

Kowethas an Yeth Kernewek recognises the validity of all forms of revived Cornish, and membership is open to all, although most of the Kowethas' publications have been in Kernewek Kemmyn and the Standard Written Form (Middle).

Kowethas an Yeth Kernewek respects the rights of its members to use whichever form of Cornish they choose, although its written business is conducted in SWF (M) because that is the form used by the majority of its members.

Every month since late 1976 the society publishes a Cornish Language magazine called An Gannas which consists of articles, stories, news, comment and puzzles. Publishing is an important aspect of the work of the society. Amongst the variety of materials that have been produced are books, diaries, stories and language learning materials. Books with accompanying audio material are also published to assist beginners. The society also produces tea-towels, mugs, car stickers, pens, cards, T-shirts and other items for sale, all displaying the Cornish language. During the year the society organises a number of language events, such as an annual Cornish Language Weekend, and a Speak Cornish week, often supported by Cornish music or dancing, giving Cornish speakers the opportunity of meeting together in a Cornish speaking environment. Recent years has seen some events conducted by videoconferencing, extending the reach of the Kowethas to overseas members.

The society is closely associated with the running of Cornish classes throughout Cornwall and beyond. It maintains links with a wide range of other cultural organisations both in Cornwall and beyond, including language and educational organisations in other Celtic countries. The society is a voluntary body, (charity no. 1065527) and its funding is raised through grants, membership, sales and donations.

== See also ==
- Languages in the United Kingdom
