= Mullion (disambiguation) =

A mullion is a structural element which divides adjacent window units.

Mullion may also refer to:

- Mullion (geology), a geological term for structures formed by extension
- Mullion, Cornwall, a village and parish in Cornwall, England
- Mullion, New South Wales, a locality in Australia
- Mullion Cove, a harbour and cove in Cornwall, England
- Mullion Creek, New South Wales, a town in Australia
- Mullion Island, a small island in Mount's Bay, Cornwall, England
- Mullion School, in Mullion, Cornwall, England

== People with the surname ==
- Annabel Mullion (born 1969), English actress
