= Baulk Head to Mullion =

Coastal protected area in Cornwall, England

Coordinates: 50.0348°N 5.2641°W

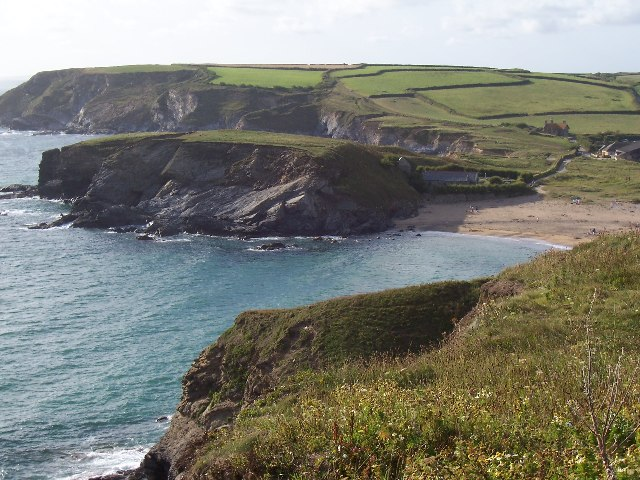
Church Cove and cliffs, part of the SSSI.

Baulk Head to Mullion is a coastal Site of Special Scientific Interest (SSSI) in Cornwall, England, UK, noted for both its biological and geological characteristics.

== Geography ==
The 152-hectare (380-acre) site straddles the west coast of the Lizard Peninsula, from Baulk Head in the north to Mullion Cove in the south, within the civil parishes of Mullion and Gunwalloe.

The South West Coast Path runs through the SSSI and parts of the coastline are owned by the National Trust.

== Flora and fauna ==
The SSSI contains several plant species listed in the Red Data Book of rare and endangered plant species, such as Hairy Greenweed, the moss Pottia starkenna, part of the Pottiaceae family, Fringed Rupturewort (Herniaria ciliolata) and the only recently recorded instances of wild leek (Allium ampeloprasum).
