= Santo Christo de Castello =

Armed Merchant Navy Ship

History

Republic of Genoa
- Name: Santo Christo de Castello
- Namesake: San Cristoforo Castle
- In service: 1667
- Out of service: 1667
- Home port: Amsterdam, Dutch Republic
- Fate: Wrecked near Mullion Cove off the coast of England, 7 October 1667

General characteristics
- Class & type: Merchant Galleon
- Complement: 120-130
- Armament: 48 guns

The Santo Christo de Castello, was a mid‐17th century Genoese armed merchant ship sailing from Amsterdam to Genoa, via Portugal and Spain, that was wrecked on its maiden near Mullion Cove, Cornwall, England in 1667. In the late 17th and 18th centuries various efforts were made to recover the silver it was said to have carried. It was then forgotten, but was rediscovered in 1969, and interesting artefacts have since been recovered.

== Maiden voyage ==
The Genoese galleon Santo Christo de Castello was sailing from Amsterdam to Genoa under Captain Lorenzo Viviano when it was wrecked. The ship was armed with 48 guns, some of which were bronze. She carried cloth, spices and a general cargo, including "piggs" of lead. This was the ship's maiden voyage.

== Wreck ==
Location in Cornwall

The Santo Christo de Costello was wrecked in a gale in October 1667 near the Lizard of Cornwall, England "between the growing and flowing back of the sea". The vessel took shelter from gales in Mount's Bay on 5 October 1667. After lying at anchor for two days, on 7 October 1667 it was driven ashore at Mullion Cove. Most of the 120 people on board escaped in the ship's boats, but 25 were drowned. Probably the ship sheltered too close to the cliffs and was caught when the wind shifted direction.

A document in Latin from shortly after the wreck authorizes the public sale by auction of what remained of the Sanctus Christus de Castello including her tackle and equipment, anchors, guns and ropes, goods, property, merchandise or objects of trade.

== Early salvage efforts ==
There is a wreck at Bumble Rock which is probably the Santo Christo de Castello. The wreck is in a shallow cove near Polurrian, Mullion, Cornwall. The ship had a lot of silver aboard, making it a target for divers ever since. In the late 17th and 18th centuries the Bumble Rock wreck was often visited by divers.

The London shipowner and merchant Philip Ford signed an agreement with King James II of England in September 1688 by which he could search for wrecks along the south coast of England and around the Isles of Scilly, paying 1/5 of the value to the King. He would pay another 1/5 to Sidney, Lord Godolphin, for treasure from ships owned by Godolphin found near the Isles of Scilly. Ford found four piggs near the Lizard holding 3,310 ounces (94,000 g) of silver and paid the King's fifth. The Bishop of Exeter claimed half the profits in his role as Vice-Admiral of South Cornwall, but his claim was rejected. The silver may well have come from the Santo Christo de Castello.

In the summer of 1732 the Eagle made a wreck-hunting voyage around the south of England. The expedition reached the Lizard in June, where they began diving on the wreck of the Royal Anne Galley, a 40-gun man of war that had been wrecked on the Stagg Rocks in November 1721, and on the wreck at Bumble Rock, the main target. In five weeks of diving they recovered some minor objects of little value from the man of war, and recovered nothing from Bumble Rock but some ballast stones and a small piece of much-eroded iron.

== Recent findings ==
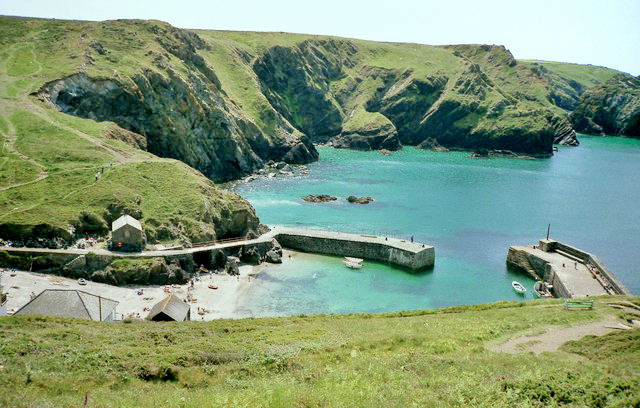
Mullion Cove on a calm day

The wreck was rediscovered in 1969 by Peter McBride. He worked with Roy Davis and Richard Larn, founder of the Shipwreck Centre, to explore the wreck, retrieve artefacts and identify the wreck. It became known as the "Mullion Pin Wreck" due to a large quantity of sewing pins that was found. Later a fragment of the ship's bell revealed the identity as the Santo Christo de Costello.

The divers found a sundial that fired a small cannon at a set hour and a brass statuette of a "tobacco boy". Other artefacts included religious objects and the ship's armament. The shipwreck contained "EB" clay tobacco pipes made by Eduard Bird (c. 1610–1665) of Amsterdam. A double-side medallion with the images of the saints Francis of Assisi and Anthony of Padua was recovered. In the summer of 1974 divers found a bronze statuette and a miniature bronze tobacco pipe from a matrix below one of the cannons.

The Shipwreck Centre in Charlestown, Cornwall holds a collection of objects recovered from the wreck. The National Maritime Museum in Greenwich, London has some of the brass and lead link shot.

== Sources ==
- Abstracts in Anthropology, 1976
- Bradley, James W.; DeAngelo, Gordon (Fall 1981), "European Clay Pipe Marks from 17th Century Onondaga Iroquois Sites", Archaeology of Eastern North America, 9, Eastern States Archeological Federation: 109–133, JSTOR 40897742
- Earle, Peter (8 July 2008), Treasure Hunt: Shipwreck, Diving, and the Quest for Treasure in an Age of Heroes, St. Martin's Press, ISBN 978-1-4299-8661-8
- Kingsley, Sean A.; Stemm, Greg (30 April 2013), Oceans Odyssey 3. The Deep-Sea Tortugas Shipwreck, Straits of Florida: A Merchant Vessel from Spain's 1622 Tierra Firme Fleet, Oxbow Books, ISBN 978-1-78297-149-8
- KTP1091 link shot, National Maritime Museum, Greenwich, London
- Larn, Richard (1 January 1981), Shipwrecks of Great Britain and Ireland, David & Charles, ISBN 978-0-7153-7491-7
- McBride, P.; Larn, R.; Davis, R. (September 1975), "A mid‐17th century merchant ship found near Mullion Cove 3rd interim report on the Santo Christo de Castello, 1667", The International Journal of Nautical Archaeology and Underwater Exploration, 4 (2), The Nautical Archaeology Trust Ltd.: 237–252, doi:10.1111/j.1095-9270.1975.tb00917.x
- Scholes, Daniel (23 October 2018), "The History Behind Some Of Cornwall's Most Renowned Shipwrecks", Cornwall Life
- "Shipwreck, unique collection of 1667 brass artifacts from Amsterdam", eBay, Charlestown Shipwreck Centre
