= Meaver =

Hamlet in Cornwall, England

Coordinates: 50.025°N 5.232°W

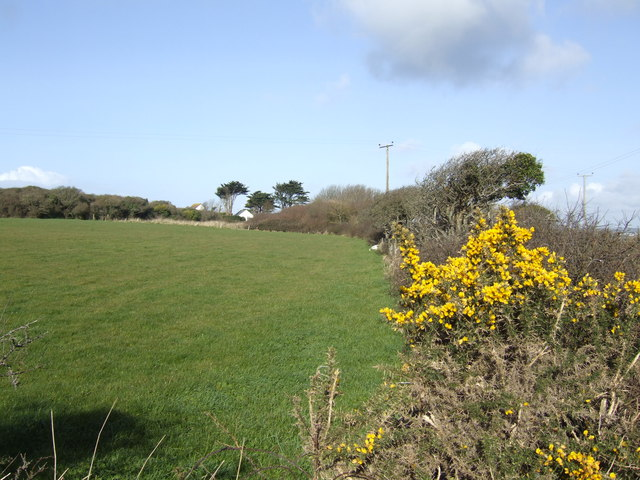
- Gorse in bloom at Meaver

- Location within Cornwall
- OS grid reference: SW686189
- Civil parish: Mullion
- Unitary authority: Cornwall
- Ceremonial county: Cornwall
- Region: South West
- Country: England
- Sovereign state: United Kingdom

Meaver is a hamlet east of Mullion and in the parish of Mullion in west Cornwall, England.
