= St Mellanus Church, Mullion =

Church in Mullion, Cornwall

St Mellanus Church
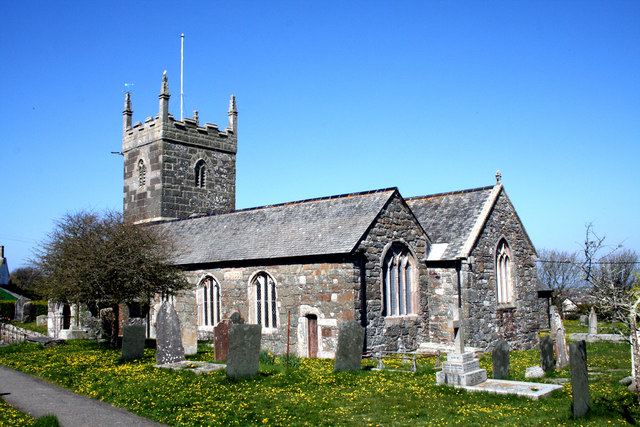
- St Mellanus Church
- 50.0279°N 5.2423°W
- Location: Mullion, Cornwall
- Country: England
- Denomination: Church of England

Administration
- Diocese: Truro
- Archdeaconry: Bodmin
- Deanery: Kerrier

St Mellanus church is a Grade I listed parish church in Mullion, on the Lizard Peninsula in Cornwall, England. The present building dates primarily from the 15th and early 16th centuries and includes a west tower, north and south aisles, and a south porch. The church is primarily known for its early 16th-century carved oak bench ends, combining Gothic and Renaissance decorative forms.

== History ==
The church of St Mellanus (also known as St Mullion or St Melan) is largely a 15th-century building, comprising a nave with north and south aisles, chancel, and south porch. It is dedicated to St Mellanus, a sixth-century bishop of Rennes in Brittany.

The earliest fabric may date from the 13th century, and the font is probably of the same period. The north and south aisles are later medieval additions. The north doorway, with its round arch, has been compared to Norman work but is now generally dated to the 16th century.

The west tower was constructed in the early 16th century. In 1691 part of the south wall of the south aisle was rebuilt, as recorded on a date stone. The church underwent restoration in 1840 and again in 1870 under the direction of the architect Frederick Eden.

St Mellanus was designated a Grade I listed building in 1957.

== Architecture ==
=== Structure and fabric ===
The church is constructed of rubble stone, including granite and serpentine, with granite ashlar used in the tower. The roofs are of dry slate. The nave and chancel share a continuous roof, with seven-bay north and south aisles that do not extend the full length of the nave.

The east window is a narrow three-light opening with late reticulated tracery, possibly of 19th-century date. The north aisle contains five Perpendicular windows, with a similar west window. An early studded oak door survives in the north aisle, notable for its wooden studs instead of the iron studs typical of later doors. The south aisle contains several three-light Perpendicular windows with four-centred arches.

In the south aisle, a low priest's door with a shallow-arched opening is located at the south-east. The wall between this doorway and the porch was rebuilt in 1691. A small opening at the base of the south door, is traditionally said to have been provided for shepherds’ dogs. The south porch has a parapeted gabled roof, with 19th-century detailing.

The unbuttressed west tower is built in two stages and is finished with a battlemented parapet and crocketed finials. Each face has a two-light belfry opening with pierced tracery and slate louvres.

=== Interior ===
The north and south arcades haveure seven bays with granite piers. Original unplastered wagon roofs survive over the nave, chancel, and aisles. In the chancel, carved figures holding shields appear at the base of the roof ribs, and the central boss is gilded.

An unusual feature of St Mellanus church is the floor, made of lime ash and laid using techniques that are no longer known.

=== Furnishings and fittings ===
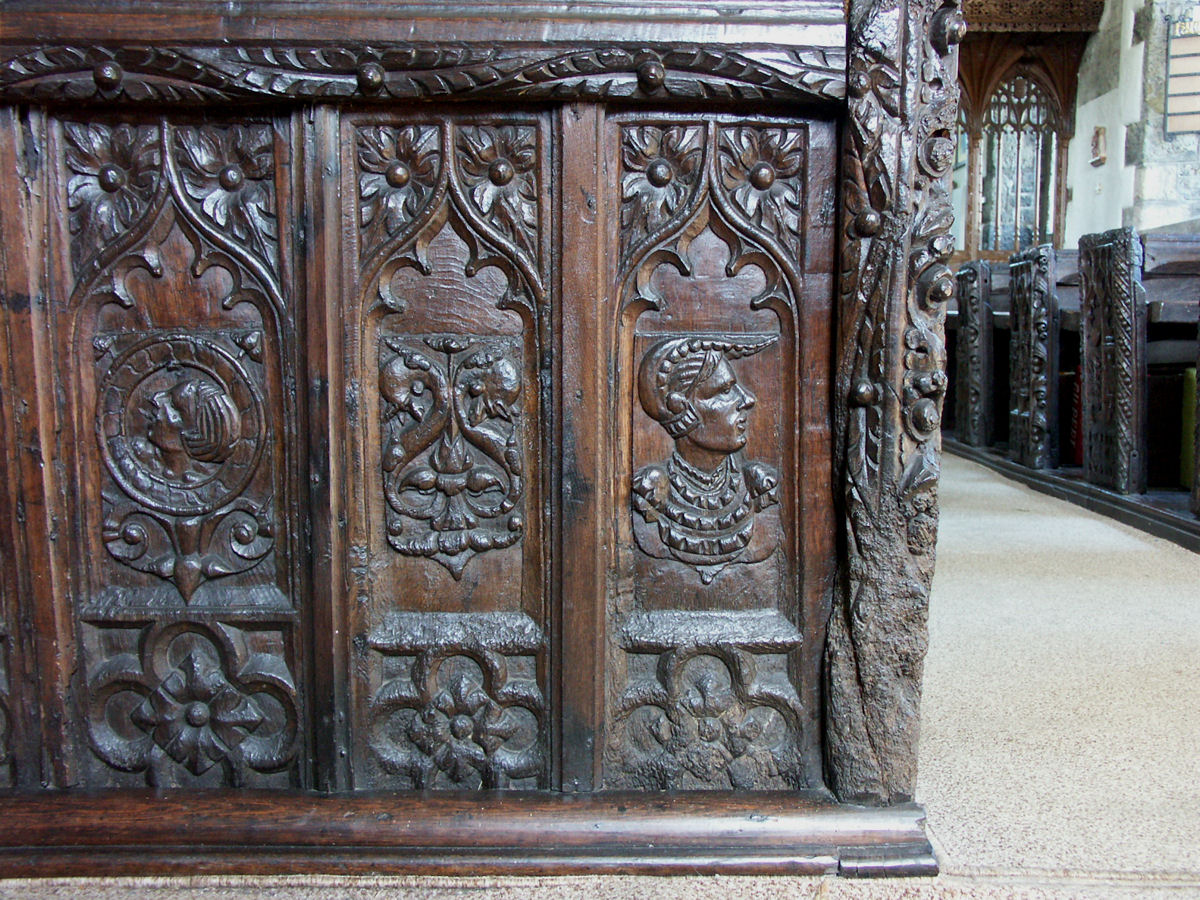
Carved bench ends, St Mellanus church

The chancel furnishings date to the 19th and 20th centuries. The church retains a complete set of oak benches dating from about 1530, with moulded top rails and carved bench ends combining Gothic and Renaissance features. The carved bench ends depict symbols of the Passion, the crucifixion, and Renaissance figures possibly interpreted as Judas Iscariot, Pontius Pilate, and others. The oak rood screen, built in the 15th or early 16th century, was heavily damaged during the Reformation.

Fittings include a painted coat of arms by Charles II over the north door, wall paintings on the south wall attributed to Samuel Triggs, and an east window containing 16th-century glass discovered beneath the chancel floor in 1840.

The octagonal font may date to the 15th century and features a carving of a serpent.

== Churchyard ==
A late medieval churchyard cross adjacent to the south porch was discovered in 1870 being used as a kerb stone near the lychgate and was re-erected on a modern base, where it now stands.
