= Predannack Airfield =

Royal Navy airfield in Cornwall, England

RNAS Predannack Predannack Airfield RAF Predannack
- Ayrborth Predennek
- Part of RNAS Culdrose (HMS Seahawk)
- Mullion, Cornwall
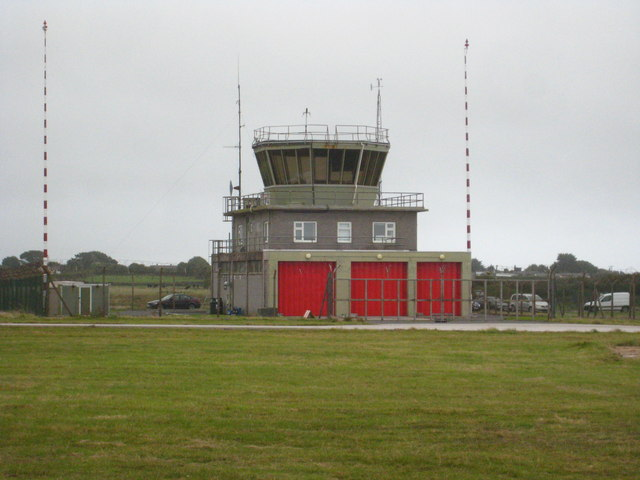
- Predannack Airfield control tower

Site information
- Type: Satellite Airfield
- Owner: Ministry of Defence
- Operator: Royal Air Force (1940-1958); Royal Navy (1958-present)

Location
- Location in Cornwall EGDO (the United Kingdom)
- Coordinates: 49°59′57″N 005°13′50″W

Site history
- Built: 1940–1
- In use: 1941–present

Airfield information
- Identifiers: ICAO: EGDO
- Elevation: 90 metres (295 ft) AMSL
Runways
Direction	Length and surface
18/36	1,405 metres (4,610 ft) Asphalt
13/31	884 metres (2,900 ft) Asphalt
09/27	1,309 metres (4,295 ft) Asphalt
05/23	1,821 metres (5,974 ft) Asphalt
- Tower callsign: Predannack Tower; Radio Freq: 122.10 (MHz)

Predannack Airfield (ICAO: EGDO) (Cornish: Ayrborth Predennek) is an aerodrome near Mullion on The Lizard peninsula of Cornwall in the United Kingdom. The runways are operated by the Royal Navy and today it is a satellite airfield and relief landing ground for nearby RNAS Culdrose.

== RAF Predannack ==
=== Second World War ===
==== Development ====
The capitulation of France in June 1940 gave impetus to the building of numerous airfields across South West England which was now vulnerable to attack by the Luftwaffe. RAF Predannack was opened in May 1941 as a satellite for RAF Portreath. Accommodation was dispersed over a wide area, with officers accommodated in the Mullion Cove and Polurrian Hotels. The number of personnel reached peak strength of 3,600 by 1944.

==== Operations ====
The first squadron to arrive was 247 (China-British) Squadron with Hawker Hurricanes, specialising in night defence of the South West's towns and ports. The night fighting element was later augmented by 1457 Flight flying Douglas Havoc aircraft with its unsuccessful Turbinlite searchlight tactics. However, the arrival of 600 (City of London) Squadron AAF with Bristol Beaufighters equipped with aircraft interception (AI) radar produced better results. Ground-controlled interception (GCI) in the area was covered by RAF Treleaver radar station.

The Luftwaffe attacked Predannack several times. The first attack on the night of 12 October 1941 followed a Beaufighter on approach and shot up the airfield. Defence soon gave way to offensive operations; fighter sweeps and intruder operations were undertaken over France. The airfield's southerly location made it also suitable for anti-shipping strikes over the Bay of Biscay. Westland Whirlwind and Beaufighter squadrons mounted successful patrols, followed later by a number of de Havilland Mosquito squadrons.

Predannack's location made it suitable for emergency landings, particularly with the growth of the bomber offensive against mainland Europe. Many RAF Bomber Command and US Eighth Air Force aircraft found haven at the base. As a result, the RAF agreed to extend the runways in 1943 for larger aircraft, including Vickers Wellington and Consolidated Liberator aircraft for anti-submarine warfare. This enabled Predannack to be a staging and departure point for aircraft en route to the North African Campaign. Late in 1942 some of the 67th TCG's Douglas C-47 Skytrains and the 81st Fighter Group's Bell P-39 Airacobras refuelled here before flying around the Iberian Peninsula.

In preparation for Operation Overlord, Nos 1 and 165 (Ceylon) Squadrons formed a wing of Supermarine Spitfire IXs at Predannack to prevent Luftwaffe aircraft from attacking Allied shipping. As the invasion convoy around Falmouth assembled, the Spitfires gave constant fighter cover. 179 Squadron equipped with Wellingtons and the Czechoslovak-crewed 311 Squadron equipped with Liberators undertook anti-submarine patrols over the Bay of Biscay and approaches to the English Channel. At its peak about 3,600 crew and support staff were at Predannack.

As the war became less intense in Predannack's area of operations, the station saw fighter squadrons arrive for rest and re-equipment. On VE Day no flying units were present, but two Mosquito squadrons returned. Predannack opened its gates to the public when on 15 September 1945 4,000 visitors arrived for the Battle of Britain air display.

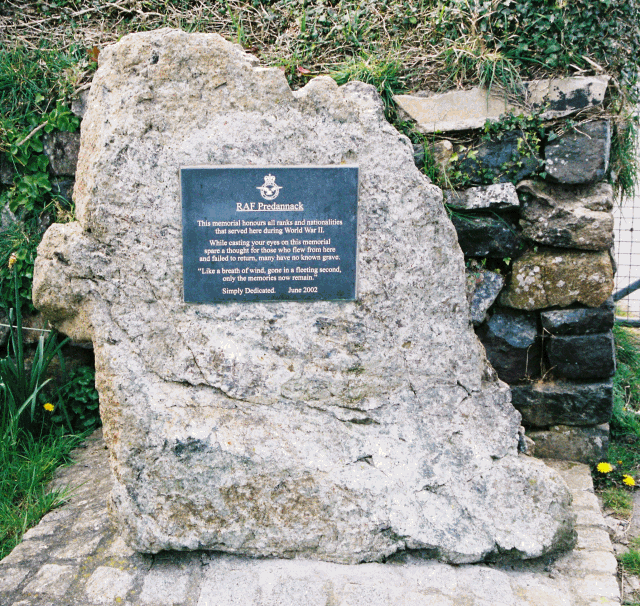
Second World War monument at Predannack main gate, April 2007

A plaque at the entrance, commemorating those who served at RAF Predannack during the Second World War was unveiled on 11 June 2002. It reads: "Like a breath of wind gone in a fleeting second only the memories now remain".

=== Post-war ===
151 Squadron, with its different types of Mosquitos, continued flying from Predannack until April 1946, and the following month the airfield closed, being reduced to care and maintenance.

After a period of experimental use by Vickers-Armstrongs (Aircraft) Ltd under the supervision of Barnes Wallis from 1951 to September 1957, the base was taken over by the Royal Navy on 15 December 1958. The airfield now operates as a satellite airfield for nearby RNAS Culdrose, to handle intensive helicopter operations and as a relief landing ground. There is also a small arms range on the site and the RN Fire Fighting School moved here in 1971.

== Current use ==
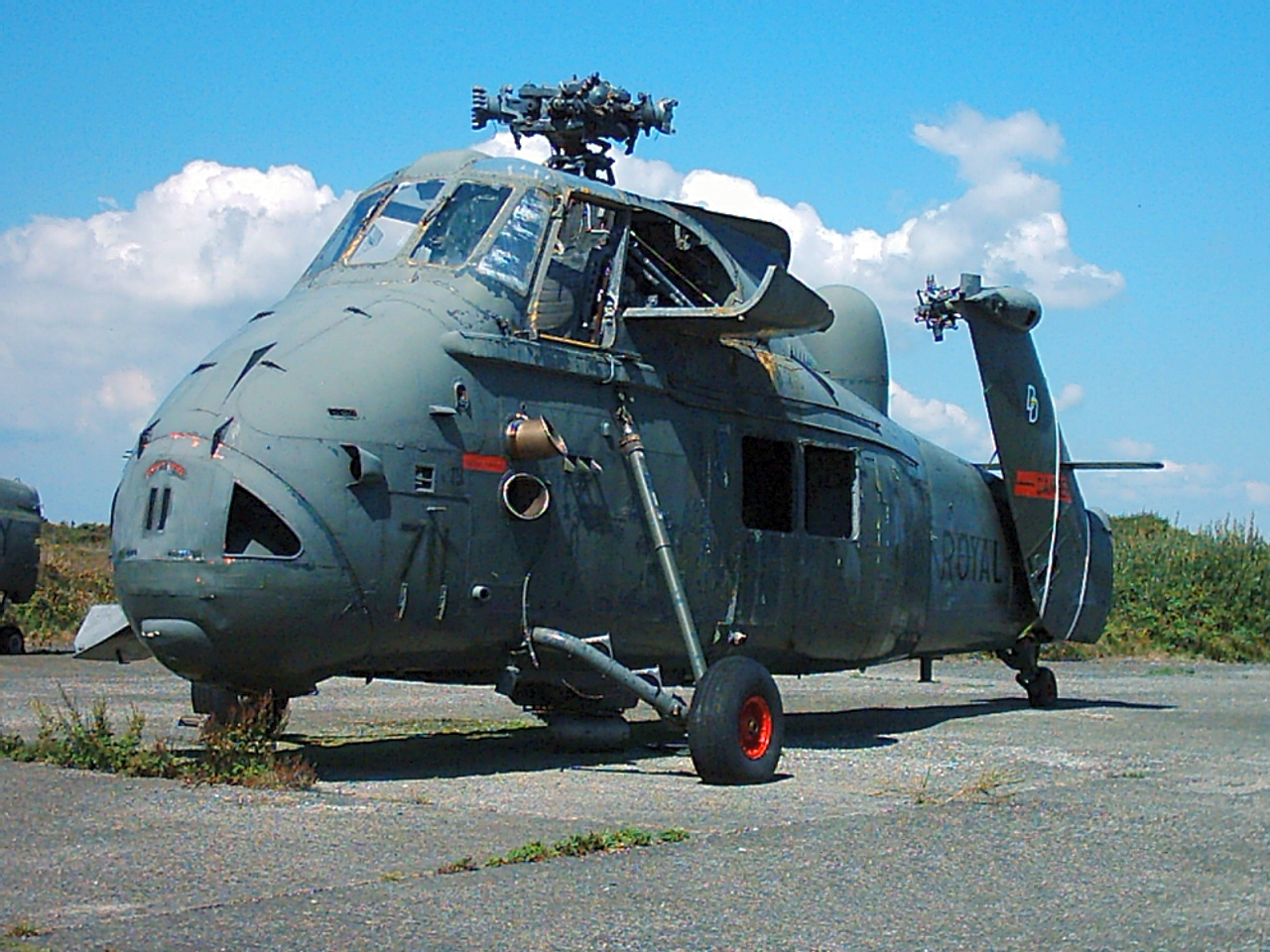
Wessex HAS.3 at Predannack Fire School

Predannack Airfield is routinely used for training purposes by helicopters from the Royal Navy. RNAS Culdrose is the Aerodrome Operator and responsible for actively managing and running the satellite airfield.

It is also the practise base of Royal Naval School of Flight Deck Operations, which has a number of dummy aircraft for fire extinguishing practice.

700X Naval Air Squadron continually use the airfield to operate Remotely Piloted Air Systems into the south coast exercise areas.

626 Volunteer Gliding Squadron unit operated by the RAF Air Cadets are also a lodger unit based at Predannack Airfield The airfield is also used by Goonhilly Model Flying Club (with MoD permission) and there has been hobby model flying on the field since the 1950s. The site is currently used by the international disaster relief agency Shelterbox as part of its Academy for Disaster Relief.

=== Jollytown ===
Two semi-detached cottages, part of the St Just Estate, are in an isolated position on the west side of the airfield and can be reached only by the main airfield gate and the airfield perimeter road. The painter and etcher Bryan Ingham occupied the western cottage from 1958 until his death in 1997.

== Scientific interest ==
On the west side of the spectacular Lizard Peninsula, parts of the base away from the operational areas are in a Site of Special Scientific Interest (SSSI) for its combination of botany (including orchids, Cornish heath, magic mushroom), zoology (including butterflies, and snakes notably the venomous common adder) and geology (bastite and serpentinite).

== See also ==
- List of topics related to Cornwall
- List of former Royal Air Force stations
