= Mullion School =

Coordinates: 50.0252°N 5.2375°W

Location
- Meaver Road; Mullion, Helston, Cornwall, TR12 7EB; United Kingdom

Information
- Type: Academy
- Local authority: Cornwall Council
- Trust: Truro and Penwith Academy Trust
- Department for Education URN: 143993 Tables
- Ofsted: Reports
- Headteacher: Michelle Dunleavy
- Staff: 38
- Gender: Both male and female
- Age: 11 to 16
- Enrolment: 552
- Houses: Budoc, Gerent, Yestin and Ricat.
- Colours: Blue, Green, Red and Yellow
- Website: http://www.mullionschool.org.uk/

Mullion School is a coeducational secondary school located in Mullion, which is on the Lizard Peninsula in Cornwall, England, UK The year groups are seven to eleven. Mullion school was declared open by The Prince of Wales on 20 May 1980. The school's logo is the arctic tern, which has a migration pattern of 5 years as it goes from the North Pole to the South Pole: the same amount of time as it takes to go through secondary school.

Previously a foundation school and Performing Arts College administered by Cornwall Council, in June 2017 Mullion School converted to academy status. The school is now sponsored by Truro and Penwith Academy Trust.

== Achievements ==
A 2011 Ofsted report noted 'The school has attained a number of awards including the silver Artsmark, Investors in People (Silver Award), Healthy School and Dyslexia Friendly School awards' and found it to be an 'outstanding school', the highest grading.
