= Mullion Island =

Island in Cornwall, United Kingdom

Native name: Enys Pryven
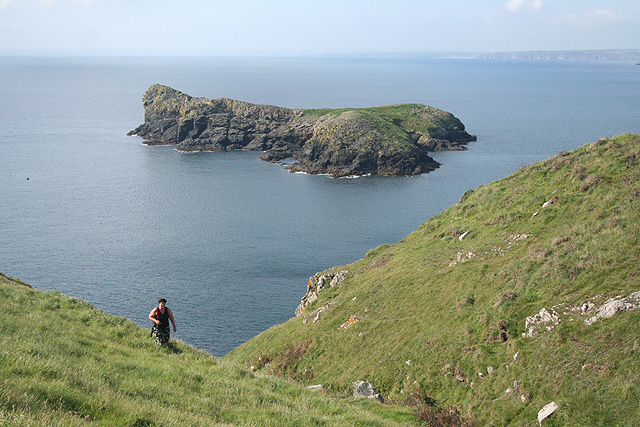
- Mullion Island
- Interactive map of Mullion Island

Geography
- Location: Atlantic Ocean
- Coordinates: 50°0′44″N 5°16′0″W
- Highest elevation: 36 m (118 ft)

Mullion Island (Cornish: Enys Pryven, lit. 'worm island') is an uninhabited island on the eastern side of Mount's Bay, Cornwall, in the United Kingdom. It is approximately half a mile (0.8 km) offshore from Mullion Cove, 1 mile (1.6 km) in circumference and the highest point is 118 feet (36 m) above sea level. It forms part of the Lizard Peninsula Area of Outstanding Natural Beauty and is within the Mullion Cliff to Predannack Cliff Site of Special Scientific Interest.

== Geography and geology ==
The rocks of the island were formed 350 million years ago, with most formed in a fashion similar to the Mid-Atlantic Ridge today, where lava flows from an under-water split in the Earth's crust, and cools rapidly on the sea-bed as basalt, forming large rounded lumps known as pillow lava, many with a chilled margin. Mullion Island was formed by a separate (later) volcanic episode than the nearby Lizard complex rocks. The soils, developed from the underlying basalt and slate, has been highly manured by bird droppings, rich in nitrogen and phosphate, and sea beet (Beta vulgaris subsp maritima) and tree mallow (Lavatera arborea) are the dominant plants. Great black-backed gull (Larus marinus) breed on the island, along with common guillemot (Uria aalge), Eurasian oystercatcher (Haematopus ostralegus) and possibly razorbill (Alca torda). European shag (Gulosus aristotelis) and great cormorant (Phalacrocorax carbo) were also on the island during a visit by West Cornwall Ringing Group on 16 June 2015.

A visit by National Trust rangers in 2019 found the island littered with thousands of elastic bands. It is thought that the gulls mistake the bands for food while feeding in fields on the mainland and are later regurgitated by birds roosting on the island. Small bundles of twine and green fishing net was also found along with a dead gull with a 10 cm fishing hook.

== History ==
Before the First World War the Mullion pilchard seine companies posted a huer (a lookout) on the island to watch for the dark patch of a nearby shoal of pilchards. The island was previously owned by the Lords Robartes of Lanhydrock who sold it to the Meyer family during the 1920s. The Meyers gave it to the National Trust in 1945.

The island was used for location shots for the 2015 television serial And Then There Were None, based on a novel by Agatha Christie.
