= Mullion Cove =

Small community in Cornwall, England

- Porth Mellin
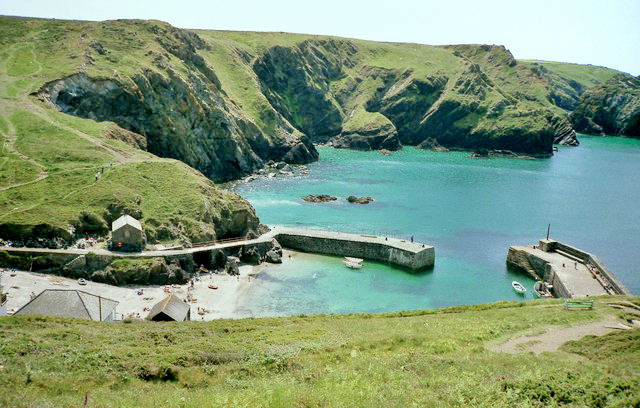
- Mullion Cove and the harbour, taken from a point at the top of the slipway at the site of the old capstan

- Location in Cornwall
- Location: The Lizard, Cornwall, England
- Coordinates: 50.015°N 5.258°W
- Type: Cove

Mullion Cove, or Porth Mellin, (Cornish: Porth Melin) is a small community on the West Coast of the Lizard Peninsula in Cornwall, England, and on the eastern side of Mount's Bay. The Cove forms part of the parish of Mullion, and is accessible by road from Mullion village, 1 mile (1.6 km) to the northeast, and also via the South West coast path. It lies within an Area of Outstanding Natural Beauty.

The cove is 5 miles (8 km) south of Porthleven and 14 miles (23 km) southeast of Penzance by sea. It is 6 miles (9.7 km) south of Helston by land and 13 miles (21 km) southwest of Falmouth by land. In 1937, a 2-mile (3.2 km) stretch of the coast from Mullion Cove to Predannack was preserved for the nation with the help of the Council for the Preservation of Rural England and the National Trust.

The cove is partly protected from the strong winds and ocean currents in the region by Mullion Island or (Enys Pryven in Cornish), which lies about 720 yards (660 m) offshore to the southwest.

Occupancy of the Mullion Cove goes back several hundred years, but in the early 1800s, it had three working Grist Mills, including "Criggan Mill, Mullion Mill Farm" (List Entry Number 1141889) (currently listed as Criggan Mill, Mullion Cove), and by the Census of 1841 the Cove had several working fish cellars, net lofts and two thatched cottages.

Until the early 20th century, it had a thriving inshore pilchard seine fishing industry, was part of the Mounts Bay Fishery and also had an abundant history of crab, lobster and crawfish fishing using traditional Cornish methods with locally manufactured withy pots.

Between 1890 and 1892, and between 1895 and 1897, a harbour of two stone piers, mostly made from granite, serpentine and elvan with a concrete core was constructed with the financial help of Lord Robartes of Lanhydrock for both coastal protection and to provide support and an economic base for fishermen, local farmers and local traders at a time when agriculture was going through a depression. Viscount Clifden was the largest landowner in the parish of Mullion. In 1928 the harbour, island, and fish cellars were bought from Viscount Clifden by Montague Meyer. By 1944 the harbour required extensive maintenance and repair. In 1945, 12 acres (5 ha) including the harbour and island were given by the Meyer family to the National Trust, which took on necessary repairs. The Trust still has ownership, control and responsibility for maintenance.

In October 1984, three locations within the harbour area were granted Grade II Listed status. The list includes:

- the two harbour walls or piers (English Heritage Building ID Number 1158181)
- the net loft, listed as a "harbour cottage" (List Entry Number 1328501)
- and the nearby Winch House (List Entry Number 1158171).

All are listed under the Planning (Listed Buildings and Conservation Act) 1990 (as amended) for their special architectural or historic interest. About 300 yards (270 m) to the east of the Cove, and visible from the approach road to the harbour, is a mill listed as "Criggan Mill" (List Entry Number 1141889) which was given Grade II Listed status in January 1980. It is one of three mills which were last known working together in the Cove in the mid 1840s.

The coastal environment has long been adversely affected by storms, sea level rise and climate change, and evidence shows that damage has occurred on an increasingly dramatic and costly level, most recently in the period from 2011 to present. Beginning in 2003 the National Trust indicated that "Mullion Cove may not stand the ravages of the sea much longer." A survey in 2006 threw doubt on the future of the harbour.

== History ==
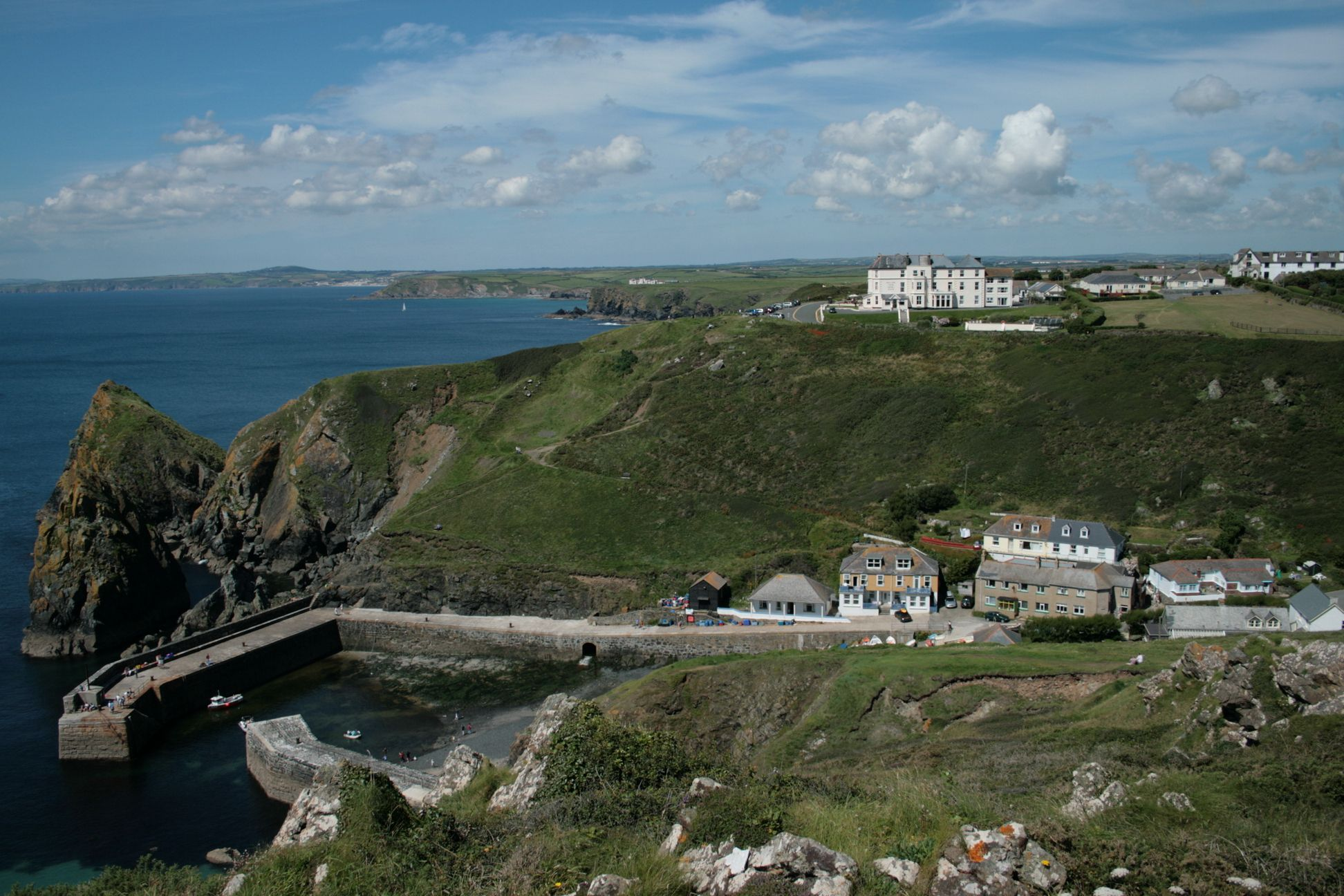
Mullion Cove

One of the earliest stories involving Mullion Cove revolves around an event that took place in Mount's Bay during the reign of Queen Elizabeth I. In August 1588, the invading Spanish Armada was first spotted from the Rill on the Lizard Peninsula. After the battle, relations with Spain continued to be poor. On the south coasts of England and Cornwall, many marine engagements continued with the enemy. However, in July 1595, a large Spanish expedition of over a hundred ships sailed towards Cornwall. By mid-July, it was stationed between Falmouth and Penzance. While a larger fleet stood off in Mount's Bay, four Spanish galleys were sent on a mission and arrived out of the fog near Mousehole. Without warning, they invaded several villages, setting fire to houses and public buildings before killing many of the occupants. They attacked Mousehole, Paul, Newlyn, and Penzance. The Anglican Church at Paul was burnt to the ground. Two hundred armed Spaniards landed from the galleys and spent two days plundering the area. They faced little resistance but were short of water. The small fleet sailed on following the Lizard Coast, and a welcome change in the direction of the wind allowed them to escape the gathering English ships led by Sir Francis Drake. This was the first time in hundreds of years that England had been invaded.

Cornwall was not well-defended at that time and was a long way from the seaborne navy at Plymouth and London. It was important to provide an early warning system and this attack led to the creation of a "Ring of Fire" along the north and south coasts and around Mount's Bay. A series of beacons were created at high vantage points around the Lizard and Mount's Bay. These were also to be manned at night and lit at the first sign of invasion. Mullion Cove, commanding a superb view of Mounts Bay was selected as one of the beacon sites, close to what is now the current site of the Mullion Cove Hotel. In 1743, Captain Taylor of the Daking en route from Chester to London reported that he was chased by a Spanish privateer and managed to get under the defense of the cannon in Mount's Bay.

There may even have been a cannon near to the site on Henscath as there is today to provide additional defense. A story emerged that one night an old man employed as a night watchman, saw a boat come into view heading for the landing area. Taken aback he shouted down to what was actually a fishing boat returning home late. He shouted "Who goes here?" to the occupants of the boat and received the reply "Fish and Panniers." Being confused and surprised he interpreted the reply as "French and Spaniards" and immediately panicked before rushing off to light the Beacon fearing an enemy attack was imminent. The sky was soon lit up and seen by other Beacon watchers who lit their own Beacons as instructed and before long the "Ring of Fire" was ablaze, putting the local Cornish populace into a fearful state for their lives and ready for an invasion: We can only guess at how long it took for the true story to come out and the embarrassment caused. Although there has been a fishing cove at Mullion for several hundred years a small seine fishery began in the early 1700s with fish being processed at Newlyn.

In 1793, the Seine Fishery here began to expand in association with Fish Cellars and Merchant businesses at Newlyn and Penzance. A change was seen in the Cove with the construction of a number of large Fish Cellars for processing the fish catch. In 1809, local newspapers carried an advertisement "... auction sale of the Mullion Pilchard and Herring Fishery, carried on at Mullion and Newlyn, including a New- Built Cellar capable of curing over twelve hundred hogsheads of fish enclosing an excellent salt cellar, commodious Lofts and a pump well supplied with water. Also included in the auction are 5 Stop seines, 2 Tuck Seines, with Boats, tackle and materials." The entrance to the Cove was also widened to incorporate more boats with the removal of rocks.

By the 1840s the two Grist Mills on the north side of the Cove were becoming less efficient and ceased to operate around 1846–1847 following the Sale of Mullion Mill Farm, and 3 Grist Mills occupied by John Williams. These were reported to be in good working order at the time of the Sale. This left only the one Mill in operation at Criggan (also spelt Criggian or Creggian).

By 1848, there were two cottages built for residence by local Coastguard officers and their families. These now form Cove Cottage. A description of the Cove was recorded as follows, "Mullion Cove contains a Mill worked by a stream running down through the valley, some fish cellars and a few humble cottages, on which last, owing to the height of the rising ground behind them, the sun, in the winter months, never shines. In one of these lives an old man who has been blind for many years who ... is glad indeed when the month of March is come, for he finds his solitary walk up and down the road in front of his cottage more cheerful when he feels the blessed sunshine falling on his sightless eyes."

At this time there was one Fishing family recorded as living in the cove. In 1867, the stream leading into the Cove was diverted under the roadway into the course of the old Leat to build the Lifeboat House. In 1868 came the first significant move to build a harbour in Mullion Cove. The strong sea currents around the Lizard, combined with adverse weather, sometimes prevented ships which had often sailed halfway around the world from completing their journey around the Lizard into the English Channel. Many of the sailing ships, for years, took a course which led them towards Falmouth to obtain new Orders for delivery of their cargo, to repair damage and to restock. Some took the wrong course in bad weather, storm or fog.

In easterly or northeasterly winds, ships were forced to anchor and shelter along the coastline between Mullion Island and Pedngwynian. Pedngwynian (Location 50°02`3.46" N 5°16`50.44" W) is a headland which lies 1 mile (1.6 km) to the north of Mullion Island between Dollar Cove and Gunwalloe Fishing Cove, in what was known as the "Mullion Roads," which, although undefined, stretched out into the Mounts Bay. The sailing ships often sheltered in the "Roads" because they could not navigate the strong tidal currents of the Lizard alongside strong easterly winds and this was the only suitable location for them to anchor. At other times many became trapped or embayed in Mounts Bay by southwesterly or westerly winds which eventually forced them onto the cliffs when they could not tack out to sea.

Shipwrecks were reputed to have received short shrift on the coast of the Lizard Peninsula in the period between the 15th and 19th centuries and even now the remains of Protected shipwrecks which were laden with gold, silver and jewellery still lie in the Mullion Roads. Some had their cargoes unceremoniously removed at will by local people referred as "the countryfolk," who quickly arrived in large numbers at the scene. Cargoes of wine and spirits were particular favourites. On 20 February 1492 there is a record of fighting among local people from the local Parish of Winnianton and Cury while taking the cargo from a ship wreck on Loe Bar. Some of the cargo was later found in the Church Store at Cury. However, the largest treasure ship to fall foul of local torment was in January 1527 when the 300 ton Carrack "San Antonio" or St Anthony belonging to the King of Portugal, en route from Lisbon to Antwerp and laden with, among other things a valuable cargo of bullion, plate, silver, precious stones, jewellery and armour was wrecked at Gunwalloe/Loe Bar north of Mullion Cove in a storm. What happened at the wreck led to an international incident and for many years afterwards remains of the cargo regularly washed ashore. In 1683 a 400-ton Dutch Fluyt cargo carrier Schiedam was retaken from a Pirate Corsair off Gibraltar by Captain Sir Cloudsley Shovell and subsequently became a Cargo ship for the Navy. In 1684 when sailing from Tangiers loaded with Army Miners, horses, timber, cannon and stores she was driven ashore at Jangye Ryn (now known as Dollar Cove) near Gunwalloe Church Cove in a storm. The wreck site is protected now but regularly dived upon. Again it was reported that local residents were responsible for stripping the ship and cargo.

On 14 November 1721 a Dutch cargo ship, probably the St Peter sailing from Rochelle with a cargo of Brandy, Saffron and other goods ran ashore on a sandy beach in the bay below Mullyon Church. She was not damaged and there was hope that she could be saved. As was the custom then, men were sent to guard her but her cargo was removed by "countryfolk" from two adjacent Parishes. In the ensuing melee many locals got drunk and a fire was started on the ship which burnt two of the gang who were drunk below deck. On the night of the 16th, the Officer in charge of the area Col. Savil despatched Lieutenant Maitland commanding 26 men to deal with the incident and 7 local men were captured.

In the early 1800s many thousands of cargo ships were to pass between Lands End and Falmouth on their travels. Even in the early 1700s and 1800s there were still many Privateers on the water from countries including France and Spain out to capture a prize from around the Lizard. In September 1725, after a severe storm and South Westerly gales, six ships were lost in the Mounts Bay and most of the crew were drowned. Two of these ships were smugglers, three were coastal coal carriers and one was a Norwegian Timber carrier.

Many English ships traveled in convoy with an armed Naval vessel on their journey around the English coast. In May 1781 a French Privateer, an armed Lugger Defiance under the command of Lieutenant Louis Le Ture with 45 men onboard was chased from Mullion Island by a Naval Vessel, under the charge of a Captain Curlyon placed there for the purpose by the Admiralty. The chase lasted for 14 hours before it was captured. The Privateer had sailed from St Malo two days earlier on a mission to capture ships off the Cornish Coast. Many of the French crew would have been placed on captured prize ships and returned them to France. In some storms here convoys could lose their armed escort and become easy targets for the Privateers. Witnesses onshore at Marazion could supply no help and could only watch as two Privateers took two unnamed large sailing ships, a schooner from St Ives and a brig from Swansea in one day in February 1746.

In January 1817 the Resolution, a brigantine sailing from Porto to London carrying wine and fruit was wrecked on the west Lizard Coast. Locals attacked the ship taking away all the property of the Captain and crew, and 4/5ths of the cargo of wine and in two days damaged the ship beyond repair. About 14 Dragoons were sent from Helston but failed to control the crowd. A Penzance clergyman, believed to be Rev G.C. "Bosun" Smith, wrote "The dangers of the coast between St. Michaels Mount and the Lizard are too well known to need description ... Natural depravity and the customs of centuries have inspired the inhabitants of the coast with a rapacity for plundering those wrecks and the name of wreckers applies therefore to vast numbers who look for the season of booty."

In December 1862 the Truro schooner Arwenack, 92 tons register, with a cargo of Copper Ore from Devoran, bound for South Wales lost her masts in a storm in the Mounts Bay. The crew were believed to have abandoned her. The coastguard at Mullion Cove saw a small boat capsize outside the breakers, the boat and oars coming ashore with no one aboard. The Arwenack, drifting in the southerly gale went aground in a cliff bound cove between Gunwalloe Church Cove and Poldhu. Within an hour 50 men were found to be in the process of taking away the cargo. Most of the boat had been stripped and less than one ton of the Copper Ore remained. The crew of 5, 4 Cornishmen and a Prussian all drowned. The movement against "wrecking" (unauthorised removal of goods from a shipwreck), began in the 1740s with condemnation of the practice by Methodist preacher John Wesley.

Wrecks were often remembered by the cargo they carried and it was not unusual for local people to take advantage to help save crew and cargo. In July 1815 a Dutch barque carrying a cargo of Tea went aground and broke up off Mullion, the crew and cargo coming ashore. It became known as the "Tea wreck". In August 1832 a large barque was wrecked between Kynance and Mullion Cove. It was known as the "Coffee Wreck." In 1850 a Falmouth owned schooner called the Windrush from Malaga, 51 tons register and built in 1833 at Cowes was driven ashore in a severe SW gale at Church Cove between Mullion and Gunwalloe. The 5 crew members were all drowned and the wreck quickly became matchwood. It was carrying a cargo which included a large quantity of lemons and raisins and was recalled as the "Fruit wreck." It was locally owned at Falmouth. There was no plunder of the wreck or cargo which was later sold. In 1667 one wooden ship, believed to be Genoan Merchantman, the Santo Christo de Castello, was last seen near to Mullion Island but the wreck is now believed to lie at Pol-Glas close to Polurrian. Part of its large cargo, a large quantity of Pins, were later recovered by divers. It was referred to as the "Pin wreck."

On the night of 20 June 1838, following a gale from the SSW, an Italian barque, believed to be the Silius (or Silio), Captain Paturzo, carrying 300 tons of salt was carried into Mullion Cove and went aground at night in fog at Carrag Luz. When located the following morning there were no crew aboard, and no cargo. Of the 15 crew who were all believed to have drowned a total of 11 were buried in Mullion Churchyard. It was known locally as the "dead wreck." During a gale on the night of Thursday 11 April 1839 a large number of ships, about 40 in number, anchored for safety near Mullion Island. As the weather worsened several ships slipped their anchors. Having lost their anchors some ships were driven as far north as Porthleven. Some managed to get safely to sea but others were driven ashore between Carrag Luz, Pedn-y-ke and Meres Ledges. These were the schooner Penrice Castle, carrying coal from Swansea to Falmouth, the schooner William and Catherine of Padstow and the smack Laura from Porthmadoc to King's Lynn. The last two were carrying slate. Being no Lifeboat at hand many crew took to small boats and reached the safety of nearby ships still at anchor, however these three soon became a total loss. Another ship, a large barque carrying oil was saved after almost being driven ashore. Other ships either fouled anchors or their anchors were totally lost. The Penrice Castle was a brand new schooner belonging to C. R. M. Talbot, the MP for Glamorganshire. The sale of the remains of the three wrecked ships only made 30 pounds. The confusion created by such a situation, which occurred in almost total darkness is highlighted by the fact that the owner of the Penrice Castle attempted to take a court action at the Admiralty Court against the owner of the Benjamin, another of the 40 ships who he believed was responsible for the damage, to recover his losses. However this action failed through lack of evidence. Such confusing situations occurred regularly around Mullion Cove and highlighted the reasons for the regular loss of ships and crew.

Between Lizard Point and Porthleven (part of the Penzance Port Area), during the 15 years between 1859 and 1874, there were 32 shipwrecks. Of these, 18 were embayed before hitting rocks and drifting onshore, while 8 wrecks resulted from collisions with other ships. These two factors alone accounted for 80% of the wrecks along this coast during this period.

On the same stretch of coastline in the next six years, up to 1880, there were only two embayments of small galliots, one at Loe Bar and one at Poldhu, and no loss of life. But there were eleven wrecks recorded, six of which resulted from ships striking the Stag Rocks at the Lizard Point.

It was recorded that in the 18th and 19th centuries there could be well over 200–300 sailing ships at anchor in the "Mullion Roads" for periods of up to two or three weeks at a time, their journeys delayed, and with limited means of restocking. From the mid 1830s there were several proposals for additional harbours around Cornwall, in particular for harbours of refuge, where ships could anchor and not be bound by the state of the tide. In January 1867, following a series of bad storms and shipwrecks at Mullion resulting in several drownings, an important public meeting was held in Mullion village, chaired by Rev Harvey with calls both for a lifeboat to be sited at Mullion and consideration being given to the formation of a Harbour of Refuge in the Cove itself.

In 1868 the plans for the development of Mullion were submitted to the Board of Trade for approval: there were two proposals. At that time there was a large stream supplying the Cove which ran down the centre of the slipway which was used to draw up the fishing boats. Already there was a second man- made watercourse or Leat which until about 1840 supplied two Grist Mills in the Cove itself. First, a jetty or causeway was to be built on the northern quayside, parallel to the leat running west towards Scovern or Ear Rock.

At the seaward end of this quay, the jetty was to turn north towards Henscath, then west towards the gateway between Henscath and Scovern, creating a protective horseshoe-shaped dam, and a harbour where fishing boats and other sailing boats could load or unload their cargoes. Rocks would be removed from the floor of the fishing cove, which was to remain open, and fishing boats would still be drawn up the slipway.

The second part of the overall plan was to create a sheltered area for larger sailing ships and smaller coasting and fishing boats in the Cove by building a breakwater, 630 feet (190 m) in length, between Mullion Island and the Vro, a large rock on the mainland 500 yards (460 m) to the south west. These plans were not proceeded with. Discussions with the Government regarding the introduction of Harbours of Refuge in the South West of England continued well into the 1880s.

In 1889 the Plans were resurrected and presented to the Board of Trade for the proposed construction of a Harbour at Mullion Cove. Notice of Intention was posted in Newspapers of the day, indicating that an application would be made on or before 23 December. The Financial Support was provided by the Right Hon Thomas Charles Baron Robartes of Lanhydrock and Truro. The plans were for a pier or jetty commencing on the mainland opposite Ear Rock and extending north towards Henscath, also a jetty or breakwater commencing on the mainland extending from Henscath to the North side of Ear Rock, creating a "horseshoe" shaped harbour. This part was similar to Plans proposed in 1868. However the second part of the proposal, to create a sheltered "harbour of refuge" in the cove, was dispensed with. The plans were presented to the Board of Trade in May 1890 and initially accepted. A Provisional Order allowing work to commence was issued.

The work to extend a northern causeway began with the consolidation and rebuilding of the road from Mullion Village to the Cove, a road approximately a mile in length which could adequately bear the weight of the machinery and stone. However, Penzance-born Sir William Matthews KCMG (1844–1922), a Member of the Institution of Civil Engineers, and in charge of the construction plans, decided that "heave" created by tidal sea swell (rhythmical rising of the sea) in the "horseshoe" would be too dangerous for the boats which could only lie alongside the quay in moderate weather. The building cost was also regarded as excessive.

As a result, in August 1890, Matthews proposed amended plans which included the construction of two stone piers. First, a west pier, 180 feet (55 m) in length, beginning in the northwest corner of the cove, was to extend southwards into the fishing cove from the end of the northern quayside. Second, a similarly built south pier, 130 feet (40 m) in length, was to extend seawards from a mainland rock on the south side of the fishing cove. This became known as the 1891 Amendment Order. It also gave Lord Robartes the authority to build a south pier at a later date. He did not apply to the Board of Trade for permission to build a south pier until July 1895.

Most of the stone for the construction was obtained locally. Serpentine and other local stone, it was suggested, was obtained from a site supposedly in the Cove itself known locally as the "Devils Apron Strings", a triangular pyramid of broken rock material from the cliffside. (The earliest reference to a site called the "Devils Apron Strings" was recorded in a book called "A week at the Lizard" by Rev Johns some 44 years earlier and is based on a story in Cornish Folklore, actually describing it as being near a cliff fall of Serpentine near the Rill, Kynance). The Granite came from the West of England Granite Quarries at Penryn, and 2000 tons of Portland cement was used in the construction.

A number of skilled stonemasons and other labourers were drafted into the village, coming from all over South West England, with T.A. Lang and Sons, of Liskeard, in charge of construction. The engineers in charge of the site were S.W. Jenkin and Son, also of Liskeard. They began the removal of bedrock and construction of the pier. Building work on the west pier began in earnest in 1891, but was affected by adverse weather including the Great Blizzard of March 1891. The west pier was completed in December 1892, when it was opened by Lord and Lady Robartes in an official ceremony with a procession which involved many guests and people from the village, and a speech at the village Reading Room. Construction of the south pier was delayed to reduce cost.

An application was made to the Board of Trade in July 1895 and permission to build "a pier about 150-foot in length on the south west side of Mullion cove extending in a north westerly direction towards the end of the existing pier" was granted, although initial construction did not begin until late 1895, when the construction firm Peacocks brought their machinery and materials to the site. Before construction of the south pier could start, the (currently Grade II Listed) Net Loft had to be reduced in size to allow free passage of equipment and materials.

It was hoped that the main beneficiaries of the new harbour would be those employed by the local pilchard, crab, lobster and crawfish fishery. However, there was also an intention to form a Mullyon Trading Company based at Mullion, a commercial organisation to help local farmers, retailers and other occupants of the southern part of the Lizard Peninsula who had otherwise to travel on very poor roads to the Ports at Gweek and Porthleven. In doing so they could continue to supply ships anchoring in the Mullion Roads when delayed by bad weather or easterly winds. It also allowed for raw materials such as cement, wood and coal to be delivered.

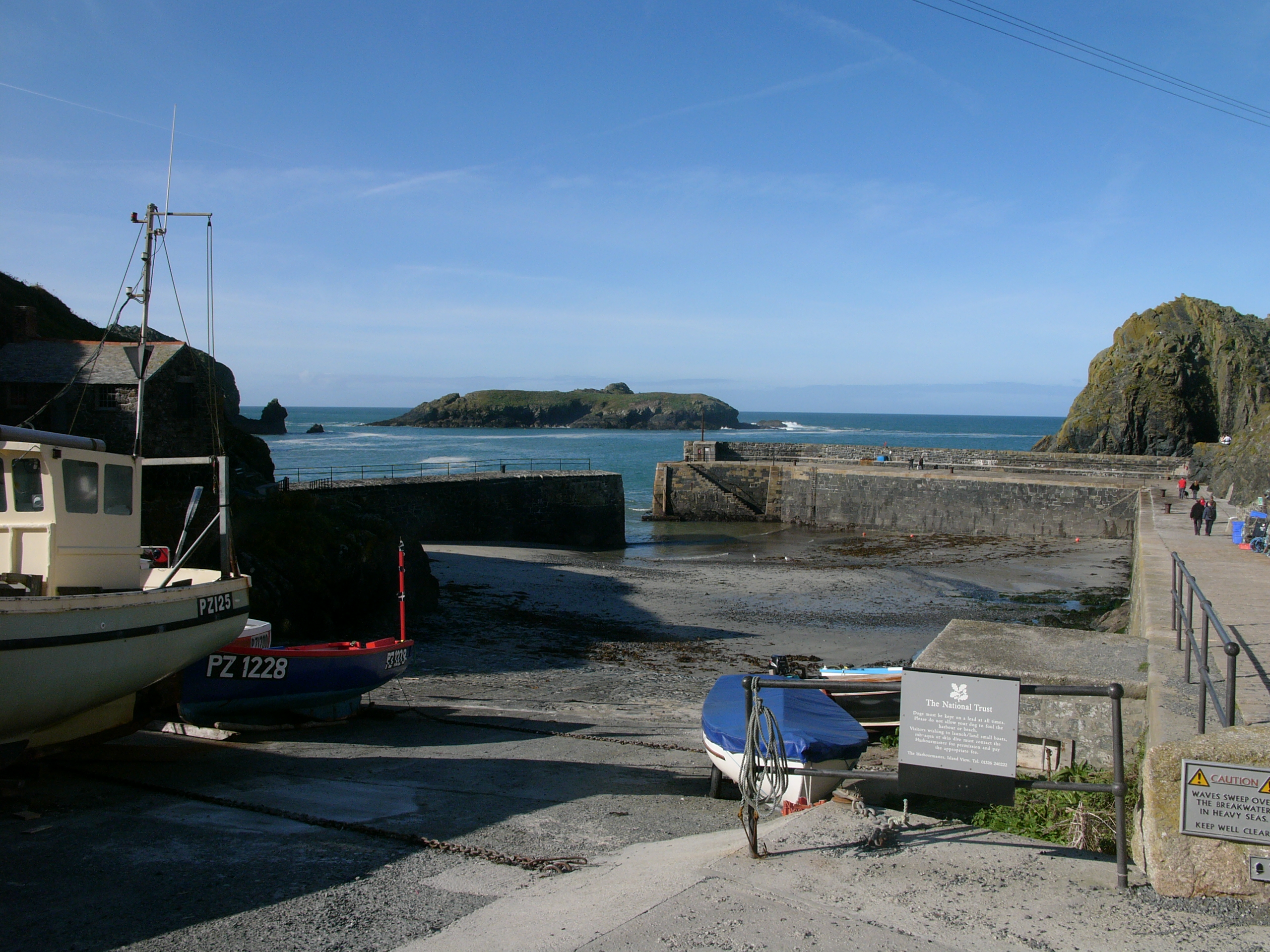
The harbour, looking out to Mullion Island

The harbour was finally completed late in 1897 with initial estimates of cost having risen from a planned input of £10,000 to a total reported overall investment in the harbour by Lord Robartes of £15,000.

== Geography and geology ==
The main rocks on both the northern and southern sides of the harbour are based on hornblende schist, originally thought to be a basalt or a gabbro which has been changed by the heat and pressure, produced by the intrusions of peridotite.

The Hornblende Schist continues south of the South Pier for 50 yards (46 m) where there is a fault boundary with the serpentine. The serpentine continues towards the south west, with a further boundary at the Vro Rock 440 yards (400 m) away. The serpentinite is clearly visible in the high Mullion Cliffs adjacent to what is now a massive scree slope. In 1752 these cliffs were part of a quarry site from which the mineral talc was extracted from soapstone, known then as soaprock. Remains of the mineral are still visible in the form of veins of a white or light-coloured mineral occasionally up to 3 to 4 feet (0.91 to 1.22 m) thick, running at an angle of 45° along the serpentine cliff face.

This mineral was extracted from a number of sites along the west coast of the Lizard peninsula for about 80 years. It was used by the earliest English soft paste porcelain factories to produce thousands of highly decorated pieces (tea and coffee pots, dinner services, tableware, vases etc.) of a very high standard which became fashionable and commonly used by all. For the first time the country's potters could manufacture a product which could withstand boiling water, thus avoiding the previous problems of cracking and breaking, and allowing competition with porcelain imported from China.

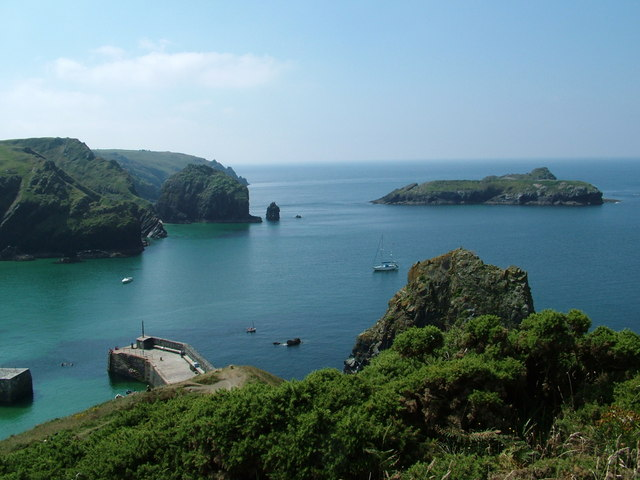
Mullion Cove from the hotel

Given the name of "Soapeyrock", (also referred to locally as Steatite), and identified as such in the 1720s by naturalist Dr John Woodward (1665–1728), and subsequently by Cornish historian William Borlase (1695–1772), it had first been located from coastal cliff sites in the serpentinite of Kynance Cove, 4.3 miles (6.9 km) SSE, as a mineral with potential economic value. The first studies were conducted as early as the 1670s and 1680s. During the 1720s it was used experimentally to make porcelain. Progress in the industry was slow and very costly. The high magnesium content, white colour and very fine powdery texture, which turned soaprock into a very fine clay when wet, helped to make it heat-resistant, and therefore suitable as an ingredient in the production of early ceramics.

Once removed from the cliffs, all the Soaprock was sorted, weighed and transported in wooden casks by sea to the primary early soft paste porcelain factories. In 1748 one of the first factories was set up in Bristol by potter Benjamin Lund who is named as the tenant on the first known Soaprock Lease. In 1751 the newly formed "Worcester Tonquin Factory" set up by Dr John Wall, William Davis, Richard Holdship and 12 other Directors adopted the soft paste porcelain formula and early in 1752 purchased the Lund pottery and acquired the Lease for Gew Graze. In the same year, 1751, Nicholas Crisp and John Sanders opened a porcelain factory in London at Vauxhall. A further factory, also using soaprock was set up in Liverpool in 1756 by Richard Chaffers and Phillip Christian, and at Caughley in Shropshire about 1775 by Thomas Turner. The last well known factory was set up in 1813 in South Wales at Nantgarw with the arrival of William Billingsley, but by this time Bone China was beginning to be developed at other Factories and was becoming the ceramic of choice. Soaprock was still being produced near to Predannack and Mullion and transported from Mullion Cove as late as 1815 from where it continued its journey to porcelain factories such as Worcester where it was still in use.

The first porcelain potters to extract Soaprock from Mullion Cliff were Nicholas Crisp and John Sanders at their Vauxhall factory in London. John Sanders died in 1758 and the factory closed in 1763. Nicholas Crisp then moved to Bovey Tracey where he worked for William Cookworthy on the experimental production of hard paste porcelain.

After Kynance Cove, other quarry sites gradually came into use as more of the mineral was discovered and the demand increased. Other supporting evidence of its first use from that site is to be found on what is recognised as the first very accurately surveyed Map of Cornwall made by Cornishman Thomas Martyn. On the Martyn Map,(which took him 10–15 years to Survey), Kynance Cove is not identified by the name Kynance but merely by the words "The Soapey Rock" indicating that the Soaprock may have been removed from there by early porcelain potters prior to the currently accepted first use date of 1748.

Following Kynance Cove, a better quality and more easily accessible site for Soaprock, was discovered 1 mile (1.6 km) to the north at Gew Graze ("Soapy Cove") in 1748. In 1751 the cliffs of Pentreath Beach, 1 mile (1.6 km) south of Kynance Cove, just north of Caerthillian were identified and they began to be worked. Many of the old quarry sites are still visible. The Mullion Cliff site, which was regarded as the most difficult site to work due to the fragmentation of the serpentine here, was quickly followed by other coastal and inland sites. These included Penruddock Quarry, 0.3 miles (0.48 km) SE of the Vro Rock and the largest of all the soaprock quarries, that of Daroose, situated 1 mile (1.6 km) SE of the Vro. This latter site, extending inland from Teneriffe Farm covering many acres of Predannack Downs was monopolised by the Worcester factory from 1760 when it was leased.

Landowners including Colonel John West of Erisay, Viscount Falmouth, Mary and John Hunt of Lanhydrock, Thomas Fonnereau of Bochym, and Sir Christopher Hawkins insisted on leases being drawn up, and charged the potters for the mineral extraction. Since the 1930s many original handwritten leases, or Soaprock Licences, have been relocated and have provided useful information in the interpretation of this industry. The manufacture of porcelain, in particular by the Bristol (Lund), Worcester, Liverpool and Caughley factories, quickly became an important and evolving industry, and its first use in the production of early English porcelain predated the use of china clay in the commercial manufacture of hard paste porcelain by William Cookworthy in 1768, by well over a quarter of a century.

The serpentine cliffs on the south side of Mullion Cove have a rich history. Serpentine itself forms a high proportion of the bedrock on the Lizard south of Mullion, extending east across the peninsula and south towards the old Lizard Point. In the areas where serpentine is found it has often undergone extensive geological faulting, and with the faulting there are many intrusions or dykes of material such as Kennack Gneiss. These faults and intrusions hold the key to the formation of certain minerals, which were often found together in a variety of concentrations. There were two minerals of economic importance, and both were first sought out in the 1700s. The first was native or virgin copper which, although rare in the UK, is 94% pure and is found in sheets appearing as though molten copper has been poured over the serpentine. It was initially found by accident in the 1720s at Predannack in a rich shallow deposit. Richard Hall, a Mullion man, was riding his horse over the Predannack Downs one day when the horse kicked up what turned out to be a piece of copper ore and after an investigation the mine was started. Although found in very small uneconomic amounts in the Cove, it was economically mined underground in the 1720s, 0.5 miles (0.80 km) away to the SE at what is now Vro Farm, the first operation being Wheal Ghostcroft or Ghost Mine.

The first hardrock mining at Mullion only lasted a few years. A problem was the large amount of underground water which limited the achievable depth and required adits to take it away – which needed finance and labour, but no Mine Leases have currently been located. The mine reopened in the 1740s as Wheal Providence: large amounts of copper ore were produced, but the investors struggled to finance a second, deeper adit. It reopened again between 1807 and 1811 as Wheal Unity or South Wheal Unity and soon began to produce the largest sheets of native copper ever seen in the country. Several of these sheets were exceptional: when sent to Redruth for sale they could make more money sold separately as curios, because of their variety of shapes and rarity. They were catalogued by their shapes and given names such as "Map of England, Figure of a Dolphin, or a Fan". Some of these were privately bought and some exhibited in the famous Chapter Coffee House in Paternoster Row next to St Paul's Cathedral in London in 1810. An economic turndown and lack of funding to develop a second deeper adit led to closure. The last period of mining was between 1845 and 1852, as Wheal Trenance or Trenance Mine. During this period the largest and most important deposits of native copper were discovered. In May 1847 a slab of native copper weighing 371 pounds (168 kg) was raised, supposedly the largest then known. This however was superseded in June 1848 by an even larger piece, which weighed one and a half to two tons and had to be cut into several smaller pieces to be removed. A large piece of this native copper weighing about 1,300 pounds (590 kg), from Trenance Mine at Mullion, was exhibited at the Great Exhibition in London in 1851 and is still on display in the Natural History Museum in London. This piece of Native Copper bears a very close resemblance to part of a much larger piece discovered measuring 7-foot 6 inches in length and about 4-foot wide, and weighing over 8 hundredweight removed from a much larger piece weighing a ton and a half discovered in October 1849 at a depth of 16 fathoms. The second mineral, soaprock, turned out to be more important, through its contribution to the production of early English ceramics, providing a vital impetus to early English porcelain manufacture. Among other products it helped porcelain potters to produce the earliest examples of English tea and coffee cups, plates, dinner and tea services still popular today.

The faults and the prospecting provided the Cove with some of the largest caves on the Lizard. Victorian tourists went there specially at low tide to see and explore them. The main cave is today known as Torchlight Cave. This cave unusually lies on a fault line running south west underneath and into the cliffside from a location which is only visible by rounding a low promontory on the south side of the cove, or directly from the sea. Once inside it is apparent that it is only partially natural. The Victorians carried no torches and had to resort to burning furze (gorse) torches to find their way. Even with these they could hardly see the roof. On the western side is a rock wall which rises at an angle to the roof and looks like a footwall of an old mine. A chamber has been cut at the highest point, over a distance of about 20 feet (6.1 m). To the left is a wall of serpentine which looks like a hanging wall. The floor is about 12 feet (3 to 4 metres) in width and rises slightly to the end, which is 150 feet (46 m) further on. At the top of the footwall is a 3–4-foot (1 metre) wide vein of pale green soaprock, and at the end is what appears to be a man-made chamber guarded by a partially open passage. Behind it is a mass of pale green soaprock narrowing to a dead end. This is undoubtedly a site of underground soaprock mining, recorded in 18th century Soaprock Leases, but it was also used to store contraband such as brandy, commonly brought over from France by local smugglers.

Anecdotally, for many years it was suggested that this large cave and smaller Drifts, (man-made tunnels connected to mining) visible from the harbour, were in fact underground Adits taking water away from the Copper Mine on higher ground, but these are only short man-made interventions into the cliff side and totally unconnected. The two documented and recorded Copper Mine adits fed northwards from the mine below a shallow valley, into the river course directly below the Listed Mill on Mullion Mill Farm. From there the water flows into the Cove some 400 yards (370 m) away. With Torchlight Cave, sometimes referred to in the 19th century as the "Great Cave", being such an important site for visiting Victorian tourists, the fact that it is now so much more difficult to reach on foot- only for short periods during the lowest tides- it is therefore a strong indicator of a rising sea level, something which is so important for the future of the Mullion Harbour.

== Fishing and smuggling ==
A fishing industry has been based in Mullion Cove for hundreds of years. There is reference to fishing boats on the Lizard Peninsula as early as the 1600s, with domestic state papers from the time of Charles I recording details of fishing boats and their crews often being captured by North African Barbary and Turkish pirates. A record of the Calendar of State Papers for 1636–1637 shows that "At St. Keverne and Helford Creek seven more fisher boats were taken by the Turks... three were fisher boats belonging to St. Keverne, three others of Helston, and one more of Mollan (Mullion) and about 50 men in them".

Smuggling was commonplace among Lizard fishermen. For the locals, a barrel of brandy quietly ordered and paid for before a smugglers' boat trip to France was a welcome sight. To fishermen or other parties engaged in this illicit trade the avoidance of excise duty meant another few shillings in their pocket and just reward for foiling the excise men and customs.

In April 1786 one prolific smuggler, Thomas Welland, in his armed lugger "Happy go Lucky", was killed in a gun battle near Mullion Island by men of the Revenue cutters Hawk and Lark. The rest of the crew were captured, and on board were found many illegal fighting cocks. A much misquoted story of Mullion smugglers is recorded here. On 19 June 1801 in Mullion Cove the Revenue gunship Hecate ran ashore and captured a lugger loaded with smuggled spirits, owned in part by a man from Mullion called William Richards. A short time later the smugglers ran to the village and obtained the assistance of a number of local men. They then broke into and raided the militia armoury at Trenance, stealing a number of muskets and ammunition. These they took to the Cove. Under cover of the rocks on the cliff, they began firing at the Revenue men to retake their boat and cargo, hoping to drive them away. It was reported that they continued firing for a considerable time, until the Revenue men were forced to quit the lugger and take to their boat to save their lives. Richards was identified, and went into hiding. This was no minor skirmish. The Admiralty offered a £100 reward to anyone offering information leading to the apprehension and conviction of anyone involved, including William Richards (also known as "Billy the Payow") with a description: "... about 52 years of age, 5' 7", stoutly made dark hair straight and short, dark complexion, dark grey eyes, reddish eyelashes and eyebrows and a full red beard, remarkably thick and large, discoloured teeth and voice sharp and shrill". A King's Pardon was offered to "... any one of them — except Richards alias Payow — who shall discover his or their accomplices therein, so that any one of them may be apprehended and convicted of the malicious and atrocious act. Signed Pelham." Nothing was reported of William Richards; however a man of the same name was subsequently recorded along with other Mullion men in the deeds of bravery at the shipwreck of the Anson at Loe Bar in December 1807. HMS Anson, Captain Lydiard, was a 64 gun ship of the line. She was returning from the Bay of Biscay in a WSW gale. She made land near Mullion Island intending to stand off to sea but was unable to tack and became embayed. Her anchors failed to save her and she was washed north onto Loe Bar resulting in dreadful loss of life. Although Loe Bar is several miles north of Mullion the wreck of the naval ship Anson was a notable one. Several men from Mullion, using a coastal road then in existence from Poldhu through Gunwalloe to Porthleven were involved in the rescue of the crew. One such man was William Foxwell, a Mullion Preacher who was the first in a group to gain access to the ship and in the process helped to save many lives for which he was given an award. He was a man who became noted for providing help, clothing and food to many shipwrecked sailors along this coast.

Smuggling continued here, with many further incidents being recorded, before gradually declining later in the 19th century. In 1897 two of the oldest Mullion smugglers, Henry "Bo Bo" George, then 78 years of age, and Dionysius or "Dio" Williams, then 93, disclosed some of their tales and their methods of "free trading" in a magazine interview. In the 1800s a four-gallon (18 litres) tub of brandy bought in France for £1 sold for £4 on return to Mullion, giving a handsome profit. Henry George, a well known local fisherman who died in 1898, was known as "The King of the Smugglers", and his father Richard was commonly known as "Old Dick". With the advent of tourism and hotels, Henry could often be found in the Cove relating stories to the visitors, when "as a boy he would roll up kegs of brandy from the beach into the caves and afterwards go home with a "scrowl" pilchard for his supper" and about his father who it seems made 21 runs to France for brandy. It seems that every trip to France was planned with military precision, and there were always two alternative landing points for the smuggled goods to take into account changes in wind direction – and of course loose talk in the vicinity of the Revenue men. Where the smugglers were concerned in their dealings with the Preventative Men, every manoeuvre to outwit them was regarded as lawful and bloodshed was to be avoided. Both sides were habitually armed, but there was never any loss of life in the neighbourhood. Occasionally the Preventative Men would successfully recover tubs or bottles of brandy, but there were hiding places in almost every house in the locality. There was a cave in the cliff with two hollowed out chambers above the level of the tide, the location of which neither men would divulge – was this the cave often visited by tourists and called Torchlight Cave?

Along with a sustainable approach to crab and lobster fishing, pilchard fishing was part of the lifeblood of many Cornish communities, and along with work on local farms provided an income and food source for families in and around Mullion and elsewhere on the Lizard Peninsula. Part of the wages paid to fishermen came in the form of fish. Another local industry, the manufacture of fishing pots from locally grown Withies or willow strands, highlighted part of the sustainability of the fishing industry. Each fisherman made his own pots every year, both in the cove and in small buildings in the village before the season began. That skill is now limited to a few fishermen only.

The land in Mullion Cove was controlled by the owners of Lanhydrock House, and any development required their authority. In 1798 the then landowner George Hunt died unmarried, and left the property to his niece, Anna Marie Hunt, who married Charles Agar in 1804. He died in 1811 and she ran Lanhydrock until 1829 when her son Thomas took over. He then took the additional name of Robartes, becoming Baron Robartes of Lanhydrock and Truro in 1869.

In 1793 the fishermen in Mullion Cove applied to Lanhydrock for permission to develop the cove as an inshore seine fishery, and by 1805 much of the pilchard catch was taken by boat to Penzance and Newlyn to be cured. In 1806 a total of 7000 hogsheads of pilchards were recorded taken from Mullion. It is likely that by this time several fish cellars had been built in Cove, putting the fishing on an economic footing. At that time, the fishing had as much connection with Predannack as it did with Mullion, and it was hoped that the new industry would encourage occupation and building at Predannack. Even the roads at that time led to and from Predannack.

The idea of building sheltered accommodation for Huers in the Mounts Bay Fishery did not come about until about 1848 with Huers Huts or shelters first being constructed between Mousehole and Newlyn. Perhaps this was also the time when the "Huers Hut" was built on the headland at Henscath, directly in front of what later became the site of the Mullion Cove Hotel, which was built in 1898. Here the important Huers Hut was a solid building facing west to the sea, right on the edge of the cliff, and constructed in stone in the shape of a small boat. The fixed roof was that of an old upturned boat making it clearly visible from the sea below. The Huers view commanded the whole of the Mullion seine fishery. The site remains, but the hut has gone. The fishing companies in the Cove elected one, or as many as three, Huers per season for the vital job of directing and guiding the boats and their oarsmen listening and watching below in the oak seine boats to the best positions to cast their nets. The Huer worked from sunrise to sunset, six days a week, but not on Sunday. Many catches of pilchards would be released and lost if caught late on a Saturday and they could not be landed before dark.

In 1811 pilchards from Mullion were being sold at Penzance at one shilling for 120 (or ten-a-penny). In the early 1800s fish were plentiful and the pilchard fishing took place in the summer and autumn months. In 1833 the season was considered over by October. The markets for Cornish pilchards in the 19th century were in the Mediterranean, with Italy the main buyer. From the Mounts Bay fishing ports of Newlyn and Penzance the pilchards in their wooden casks would be sold in Genoa, Leghorn, Civitavecchia, Naples, Ancona, Venice, and Trieste, and to a lesser extent in Malta. Cornwall was not a county rich in trees and forests, and wood was needed for mining and shipbuilding. From Elizabethan times there was a rule that the ships going to Italy were to bring back wood to replace that used to cask the pilchards. By 1850 there were fewer fish, and the summer pilchard season declined: the boats went out for shoals much later in the year. After 1850 fewer fish were caught. In 1859, the shoals failed to appear at all, and in 1870 a shoal of pilchards was caught at Mullion on Christmas Day although in some seasons there were record catches, as in 1871. By 1877 the fishing was in decline and a number of boats, nets and gear were put up for sale. However catches varied and there were still some good years.

Most of the major fishing companies were based at Newlyn, with boats at Mullion. They were part of the Mounts Bay fishing industry. The names have now long disappeared, but some are still remembered: Bolitho, Leah, William Thomas, the Union and Gull boats employed by Trehair, "Mullion Friends", Coulson and Company, the "United Seining Company", "The Happy Return" employed by Edward Batten, Mullion "Covers", Mullion "Rovers", the "Union". The Seine Boats were heavy oak craft 30 to 40 feet (9.1 to 12.2 m) long. They weighed up to 30 tons, and were rowed by six crewmen. In addition the crew included two Net Shooters and a bowman. The boats were directed to the pilchard shoals by the Huer and enclosed by circling them with the nets. At Mullion each boat had an "area of ground" whereby the crew had to cast their nets and complete the enclosure of the shoal or part of the shoal as they drifted. These areas or "Stems" as they were called were marked out on land by large posts in the ground on the cliffside and there was a responsibility to complete the enclosure between the two designated markers before retiring and allowing the next boat to come in and cast their net. This was to prevent arguments. The Net Shooters had the extra responsibility of paying out the nets in an accurate manner without tangling and at the direction of the Master Seiner. The bowman provided additional assistance. A second boat, called the "Volyer" or "Follower", carried the "Tuck Net" which was used to remove the fish from the seine net. The "Tuck Net" was the equivalent of a large bag net which made it possible to transfer smaller quantities of fish at a time from the Seine Net to waiting boats before transfer ashore. A smaller boat, called the "Lurker" or "Cock Boat", contained the Master Seiner. The fine mesh Seine Nets, cleaned or barked after each use weighed up to 3 tons each and could be 1200 feet (360 m) long and 60–70 feet (about 20 metres) deep. They were then brought ashore, where they were "baulked" with salt in fish cellars and later casked and transported abroad by the merchants across the Mounts Bay.

Although the Seine Boats were kept in the water for long periods during the Pilchard Season they were hauled out to a position above high water by a strong Winch when bad weather or storms approached. This would take place day or night. A capstan similar to that visible today in Mullion Cove was used but in the 19th century was surrounded by a strong wooden framework to assist winching. A capstan winch which has a similar but smaller framework and used for the same purpose, constructed by local miners from Geevor, is still in place today at the little cornish fishing cove of Penberth in the Parish of St. Buryan and can be visited there on foot from Porthcurno.

The fishermen's pay varied between the fishing areas. The normal practice was that fishing companies set up outside the Cove got one third share of the revenue and the suppliers of the boats and gear got another third share. The fishermen and huers would also get a third share. At Mullion, in the mid to late 1800s there was a different arrangement involving the huers, fishermen, and owners. The Huer would receive 17 shillings (£0.85) per week and every 20th dozen of fish. The net shooters would receive 10/6d (£0.525) per week and the Boat Crew 9/- (£0.45) per week. They would also receive one quarter of the total catch between them. Of this quarter catch the Net Shooters and the Masters of the "Cock" Boats and the Bowman would receive a share and a half and a share and a quarter each. The remainder of the crew received a share each. In addition to this arrangement the Net Shooters, Masters of the Cock Boats and Bowman received 2d (£0.00833) and 1d (£0.00417) respectively on every hogshead of the owner's share of the fish. This was a complicated arrangement, but it was considered to be fair.

Several centuries ago it was often a race to keep the lobsters and crabs fresh for market. During the 19th century a ketch from the Isles of Scilly or Lundy often called into the cove to collect locally caught lobster and crab, which was taken to Southampton. The delivery boats had a large wooden container built into the bottom of the boat which was filled with sea water. Prices varied, but in the mid to late 1800s Mullion lobsters would sell for 14/- per dozen (£0.0583 each); £1/6/0 per dozen (£0.108 each) for crabs and crawfish, and 2 shillings and six pence a dozen (£0.0208 each) for she-crabs. Matters were not always straightforward. Storms blighted the fishing boats at all times of the year. In July 1839 a storm almost totally wrecked the Mullion pilchard fishing fleet at a vital stage in the season. Six seine boats were sunk and almost all the nets and gear lost. This was a major loss. The crabbers were also affected along the Lizard Coast with loss of gear, crab pots, store pots and catch. On 31 March 1858 Dionysius Williams of Mullion sent his catch via Steamer from Hayle to Bristol and then by Rail to London. These were believed to be the first crabs and Lobsters to be sent to London that year and included 140 Lobsters, 400 Crabs and a few Crawfish. In September 1858 he sailed his catch from Falmouth to Plymouth in his boat "Exhibition" with £30-£40 of crabs and Lobsters on board. Near Fowey his boat started to leak and he was forced to make for the harbour, but before he could reach it the boat sank and they had to take to the ship's boat and be towed ashore. With the mast still sticking out of the water and not wishing to lose his boat, nor for that matter his catch of Lobster and Crab the intrepid fisherman entertained the thought that if better weather was close by the boat might be raised and the catch saved. Dionysius Williams fisherman, carpenter and smuggler died at the age of 94, having conducted a building business in the parish for over 60 years. Towards the end of his life he was a respected member of Mullion Parish being also churchwarden and choirmaster. He was also undertaker for the funeral of the Mullion Historian and Vicar Edmund George Harvey who died in 1884. Economic conditions, the influence of the War, fishing by French and other foreign boats were to have a great effect on the development of fishing in Cornwall. By 1919 low prices in London were driving the Lobster and Crab Fishermen out of business. At the London Fish Market Lobster was 3 shillings (£0.15 pence) per pound and Crabs 1 shilling and sixpence (£0.075 pence) per pound. By way of example 100 Cornish Lobsters and 2-300 Cornish Crabs were sent to market and made under £6 the lot.

In 1877 two brothers from Beverley,(Boston) New England, William Andrews and Asa Walter Andrews, apparently looking for an adventure, came to a surprising decision that despite having little sailing experience they wanted to build a boat and sail the Atlantic from west to east. Their intention was to attend the Great Exhibition in Paris, France the following year. By 1878 they had built for them in a Massachusetts Boatyard a Lap Streak Dory with a keel of only 15-foot and an overall length of 19-foot. The wood was cedar and the hull was only a half an inch in thickness. They named the boat the Nautilus, provisioned her limited space and set sail from City Point on 7 June. After some initial damage was caused in a storm they were obliged to recommence their journey from Boston on 14 June 1878. On the way across the Atlantic they kept a Log of this remarkable journey which was eventually published. They witnessed and experienced storms, high winds, pods of whales, porpoises and dolphin, sea birds, flying fish, sunfish and sea serpents among their contacts and came into direct communication with the crossings made by hundreds of other boats and ships from many countries making the journey under sail and steam. By Sunday 28 July they sighted Bishops Rock Lighthouse. By 31 July they tried to make the Lizard but were unable to round the Point due to easterly winds and strong currents. As a result, they were forced to sail up the west coast of the Lizard Peninsula until they spotted a sandy beach about 40-foot in length with a huge rock at its entrance. They wrote in their Log that " It was Mullion Cove, Coastguard and Life Saving Station. How fortunate we are safe". Here they anchored for the first time. They ate and were then joined by a Falmouth Pilot Cutter "Grand Turk" crewed by Captain George Cox and Jacob Harris after which Walter Andrews went ashore for fresh water. In a short time their arrival was known not just at Mullion or on the Lizard. The story was telegraphed around the world for it was the fastest crossing ever of the Atlantic by a small boat. The crowds flocked to see them and the newspapermen came to interview them. Bad weather continued so they decided to stay and became familiar with the local Coastguardman Parland Griffiths, the Vicar Rev. E. G. Harvey and took meals at the "Old Inn" where they met Mary Mundy, local Licensee and well known resident of Mullion Village. They sampled Pasties and rested until the weather changed. They wrote in their Log that "... this was the only event that has happened here outside shipwrecks for many years". On their leaving the Cove on a rainy day there was no one there to wish them good luck. The record journey across the Atlantic had taken them 45 days until their first landfall at Mullion Cove. They finally left Mullion on Monday 5 August 1878 and continued their journey to Havre, France, attending the Exhibition.

The fishermen of Mullion Cove lived and worked alongside many hundreds of other fishermen and fishing families and businesses in the Mounts Bay. In 1850 there were three types of fishing in the Mounts Bay- Drift Net, Seine Fishing in addition to the "Hookers" who used many hooks and a Long Line trailed from the boat. Drift Fishing, the most common and widespread took place in all seasons as well as at night time when boats from Newlyn, Mousehole, Porthleven and a small number from the smaller fisheries including Mullion would all run out long nets from their boats buoyed by a series of hand made cork buoys in search of Pilchards, Herring and Mackerel. The Hook and Line Boats were run by smaller concerns, older fishermen and Pilots who need to stay closer to shore. They would take the likes of Ling, Cod, Pollock and any fish from the surface down to the seabed. In 1850 there were about 200 Boats in the Mounts Bay, 180 of which were Drift Boats The Mounts Bay at night was described as a "City of Twinkling Lights" each boat distinguished by having one oil, candle lamp or paraffin lamp. They were joined by hundreds of gulls eager to be fed. Often the gulls would roost on the cliffs, flying out later in the night to follow the boats and to sit and wait for their fish supper. The larger Companies involved included the likes of Trehair and Bolitho, which also owned some boats at Mullion. The catch was processed over at Newlyn. They frequently met and discussed every aspect of their livlihoods with each other. Everything which happened in the Bay affected each of the fishermen and their families.Just as coasting and long distance sailing ships were affected by storms and bad weather, so were the fishing boats. There were many tragic accidents. On 7 October 1880 a storm of totally unexpected proportions ravaged the Mounts Bay from the SSE. Fishing boats ran for safer moorings at Mousehole, Newlyn and Penzance. For once the barometer had not foretold the severity of the storm, wind and waves. One Mousehole fishing boat, the Jane, skippered by JT Wallis was seen to run past the Lizard towards Penzance. About 100 yards from Penzance Lighthouse she was washed over by a huge wave and broke up. The Captain and crew were all drowned. In total 30 fishing boats were lost, even as far east as Prussia Cove. The storm was a personal and financial disaster affecting the families of the lost crew and all the fishing communities around the Bay. It was one of the worst disasters ever recorded here. Harbours of Refuge were still under discussion but not further developed. This disaster and other similar incidents were however remembered and were in part responsible for the later development of a harbour at Mullion Cove. Like many fishing communities, Mullion held an annual regatta in the Cove, attended by hundreds of both locals and visitors. Spectators lined the harbour and cliffs to watch it. There were sailing and rowing races, gig and punt races, swimming, lifesaving, obstacle races, tug of war in boats and the "greasy pole" still in use at some venues today. The regattas were popular in the 1890s, and were always very competitive. But in the 1894 regatta a local man, drowned when his boat Daisy sank in an accident. The names of the participants regularly appeared in local Cornish Newspapers with their boats, including Morning Star, Maude, Secret, Surprise, Kate, Gleaner, Boy Jim, Teazer, Janie, Britannia, Ajax and Morning Girl. Even after the building of the harbour it could not be said that the fishing during the latter stages of the 19th Century had been a huge success. In fact at the end of 1898 fishing in the Mounts Bay was described with the words "Well !. It can surely never be worse than this". But it did. During the night of Thursday 7 April 1899 Newlyn was on the receiving end of a disaster which spread right across the Mounts Bay. A deep depression moving NE changed direction and created NW gales described as hurricane force. In the early hours increasing gale-force winds drove 14 boats of the fishing fleet from a mooring at Newlyn causing some to drift uncontrollably towards the eastern side of the Bay and some towards the English Channel. Fishing boats were seen drifting across the bay at speed. Some were identifiable and some actually had crew on board. One man called William Treneer who was 71 years of age was asleep on board his boat Alpha when it had been washed away in the early hours. His boat was later seen well out to sea from Prussia Cove and watchers hoped that it was far enough out to round the Lizard. Boats began to come ashore and were wrecked. Five boats were seen drifting across the bay and went ashore at Gunwalloe Church Cove, and at Polurrian. The Mullion Lifeboat was seen to try and follow one boat towards the Lizard. The Porthleven Rocket Apparatus was sent to Mullion. One boat with fisherman Albert Wallis (55 years) aboard let out three anchors one after the other but they would not hold. He was eventually rescued at Porthleven with his boat the Florence lying on her side. Sadly there was no news of Mr. William Treneer (71 years) on the Alpha. One of the casualties at Gunwalloe Church Cove was the Excel which was smashed to pieces. At Polurrian the same thing happened to the Onward. Two boats one numbered 134, another the Progress were seen heading for the Lizard and had taken in water. Their fate was not clear. Others had foundered before they got to Porthleven- Cygnet, Dew drop, Come-on and Dart. The Valetta was wrecked at Predannack Point. Almost no fishing gear was saved. Had the Sir Wilfred Lawson drifted 200 yards further south all would have been lost but the on board crew and gear were saved. Three had gone ashore at the Stag Rocks on the Lizard, three at Predannack Cliffs, one at Polurrian and one at Poldhu. A search continued. The Bay was found to be full of fishing nets and gear and the eastern coast was full of wreckage. Miraculously as information came in to Newlyn it was found that the Alpha had been spotted swirling around the end of the Lizard Peninsula in the gale- with the sole occupant, the 71-year-old Mr Treneer at the Tiller, but after this report nothing was known. Eventually other boats were found and at least, despite great financial loss there was good news. The Progress was eventually towed in to Plymouth and information was received that the Alpha had been towed in to Brixham. A few days later the incident was to end on a slightly better note for one family. As the gale subsided a remarkable telegram was received at Newlyn, sent from Gravesend to a Mr Joe Treneer of Church Lane Newlyn. It read as follows " All well!- meet me at the Station-Father. It was later reported that the old fisherman had managed to navigate the Bay on the rudder passing close to Cudden Point, Trewavas Head, and then close to Mullion Island. He went close to the Rill and was able to miss the Stag Rocks at the Lizard. He managed to make for the Manacles before drifting out to sea and was eventually picked up by a Hungarian Steamer 48 miles SSW of Plymouth. He was kept warm and fed well all the way to London, the Captain being reluctant to let him off the ship before he was fully recovered. He subsequently took the overnight train to Penzance arriving five days after his journey began.

=== 20th century ===
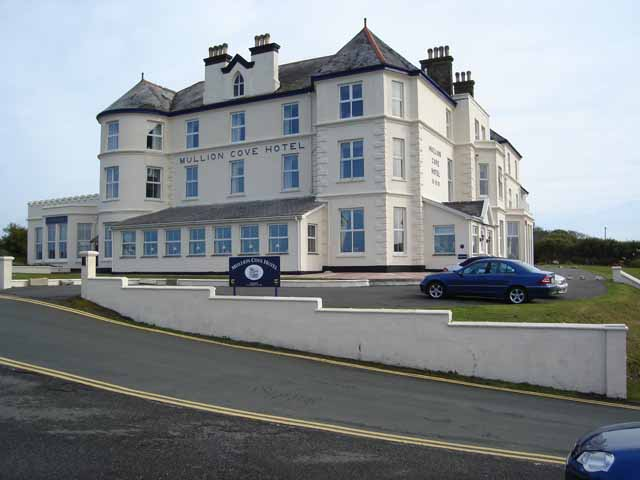
The Mullion Cove Hotel

Tourism has been important to Mullion Cove since the late 19th century. Rail links to Helston and improving road links to the Lizard were to bring thousands of tourists flocking to the newly built hotels on the Peninsula including the three large hotels at Mullion: the Polurrian House Hotel (1889), the Mullion Cove Hotel(1898) and the Poldhu Cove Hotel (1899). Londoners in particular were regular visitors. Artists could often be seen with their paints and easels set up on the cliffs or in the Cove at low tide. Annually the Regattas continued and there were boat trips around the Island. Swimmers would often swim to the Island and back for exercise and visitors spent time on the Island and nearby beaches such as Sandy Vro. In 1905 a series of summer storms in May and August destroyed boats and large quantities of fishing gear, which was expensive to replace. By the end of August there were doubts whether the fishing could continue. It took a concerted effort from a number of famous Edwardian actors (Seymour Hicks), actresses (Ellaline Terriss), show business heroes and visiting authors staying at the three main Mullion hotels to promote the Regatta, produce a programme of events and help raise enough money to allow the fishermen to continue.

Many Victorian and Edwardian visitors were occasionally treated to their first and last glimpses of a life as a Cornish pilchard seine fisherman. In September 1908, following a long quiet spell, there was a call of "Hevva" from the huer. The "Covers" quickly launched two boats with one net shot below the Polurrian Hotel but the net could not be closed and the fish escaped. A second net was shot but the shoal escaped. Another "Covers" boat was launched and a net was shot off Mullion Island, this time successfully enclosing part of the shoal at the north end of the Island enclosing about 100 Hogsheads of fish. It was a talking point for many a visitor at the Mullion Cove Hotel and from those watching from the cliffs. It was not unknown for village cricket matches, or harvesting, to be interrupted by a call of "Hevva": all the fishermen ran to launch the boats. For several hundred years the Cornish Pilchard Fishing was sustained by one large Italian market. In the early 1800s Pilchards from some locations were even sent to the W. Indies, and in the 1870s they were sold in the fish markets of New York as Sardines. In 1909 the Italian market was hit by a large earthquake in Messina. In Britain there was no taste for Pilchards and even with a fast train service to London the salted pilchards were never popular. In London they were almost unheard of. After hundreds of years the market was changing. There was an intervention by the 1914–1918 Great War which also saw the introduction of more efficient engines for fishing boats.

The demise of the pilchard was set and by the early 1920s the seine boats had begun to disappear, never to return. In 1923 Italy lifted the Tariff on all salt fish except Pilchards making prices unfavourable. The pilchard market was now competing with salt cod, herring and other fish. In the late 1920s, in Italy, Mussolini was of the opinion that the Pilchard merchants were charging more than they should. Cornish Pilchard fishermen had no one to fish for. In 1928 catches of mixed Mackerel and Pilchards, between 30,000 and 60,000 were brought into Newlyn, but the market was already glutted. The fish had to be dumped into the Mounts Bay. By 1935 Mussolini would not spend Italian money abroad. Imports of pilchards from the UK, including those from Cornish curers were banned. By 1939 Britain was importing millions of canned pilchards from markets in California and Japan. The countries of the British Empire were also importing them in large quantities, but not from Cornwall. No one wanted Cornish pilchards. In the 1920s and 1930s there were only apparently only 2 or 3 Mullion boats involved with the Mount's Bay drift and net fishery. Around 1938 the few larger fishing boats at Mullion were sold in favour of smaller, less costly boats. Fishing was not easy and making a good living was becoming more difficult. The start of World War II later in 1939 ended pilchard fishing. Markets and fishermen never really recovered.

The decline and ultimate loss of the pilchard industry from the early years of the 20th century heralded a new beginning for motorised fishing boats. They could travel farther afield and transport a larger, fresher catch to market more speedily. Motorised fishing boats began to appear in the Cove and some were very successful. However, it also meant that fishing boats from France, Belgium and other European countries were also able to fish on both sides of the English Channel. There were many times when French fishermen, held up in the Mount's Bay used what is now the Grade II Listed Net Loft in Mullion Harbour as a shelter from storms and adverse weather. In the late 1920s ownership of the harbour passed from Lord Clifden to the Meyer Family but it is now understood that there was an unheralded return to the storms and the gales which affected the Cove in the 1800s. 1929 was a good summer with below average rainfall. Photographs of the time show no damage to the harbour. In November and December 1929 there were three huge Atlantic storms recorded. These caused untold damage to the south Cornwall coast. In the November storm torrential rain was accompanied by gales for several days causing huge seas to build, and massive waves rising high up the sides of St. Michaels Mount were reported. Between 1 November and 25 November 1929 a total of over 10 inches of rain was recorded in Cornwall. Damage was reported to sea walls harbours and promenades throughout the Mounts Bay area. After a storm in the first week of December 1929 it was reported that winds had been recorded at 90 mph at Falmouth. In fact it was described as no less than a hurricane. At Porthleven, after a second December storm there was damage reported to the harbour, houses and most of the public buildings there, including the Institute. The gales and storms continued. It is therefore no wonder then that the little harbour of Mullion Cove should also have been damaged and dateable photographs from the early 1930s show a gradually disintegrating monument. They show that the end of the south pier was gradually receding, with the stone lying on the harbour floor. In Mullion Cove, and elsewhere in Cornwall many fishermen were spending several months fishing away from home catching Herring and Mackerel. Some local fishermen went on to join the Merchant Navy but the smaller crab and lobster industry still flourished. Local fishermen were finding it increasingly difficult to access the harbour. The period between 1939 and 1947 was to have more than a passing influence on the future of life in Mullion Cove.

During World War II an anti-tank wall measuring 5 ft (1.5 m) high and 4 ft (1.2 m) wide and consisting of concrete blocks with a solid infill of concrete. Approximately 50% of the original wall still exists. Additional defences included barb wire along the harbour walls and cliffs. Certainly the focus of attention in Mullion Cove for the last 70 years has been damage caused to Mullion Harbour. During the Second World War the owners of the harbour were engaged away from home, their main business connected to the repair of bomb damaged UK cities. With many of the fishermen away at war skilled stonemasons and other labour were also in short supply. Maintenance of the harbour proved difficult. This was also the case for other harbours and stone structures in Cornwall. By 1944 the small number of fishermen who remained were struggling yet again to make a living as the end of the south pier had begun to collapse into the harbour. Fishermen attempting to earn a living were refusing to pay their harbour dues. There were discussions about the problem at the Cornwall Sea Fisheries Committee meeting in March 1944 and there were attempts to involve the District Council. It was noted that if there was a desire to repair the harbour then a certificate would be required from the Ministry to the effect that it was worthwhile. In 1945 ownership of the harbour, Island and nearby coastal cliffs was handed over to the National Trust. The National Trust initially thought that repair was economically unjustifiable but on aesthetic grounds they felt duty bound to do so. In 1947 the west pier had become undermined and in danger of falling and the Trust launched an appeal for £2000 to safeguard the harbour. This began the post-war phase of rebuilding. Post War Development Plans provided for coastal communities to be able to live without damage to their amenities. A brief summary of repairs reveals that in 1954 the toe of the southern pier began to fall away and owing to a shortage of funds at that time the Trust were unable to rebuild it. Subsequently, it was cut off at an angle and capped with concrete. Many local people remember this phase of rebuilding and seemed pleased with the result. In 1978 cracks appeared at the end of the pier and between December 1978 and February 1979 the vertical seaward end was rebuilt with serpentine and granite so that it looked as it did when originally built. Further storm damage continued to occur and additional reconstruction was undertaken. In the 1990s the raised concrete walkway leading to the south pier was rebuilt and rock armour added to the internal corner. The west pier also suffered considerable damage to the external wall and the parapet required expenditure all costing several hundred thousand pounds. By 2003 the National Trust was considering the future prospect of the two Listed Harbour Piers. An independent report (Halcrow Report) was commissioned in 2004 and reported in 2006. The prospects for the next 100 years did not look good. It looked at the viability of the structure, given the very grim prospect that climate change, a rapidly rising sea level and increasing costs might lead to the Cove losing the Piers at an unspecified date in the future. They considered their options and the words "Managed Retreat" became a commonly used but unpopular phrase. There was an increase in reporting and the following comment was noted. "The National Trust is already preparing for the loss of Mullion Harbour" After noting details of the high cost of these non-listed building repairs costing £150,000 in 2006 and the plan to inspect the site every year, plus spend £5000 on repairs the report went on to say "... When this programme becomes unsustainable the Trust will move to managed retreat, removing the Breakwaters, or allowing them to collapse, whilst trying to consolidate the inner walls. Eventually the harbour will revert back to its original state as a cove on a storm lashed coast."

In 2008, a document ("Shifting Shores – Living with a changing coastline") produced by the National Trust highlighted that the increase in coastal erosion could affect 279 km (173miles) of the Trusts coastline in the south west and tidal flooding could affect 852 hectares (2105 acres). It also highlighted their Management Policy which was "working with natural processes wherever possible", and allowing the coast to realign itself when sea defences have to be removed. When assessing different management options a number of social, economic and environmental factors must be considered. In 2011 there was further storm damage to both piers requiring Listed Building Planning permission to introduce concrete to the structure. To the local observer viewing the harbour every day it seemed that this repair was never going to be completed. To others it seemed that the addition of concrete might reduce the heritage value of the Victorian structure. Both the piers at Mullion Harbour were severely damaged during a series of winter storms in 2013–14. These storms produced winds and high seas with waves not seen on the coast before in the lifetime of those living in Cornwall. They badly affected the west coast of the Lizard Peninsula resulting in severe and costly damage at Mullion, Porthleven and elsewhere. Environmental changes to the coastline were widely reported with the removal of as much as 2 metres (6 feet) of sand from some beaches exposing bare rock. As well as causing damage in Cornwall, Devon, and Somerset other parts of southern England, South Wales and Ireland were affected. Locally there were many reports of damage to properties bordering the coast caused by strong winds and incursions from high spring tides. The state of the sea often attracted people to become "coast watchers" and there were many who wanted to record these events. Some attempts however were regarded as being potentially dangerous to those involved. In January 2014 the Daily Mirror ran a front-page story featuring photographs of a man holding a young child up to peek over the harbour wall during a storm and then being engulfed by waves. The photographs were also featured in other national newspapers including the Daily Express and The Times.

Repairs were conducted on behalf of the National Trust in two phases. Firstly in May 2014 lengthy "like for like" work to recover and replace lost granite setts and granite quoins was undertaken. These included heavy granite quoins weighing 2–3 tons along with approximately 6000 setts which had been washed from the walkway into the harbour by huge waves. Damage was also caused to the parapet. The second set of repairs to the south pier followed later the same year. These began in the early Autumn of 2014 and continued until Easter 2015. These were "Listed Building Repairs" and included removal and replacement of the outer stone courses and part of the central Victorian concrete core. Replacement included the use of large quantities of modern marine concrete in the hope that it would stabilise and provide protection from further storm damage. In 2016 the National Trust reported that since 1945 it has spent more than £2 million repairing the breakwaters (piers)and over the last 20 years an average of £1500 per week has been spent as winter storms have become more frequent and violent. It also reports that the harbour receives 80,000 visitors per year. (This number however cannot be verified)

== Lifeboat station ==
As early as 1811 there were suggestions that there should be a lifeboat at Porthleven and Mullion Cove. By the late 1850s, after an increasing number of shipwrecks and severe storms in which lives were lost, villagers and Lloyd's of London realised that a lifeboat was needed on the west coast of the Lizard Peninsula. In 1859 the RNLI also agreed, but despite Lord Robartes agreeing to help fund it, progress towards obtaining one was slow. The nearest lifeboats at that time were at Porthleven and Lizard Point. In a series of severe storms from January to April 1867, there were 16 shipwrecks in the Port of Penzance area. Three schooners, Cherub, Ebbw Vale and Margaret, were wrecked off the cliffs between Mullion and Poldhu in one storm on 5 January, with four lives lost. In the same storm there were five wrecks at Marazion. The villagers in Mullion held a public meeting chaired by the local vicar, Rev. Edmund George Harvey, calling for a lifeboat to be stationed at Mullion Cove. The RNLI responded and funds were raised by Lord Robartes, local Methodists, the RNLI and other generous contributors. Shortly afterwards, in March 1867, a barque, the Dutch Eastindiaman Jonkheer Meester van de Wall van Putterschoek, was wrecked in Mullion Parish, off the Men-y-Grib rocks south of Poldhu with the loss of 24 lives and only one survivor. For this man Georgio Buffani, a Greek sailor already injured, it was his third total shipwreck and the third time he had been the sole survivor. This was already the 15th wreck of the year in the Penzance Port area.

On 13 September 1867 a self-righting lifeboat named Daniel J Draper was brought from London, via Penzance, to Mullion where it was stationed in a newly built lifeboat house. On 21 October 1867, the occasion of her first launch, the lifeboat crew saved three lives from the wreck of the London barque Achilles, which became embayed in the Mounts Bay before grounding at Polurrian. The rescue also involved the Coastguard and use of the rocket apparatus from the beach which helped rescue a further 14 sailors.

After the wreck of the Achilles records the Royal Cornwall Gazette stated that "It is gratifying to notice that while the rocket apparatus was so successfully handled by the coastguard, the Mullion lifeboat also fulfilled her mission on this the first occasion of her putting to sea from her new station, where she has been hardly a month, and it is further gratifying to note that on the occasion of the last wreck along this coast on 26 March, twenty five lives were lost, the largest number on record, namely 18, have providentially been saved" (Lloyds List later put the number drowned in the wreck of the Jonkheer in March 1867 at 24).

On 19 April 1872 tragedy struck Mullion when the coxswain of the Mullion lifeboat, William Mundy, was drowned in an unexplained incident off Porthleven when his 18-foot sailing boat sank. He was a very experienced sailor and fisherman and was in the process of collecting some new nets from Porthleven. With him at the time were two of his sons, Joel (25) and Henry(13) and a carpenter, Henry John Williams (20), son of Peter Williams, former landlord of the Kings Arms at Mullion. The weather was squally, the wind was strong and at the time of the incident there were already 100 or so steamers and sailing ships sheltering off Penzance and in the Mounts Bay Roads. There is a memorial cross dedicated to Henry Mundy in Mullion parish church.

Between 1867 and 1887 the Daniel J Draper responded to 14 calls. It was replaced in 1889 by the Edith which responded to 2 calls, and in 1897 by the Nancy Newbon which responded to a further 7 calls. There were many occasions when the storms were too strong for even the lifeboat to be put to sea. In 1908 the crew and villagers were informed that the lifeboat was to be removed from Mullion and the last time the Nancy Newbon put to sea was a practice session on 18 June in fine weather and on a smooth sea, led by the coxswain Joseph Gilbert. Mr Franklin Mundy went through signalling procedures and the last session was watched by a large contingent of parishioners, some of whom took a trip in the boat. The lifeboat station was formally closed on 3 July 1908. During its time there were 4 coxswains: William Mundy (1867–1872), Samuel Mundy (1876–1906), William George (1906–1907), and Joseph Gilbert (1907–1908). There were three Honorary Secretaries during the same period: Rev. E. G. Harvey (1867–1884), John H. Shepherd (1884–1890), and Rev. J. H. Scholefield (1890–1908).

The significance of the rocket apparatus along the west Lizard Coast has sometimes been understated, but more lives were saved by this means than by the lifeboat, the Coastguard and local men always attended when summoned.

Three different lifeboats were stationed at Mullion between 1867 and 1908. They were all of the 'pulling and sailing' type, equipped with oars but also sails for when conditions allowed.

At Mullion	ON	Name	Length	Class	Comments
1867–1887	—	Daniel J. Draper	33 ft (10 m)	Self-Righter	
1887–1894	106	Edith	37 ft (11 m)	Self-Righter	
1894–1908	365	Nancy Newbon	38 ft (12 m)	Self-Righter	Transferred to Sunderland, withdrawn in 1912.

Even without a lifeboat the role played by Mullion Cove in the 20th century did not change. Even as recently as December 1932 there were reminders of the past. During strong SE gales a total of 84 cargo ships were forced to seek shelter in the Mullion Roads, Mounts Bay, between 2 and 3 miles (3.2 and 4.8 km) offshore. The majority were under 500 tons (gross tonnage) but there were at least five over 1000 tons. Once again the problem of ships food supplies also arose, and there was a danger of stores becoming exhausted. As it was, some of the smaller craft had to replenish their stocks of provisions in the village shops, thus causing a temporary shortage in Mullion. As the gale decreased the ships left their anchorage and departed for their destinations. However there were no losses.
