= Mullion, Cornwall =

Village in Cornwall, England

Coordinates: 50.027°N 5.241°W

Mullion: Cornish: Eglosvelyan
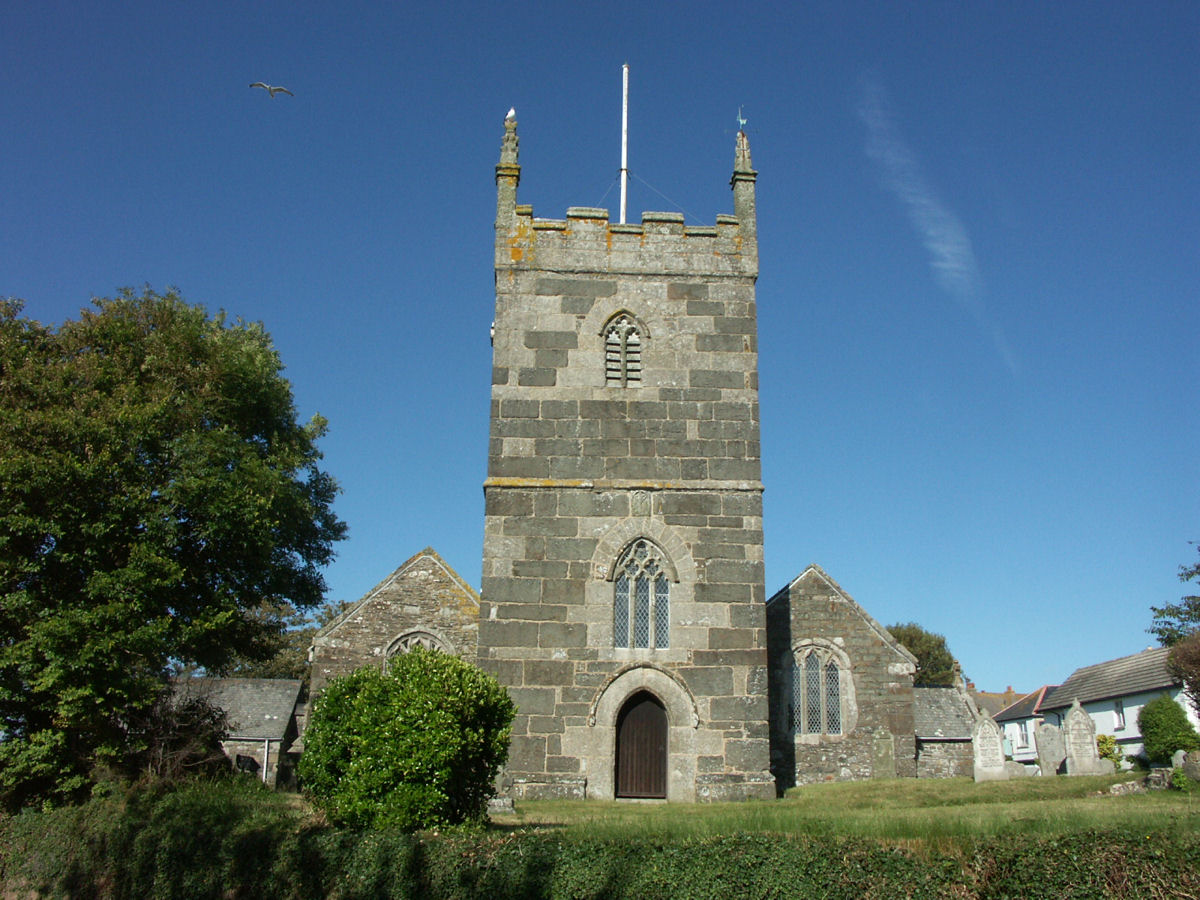
- The church of St Mellanus

- Location within Cornwall
- Population: 2,302 (2021 census)
- OS grid reference: SW678192
- Civil parish: Mullion
- Unitary authority: Cornwall
- Ceremonial county: Cornwall
- Region: South West
- Country: England
- Sovereign state: United Kingdom
- Post town: Helston
- Postcode district: TR12
- Dialling code: 01326
- Police: Devon and Cornwall
- Fire: Cornwall
- Ambulance: South Western
- UK Parliament: St Ives

Mullion (Cornish: Eglosvelyan) is a civil parish and village on the Lizard Peninsula in south Cornwall, England, United Kingdom. The nearest town is Helston approximately 5 miles (8 km) to the north.

Mullion civil parish encompasses the church town (now known simply as Mullion) and four smaller settlements: Mullion Cove and Predannack to the southwest; Trewoon and Meaver to the east. Mullion is bordered by the parishes of Gunwalloe and Cury to the north, Grade-Ruan to the east, Landewednack to the south, and by Mount's Bay to the west. The parish also includes Mullion Island, a uninhabited island approximately half a mile (0.8 km) offshore from Mullion Cove. The island is home to large colonies of seabirds and is owned by the National Trust.

== Toponymy ==
The parish name has evolved over the years, with references in the parish records to St Mullyon, St Mullian, Mullian, Mullyan, Mulion, Mullyon and St Mullion. In the Valor Ecclesiasticus carried out in 1535 the village name is recorded as Melyan. The parish takes its name from Saint Melaine, the Breton Bishop of Rennes who supposedly took office in 519. He was a man of many aliases including the Latin version, Saint Melanius. Reference to early publications and the 1908 Ordnance Survey maps show that the parish church was officially known as St Melan's until at least the start of the 20th century. In the late 19th century, Edmund Harvey (1828–84), vicar of Mullion, proposed that the parish took its name from 'Mellon' which he believed was an alias of Saint Malo. Saint Malo was a Welshman who moved to Brittany (possibly with his cousin, Saint Samson) where he became Bishop of Aleth (the region now called Saint-Malo) around AD 541. Harvey's ideas have since been discredited. However, an area near one of the ancient chapel sites was known as St Malo's Moor in Harvey's time, and nearby were two fields known as Sampson's Crofts. Harvey was vicar of Mullion 1865 to 1884; he was an author and musical composer, and interested in church music.

Mullion was surveyed for the Survey of English Dialects.

== History ==
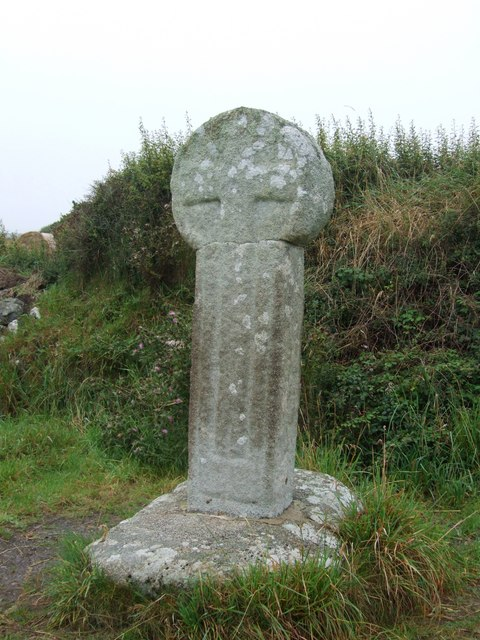
Predannack Cross

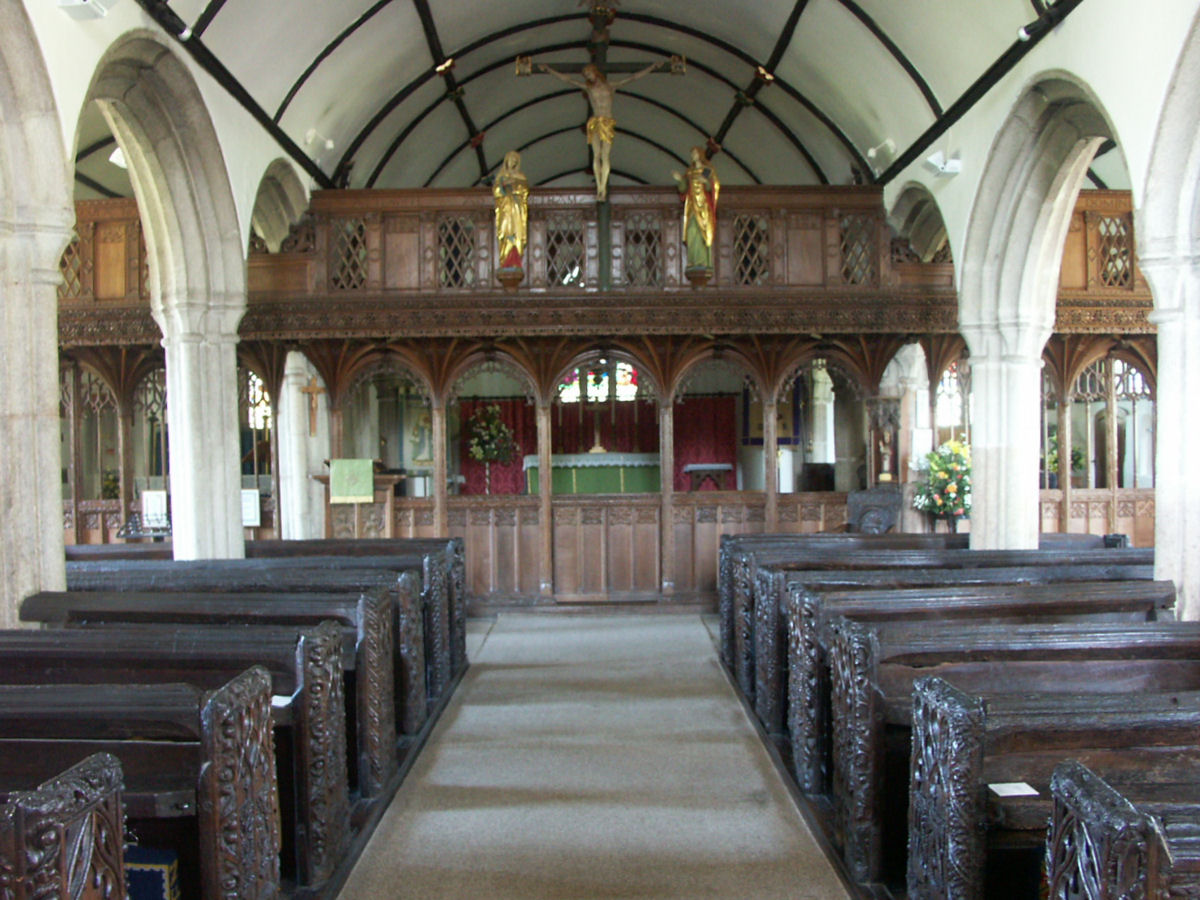
The church of St Mellanus

There is evidence for Bronze Age burial mounds, Celtic crosses and ancient chapel sites in the parish, and in more recent times evidence of copper and china clay mining. Several barrows at Angrowse yielded prehistoric remains when excavated. There is a Cornish cross near the hamlet of Predannack. It has a broad Latin cross on the front and an incised Latin cross on the back.

The existence of a Celtic church here is indicated by the place-names Tremenehee (meaning "sanctuary town") and Lanfrowder (cognate with Lafrowda, the Cornish name of St Just in Penwith) nearby. In Norman times the church of St Melanus lay in the fief of Rosewick; John de Rivers gave it to Mottesfont Priory in 1291 but in 1309 the priory conveyed it to the Dean and Chapter of Exeter. The vicarage was established in 1310 and the chancel of the church was rebuilt before 1331 by the executors of Bishop Bytton of Exeter. Of this chancel part remains but most of the church was built in the 15th century. Robert Luddra (vicar 1512–47) was also provost of Glasney College; he increased the endowment of the vicarage, and contributed funds for the roofs and tower. Features of interest include the fine series of bench ends and other old woodwork.

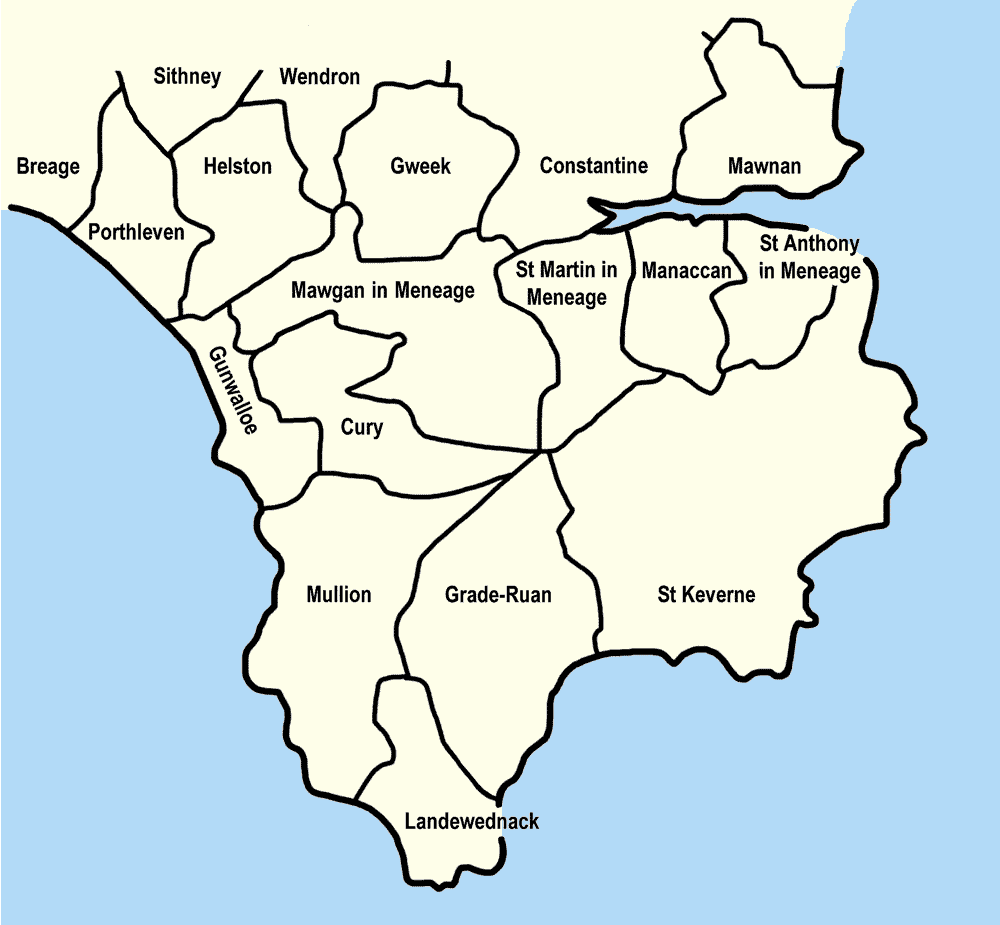
Mullion in relation to neighbouring parishes

In the six years up to 1873 there were nine wrecks along a mile-and-a-half stretch of coastline under Mullion cliffs with the loss of sixty-nine lives. The Royal National Lifeboat Institution stationed a lifeboat at Mullion Cove in 1867 but was withdrawn in 1908. The boat house has since been demolished but its barometer is on display in the village.

Like many other Cornish coastal villages there was a pilchard fishery, controlled by seining companies which started in the 18th century out of Mullion Cove. Caught by a seine net, the pilchards were cured at Newlyn and exported to Mediterranean countries. The companies posted a huer (a lookout) on Mullion Island to watch for the dark patch of a nearby shoal of pilchards. There are still a few boats operating a small shellfish industry.

There were a few short-lived copper mines in Mullion parish; first mentioned in a deed of 1741 and the mine(s) had a number of names; Ghost Croft, Goosecroft, Predannack Wartha, South Wheal Unity, Trenance and Wheal Providence. Wheal Unity (or Goosecroft), to the south of Churchtown, opened in 1847, and to the south-east of Pollurian Cove was a mid-19th-century copper mine called Wheal Fenwick. A native copper sheet, found in 1847, and with the dimensions of 9 metres (29'6") x 1.4 metres (4'8") x 15 cm (6") and weighing over 700 kg (14 cwt), from Wheal Unity was exhibited at the 1851 Great Exhibition in London. Compared with the rest of Cornwall, copper mining in Mullion was insignificant and ceased by the end of the 19th century. The mine buildings have disappeared but an adit can still be seen in Mullion Cove.

Talc was quarried in Soapy Cove in the south of the parish during the 18th century. The talc occurs locally as veins in the serpentinite, often known just as 'serpentine' (serpentinite is rich in serpentine minerals). The old quarries form an irregular scar heading from the shore inland. It was used for early porcelain production by Benjamin Lund in Bristol and taken over by the Worcester Porcelain Manufacturers in 1752.

Poldhu is the site of one of the main technological advances of the early twentieth century when in 1901, a Wireless signal was sent to St John's, Newfoundland, by Marconi. The technology was a precursor to radio, television, satellites and the internet, with Goonhilly Satellite Earth Station a nearby example.

Predannack Airfield was established by the RAF during World War II, and since 1958 has been used by the Royal Navy.

== Geography ==
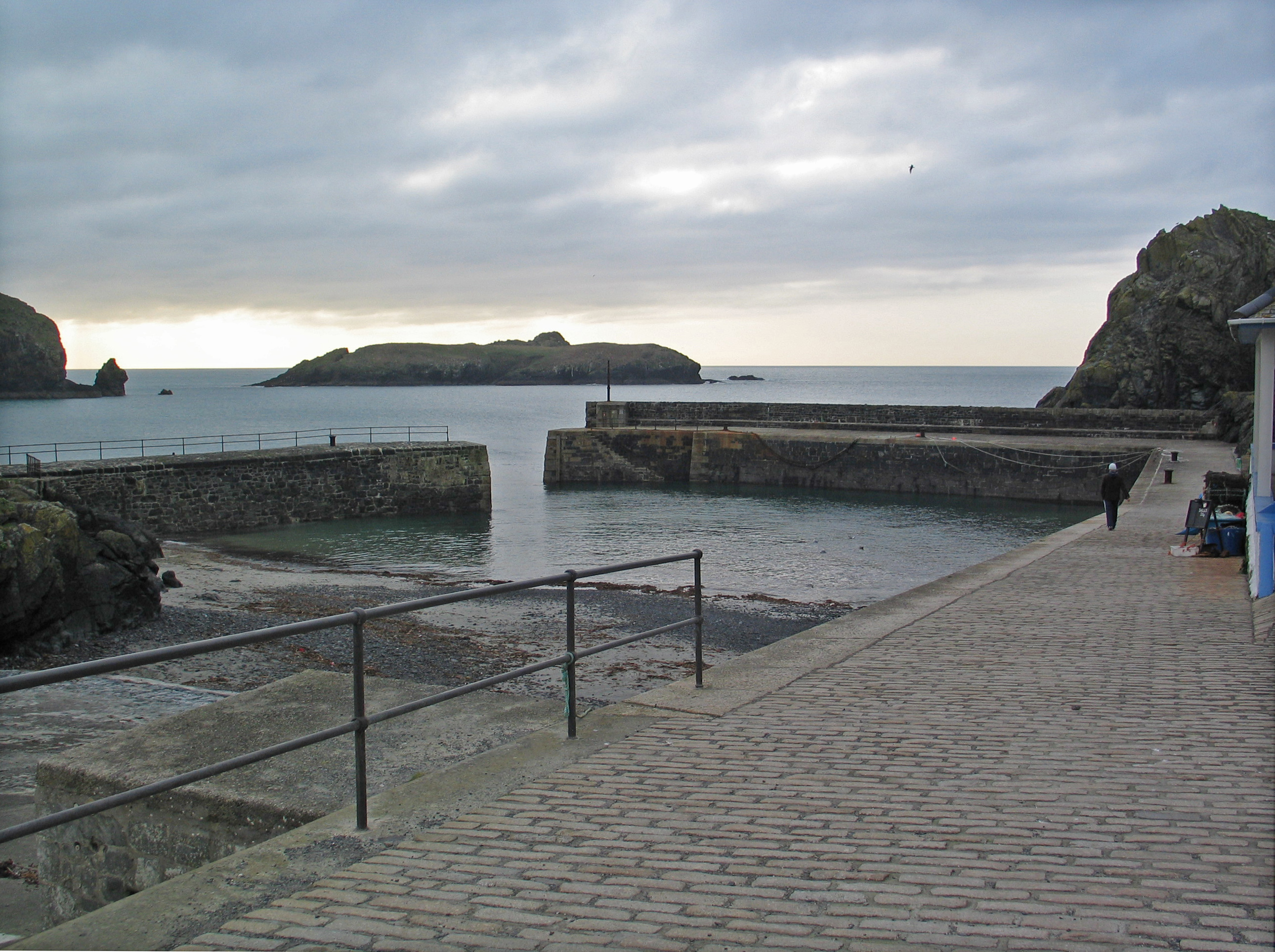
Mullion Island viewed from the harbour at Mullion Cove

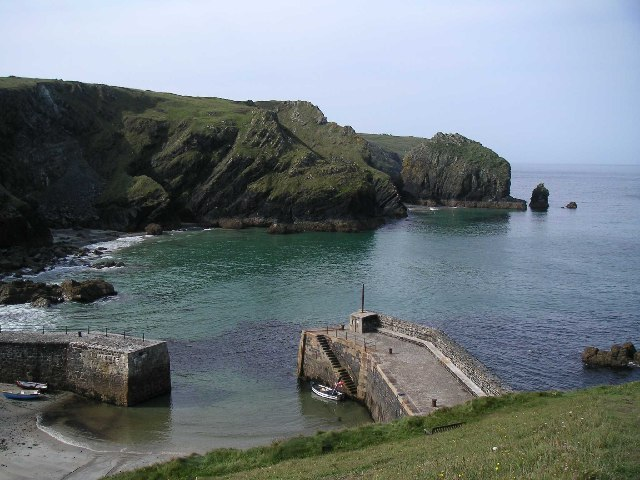
The harbour at Mullion Cove

The parish comprises 5,007 acres (20 km^{2}) of land, 8 acres (3.2 ha) of water and 55 acres (22 ha) of foreshore. It is on the Lizard Peninsula, which lies within the Cornwall National Landscape area. Mullion contains three designated Sites of Special Scientific Interest (SSSIs) – West Lizard SSSI, Baulk Head to Mullion SSSI and Mullion Cliff to Predannack Cliff SSSI, which includes Mullion Island. Mullion Cliff to Predannack Cliff SSSI is noted for its geological and biological interest and contains ten Red Data Book of rare and endangered plant species. Much of the Lizard National Nature Reserve (NNR) is within the parish boundary. The South West Coast Path, which follows the coast of south-west England from Somerset to Dorset passes by on the cliffs along the western edge of the parish.

=== Mullion Churchtown ===
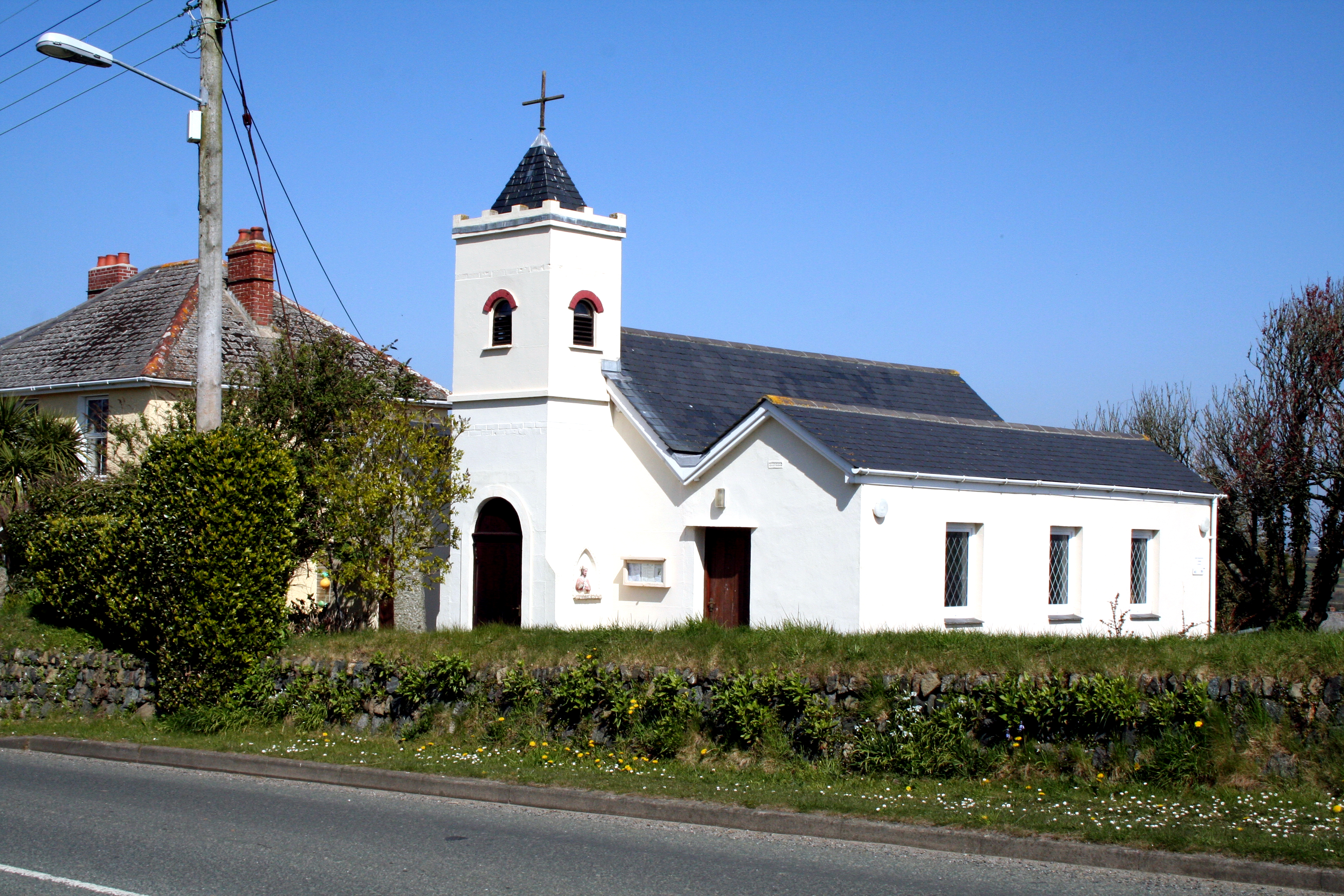
St Michael's church

The main village of Mullion is situated in the north of the parish, approximately 65 metres (213 ft) above sea level and about 1 mile (2 km) inland of the coast which is to its west. The village sits at the end of two river valleys which run southwest from the village, descending steeply to meet the sea at Polurrian Cove and Mullion Cove. North of the village is a third river valley descending west to east and meeting the sea at Poldhu Cove. This river defines the boundary between Mullion and the neighbouring parish of Gunwalloe. The geology of this part of the parish consists mainly of Hornblende Schists, only changing to slate north of Poldhu Cove. The land around the village and on the upper slopes of the river valleys is mostly fertile land cultivated for arable crops and livestock grazing. The small hamlets of Trewoon and Meaver are situated about half a mile to the east of Mullion village. Today Mullion is the largest village on the Lizard Peninsula and is a centre for local services and amenities as well as a popular tourist destination. Mullion School is the local secondary school. There are three churches in the parish: the parish church of St Mellanus (Anglican); the RC church of St Michael; and a Methodist church.

=== Predannack Downs ===
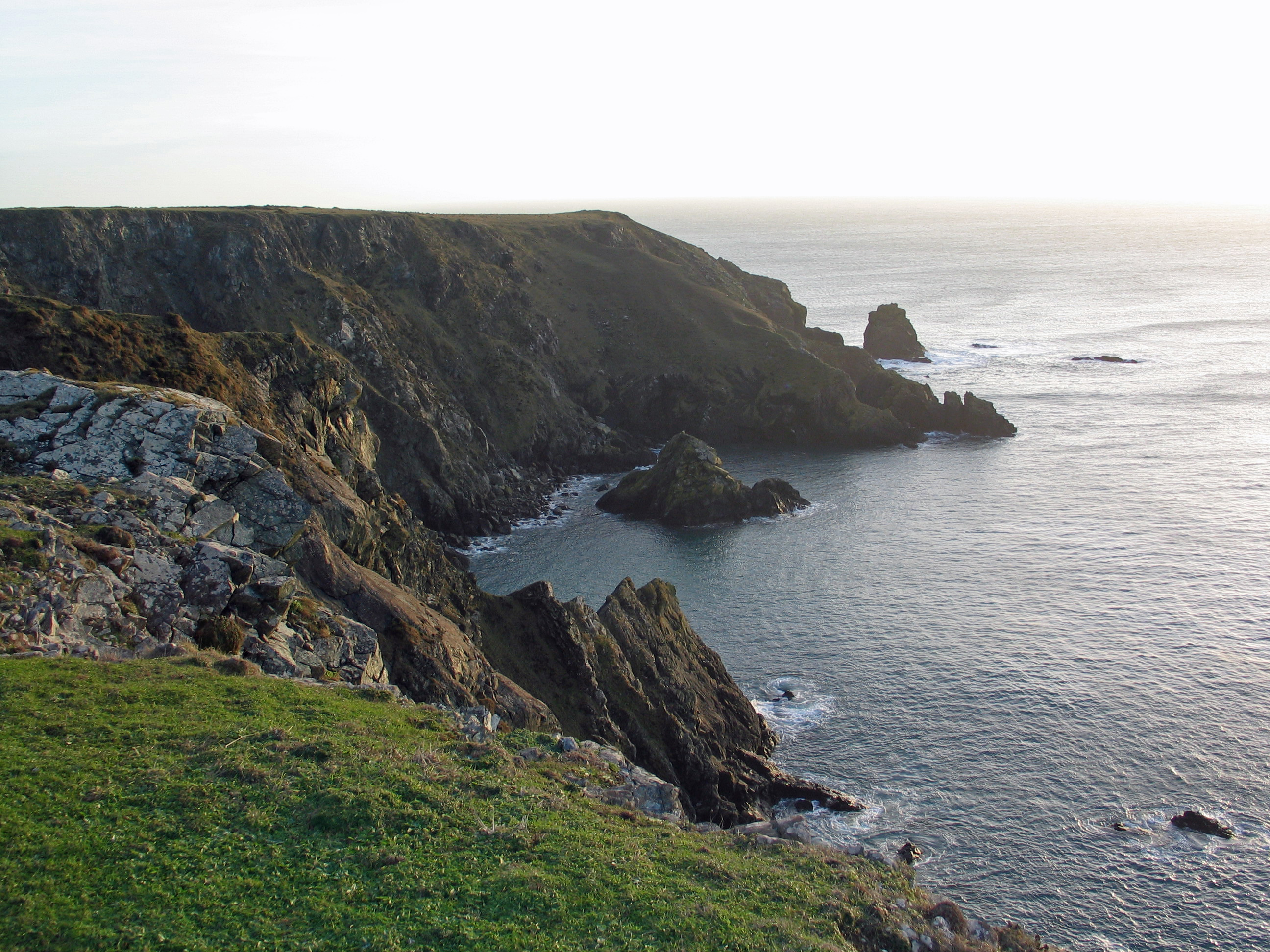
The coastline at the edge of Predannack Downs

To the south of the village the land gently rises and levels out onto a plateau at a height of around 85 metres (279 ft) above sea level. In contrast to the northern part of the parish this area remains as semi-natural heath, the growth of which is encouraged by the change in geology south of Mullion Cove to serpentinite. This area is known as Predannack Downs, it is part of the Lizard National Nature Reserve. In the centre of the downs lies the World War II Predannack Airfield, currently a satellite of nearby RNAS Culdrose.

The southern extent of the parish is marked by a steep, narrow river valley cut into the downs, meeting the sea at Kynance Cove. The coastline along the edge of the downs between Kynance Cove and Mullion Cove consists of high dramatic sheer cliffs with the exception of a deep narrow cleft cut into the Downs at Gew-graze, also known as Soapy Cove. This cove is named after soapstone, a talc-rich type of serpentinite rock found around the cove. Talc was quarried here in the 18th century.

== Governance ==
For the purposes of local government Mullion is a civil parish and every four years elects a parish council consisting of ten councillors. The principal local authority is Cornwall Council and an electoral ward with the same name covers the parish and the surrounding land to Lizard Point. The population of the ward, at the 2011 census, was 4,364.

== Demographics ==
Census population of Mullion parish
Census	Population	Female	Male	Households	Source
2001	1,986	1,060	926	887	
2011	2,091	1,078	1,013	942	
2021	2,302	1,197	1,105	960	

== Sports ==
Mullion AFC is an association football club playing their home matches at Clifton Parc. The first team play in the Cornwall Combination League, the reserves in the Trelawny League and a women's team in the Cornwall Women's Football League. Mullion Cricket Club play in the second tier of the Cornwall Cricket League; County Division 1.

Mullion Golf Club was founded in 1895 and is the most southerly golf course in the UK. It is situated in the parish of Gunwalloe.

Cornish wrestling tournaments, for prizes, have been held in Mullion.

== Notable residents ==
- Svetlana Alliluyeva (1926–2011), later known as Lana Peters, was the daughter of Joseph Stalin and spent part of her life in Mullion.
- Stephen Halden Beattie (1908 – 1975 in Mullion) was awarded the Victoria Cross for captaining HMS Campbeltown which was used to ram and destroy the dock gates in Saint-Nazaire to prevent its use by the German battleship Tirpitz.
- James Erisey was born at Erisey House near Mullion approx 1560. He sailed as a privateer with Sir Francis Drake.
- Andrew Henry George (born 1958 in Mullion) is a British Liberal Democrat politician who was MP for St Ives from 1997 to 2015.
- Ernest Herbert Pitcher (1888 in Mullion – 1946) was petty officer in the Royal Navy awarded the Victoria Cross.
- Sheila Tracy (née Lugg; 1934 in Mullion – 2014) was a British broadcaster, writer, musician, and singer. She began her career as a trombone player during the 1950s in all-female bands.
- Geoffrey Wellum (1921–2018) was a British Battle of Britain fighter pilot, Squadron Leader, recipient of the Distinguished Flying Cross, and author who retired to Mullion in the mid 1980s.
