= Serzhik, go away! =

Armenian political slogan

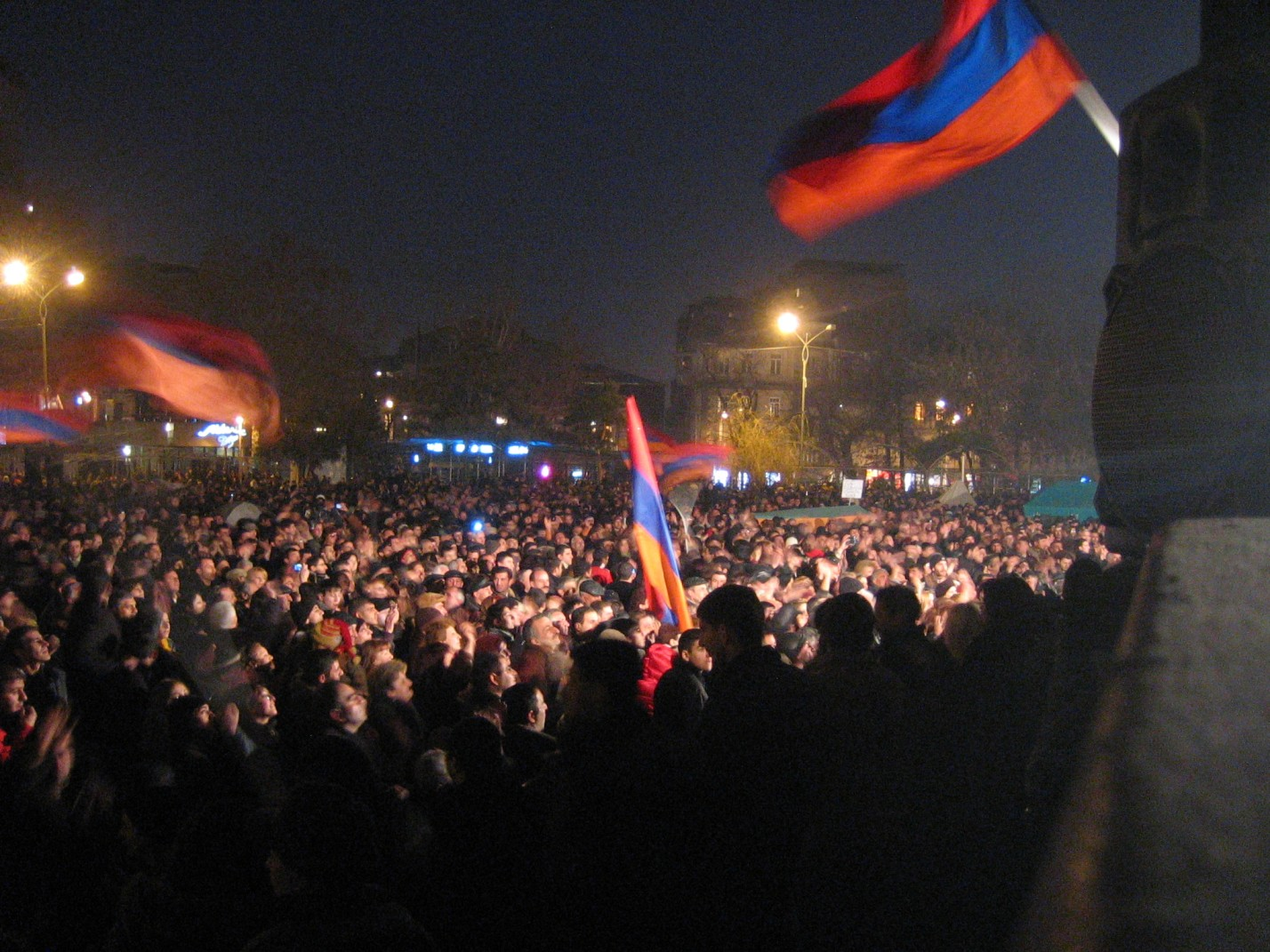
The fifth day of Armenian presidential election protests 2008

Serzhik, go away! (Armenian: Սերժի՛կ, հեռացի՛ր, romanized: Serzhik, herrats’ir ) is a political slogan of the Armenian opposition which was spread since 2008 when Serzh Sargsyan already had been the President of Armenia about a year.

This slogan firstly was sounded on the meeting of The Armenian National Congress,/ After some time, some view it as non-partial and utilized by many political parties and the whole people, including the veterans of the First Nagorno-Karabakh War.

This slogan also is fairly common in the Armenian diaspora. It has been used in Strasbourg, Prague, Paris, Los Angeles etc.

According to the director of the Armenian center of strategic and national researches Manvel Sarkisyan, "Serzhik, go away!" slogan purchased the universal character against economical and social-political stagnation.

== See also ==
- 2018 Armenian revolution – Protests that led to Prime Minister Serzh Sargsyan's resignation
- FDT (song), an acronym for "Fuck Donald Trump"; a 2016 single by YG featuring Nipsey Hussle
- Maggie Out – Anti-Margaret Thatcher Chant based on Oggy Oggy Oggy
- Putin khuylo! – Slogan deriding Vladimir Putin
- Yetnahaw Gaa ! – Algerian Arabic protest slogan
