= University Credit Union Pavilion =

Multi-purpose arena at Saint Mary's College of California

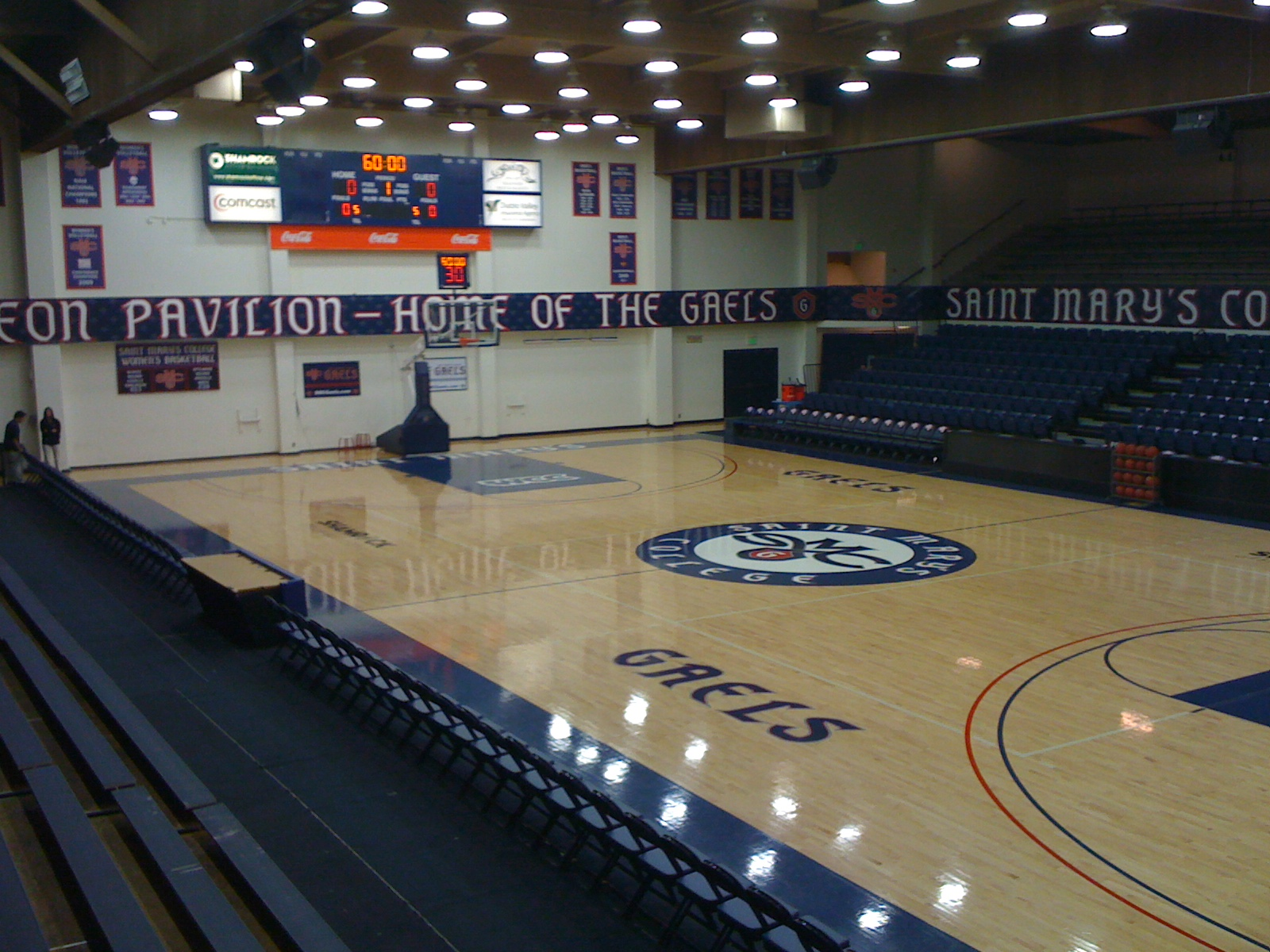
- Interactive map of University Credit Union Pavilion
- Former names: McKeon Pavilion (1978–2019)
- Location: 1928 Saint Marys Road, Moraga, California
- Coordinates: 37.841247°N 122.106409°W
- Owner: Saint Mary's College of California
- Operator: Saint Mary's College of California
- Capacity: 3,500

Construction
- Opened: January 21, 1978

Tenant
- Saint Mary's Gaels (NCAA)

University Credit Union Pavilion (formerly McKeon Pavilion) is a 3,500-seat multi-purpose arena at Saint Mary's College of California in Moraga, California. Home men's and women's basketball and volleyball games are held in the gymnasium, the team nickname being the Gaels. Many athletic camps for youths also use the gym, primarily in the summer, and other on-campus events, such as the Baccalaureate mass, are also held there. Banners commemorating successful seasons, championships and post-season appearances for all Saint Mary's sports hang on the back wall. At well-attended games, the court-level bleachers opposite the benches are reserved entirely for students.

Common criticism of the gym, including by students, is its age and size. It is one of the smaller gyms in the West Coast Conference. The seating is mainly along two sides, running along the long sides of the court. Behind one basket is a large wall, and behind another a handful of elevated, VIP seats. Seating is mostly bleacher-style, not stadium style. However, many feel that the small size of the gym adds to the intensity of the crowd at sold-out games, when the cheers of 3,500 fans are amplified due to the small space. Because of this, McKeon Pavilion is considered by many to be one of the tougher gyms to play in for an opposing team. Current athletic director Mark Orr has said there are design plans that would knock out the front and back walls of the gym, adding 1,000 seats, but there is not yet funding for the project.

With gym renovations years away, the college has made several upgrades to the facility. Prior to the 2005-2006 season new floors were installed. Before the 2006-2007 season, the lower level reserved seating (directly behind the benches) was changed from bleachers to stadium-style seats with backs. The bleachers in the student section (also known as Gaelforce) - opposite the benches - were painted dark blue. Large banners were hung from the railings separating the upper and lower seating sections, reading "Saint Mary's College" behind the reserved seating and "Gaelforce" behind the student section.

In the 21st century, the arena's culture has increasingly reflected the Gaels' strong Australian connections, with at least one Australian player on the men's basketball roster in each season since 2001–02 (among them current NBA players Patty Mills and Matthew Dellavedova) and a program record of seven in the 2016–17 season. The student section has been filled with Australian flags, a large Australian flag is now prominently displayed on a back wall of the arena, and the student section regularly responds to big plays with the "Aussie, Aussie, Aussie" chant.

In recent memory, the gym has seen the 2001 women's basketball team and the 2005 men's basketball team reach the NCAA Tournament. The women's volleyball team has also achieved much success, reaching the post-season in 2004-2006. During the 2004–2005 season the men's basketball team posted a 15–1 record in their home gym en route to a bubble NCAA tournament berth. On January 8, 2005, the men's basketball team defeated West Coast Conference powerhouse Gonzaga University 89–81 in McKeon, ending a 17-game losing streak against the Zags and handing Gonzaga its first conference loss in 17 games.

It opened January 21, 1978. It is the largest enclosed arena in Contra Costa County. In 2019, the name was changed to University Credit Union Pavilion.

== See also ==
- List of NCAA Division I basketball arenas
