= Matthew Perna =

American Capitol rioter (1984–2022)

- Born: June 27, 1984
- Died: February 25, 2022 (aged 37)
- Cause of death: Suicide
- Education: Pennsylvania State University
- Known for: Participation in the January 6 United States Capitol attack, suicide while awaiting sentencing
- Criminal charges: Witness tampering, entering and remaining in a restricted building or grounds, 2 counts of disorderly conduct

Matthew Lawrence Perna (June 27, 1984 – February 25, 2022) was an American man who took part in the United States Capitol attack on January 6, 2021. Perna, aged 37, died by suicide in February 2022 while awaiting his sentencing on charges of witness tampering, entering and remaining in a restricted building or grounds, and two counts of disorderly conduct. On January 20, 2025, the first day of the second presidency of Donald Trump, Trump posthumously pardoned Perna in his pardon of January 6 United States Capitol attack defendants.

== Early life ==
Perna graduated from Pennsylvania State University. He had previously lived in Thailand and South Korea.

== January 6 United States Capitol attack ==
According to a statement of offense, Perna travelled from Sharpsville, Pennsylvania, to the Washington "Stop the Steal" rally, which he attended with Stephen Ayres. He wore a red hoodie on which the phrase "Make America Great Again" was printed.

He marched to the Capitol with the crowd. He later stated to police that upon reaching the top of the steps on the west side of the building, he found an open door and was subsequently pushed into the building by the crowd that formed behind him. He spent the next 20 minutes inside the Capitol building. He recorded himself on his phone chanting "USA! USA!" with the crowd. He later told agents he tapped a window with a metal flagpole after becoming frustrated.

After leaving the building, court documents state that Perna went to a hotel room, in which he recorded a video with two other people. In the eight-minute video, which he uploaded to Facebook, he made the claim that people with Antifa were "chiefly" responsible for breaking the doors and the windows at the Capitol, and that "it’s not over, trust me. The purpose of today was to expose Pence as a traitor," referring to then-Vice President Mike Pence.

=== Arrest and trial ===
The Federal Bureau of Investigation shared a photograph of Perna in the hopes of identifying him; this was recognized by a person familiar with Perna who pointed to Perna's alleged support for Trump and QAnon on his Facebook page.

He was charged alongside Ayres with witness tampering, entering and remaining in a restricted building or grounds, and two counts of disorderly conduct. Perna pleaded guilty to all charges in December 2021, on advice from his defense attorney that he could expect a maximum sentence of 6 to 12 months if he did so. After this, prosecutors brought up the possibility of a sentencing enhancement of domestic terrorism that could have resulted in Perna spending 7–12 years in prison. Following this, his case was delayed multiple times over 13 months, with his sentencing scheduled for March or April 1, 2023.

== Death ==
Perna died by suicide at age 37 on February 25, 2022, prior to his sentencing. His obituary read that he "died of a broken heart," and that "his community (which he loved), his country, and the justice system killed his spirit and his zest for life." It further stated that Perna "did not have a hateful bone in his body. He embraced people of all races, income brackets, and beliefs, never once berating anyone for having different view." It said he attended the riot "to peacefully stand up for his beliefs" and that "he immediately turned himself in" upon learning the FBI was searching for him, as well as that "the constant delays in hearings, and postponements dragged out for over a year. Because of this, Matt's heart broke and his spirit died."

In 2023, his aunt Geri Perna visited Donald Trump's Mar-a-Lago resort with other family members of people charged in the attack; while there, Trump promised to posthumously pardon Matthew. In June 2024, The Washington Post reported that Perna was the only known individual rioter whom Trump had specifically promised to pardon.

In March 2024, U.S. representative Marjorie Taylor Greene introduced a bill named for Perna, stating that it "ensures that the political persecution witnessed in the aftermath of January 6th is curtailed by the law", barring the detention of nonviolent political protesters.

Perna was one of at least three participants in the Capitol attack to die by suicide, along with 47-year-old Mark Aungst of Pennsylvania and 53-year-old Christopher Georgia of Georgia.

== See also ==
- List of cases of the January 6 United States Capitol attack (M-S)
- Criminal proceedings in the January 6 United States Capitol attack
- List of people granted executive clemency in the second Trump presidency
- List of people pardoned or granted clemency by the president of the United States
