= Kellon Yaani Kellon =

Lebanese protest slogan

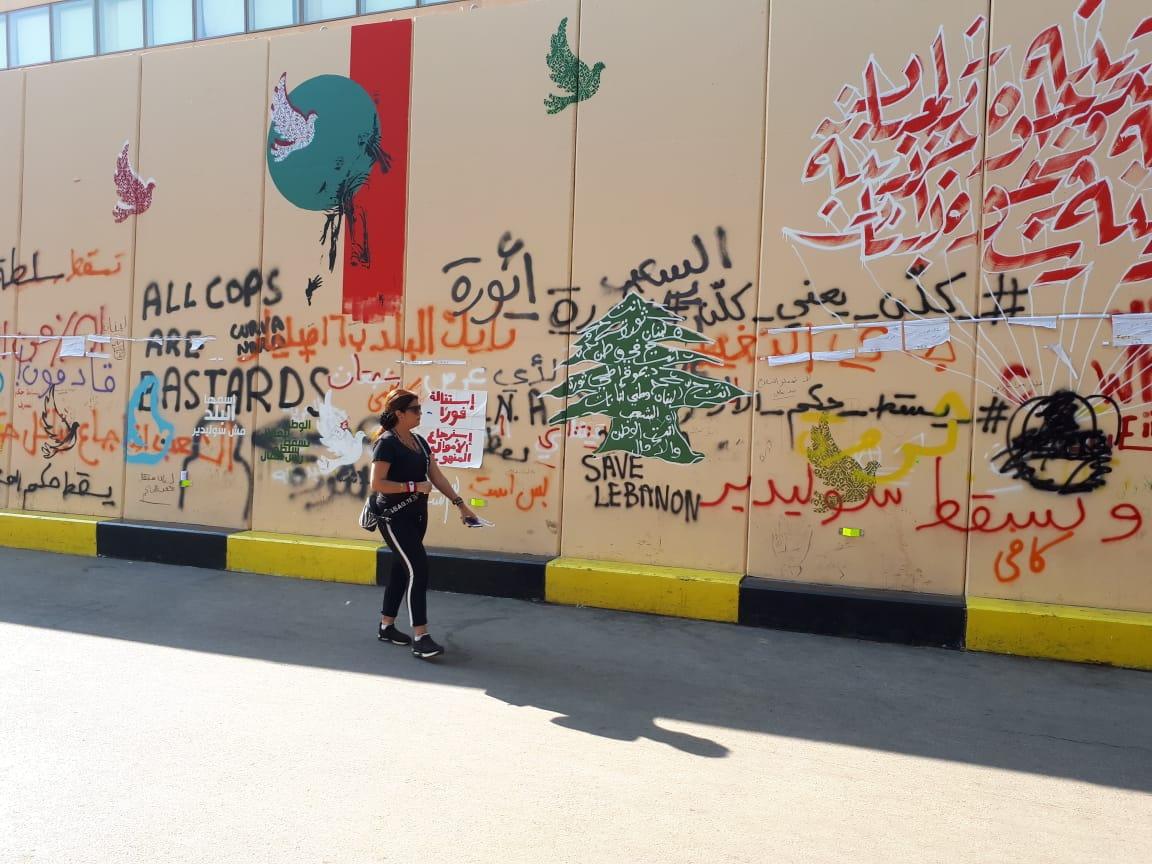
Protest-related graffiti in Beirut, Lebanon

Kellon Yaani Kellon (Levantine Arabic: كلّن يعني كلّن, lit. 'all of them means all of them'), often written Kellon ya3ni kellon, is a slogan in Lebanese Arabic, which appeared during the protests that took place in Lebanon from 2019 to 2021. It became a central rallying cry of demonstrators who rejected the entire Lebanese political class, regardless of sectarian or ideological stance, and accusing all parties and leaders of corruption, mismanagement, and responsibility for the country's deepening economic and social crises. The slogan is usually translated as "all of them means all of them," with the meaning that no political figure or faction should be exempt from accountability.

== See also ==
- Anti-establishment – Opposition to the conventional social, political, and economic principles of a society
- Il est interdit d'interdire ! ("it is forbidden to forbid!") – French aphorism and a slogan of May 68
- Nonviolent resistance – Act of protest through nonviolent means
- Yetnahaw Gaa ! – Algerian Arabic protest slogan, used in the 2019 Algerian Protests
- Ash-shab yurid isqat an-nizam – Political slogan used during the Arab Spring
- Politics of Lebanon
