= Oi (interjection) =

Interjection used in English varieties

Oi (/ɔɪ/) is an interjection used in various varieties of the English language, particularly Australian, British, Indian, Irish, New Zealand, and South African, as well as non-English languages such as Chinese, Tagalog, Tamil, Hindi/Urdu, Indonesian, Italian, Japanese, and Portuguese to get the attention of another person or to express surprise or disapproval. It is sometimes used in Canadian English and very rarely in American English. The word is also common in the Indian subcontinent, where it has varied pronunciations of "O-ee" and "O-ye".

"Oi" has been particularly associated with working class and Cockney speech. It is effectively a local pronunciation of "hoy" (see H-dropping), an older expression. A study of the Cockney dialect in the 1950s found that whether it was being used to call attention or as a challenge depended on its tone and abruptness. The study's author noted that the expression is "jaunty and self-assertive" as well as "intensely cockney".

A poll of non-English speakers by the British Council in 2004 found that "oi" was considered the 61st most beautiful word in the English language. A spokesman commented that "Oi is not a word that I would've thought turned up in English manuals all that often." "Oi" was added to the list of acceptable words in US Scrabble in 2006.

== In other languages ==
According to Friedrich Nietzsche, in Greek, oi was an expression of pain, and someone who was in pain or miserable was said to be oizuros. In Latin, the similar oiei was a cry of pain.

Coincidentally, the term oi (おい) in informal Japanese is used in the same way as British English, typically by older men to subordinates; an elongated ōi is used when someone is at a distance.

Also, in Portuguese, oi! [oj] means "hi" – mostly in Brazil, as people in Portugal tend to prefer olá; still, under the exclusively Brazilian usage, the interrogative oi? can be used in the sense of "excuse me?" and "what did you say?", sometimes showing disapproval or disbelief of something said previously, or "yes?", generally when answering the telephone or intercom.

In Catalan, oi? is used at the end of a question, with a meaning similar to "isn't it?"

In dialects of rural central Iranian Persian language and Luri language, oi (Persian: اوی) has the same usage as in English.

In the Indian subcontinent, such as in India and Pakistan, oi is also used as an exclamation in various contexts. For example, it can be used to call someone from a distance, as a way of showing aggression, or when someone is surprised. Oi or Oye is also used for calling someone in an informal or casual manner in Tamil, Urdu, Punjabi, and most of the other Indian languages and Pakistani languages as well.

In Bengali, oi (Bengali pronunciation: [oj], written either ঐ or ওই ) means "that" (typically with something within sight).

In Russian, Ukrainian, Belarusian, oy (ой) is often used as an expression of various degrees of surprise, like "Whoops" or "Oh".

In the Scandinavian languages, Oi! or the Swedish variant, Oj!, is commonly used as an exclamation of surprise, like "Oh" or "Whoops".

In Indonesian hoi, oi, and woi (from Cantonese 喂 (wai^{2}) and Hokkien 喂 (oeh)) are used to call someone.

In Philippine languages the equivalent is hoy or oy, sometimes pronounced uy. This is commonly used throughout the Philippines with friends and family as an attention-grabbing interjection, but is rarely used with strangers per social customs.

In Vietnamese, oi, spelt in the Vietnamese alphabet as ơi, is regularly used to call attention to a person in a sentence. It is used in conjunction with a name or a pronoun. For example, ơi is used to get the attention of a waiter in a restaurant, or a teacher in a classroom. It is used in every social setting in Vietnam from family to business environments.

In Kazakh, өй [зi] is used to express surprise, or it can be used to call attention, often with dissatisfaction.

== In popular culture ==
Any time you're Lambeth way,
Any evening, any day,
You'll find us all
Doin' the Lambeth Walk. Oi!

— The opening lyrics of
The Lambeth Walk

The 1937 musical song The Lambeth Walk from Me and My Girl ends with a cry of "Oi!", expressing defiance and transgression of the working-class characters; it was newsworthy when King George VI of the United Kingdom and Queen Elizabeth were at one performance and "with the rest of the audience, cocked their thumbs and shouted Oi!"

The phrase gained a certain notoriety due to a British working-class punk rock subgenre being named Oi!. Originating in the late 1970s, the genre and its associated subculture had the goal of bringing together punks, skinheads and other working-class youths. The term was later used in the Blur song "Parklife", which exemplified its appeal to a new generation of mockneys. The term also evolved to be used in Multicultural London English; a 2002 UK Top 10 hit by the grime music group More Fire Crew was titled "Oi!".

Energizer battery commercials in the late 1980s and early 1990s featured Mark "Jacko" Jackson, who'd end the commercials with his trademark "Oi!"

== See also ==
- Oggy Oggy Oggy
  - Aussie Aussie Aussie, Oi Oi Oi
- Oy vey, a similar-sounding Yiddish exclamation for dismay
- Yo
