= Yetnahaw gaâ =

Algerian Arabic protest slogan

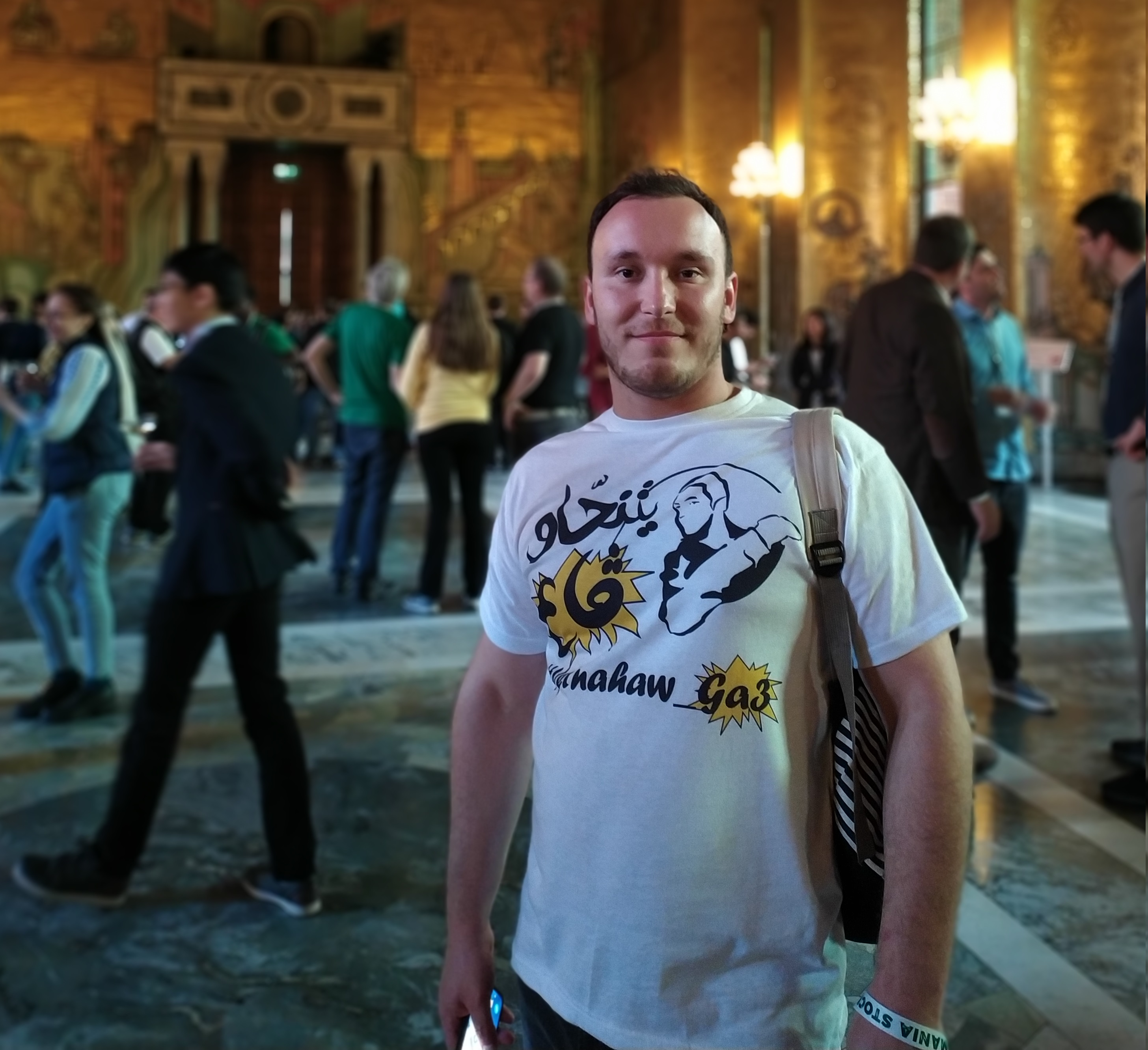
A person in Stockholm wearing a T-shirt with the slogan

Yetnahaw gaâ (They All Should Go), often written Yetnahaw ga3 !, is a slogan in Algerian Arabic (يتنحاو ڨاع), which appeared during the protests that took place in Algeria from 2019 to early 2021. It has become a sort of rallying cry of internet surfers since the publication of a video on social media showing a young Algerian interrupting a local correspondent of the television channel Sky News Arabia, on the evening of 11 March 2019 where ex-president Abdelaziz Bouteflika announced he was giving up a fifth term. The idea behind this slogan is that anyone who has led or participated in any way in the governance of the country should be hunted.

== History ==
On 11 March 2019, a 33-year-old Algerian citizen, Sofiane Bakir Turki, interrupted the direction of a journalist who commented on the event in Modern Standard Arabic in a large boulevard of Algiers, the young man affirming in Algerian Arabic: "Yetnahaw gaa!"

"Yatnahaw gaa!" advocates the departure of all those who have benefited, contributed, participated, strengthened and protected the ex-president during the 20 years of his reign, failing which, any attempt to transition to a democratic model risks to be torpedoed by these individuals when we speak of counter-revolution, it is of these that it is. The video made a buzz the day after the announcement of the president and went viral. Netizens used a hashtag #Yetnahaw_Ga3. This is the most common slogan in all the events. It has been used on banners since March 2019 and the local and international media often mention it to report on the events in Algeria.

At the Cannes Film Festival in 2019, Algerian actors brandished signs and badges mentioning the slogan "Yetnahaw ga3!" in support of the Algerian protesters.

== See also ==
- Anti-establishment – Opposition to the conventional social, political, and economic principles of a society
- Il est interdit d'interdire ! ("it is forbidden to forbid!") – French aphorism and a slogan of May 68
- Nonviolent resistance – Act of protest through nonviolent means
- Kellon Yaani Kellon – Lebanese protest slogan, used in the 2019 Protests
