= Maggie Out =

Anti-Margaret Thatcher Chant based on Oggy Oggy Oggy

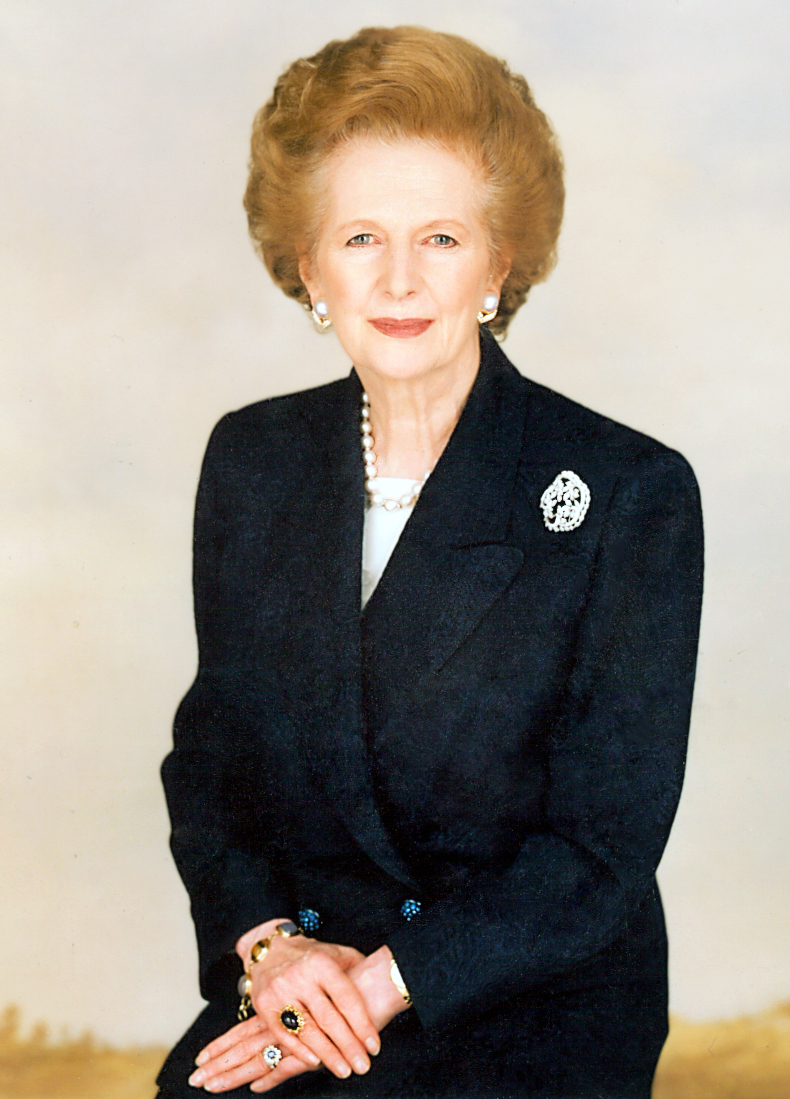
Margaret Thatcher, target of the chant

"Maggie Out" was a chant popular during the miners' strike, student grant protests, poll tax protests and other public demonstrations that fell within the time when Margaret Thatcher was the prime minister of the United Kingdom.

== Lyrics ==
The chant called for her to be removed from that role. It was referred to, in that context, during a parliamentary session in 1982. When Margaret Thatcher felt compelled to resign some people had memories of chanting it for thirteen years. People were passionate about this group activity and associated it with varied political struggles from that time.

It is a variant of the "Oggy Oggy Oggy, Oi Oi Oi" chant. When used in that format, the lyrics were:

Maggie, Maggie, Maggie!
Out! Out! Out!

Maggie, Maggie, Maggie!
Out! Out! Out!

Maggie!
Out!

Maggie!
Out!

Maggie, Maggie, Maggie!
Out! Out! Out!

The Larks produced a track called "Maggie, Maggie, Maggie (Out, Out, Out)" which was included on the Miners' Benefit LP "Here We Go" on Sterile Records.

Upon Thatcher's resignation, groups of opponents gathered at Downing Street, chanting a variation – replacing the word "out" with "gone".

Following the death of Thatcher on 8 April 2013, this chant was revived in the format of "Maggie, Maggie Maggie (Dead, Dead, Dead)" at celebratory parties held in Glasgow, London and Reading.

== See also ==
- Let's Go Brandon – an anti-Biden chant which is a minced oath for "Fuck Joe Biden".
- Thanks, Obama – a slogan that gained popular use through viral memes protesting the presidency of Barack Obama.
- Putin khuylo! – an anti-Vladimir Putin chant that is popular in Ukraine after the annexation of Crimea.
- FDT – hip-hop protest song whose title is an initialism for "Fuck Donald Trump".
- Serzhik, go away! – Armenian political slogan protesting against Serzh Sargsyan
