= List of Cornish dialect words =

This is a select list of Cornish dialect words in English—while some of these terms are obsolete others remain in use. Many Cornish dialect words have their origins in the Cornish language and others belong to the West Saxon group of dialects which includes West Country English: consequently words listed may not be exclusive to Cornwall.

Table of contents:
A B C D E F G H I J K L M N O P Q R S T U V W X Y Z
• See also • References • Further reading

== A ==
- Abroad – *Abroad – 1. open: "laive the door abroad, boy." 2. in pieces: " 'e scat en abroad"
- Addled – 1. spoilt, rotten 2. empty, cracked or broken; e.g. addled eggs
- Ager – ugly (Zennor, in use after the year 1800, from Cornish language hager)
- Agerever – pollack (Marazion, in use after the year 1800, from Cornish language hager euver, meaning 'ugly useless')
- Aglets – hawthorn berries
- Agone – ago; as in 'a week agone' (mid and east Cornwall)
- Airymouse - a bat
- Ake – a groove made on the stone of a killick (Mousehole, in use after the year 1800, from Cornish language ak, meaning 'a slit', or 'a cleft')
- All-overish – slightly out of sorts, nervous
- Allycumpooster - all right (Camborne, in use after the year 1800, from Cornish language oll yn komposter, meaning 'all in order')
- Ancient - to describe someone who is a real character, "he's an ancient man".
- Anker - a small barrel (mining term, ultimately from Medieval Latin anceria ["a small vat"] perhaps influenced by Cornish language keryn, meaning 'open barrel' or 'tub'. Compare Danish anker ["beer barrel, wine cask, anker"])
- Ansome - lovely (from "handsome"); Me ansome ("my handsome") (familiar way to address a man)
- Anvon - a hard stone on which large stones are broken (mining term, from Cornish language anwen, meaning 'anvil'))
- Areah, Arear, Aree faa - an exclamation of surprise (in use after the year 1800, from Cornish language revedh, meaning 'strange', 'astounding', or 'a wonder')
- Arish (also written [and alternatively pronounced] arrish, ersh, aish, airish, errish, hayrish and herrish) - arable field (from Middle English *ersch, from Old English ersc [“a park, preserve; stubble-field”], perhaps influenced by Cornish language arys)
- Arish mow – a stack of sheaves (in use after the year 1800, from Cornish language arys)
- Are 'em – aren't they
- Awn – a cove / haven
- Aye? – I beg your pardon?; Yes? What was that?
- Ayes (pronounced, 'ace') – yes (see also: "Ess", below). Perhaps from Old Norse ei ("forever") + Old English sī(e) ("may it be"), like "yes" (which is from Middle English yes, yis, which is from Old English ġēse, ġīse, ġȳse, *ġīese [“yes, of course, so be it”], equivalent to ġēa [“yes", "so”] + sī[e] [“may it be”]). Alternatively, a modification of "aye" based on "yes". Further, possibly a conflation of any (or all) of the previous, and "ess", which may represent a dialectal form of "yes".

== B ==
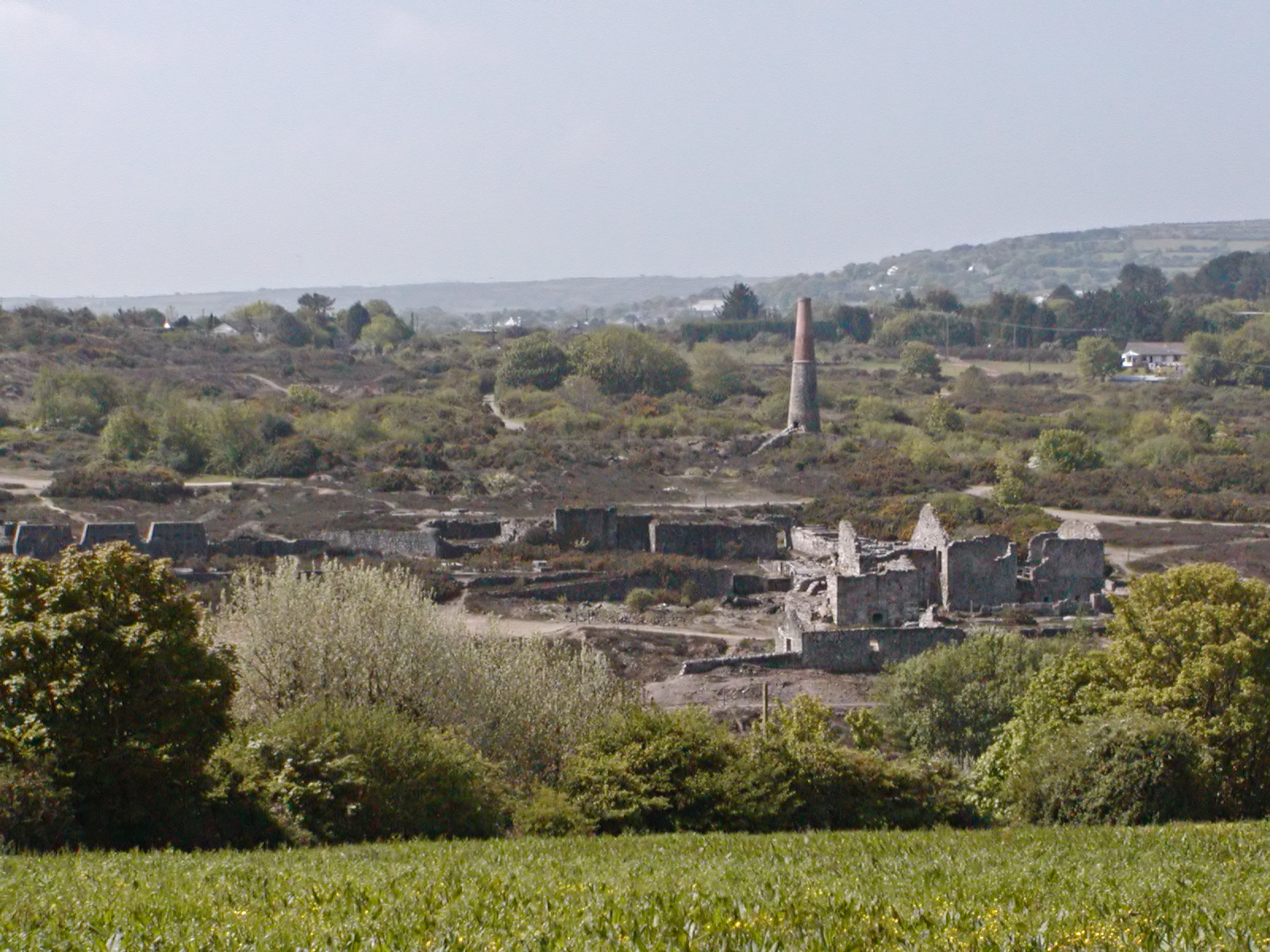
The ruins of Poldice mine, Gwennap

Bal maidens at work, showing traditional dress

- Backalong – in former times
- Backsyfore – the wrong side first (also found in Devon)
- Bal – a mine (in use after the year 1800, from Cornish language, related to palas, meaning 'to dig')
- Bal maiden – a woman working at a mine, at smashing ore &c.
- Ball – a pest, used figuratively (in use after the year 1800, from Cornish language ball meaning 'a pest', or 'the plague')
- Bamfer – to worry, harass, or torment
- Bamfoozle – deceive, confuse, especially by trickery
- Bannal – the broom plant (in use after the year 1800, from Cornish language banal, short for banadhel, meaning 'broom')
- Barker – a whetstone
- Begrumpled – displeased, affronted
- Belong – 1. live or work – "where do 'ee belong to" 2. denotes habit or custom – "she belong to go shopping Fridays"
- Belving – load roaring/bellowing especially by a cow (similar to Bolving of stags on Exmoor)
- Berrin – funeral (burying)
- Better fit/better way – it would be better if...

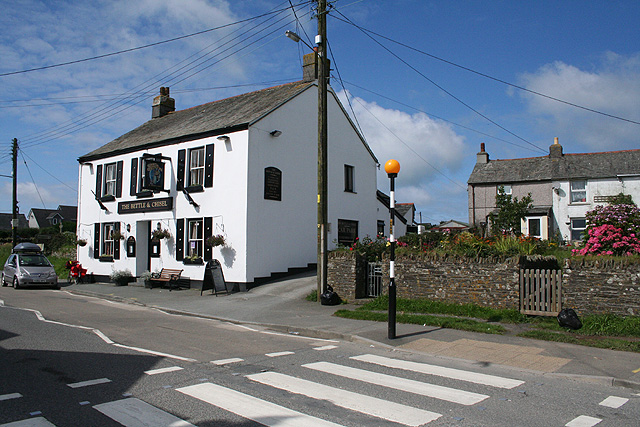
The Bettle and Chisel, Delabole

- Bettle – mallet
- Betwattled – confused, bewildered
- Big-pattern – a show-off, "big-pattern he is"
- Big-sea – rough sea / swell
- Bilders – cow parsley
- Bimper – a peeping tom
- Biskan – a finger-stall (in use after the year 1800, from Cornish language byskon, meaning 'thimble', or 'finger sheath')
- Bits – spinach-beet, green beet-leaves, Chard (in use after the year 1800, from Cornish language betys, meaning 'edible plants of the genus Beta')
- Black-Annie – a black backed gull
- Bladder – blister (part of mid Cornwall and north east Cornwall)
- Bleddy – local pronunciation of 'bloody' as an emphasising adjective (e.g. "dang the bleddy goat")
- Blowed – surprised "well I'm blowed"
- Bobber lip – bruised and swollen lip
- Brake – thicket / rough woodland
- Borbas – a rockling (Newlyn, Mousehole, in use after the year 1800, from Cornish language barvus, meaning 'bearded')
- Bothel – a blister (in use after the year 1800, from Cornish language bothel)
- Bothack – the bib, or pouting (Mousehole, in use after the year 1800, from Cornish language bothek, meaning 'bossed', or 'hunchback')
- Bothack – a hunchback (Mullion, in use after the year 1800, from Cornish language bothek)
- Boughten – bought (i.e. food from a shop rather than home-made)
- Bowjy – a cattle-house (in use after the year 1800, from Cornish language bowji)
- Brae / brer – quite a lot
- Brandis – trivet
- Brave – much/many (often pronounced with v not sounded or almost as m. see Brae above.)
- Breal – a mackerel (Newlyn, Mousehole, Porthleven, St Ives, in use after the year 1800, from Cornish language brithel)
- Brink – the gills of a fish (Mount's Bay, St Ives, in use after the year 1800, from Cornish language brynk)
- Brock – a badger, from (Cornish language brogh)
- Browjans – small fragments (in use after the year 1800, from Cornish language brewsyon, or brewjyon, meaning 'crumbs', 'fragments')
- Browse – undergrowth
- Browse – pulped bait (Mount's Bay, in use after the year 1800, from Cornish language brows, meaning 'crumbled material', or bros, 'thick broth')
- Broze – a blaze, a great heat (in use after the year 1800, from Cornish language bros, meaning 'extremely hot')
- Brummal Mow – an arish mow of domed form (in use after the year 1800, from Cornish language bern mool, meaning 'bald stack')
- Bruyans, Brewions – crumbs, fragments (in use after the year 1800, from Cornish language brewyon)
- Bucca – an imp, hobgoblin, scarecrow (in use after the year 1800, from Cornish language bocka)
- Buddy – a cluster, a clump (in use after the year 1800, from Cornish language bodas, meaning 'bunched', or boden, meaning 'a bunch', or 'a grouping', related to the Breton bodad and boden)
- Buffon – a bruise (in use after the year 1800, from Cornish language bothen, meaning 'a swelling')
- Buldering – threatening, thundery, sultry (of weather or the sky)
- Bulgranack – the smooth blenny (in use after the year 1800, from Cornish language poll gronek, meaning 'pool toad')
- Bulorn – a snail (in use after the year 1800, from Cornish language bulhorn, meaning 'snail'), related to Breton bigorn, a sea snail, or to Irish ballan, a shell)
- Bully – large pebble (from Cornish language bili, meaning 'pebbles')
- Bulugen – an earthworm (Mousehole, in use after the year 1800, from Cornish language buthugen)
- Bun-fight – the wake after a funeral
- Bunny (also written as "bunney" and "bonie") - a bunch of ore, an unusual concentration of ore (From Middle English bony, boni [“swelling, tumor”], from Old French bugne, buigne [“swelling, lump”], from Old Frankish *bungjo [“swelling, bump”], from Proto-Germanic *bungô, *bunkô [“lump, clump, heap, crowd”]. Usage perhaps influenced by Cornish language benygys, meaning 'blessed')
- Burd – (second person singular) bud as in "buddy"
- Burgam – a jocular term of reproach (Gwinear, in use after the year 1800, from Cornish language berrgamm, meaning 'crookshank')
- Burn – a load, as much turf, furze, etc., as one can carry; of hake or pollack, twenty-one fish. (in use after the year 1800, either from Cornish language bern, meaning 'a stack', 'a heap', or a variation of bourn ("limit"))
- Burrow – heap of (usually) mining related waste, but sometimes used simply to mean "pile"
- Buster – someone full of fun and mischief. (Originally a variant of "burster", but later influenced (and reanalysed) separately by/as "bust" + -er. The combining form of the term has appeared from the early 20th century but been especially prolific since the 1940s, owing to its appearance as military slang).
- Buzgut – a great eater or drinker ("buz" being derived from the Cornish language boos, meaning 'food')
- Buzza, Bussa – large salting pot or bread-bin, (still in use, from Cornish language boos seth, meaning 'food jar', or related to Breton boñs, a hogshead barrel) also found in phrase "dafter than a buzza" very daft
- B'y – boy, (second person singular) like sir

== C ==
- Cabby – sticky, dirty, muddy
- Cabester, Cobesta – the part of a fishing tackle connecting the hook with the lead (Mousehole, in use after the year 1800, from Cornish language kabester, meaning 'a halter', 'noose' or 'loop')
- Cabobble – to mystify, puzzle or confuse
- Caboolen, Cabooly-stone – a holed stone, tied to a rope, and used to drive pilchards or mackerel back from the opening of a seine (Mount's Bay, in use after the year 1800, from Cornish language kabolen, meaning 'a stirrer', 'a mixer')
- Cack – filth (in use after the year 1800, from Cornish language kawgh, meaning 'excrement')
- Caggle, Gaggle – to cover in filth (in use after the year 1800, from Cornish language kagla, meaning 'void excrement', 'spatter with filth)
- Cakey – soft, feeble minded (from 'put in with the cakes and taken out with the buns' - half baked)
- Cal – tungstate of iron (in use after the year 1800, from Cornish language kall)
- Calamajeena, Calavajina – a thornback (St Ives, in use after the year 1800, from Cornish language karleyth vejiner, meaning 'buckle/hinge ray')
- Calcar – the lesser weever (in use after the year 1800, from Cornish language kalker)
- Calken, Calican – the father-lasher (in use after the year 1800, from Cornish language kalken)
- Callan – a hard layer on the face of a rock (St Just, in use after the year 1800, from Cornish language kales, meaning 'hard', or kall, 'tungstate of iron')
- Cand, Cam – fluorspar (St Just, in use after the year 1800, from Cornish language kann, meaning 'brightness')
- Canker – a harbour crab (in use after the year 1800, from Cornish language kanker, meaning 'a crab')
- Cannikeeper – a spider crab (in use after the year 1800, from Cornish language kanker)
- Canter – a frame for a fishing-line, originally a peg was used (Newlyn, Mousehole, Sennen, in use after the year 1800, from Cornish language kenter, meaning 'a nail')
- Captain – the manager of a mine or similar enterprise
- Care – the mountain ash, or rowan (in use after the year 1800, from Cornish language kerdhin)
- Carn – a pile of rocks (used as a word and also as a place-name element, in use after the year 1800, from Cornish language karn)
- Carn tyer – quartz (in use after the year 1800, from Cornish language kannter, meaning 'bright whiteness', or kanndir, meaning 'bright white ground')
- Carrack – a stone composed of quartz, schorl and hornblende (in use after the year 1800, from Cornish language karrek, meaning 'a rock')
- Cassabully – winter cress (in use after the year 1800, from Cornish language kas beler, meaning 'nasty cress')
- Casteeg – to flog (in use after the year 1800, from Cornish language kastiga)
- Catched – caught
- Catchpit – a place in the home where everything is dropped
- Cauch – a mess (in use after the year 1800, see cack)
- Caunse – paved way (from Cornish language kons)
- Chacking – thirsty
- Chacks – cheeks
- Chaffering – haggling over a bargain
- Chea chaunter, Cheechonter – stop your chatter! (in use after the year 1800, from Cornish language ti tewelder, meaning 'swear silence')
- Cheel – child especially girl "a boy or a cheel"
- Cheldern – children
- Chewidden Thursday – a miners' festival (in use after the year 1800, from Cornish language dy'Yow gwynn, with Late Cornish gwydn, meaning 'white Thursday')
- Chill – lamp
- Chilth – chilliness of the atmosphere
- Chimley – chimney
- Chirks – remnants of fire, embers; "chirk" burrows where used coal was found near mines (from Cornish language towargh, via Late Cornish chowark, meaning 'peat or turf for burning')
- Chopper - someone from Redruth, usually how a Camborne native would describe someone from Redruth
- Chuggypig – woodlouse
- Churchtown – the settlement where the parish church is located
- Clacky – sticky and chewy food
- Clidgy – sticky, muddy
- Clim (up) – climb (everywhere except west of Camborne and Helston)

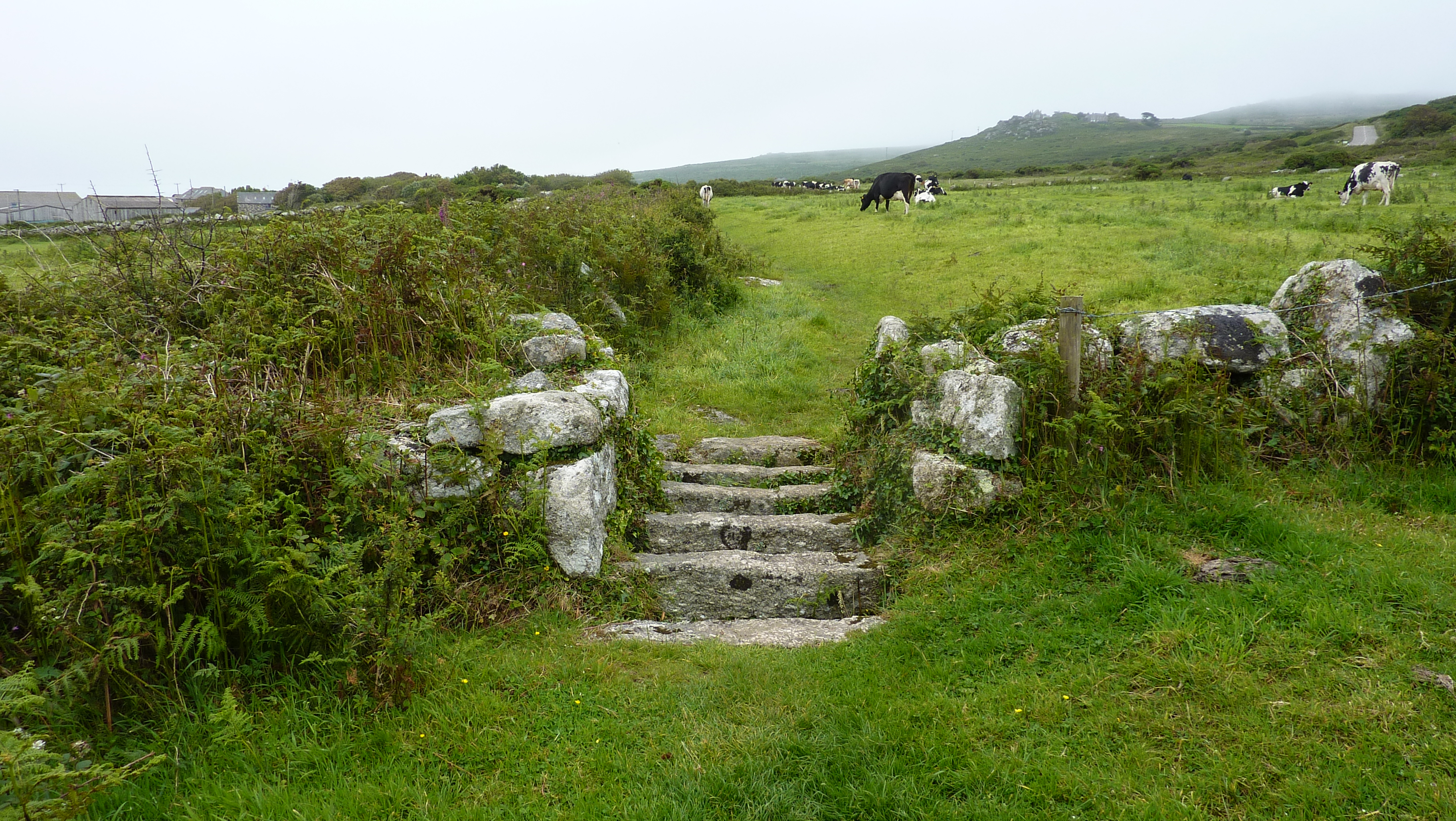
A coffen stile at Tremedda Farm

- Clip – sharp in speaking, curt, having taken offence
- Cloam – crockery, pottery, earthenware
- Cloam oven – earthenware built-in oven
- Clunk – swallow; clunker – windpipe
- Coffen stile – a coffen (or coffin) stile is a type of stile consisting of rectangular bars of granite laid side by side with gaps between (usually to stop livestock from straying)

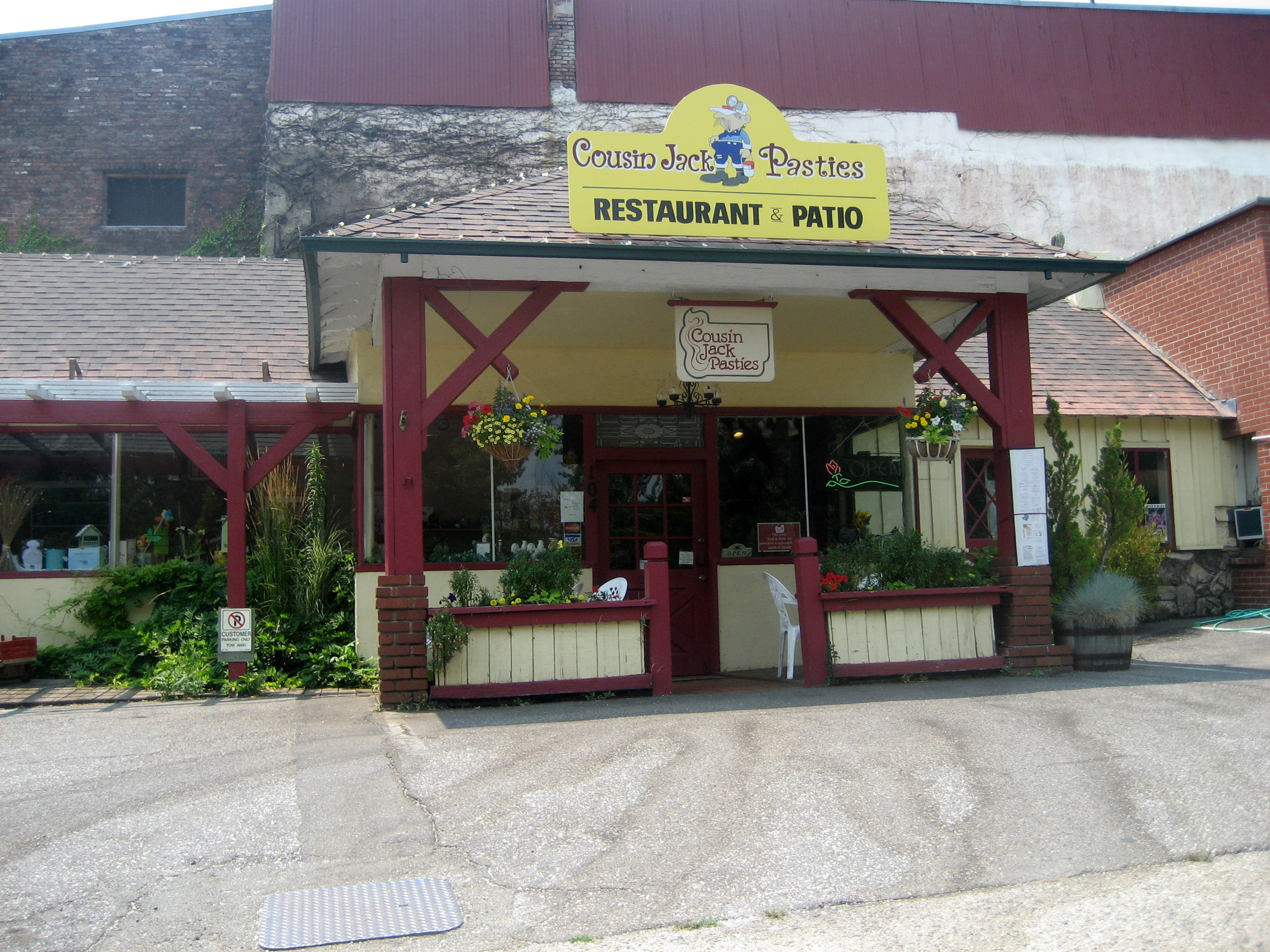
A "Cousin Jack's" pasty shop in Grass Valley, California

- Condiddle, Kindiddle – to entice, take away clandestinely
- Confloption – flurry or confusion)
- Coose – to hunt or chase game out of woodland/covert, from the Cornish word for woodland 'koes'. I.e. a command given to encourage a hunting dog "coose him out then dog!".
- Cornish diamonds – quartz
- Corrosy – an old grudge handed down from father to son; an annoyance
- Cousin Jack – a Cornish emigrant miner; "Cousin Jacks" is a nickname for the overseas Cornish, thought to derive from the practice of Cornishmen asking if job vacancies could be filled by their cousin named Jack in Cornwall.
- Cramble – to walk with difficulty
- Crease – children's truce term (west Cornwall) (from the Cornish word for "peace")
- Crib – a mid-morning break for a snack (see below also)
- Croust (or Crowst) – a mid-morning break for a snack (usually west Cornwall) (from Cornish language croust)
- Cummas 'zon – come on, hurry up
- Cundard – a drain
- Cuss – curse
- Cutting of it up – speaking in a fake posh accent

== D ==
- Daft – silly
- Dag – short hatchet or axe (miner's dag); also in phrase "Face like a dag"; sheep tailings
- Dappered – dirty / covered in mud
- Dashel – thistle
- Denner – dinner, evening meal
- Devoner – someone from Devon (used in a derogatory sense)

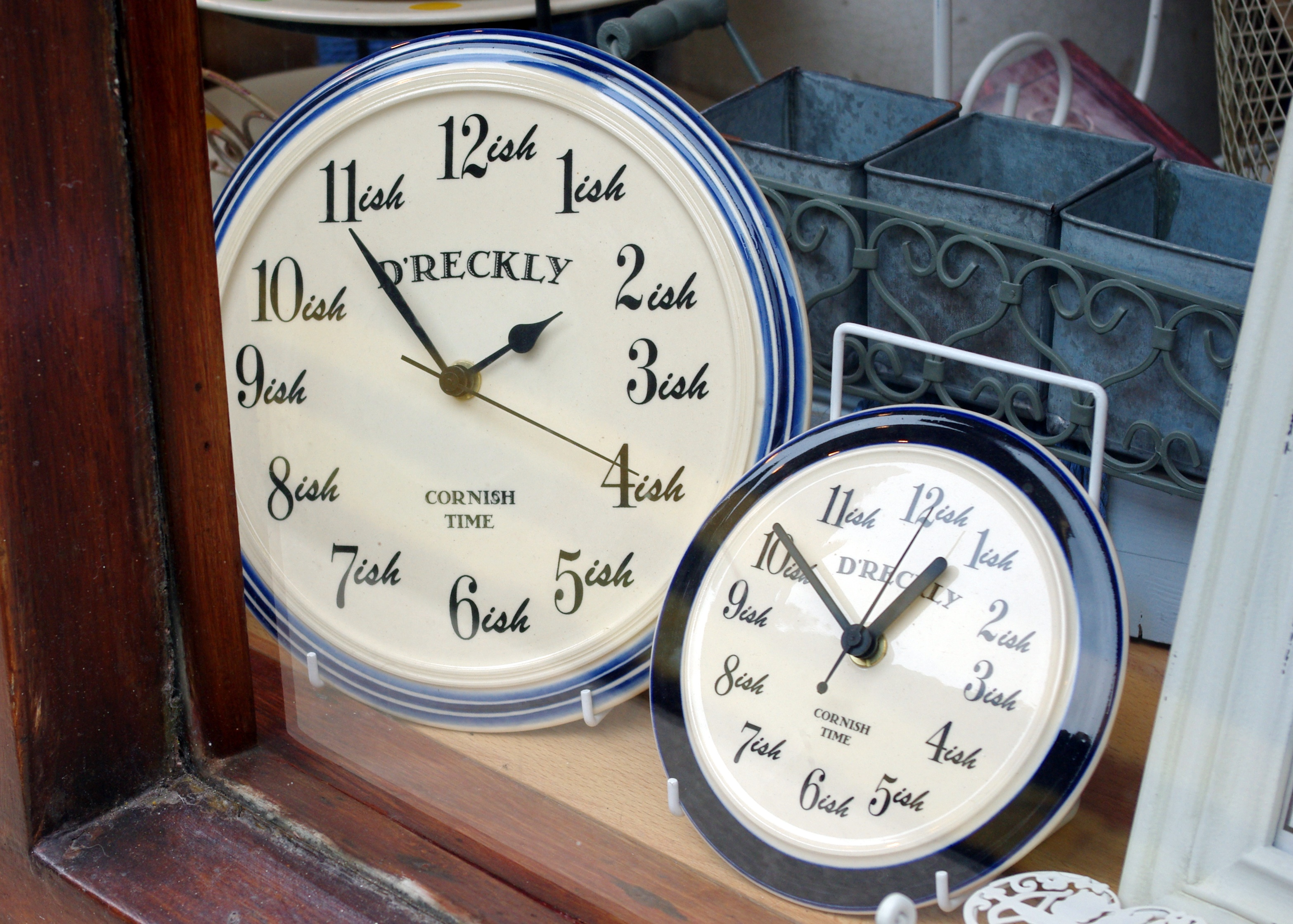
"Dreckly" on souvenir clocks in Cornwall

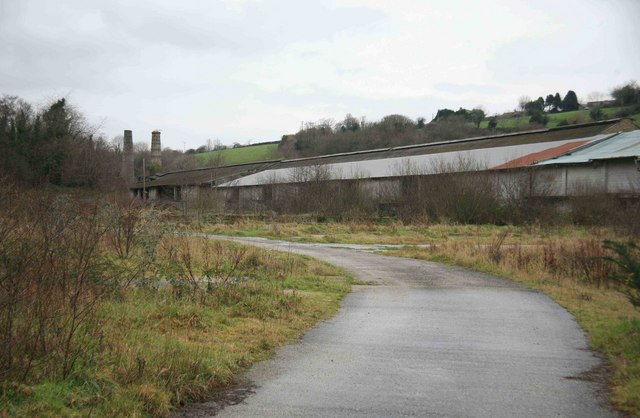
Wenford Dries

- Didikoy – gypsy (mid and east Cornwall)
- Didnus – Didn't we
- Dilley – wheeled play trolley made from wood and pram wheels
- Dishwasher – water-wagtail
- Do – auxiliary verb – "the pasties mother do make" or even "that's what we d' do"
- Dobeck – somebody stupid ("great dobeck")
- Dram – swath
- Drang – narrow passage or lane
- Drash – thresh; "drasher" = thresher
- Dreckley / Dreckly – at some point in the future; soon, but not immediately; like "mañana", but less urgent
- Dreckzel – threshold of a doorway
- Dry (china clay) – a dry is where the sludge gets processed (e.g. Wenford Dries)
- Dryth – drying power, "There's no dryth in the wind today"
- Dummity – low light level, overcast
- Durns – door frame
- Dwam – a swoon, faint or sudden feeling of faintness

== E ==
- 'e – contraction of "he" but used in place of "it"
- Easy – slightly simple mentally
- Ee – contraction of thee
- Eeval – farmer's fork implement
- Emmet – ant or more recently tourist (mildly derogatory); four-legged emmet (mid-Cornwall) - newt
- Ellen – a slate that has fallen from a roof (St. Ives)
- 'er – she (East Cornwall)
- Ess – yes (see also, "Ayes", above)
- Ess coss – yes of course
- Ewe (cat) – she cat (mid and west Cornwall)
- Exactly – as in "'e edn exactly", meaning he is not right mentally

== F ==
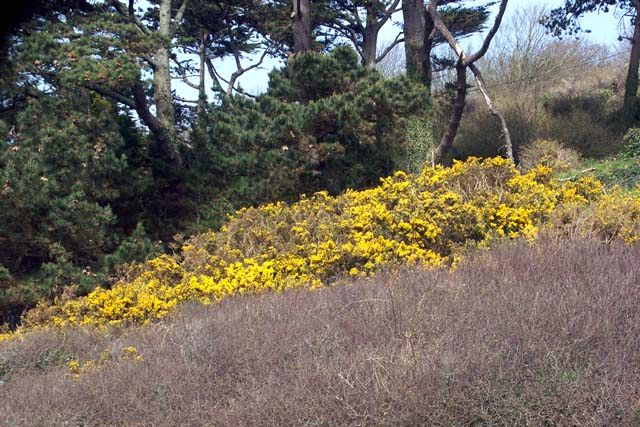
Gorse-covered hillside

- Fains – children's truce term (east Cornwall)
- Fall – autumn, Fall (south of a line from Mount's Bay to Launceston)
- Ferns – bracken "the hounds lost the fox in the ferns"
- Figgy hobbin – lump of dough, cooked with a handful of raisins (raisins being "figs" and figs "broad raisins")
- Fitty – proper, properly
- Fizzogg – face (colloquial form of "physiognomy")
- Flam-new – brand new (from Cornish language flamm nowydh)
- Fly, Flies – hands of a dial or clock
- Folks – people (mid and east Cornwall)
- Fossick – to search for something by rummaging, to prospect for minerals (in use after the year 1800, from Cornish language feusik, meaning 'lucky' or 'fortunate')
- Fradge – repair
- Fuggan – pastry dinner-cake
- Furze, furzy – gorse, covered with gorse, as in the local saying at Stratton "Stratton was a market town when Bude was just a furzy down", meaning Stratton was long established when Bude was just gorse-covered downland. (A similar saying is current at Saltash about Plymouth.)

== G ==
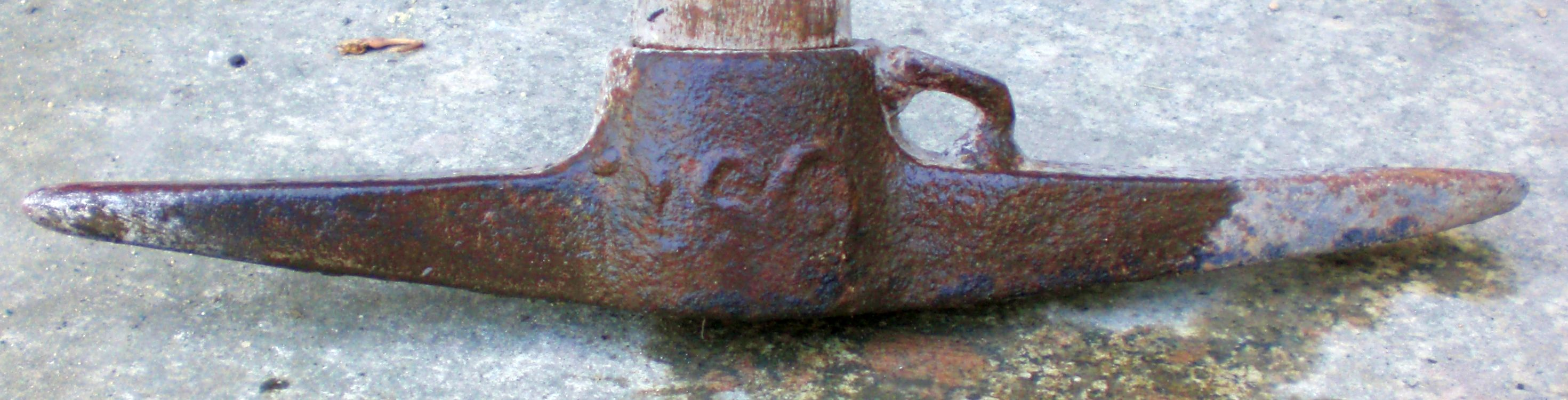
A miner's pick

Bal maidens wearing gooks, 1890

- Gad – a pick, especially a miner's pick; this kind of pick is a small pointed chisel used with a hammer, e.g. a hammer and gad
- Gashly – terrible, dismal, hideous (a form of ghastly)
- Gawky – stupid; from the Cornish language "gocki" (stupid)
- Gazooly, Gazol – gazoolying / gazoling means "to be constantly uttering laments"
- Geeking – gaping
- Geddon – good show / well done (cf. get on!)
- Girt licker – very large object, as in "That fish you caught is a girt licker"
- Giss on! – don't talk rubbish!
- Glance – bounce (describing a ball) (mid and east Cornwall)
- Gook – bonnet
- Gossan – (in mining) a term for the loose mixture of quartz, iron oxide and other minerals often found on the "back" of a lode; decomposed rock
- Grammersow – woodlouse
- Granfer – grandfather
- Griglans – heather
- Grisly, Grizzly – a grating used to catch and throw out large stones from the sluices (still in use in mining industry worldwide, from Cornish language grysla, meaning 'to grin', 'to show one's teeth')
- Growan - 'decomposed granite' (from grow 'gravel')
- Grushans, Groushans – dregs, especially in bottom of tea cup
- Guag, Gwag – emptiness, hollow space in a mine (in use after the year 1800, from Cornish language gwag, meaning 'empty')
- Gug – a coastal feature/cave, esp. North Cornwall; e.g St Illickswell Gug
- Gunnis – an underground excavation left where a lode has been worked out
- Gurgoe – warren
- Gwidgee-gwee – a blister, often caused by a misdirected hammer blow

== H ==
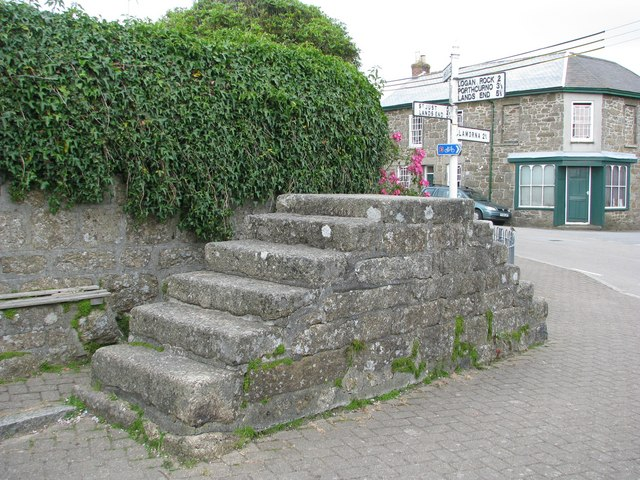
A mounting block at St Buryan

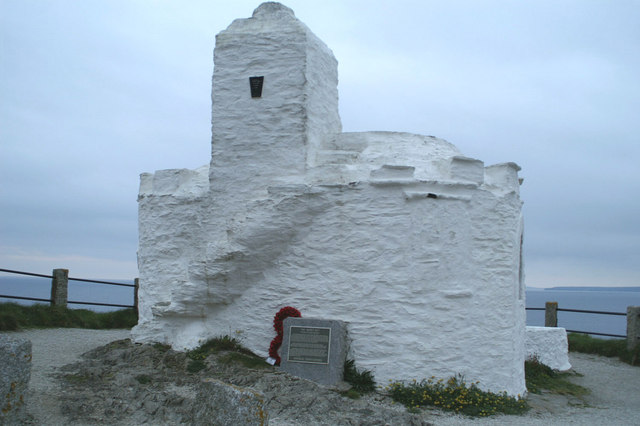
The Huer's Hut overlooking Newquay Bay

- Haggel – hawthorn berries
- Hav – summer (hair+v)
- Havage, Haveage – race, lineage or family stock
- Hawn – haven, harbour
- Heave – throw (mid Cornwall)
- Hell-of-a-good – very good!
- Hell-of-a-job – a difficult job!
- Heller – troublesome child
- Hellup - there was/ is going to be trouble/ at least a fuss (Wait til denzil finds out, ‘twill be hellup!)
- Henting – raining hard ("ee's henting out there")
- Hepping stock – mounting block
- Hoggan – pastry cake
- Hoggans – haws
- Holing – working, mining (from Cornish language hwel, meaning 'a mine working') used in phrase "holing in guag", meaning mining somewhere that has already been mined.
- Huer – a lookout on land assisting fishermen by shouted directions

== J ==
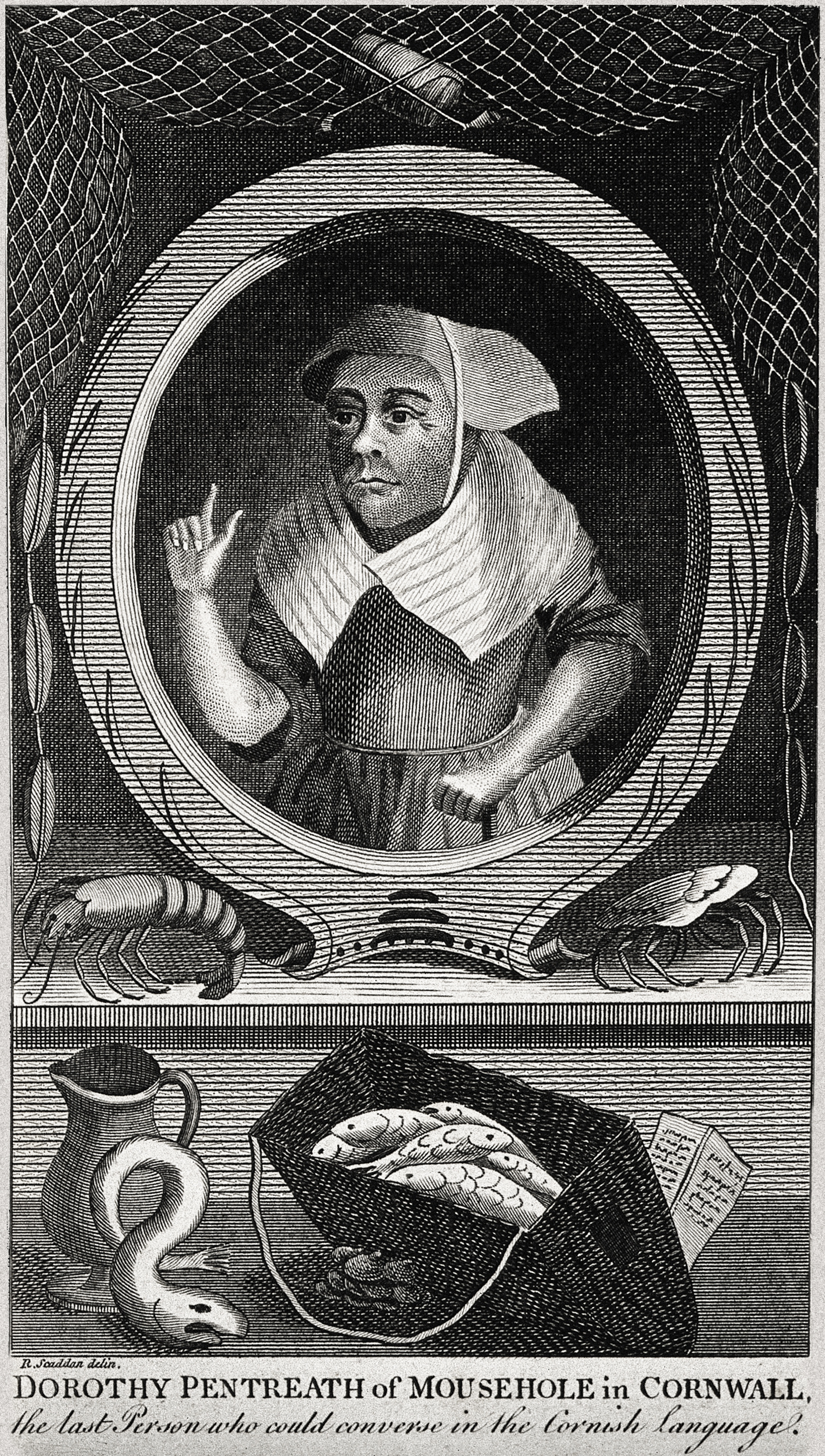
Dolly Pentreath (a fish jowster), in an engraved portrait published in 1781

- Jacker – Cornish man, mainly used by non-Cornish to refer to Cornish, especially used around the dockyards
- Jackteeth / Jawteeth – molars; "jackteeth" is used in the north east, "jawteeth" in the southeast and mid Cornwall, but "grinders" in the west.
- Jamien – a hero, legend, honourable person
- Janner – Devon man (Plymouth especially)
- Janjansy – a two-faced person
- Jowse – shake or rattle
- Jowster – itinerant seller, e.g. "fish jowster"

== K ==
- Kennal - the open water drainage gully between road and pavement
- Kewny – rancid
- Kibbal – iron container used for ore and rock haulage
- Kiddlywink – unlicensed beer shop
- Kieve – wooden tub, mainly used in mineral processing
- Killas – (in mining) metamorphic rock strata of sedimentary origin which were altered by heat from the intruded granites in Devon and Cornwall.
- Knack-kneed – knock-kneed
- Knockers – spirits that dwell underground

== L ==
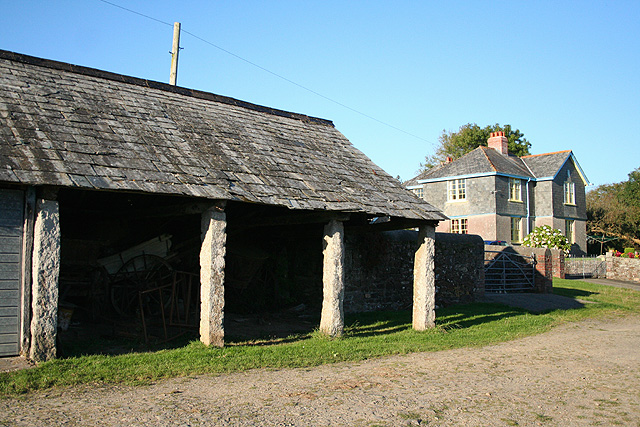
Linhay at Higher Troswell

- Lathered – drunk
- Larrups – rags, shreds, bits
- Launder – guttering, originally a trough in tin mining (from Cornish language londer)
- Lawn – a field
- Leaking wet – very wet
- Learn – teach (from Cornish language dyski which means both 'to learn' and 'to teach', similar to French apprendre)
- Leary, Leery – hungry, empty, faint and exhausted from hunger
- Lennock – limp, flabby; pliant, flexible; pendulous
- Lewth – shelter, protection from the wind
- Lewvordh - starboard (right hand side of a boat when looking from the stern to the bow)
- Linhay – lean-to (of a building)
- Long-spoon – term to mean a tight-fisted person, i.e. you'd need a long-spoon to share soup with them!
- Longfellas – implements with long handles
- Looby – warm, muggy, misty (of the weather)
- Louster – to work hard
- Lowance out – to set limits financially (from "allowance")

== M ==
- Made, Matey, Meh'd – mate
- Maid – girl, girl-friend (see also Bal maiden; Wheal Maid)
- Maund – large basket
- Mazed – greatly bewildered, downright mad, angry
- Meader – unknown; used in the 'Poldark' novels apparently of a weakling or runt of a litter
- Merrymaid – mermaid
- Mert - originated as a term of respect for a skilled person or someone in authority; typically just used as a friendly way to address someone, usually male
- Milky-dashel – milk thistle
- Mim – prim, demure; prudish
- Minching – skiving "minching off school"
- Mind – remember
- Month – a particular month is referred to with "month" added to its name, e.g. May month
- Mossil – mid morning snack (used by St Just miners), similar to croust/crib
- Mowhay – barn, hay store, stackyard
- Murrian, Muryan – (Cornish) ant or more recently a tourist (mainly west Cornwall) (cp. Emmet) (from Cornish language moryon)
- Mutt – sulk

== N ==
- Nestle-bird, nestle-drish (East Cornwall) – the weakest pig of a litter
- Nick – onomatopoeic, tap – as in "'e go nick nick" i.e. it keeps tapping
- Nickety-knock – palpitations
- Niff – a silent, sullen feeling of resentment; a quarrel
- Nip – narrow path or short steep rise
- Noggle – to manage anything with difficulty, especially to walk with difficulty
- Nought but – Nothing more than, as in "nought but a child" (east Cornwall)

== O ==
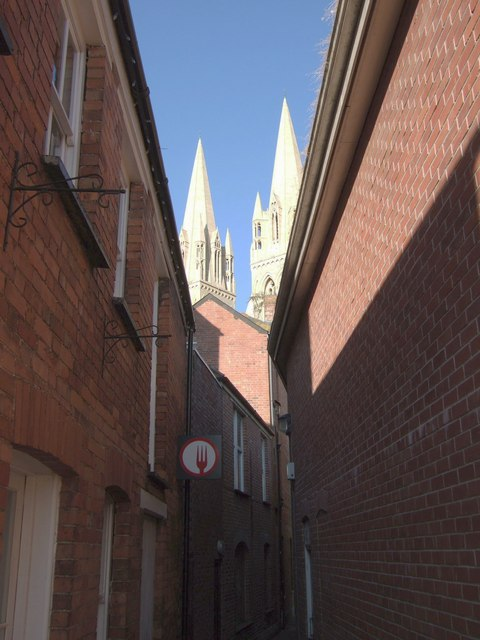
Tonkin's Ope, Truro

- Oggy – pasty (from Cornish language hogen)
- Ope – an alley (between buildings)
- Oss – horse

== P ==
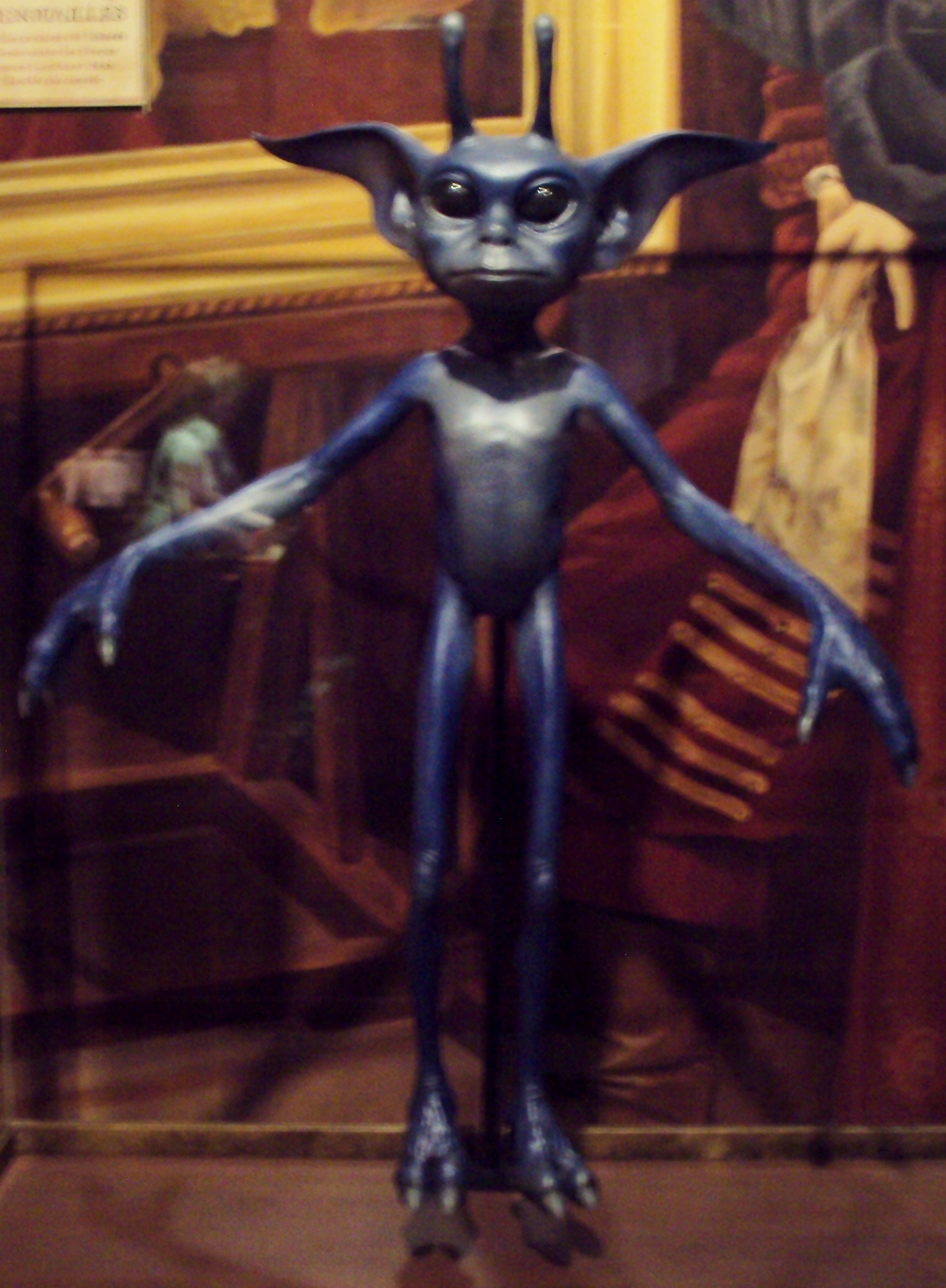
A Cornish pisky

- Padgypaw, Padgy-pow (West Cornwall) – a newt (from Cornish language pajarpaw)
- Palm – the pussy willow, branches of which were traditionally used as substitutes for the palm or olives branches on Palm Sunday
- Paps - grandfather
- Pard – friend ("partner")
- Party – a young woman
- Parwhobble – a conference (as a noun); to talk continuously so as to dominate the conversation (as a verb)
- Peeth – well (for supplying water)
- Perjinkety – apt to take offence
- Piffer – porpoise (from Cornish language pyffer)
- Piggal – turf cutting tool
- Piggy-whidden (West Cornwall) – the runt of a litter of pigs
- Pig's-crow – pigsty
- Pike – pitchfork
- Pilez, Pillas – Avena nuda (formerly used as a substitute for oatmeal and for fattening calves)
- Pilth – small balls found in over-rubbed cotton
- Pindy or Peendy – tainted usually of foodstuffs going off or rancid, especially by sense of smell 'this meat is pindy'
- Pisky – pixie
- Planching/Planchen – a wooden or planked floor
- Platt – market place (e.g. The Platt at Wadebridge, or The Townplatt at Port Isaac)
- Pluffy – fat, swollen, chubby; soft, porous, spongy
- Pokemon (also recorded with spelling variant Pokemen) – clumsy, stupid.
- Polrumptious – restive, rude, obstreperous, uproarious
- Preedy – easily, creditably
- Prong – fork (such as a hay fork, garden fork, &c.)
- Proper – satisfactory; "proper job"; "Proper Job IPA" is a St Austell ale
- Pussivanting – an ineffective bustle (also found in Devon)

== Q ==
- Quiddle – to make a fuss over trifles
- Quignogs – ridiculous notions or conceits
- Quilkin – frog (from Cornish language kwilkyn)
- Quillet – small plot of land (for cultivation)
- Quob, Quobmire – a marshy spot, bog or quagmire

== R ==
- Rab – gravel
- Randivoose – a noise or uproar
- Redders – (adjective) feeling physically hot, either from the weather or from exertion
- Right on – an informal way of saying goodbye, or response to greeting "Alright then?"
- Roar – weep loudly
- Ronkle – to fester, be inflamed
- Row-hound - a dogfish (from ‘rough’ as in skin texture and ‘hound’)
- Rumped (up) – huddled up, usually from the cold; phrase "rumped up like a winnard"

== S ==
- Sandsow (pron. zanzow) – woodlouse
- Scat – to hit or break "scat abroad = smashed up" (e.g. "mind and not scat abroad the cloam"); musical beat ('e's two scats behind); "bal scat" is a disused mine (from Cornish language skattra). Also financial ruin "he went scat/his business went scat".
- Scaw – elder tree
- Sclum, Sklum – to scratch as a cat, or like a cat
- Scovy, Scawvey, Skovey – uneven in colour, blotched, streaky, mottled or smeary
- Screech – to cry loudly
- Scrink, Skrink – to wrinkle, screw up (e.g. of half-closed eyes)
- Scroach – scorch
- Scrowl – to grill over the fire on an iron plate (e.g. scrowled pilchards)
- Shag - friend, mate
- Shalligonaked – flimsy, light or scanty (of clothing)
- Shippen – farm building for livestock. From Middle English schipne, Middle English schepne, schüpene, from Old English scypen (“cow-shed, stall, shippen”), from Proto-Germanic *skupīnō (“stall”), diminutive of *skup- (“shed, barn”). Related to shop.
- Shram – chill (as in "shrammed as a winnard")
- Slab – a Cornish range
- Slawterpooch – a slovenly, ungainly person
- Slock – to coax, entice or tempt, as in "slock 'un 'round"
- Small coal / slack – coal dust; "slack" only in the far south west
- Smeech – acrid smoke (also used as a verb 'to smeech'), and also used as the verb in west Cornwall for misty rain, as "its smeeching".
- Smuts – soot
- Snib - Slang word for “Penis”, most common in South East Cornwall
- Some – very, extremely (as in "'e d' look some wisht", "'tis some hot today")
- Sowpig – woodlouse
- Spence – larder in house; "crowded = House full, spence full"

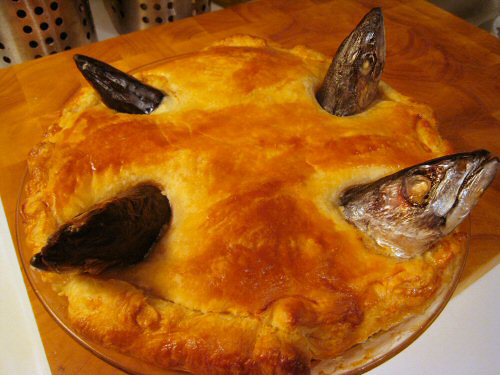
Stargazy pie

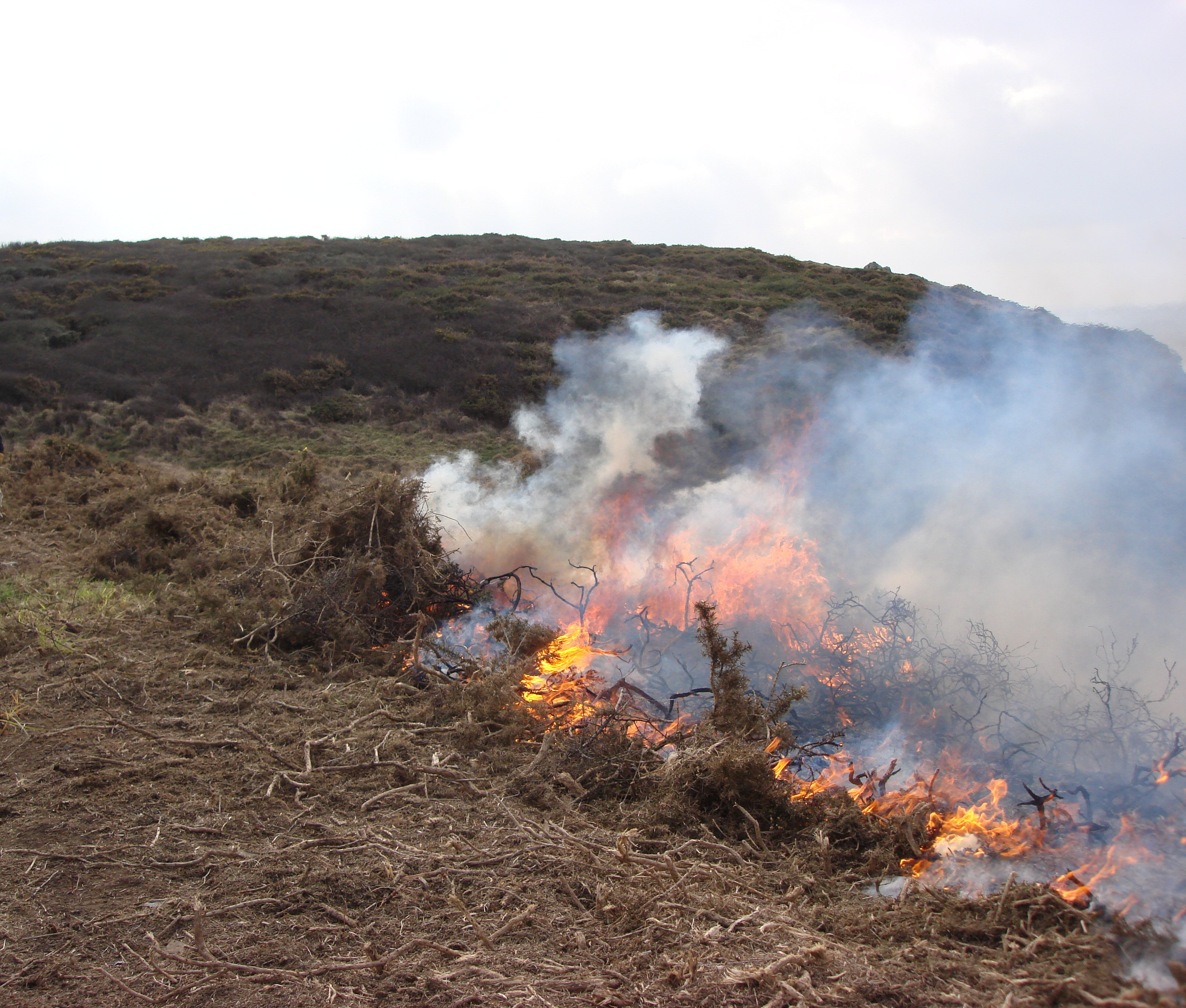
Swaling

- Splatt – a patch of grass
- Split - a Cornish bread roll, traditionally used for a cream tea, topped with jam then cream
- Spriggan – spirit
- Sproil – energy
- Squall – to cry
- Squallass, squallyass – crybaby
- Stagged – muddy
- Stank – to walk, also a word for a long walk as in "that was a fair old stank" (from Cornish language stankya)
- Stargazy pie / starry gazy pie – a pilchard pie with the fish heads uppermost
- Steen – stoneware pot
- Steeved – frozen
- Stinking – a very bad cold/flu, i.e. "I have a stinking cold"
- Stog, Stug – to stick fast in mud
- Strike up / strike sound – start singing, especially with traditional spontaneous a capella Cornish pub singing
- Stripped up – dressed appropriately
- Stroyl – couch grass (from Cornish language stroylek 'messy')
- Stuggy – broad and sturdy (of a person's build)
- Suant – smooth, even or regular
- Swale – to burn (moorland vegetation) to bring on new growth

== T ==
- Tacker – small child, toddler
- Teal – to till, cultivate (e.g. 'tealing teddies'; according to folklore Good Friday is the best day in the year to do this)
- Teasy – bad-tempered as in 'teasy as a fitcher' or a childhood tantrum may be explained as the child being 'tired and teasy' (from Cornish language tesek)
- Teddy / tiddy – potato
- Thirl – hungry
- Thunder and lightning - clotted cream and syrup, often on a split
- Tidden – tender (from "tydn" Cornish language painful)
- Tight – drunk
- Timdoodle – a stupid, silly fellow
- To – at; e.g. ""over to Cury" (at [the parish] of Cury) Also "Where is it?" could be phrased as "Where's he/her/it to?" and "Where's that" as "Where's that to" (compare usage in the Bristolian dialect).
- Tob – a piece of turf
- Towan – sandhill or dune (from Cornish language tewyn)
- Town Crow – a term used by Port Isaacers to describe Padstonians, (see also the counter-term Yarnigoat).
- Towser – a piece of material worn by agricultural workers and tied around the waist to protect the front of trousers, often made from a hessian potato sack
- Toze – distentangle, pull asunder
- Trade – stuff of doubtful value: "that shop, 'e's full of old trade"
- Tuppence-ha'penny – a bit of a simpleton / not the full shilling, i.e. "she's a bit Tuppence-Ha'penny"
- Turmut – turnip; or commonly swede (a Cornish pasty is often made of "turmut, 'tates and mate" i.e. swede, potato and meat)
- Tuss – a rude name for an obnoxious person.

== U ==
- Ummin – dirty, filthy. As in 'the bleddy floor is ummin'.
- Un – him/her (used in place of "it" accusative)
- Upcountry – a generalised geographical term meaning anywhere which is in England, except for Cornwall and the Isles of Scilly. (Also, "up the line" or "upward")
- Urts – whortleberries, bilberries
- Us two / We two – As in 'there are just we two'; "Us two" is used only in north east Cornwall and "we two" in the rest of Cornwall.

== V ==
- Veer – sucking pig
- Vellan – villain
- Visgy – mattock
- Vor – furrow, as in a planted field
- Vug – rock cavity

== W ==
- Wab – the tongue; usually in "hold your wab!"
- Want – a mole (rhymes with pant). Want hill – a mole hill
- Wasson – what's going on?
- We be – as in 'Oh yes, we be!'; used in most of mid and east Cornwall, whereas "we are" is used in the far west.
- Weem - a collective term usually meaning ‘us’ or a shortened version of ‘we are’ (Weem going pub dreckly)
- Wheal – often incorrectly attributed to meaning a mine, but actually means a place of work; the names of most Cornish mines are prefixed with Wheal, such as Wheal Jane and Wheal Butson.
- Whidden – weakling (of a litter of pigs)
- Whiffy – changeable)
- Whimmy – full of whims, fanciful, changeable)
- Whitneck – weasel
- Wilky (Quilkin) – a frog (from Cornish language kwilkyn)
- Winnard – redwing; see also Winnard's Perch
- Withys – willow trees
- Withy-garden – area of coppiced willows cultivated by fishermen for pot making
- Wisht – hard-done-by, weak, faint, pale, sad; e.g. "You're looking wisht today" see Winnard above for the saying "as wisht as a winnard"
- Wo / ho – stop (when calling horses) ("ho" between a line from Crantock to St Austell and a line from Hayle to the Helford River; "way" in the northeast)

== Y ==
- Yarnigoat – term used by Padstonians to describe Port Isaacers. Due to the exposure of Port Isaac to the weather, the fishermen often could not put to sea and would instead congregate on the Platt to converse / tell yarns (See also, Town Crow)
- You / yo – as an emphatic end to a sentence, e.g. "Who's that, you?"; "Drag in the cheeld, you! and don't 'ee lev un go foorth till 'ee 's gone"

== Z ==
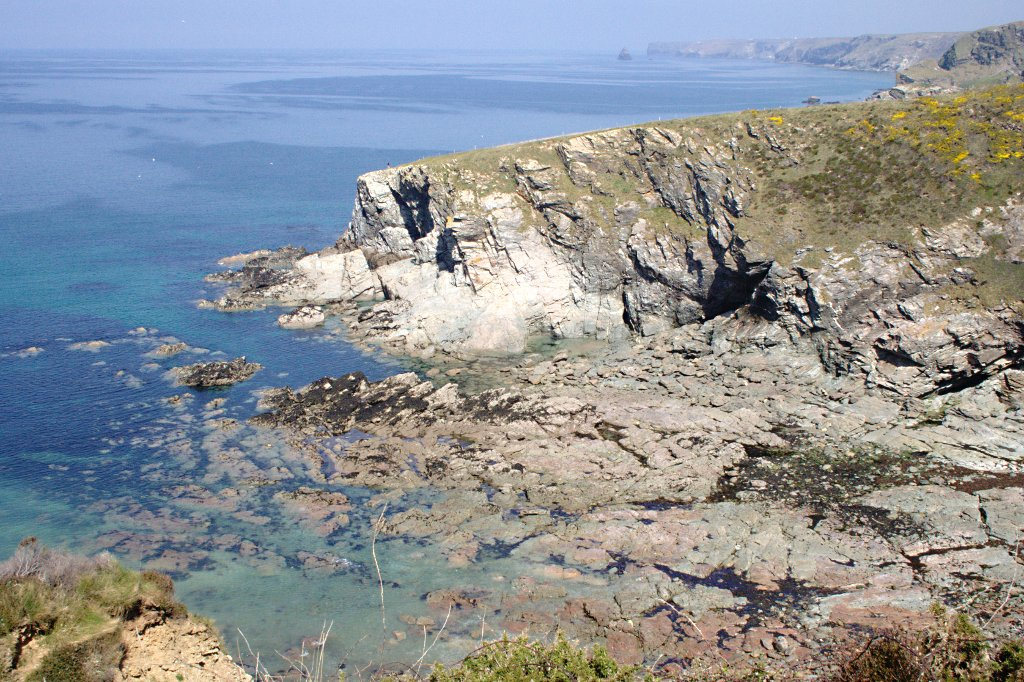
Barrett's Zawn on the north Cornish coast

- Zackley – exactly
- Zam-zoodled – half cooked or over cooked
- Zart – a sea urchin (in use after the year 1800, from Cornish language sort, meaning a sea urchin, or hedgehog)
- Zawn – a fissure in a cliff (used as a word and also as a place-name element, in use after the year 1800, from Cornish language sawen, or saven, meaning a cleft or gully) These fissures are known to geologists as littoral chasms.
- Zether – gannet
- Zew – to work alongside a lode, before breaking it down (in use after the year 1800, from Cornish language sewen,, meaning prosperous, successful)
- Zuggans – the essence of anything (in use after the year 1800, from Cornish language sugen, meaning juice, sap, syrup, essence)

== See also ==
- Cornish dialect
- Cornish language
- Old Cornish units of measurement
