= Hoggan =

Cornish type of bread

A hoggan or hogen is a type of flatbread containing pieces of pork, and often root vegetables, apple also becoming a popular addition, historically eaten by Cornish miners and labours in the eighteenth and nineteenth centuries. Any food eaten by miners had to be tough to withstand the harsh conditions of the mines, and hoggans were said by one mining captain to be 'hard as street tiles'.

A true hoggan is slightly different from a pasty. The dough which was left over from pasty making is made into a lump of unleavened dough, in which is embedded a morsel of "green" (uncooked) pork and sometimes a piece of potato. Historically, hoggans were often made from cheaper barley bread and have been a good indicator of poverty, reappearing when wheat prices are high.

The pasty became particularly popular in Devonport and Plymouth, where sailors called them "tiddly oggies" (also referred to as Tiddy Oggies or a Tiddy Oggy). Tiddly in naval slang means ‘proper’, a common adjective and adverb used by Cornish people, and oggie was the term for a pastie in cornwall, so "tiddly oggie" meant proper pasty.

A sweet version made of flour and raisins is known as a fuggan or figgy hobbin. Fig is a Cornish dialect word pertaining to raisins.

A Hobban, or Hoggan-bag, was the name given to miners' dinner-bag.

== See also ==
- Oggy Oggy Oggy
