= U-S-A! =

American patriotic chant

"U-S-A!" is a chant of the United States of America's initials, popular in expressing American pride. It is often used at political demonstrations, sports events, holiday celebrations such as Independence Day, and other community events both in the United States and overseas among American diaspora and tourists. First documented in 1918 at a Bethlehem Steel plant in Lebanon, Pennsylvania, the chant is perceived as both a powerful display of American unity and love of the country.

== Sports ==
The film Olympia: Festival of Nations, documenting the 1936 Summer Olympics in Berlin, includes the chant during the finals of the 1,500 meter event and the long jump. It was also documented at the 1972 Summer Olympics in Munich, during the basketball tournament final between the United States and the Soviet Union. In October 1979, the chant was used in Budapest when the national men's teams of Hungary and the United States played soccer against each other.

The chant was popularized in the context of the 1980 Olympic ice hockey tournament. During the U.S.' 7–3 win over Czechoslovakia in the second game, the crowd began chanting "U-S-A! U-S-A!" in support of the U.S. ice hockey team as the Americans scored a decisive win over one of the best teams in the world. The chant became a fixture of the team's remaining games and gained national attention after the U.S. defeated the heavily favored Soviet Union professionals in what became known as the "Miracle on Ice", later moving on to beat Finland for the gold medal.

During the 2021 Ryder Cup, American professional golfer, Justin Thomas led the crowd on the first tee into USA chants, using handheld American flags to prompt the crowd.

== Professional wrestling ==
In professional wrestling, "Hacksaw" Jim Duggan was popularly known for making the cheer during his wrestling matches and inciting the crowd to repeat it after him. The chant has also been used by fans to taunt characters who dislike the U.S., such as Canadian star Bret Hart, who was beloved in the U.S. but turned his back on the country during an infamous 1997 storyline; the Bulgarian-born Rusev, who was portrayed as hailing from Russia and pledged his allegiance to Russia and its president Vladimir Putin throughout 2014–2015, all while bashing the U.S. alongside his manager Lana; and Kevin Owens, who, after capturing the United States Championship, proclaimed himself as "The Face of America" despite constantly lambasting the U.S. in favor of Canada. It has also been used to support wrestlers with pro-U.S. gimmicks, like Hulk Hogan, regardless of the nationality of their opponents.

== Politics ==
In May 1969, it was used in Plzeň, Czechoslovakia to commemorate the city's liberation by American and Polish forces at the end of World War II. During the 1984 United States presidential election, the chant was heard at numerous campaign rallies for incumbent President Ronald Reagan; it was also heard at events throughout his presidency, including a visit to Port Washington, Wisconsin.

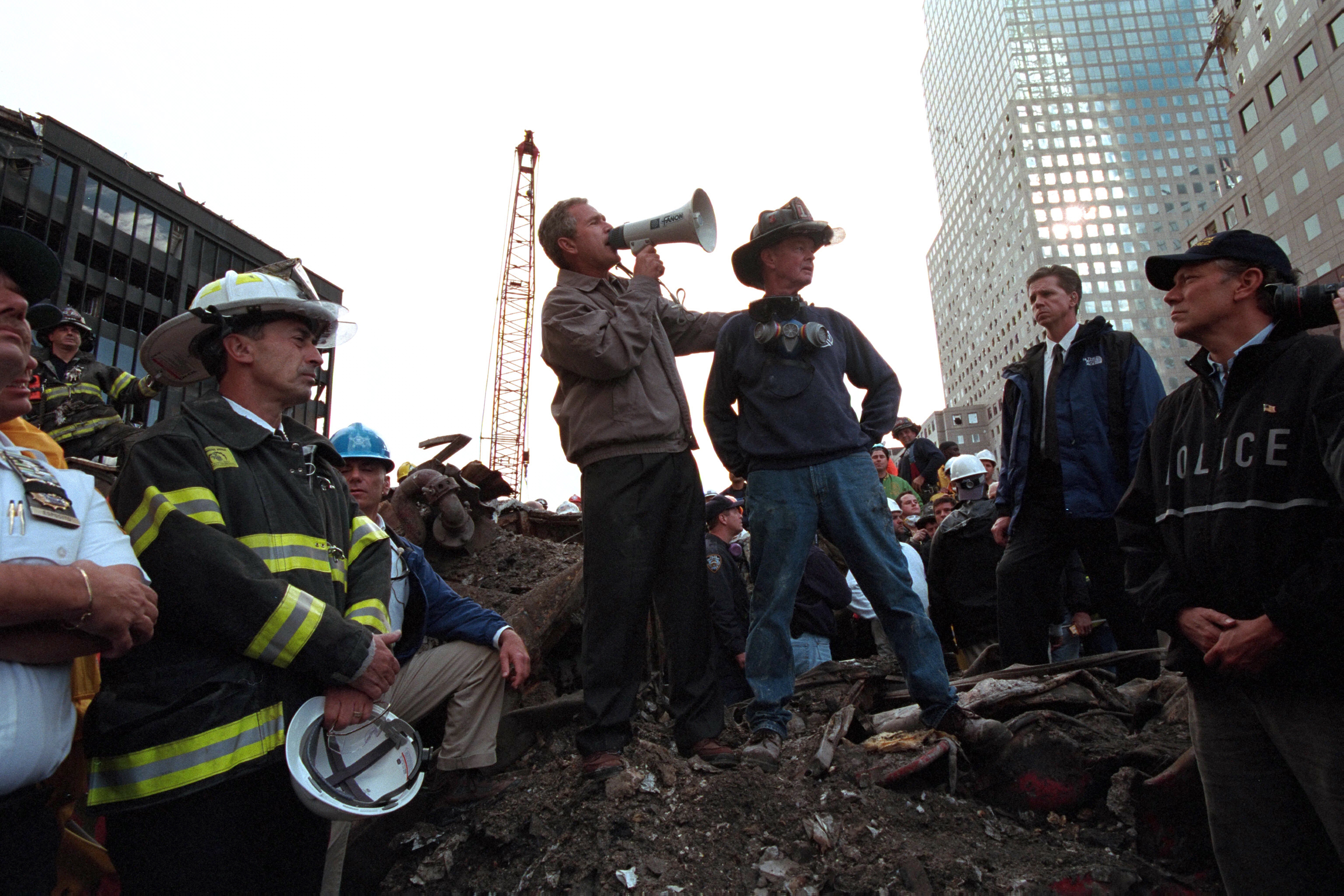
Original caption of this photograph read: "Standing upon the ashes of the worst terrorist attack on American soil, Sept. 14, 2001, President Bush pledges that the voices calling for justice from across the country will be heard. Responding to the Presidents' [sic] words, rescue workers cheer and chant, "U.S.A, U.S.A."

The September 11 attacks of 2001 found a revival in the chant during patriotic ceremonies at sporting events; the chant was also heard when U.S. President George W. Bush visited the ruins at the World Trade Center site in the week following the 2001 attacks. Following the throwing of the first pitch during the 2001 World Series, the crowd chanted "U-S-A", when the pitch was a strike.

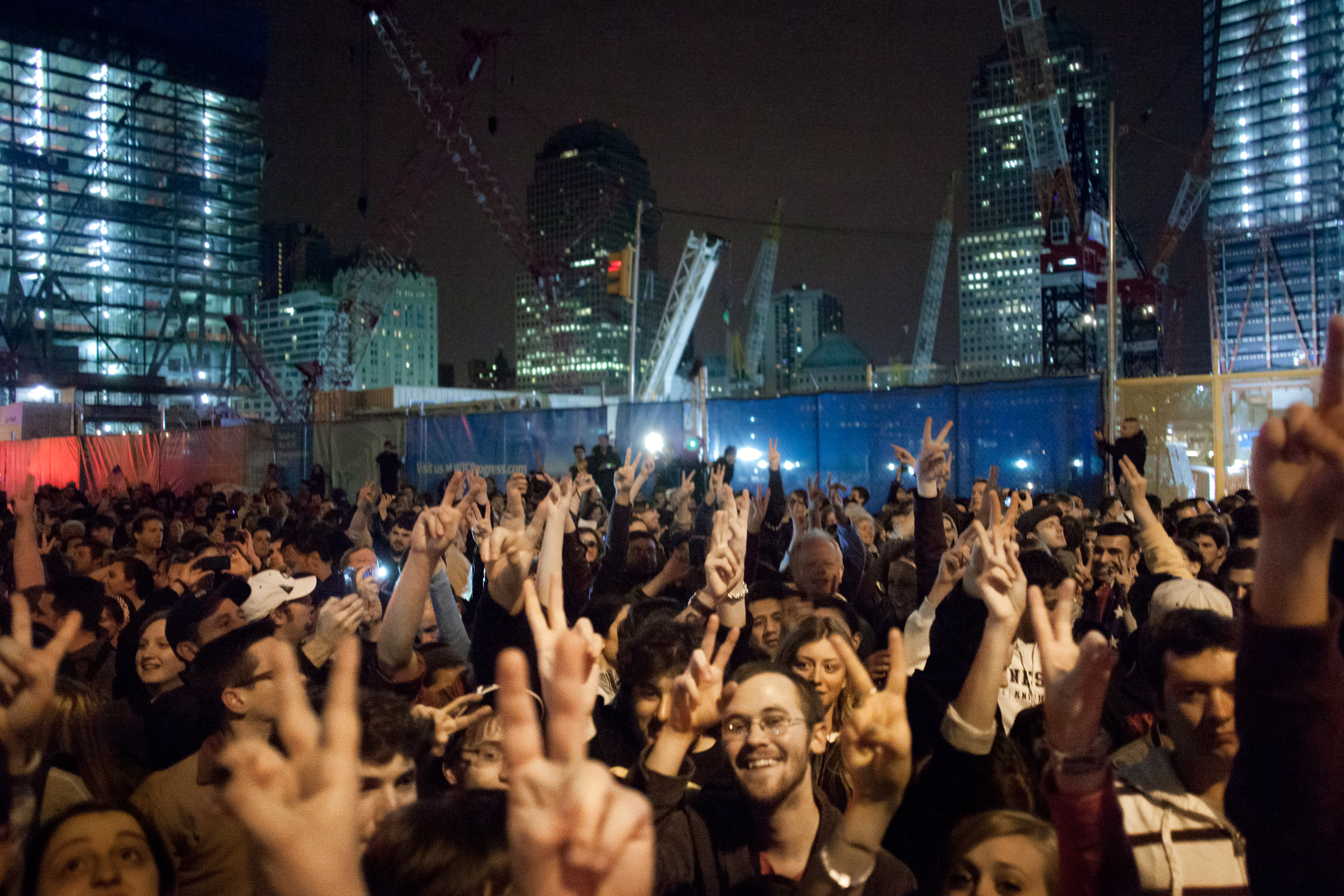
Celebratory crowd at Ground Zero following the announcement of the death of Osama bin Laden.

Crowds gathered outside of the White House on May 1, 2011, could be heard chanting "U-S-A!" after President Barack Obama announced that al-Qaeda co-founder Osama bin Laden had been killed by U.S. forces in Pakistan. Minutes before the announcement, crowds with plates and U.S flags in New York City had gathered at Times Square and Ground Zero (where the Twin Towers were located) for celebrating the successful operation, chanting "U-S-A!" repeatedly. The cheer was also chanted that Sunday evening at the only MLB baseball game being held while the news was breaking, between the Philadelphia Phillies and the New York Mets. At the 2011 WWE Extreme Rules event in Tampa, Florida on the same date, the arena erupted in "U-S-A" chants as the death of Osama bin Laden was announced by then WWE Champion, John Cena.

The chant is commonly used by Republican officials in Congress, particularly during the first and second presidency of Donald Trump. Republicans notably used it during Trump's first and second State of the Union address.

== Other ==
The "U-S-A" chant has been adopted by English soccer supporters during matches against Manchester United, who have U.S. owners unpopular with the club's supporters due to the club being saddled by massive debt. Opposing supporters remind the United supporters of this with the "U-S-A" chant; this was also true of Liverpool, until the Royal Bank of Scotland takeover. It is also chanted non-sarcastically by British supporters to celebrate achievements of American players such as Tim Howard at Everton and Christian Pulisic at Chelsea.

SpaceX employees were heard chanting "U-S-A" when their company's Falcon 9 first-stage booster succeeded in landing for the first time, in December 2015. The chant was heard again in April 2016, during the first successful attempt to recover the orbital-class booster on a barge at sea.

Chants of "U-S-A" and "White Sox" were heard in St. Peter's Square during the papal inauguration of Pope Leo XIV, the first American pontiff.

The chant frequently appears in American popular culture. One such chant was led by Woody Boyd in the Cheers episode "A Fine French Whine" to celebrate the deportation of a womanizing French citizen. It has also appeared in other comedy series such as The Jerry Springer Show, The Simpsons, and It's Always Sunny in Philadelphia, where it is humorously used as a generic celebratory cheer with no apparent national sentiment, or sardonically to lampoon jingoistic support for American flaws or wrongdoings.

== See also ==
- Aussie Aussie Aussie, Oi Oi Oi
