= Aussie Aussie Aussie, Oi Oi Oi =

Australian sports chant

"Aussie Aussie Aussie, Oi Oi Oi" is a cheer or chant often performed at Australian sport events. It is a variation of the "Oggy Oggy Oggy, oi oi oi" chant used by both football and rugby union fans in Great Britain from the 1960s onwards. It is usually performed by a crowd uniting to support a sports team or athlete. The alternate is for an individual to chant the line "Aussie, Aussie, Aussie!" and the crowd to respond with "Oi! Oi! Oi!". The first Australian chant was started in 1976 at the World Scout Jamboree by the contingent scout leader Wayne Abrahams.

== Definition ==
The full version of the chant, as heard prior to a free outdoor concert at the time of the Sydney 2000 Olympics and quoted by Luba Vangelova of CNNSI, is as follows:

Individual: "Aussie, Aussie, Aussie!"

Crowd: "Oi! Oi! Oi!"

Individual: "Aussie, Aussie, Aussie!"

Crowd: "Oi! Oi! Oi!"

Individual: "Aussie!"

Crowd: "Oi!"

Individual: "Aussie!"

Crowd: "Oi!"

Individual (faster): "Aussie, Aussie, Aussie!"

Crowd (equally fast): "Oi! Oi! Oi!"

The chant was widely used during the 2000 Sydney Olympic Games, being heard at many public entertainment venues and also on public transport. The chant came to be commonly heard at international sporting events where an Australian team was competing.

== Origins and explanation ==
A chant of near-identical form, "Oggy Oggy Oggy", has been used for decades by football and rugby crowds in Britain. "Oggy" is believed to be short for "hoggan", a Cornish word for a pasty, and the chant was used by Cornish miners to celebrate the Cornish pasty.

Members of the British Royal Navy claim to have used the Oggy Oggy Oggy chant, or a version of it, since the Second World War.

Englishman Ron Knox claims to have used the "Oggy" chant while playing for the Box Hill Rugby Club in Melbourne in the late 1960s. Various conflicting stories of how it was introduced from Britain to Australia can be found.

According to Stephen Alomes, a professor of Australian studies at Deakin University, the chant represents "enthusiasm for the tribe" and a "celebration of 'us'".

In 2012, after Foxtel offered a $10,000 prize in a competition for coming up with a new phrase to cheer on athletes, Germaine Greer argued:

The cry is catchy. Any crowd can pick it up and it cuts through the surrounding white noise like a military tattoo. It is as jingoistic to reject it because it was originally British as it would be to prize it for the same reason ... There will be no silencing Australian fans at the Olympics and they won't be bullied by Foxtel, either.

== Commercial and publicity uses ==
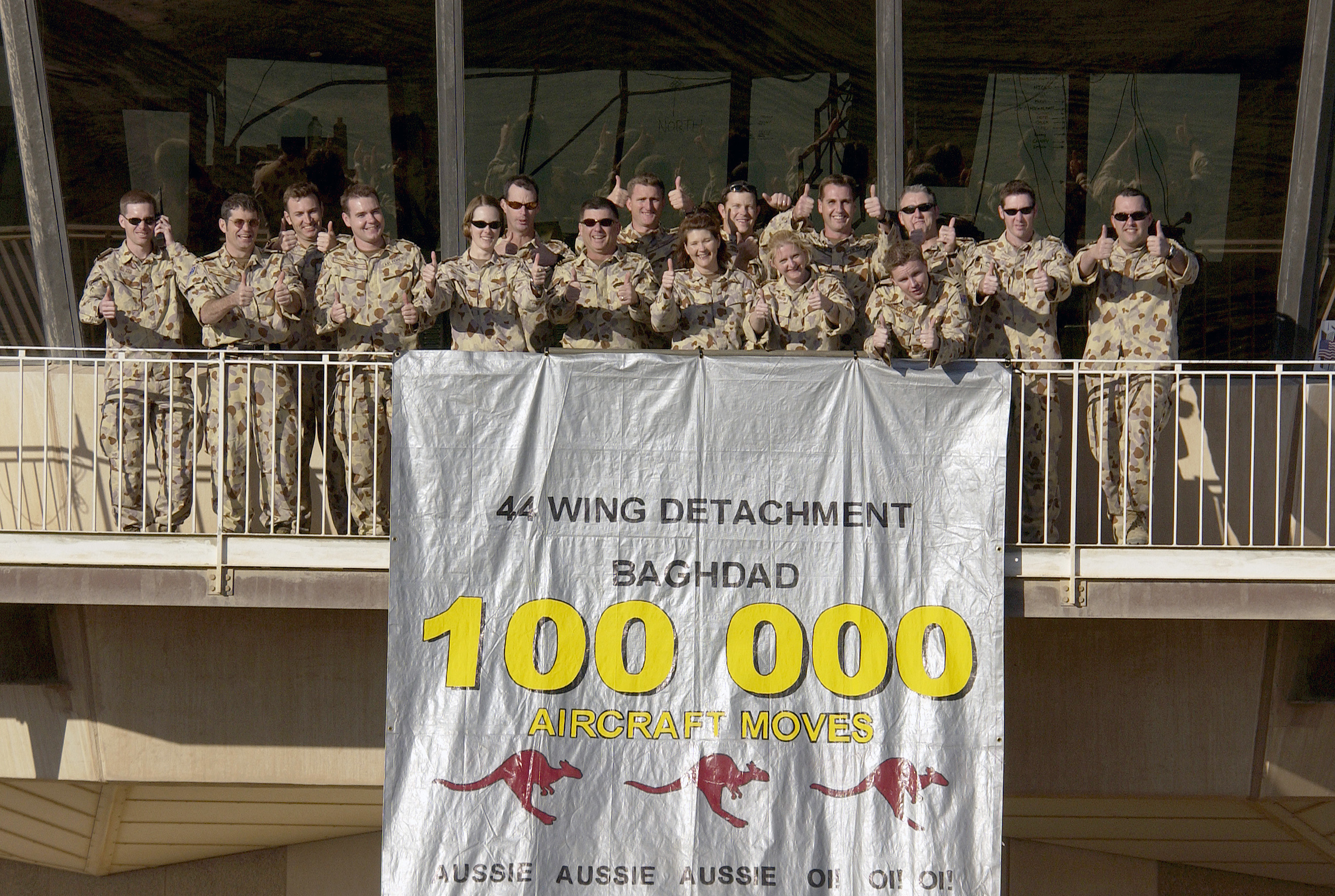
Members of a Royal Australian Air Force air traffic control detachment in Iraq with the slogan on a celebratory banner in 2004

At the closing ceremony of the Sydney 2000 Olympics, the IOC President, Juan Antonio Samaranch reflected the spirit of the whole affair when, during his formal speech, he said, "What can I say now? Maybe, with my Spanish accent, Aussie! Aussie! Aussie!". The response to these words came from all around the stadium, "Oi! Oi! Oi!".

In 2004, a Melbourne couple, inspired by a Dick Smith campaign supporting Australian-made products, and following publicity surrounding the ownership of the trademark for the Australian-developed Ugg boots being owned by a United States company, registered the phrase as an official trademark in an effort to protect it from overseas exploitation.

At the conclusion of winning the main event of the 2005 World Series of Poker, Australian supporters of winner Joe Hachem chanted this victoriously during the primetime viewing of the poker event on ESPN.

At the conclusion of the Prize giving ceremony for the 2008 Super 14 final at AMI Stadium in Christchurch, New Zealand, the winning team, the Crusaders, chanted "Robbie Robbie Robbie Oi Oi Oi" to farewell their Coach Robbie Deans, who was leaving to coach the Australian national team, the Wallabies.

Barack Obama used the cheer in November 2011 in a speech during a visit of the U.S and Australian Service Members on the Royal Army Air Force Base in Darwin, Australia.

In a promotional video for the American professional wrestling company WWE, Australian wrestler Emma chanted the song in support of the Australia national soccer team during the 2014 FIFA World Cup.

It is also a popular chant during Australian Cricket Team's matches.

The chant is also a fixture at men's basketball games at Saint Mary's College of California, a school that has regularly featured Australian players in the 21st century.

== See also ==
- Oggy Oggy Oggy
- Aussie
- 2000 Summer Olympics
- Oi!
