= Oggy Oggy Oggy =

Cornish and Devonian chant with call and response

The Oggy Oggy Oggy chant (alternatively spelt Oggie Oggie Oggie or Ogi Ogi Ogi), and its variations, are often heard at sporting events, political rallies and around numerous Scout and Guide campfires, primarily in Britain and some Commonwealth nations. One group will shout Oggy three times, while another will respond with Oi! three times.

The phrase may be of Cornish origin, possibly deriving from the Cornish language (a pasty is known in Devon and Cornwall as an Oggie, possibly deriving from "hoggan" - a Cornish word). The chant appeared in British sports grounds in the 1960s and 1970s, namely rugby union and football. Plymouth Argyle supporters have long used this as a chant. Welsh singer and comedian Max Boyce later popularised its use in Rugby Union, while in association football a popular variation was the "Ozzy Ozzy Ozzy" chant by Chelsea fans in homage to their star striker Peter Osgood. When Margaret Thatcher became British Prime Minister in 1979 a variation of the chant, "Maggie Maggie Maggie, Out Out Out!", was adopted by some of her opponents.

== Form ==
The usual form of the chant consists of two groups, one shouting the word "Oggy!" and the other group shouting the word "Oi!" Often a single individual will shout "Oggy" and everyone else will shout the reply, "Oi!". The words are shouted according to the following pattern.

Oggy Oggy Oggy!
Oi Oi Oi!

Oggy Oggy Oggy!
Oi Oi Oi!

Oggy!
Oi!

Oggy!
Oi!

Oggy Oggy Oggy!
Oi Oi Oi!

== Origins ==
"Oggy" is a slang term for a Cornish pasty derived from its Cornish language name, "hogen", and was used by local Cornish sailors throughout Cornwall as well as at the Devonport Dockyard in reference to pasty sellers who stand outside the gates. The chant formed the traditional end to the Tiddy Oggy Song, the unofficial anthem of the Devonshire and Dorset Regiment and The Devonport marines are still associated with the song Oggie Man by Cyril Tawney which they generally sing at public displays.

Tin-miners' wives or pasty sellers supposedly shouted "Oggy Oggy Oggy" – the response from any hungry miner or labourer would be Oi!, Oi!, Oi!. The chant is also the chorus of a folk song and has always been heard at Cornish rugby matches so this seem another possible origin.

The Oxford English Dictionary (2004) entry for "Oggy" states: "Oggy, noun. West Country regional (orig. Cornwall) and Navy slang. A Cornish pasty. Probably an alteration of Cornish hoggan pastry, pie (18th century), perhaps cognate with Welsh chwiogen muffin, simnel cake (1562), of unknown origin."

Members of the Royal Navy claim to have used the chant, or a version of it, since the Second World War. The 'Oggie, Oggie, Oggie' chant was used by supporters of the Royal Navy's Devonport Field Gun Team and by members of the Devonshire and Dorset Regiment. (The field gun competition was discontinued in 1999 after a hundred years of competition and the infantry regiment folded into The Rifles in 2007).

It was then adopted at a few British football grounds at some point during the postwar period, and was certainly in common use by the 1960s most notably at Home Park amongst the supporters of Plymouth Argyle.

In the 1970s the Welsh folk singer and comedian Max Boyce popularised the chant to excite the crowd at his concerts. Boyce is also a big rugby union fan, and through him it then began to be adopted by Welsh rugby union crowds at international matches. Soon it spread to rugby crowds at club and international level. In a patriotic outburst during her BAFTA Award acceptance speech in 2003 Welsh actress Catherine Zeta-Jones shouted the chant.

The chant was also used by Coventry City football fans during the 1980s and 1990s in appreciation to then goalkeeper Steve Ogrizovic who had been nicknamed "Oggy".

It is also often used at sideshows on rides such as the Heartbreaker and the Waltzers, where the rides controller says "oggie, oggie, oggie" and the people on the ride shout 'oi, oi, oi" to get the ride to speed up or get more spins etc.

== Use within scouting and guiding ==
Oggy Oggy Oggy has long been a major chant within Scouting and Guiding, especially within the UK. "An Oggy" as it is termed within Troops and Units is usually used at Scouting events and as a way of expressing thanks to those within and outside Scouting.

== Variations ==
Several variations of the "Oggy" chant have arisen as its cultural significance and recognition has grown. In the mid-1960s Hull City A.F.C. fans adapted it to "Waggy", to cheer for Ken Wagstaff and in the 1970s, Chelsea F.C. football fans changed it to "Ozzie", in honour of Peter Osgood, the footballer and speedway fans in the 70s and early 80s would chant "Ollie Ollie Ollie" to cheer on Danish rider Ole Olsen. When Margaret Thatcher came to power in Britain in 1979 a variation of the chant ("Maggie Maggie Maggie, Out Out Out!") was adopted by some of her opponents.

The "Oggy" chant was quite popular in Vancouver, British Columbia, Canada, in the late 1970s and early 1980s at the matches of North American Soccer League version of the Vancouver Whitecaps.

Another variation is the "Aussie Aussie Aussie, Oi Oi Oi" chant. It had been heard at Australian sporting events as early as 1987. The chant had found widespread popularity by the time of the 2000 Olympic Games in Sydney.

At Arizona Diamondbacks games during the 2008–09 seasons, fans would shout "Augie Augie Augie, Oi Oi Oi" in reference to utility infielder Augie Ojeda. (In many dialects of American English, "Augie" and "Oggy" are homophones).

At Seattle Storm WNBA basketball games, when Ezi Magbegor scores, the announcer chants, "Ezi, Ezi, Ezi," to which the fans repspond, "Oi, Oi, Oi!"

The chant has been adopted by the fans of English rugby union premiership side Wasps changing "Oggy" to "Allez" and "Oi" to "Wasps" and the Exeter Chiefs replacing the word Oi with the word Chiefs.

The chant was also popular in Calgary, Alberta, Canada, where a variation had fans of the Calgary Flames shout "Iggy, Iggy, Iggy, Oi Oi Oi" when Jarome Iginla fought or scored in a game. This was especially popular during his 50-goal season in the 2007–08 NHL season.

In Sweden, a popular version of the chant is "Bira Bira Bira, Bärs Bärs Bärs". Both words are slang for beer. It is used mostly among students and young people.

In France, there is another version: "Atchik Atchik Atchik, Aie Aie Aie". It's usually played in football match. This Tchik-atchik-atchik-aï-aï-aï is reminiscent of the song La Belle de Cadix by Francis Lopez.

The chant appeared with only the Oggies audible in the first episode of the second series of The Office, as a result of a conversation with the Oggmonster.
