= Il est interdit d'interdire! =

French aphorism

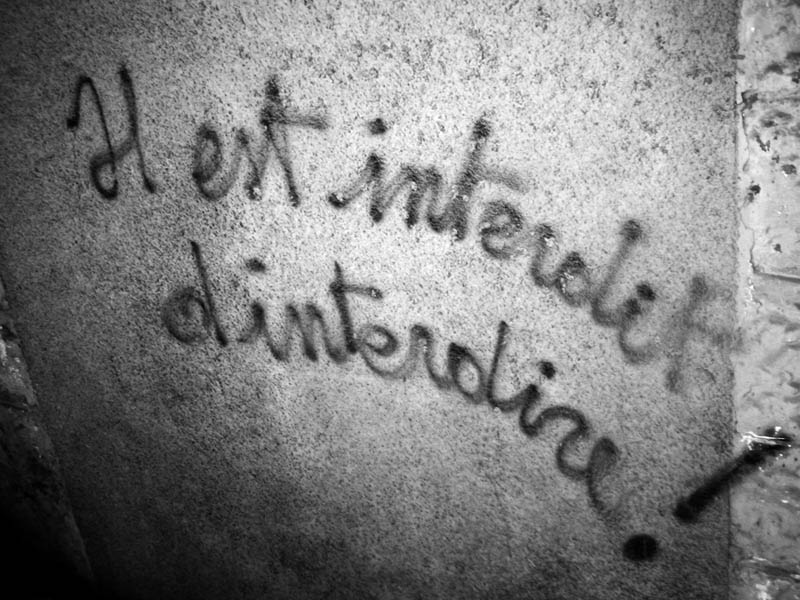
- Il est interdit d'interdire! graffiti on a wall in Menton, France
- Original form: Graffiti
- Context: May 1968
- Coined by: Jean Yanne
- Meaning: It is forbidden to forbid!

Il est interdit d'interdire! (pronounced [il ɛt‿ɛ̃tɛʁdi d ͜ ɛ̃tɛʁdiʁ], meaning "it is forbidden to forbid") is a French aphorism first used on an RTL broadcast by Jean Yanne in the form of a mocking joke - likely on a Sunday morning humorous talk show that he ran. This sentence later became one of the slogans of May 1968.

It was not used commonly in the publications or imagery of the 1968 protesters, but was well-known in spoken language, particularly with reference to sexual liberty.
