= Grade II* listed buildings in Cornwall (H–P) =

Cornwall shown in England

There are over 20,000 Grade II* listed buildings in England. This article comprises a list of these buildings in the county of Cornwall.

== List of buildings ==
Name	Location	Type	Completed (Note: The date given is the date used by Historic England as significant for the initial building or that of an important part in the structure's description.)	Date designated	Grid ref. (Note: The grid reference is based on the British national grid reference system, sometimes known as OSGB36, used by the Ordnance Survey.) Geo-coordinates	Entry number (Note: The "List Entry Number" is a unique number assigned to each listed building and scheduled monument by Historic England.)	Image
Halton Barton Farmhouse	St. Dominick	Farmhouse	Early 17th century	21 July 1951	SX4100665624; 50°28′08″N 4°14′30″W	1329382	Upload Photo
Harbour piers and quays	Mevagissey	Harbour	1770–73	11 March 1974	SX0165244796; 50°16′11″N 4°47′05″W	1210773	Harbour piers and quays More images
Harbour piers and quays including Inner Basin	Charlestown, St. Austell Bay	Harbour	1801?	11 March 1974	SX0387751631; 50°19′55″N 4°45′25″W	1327290	Harbour piers and quays including Inner Basin More images
Harbour piers and walls	Mousehole, Penzance	Harbour	17th century	29 July 1950	SW4700126266; 50°04′57″N 5°32′16″W	1219071	Harbour piers and walls More images
Harbour wharfs and piers including the two lighthouses (one disused)	St Ives	Harbour	1767–70	4 June 1952	SW5208840784; 50°12′54″N 5°28′35″W	1143383	Harbour wharfs and piers including the two lighthouses (one disused) More images
Harlyn House	St. Merryn	House	17th century	25 October 1951	SW8721175117; 50°32′13″N 5°00′15″W	1212748	Harlyn House
Hatt House	Botusfleming	House	Late 16th or early 17th century	23 January 1968	SX3974462344; 50°26′20″N 4°15′29″W	1140246	Upload Photo
Helland Bridge	St Mabyn	Road bridge	c.Early 15th century	4 November 1988	SX0652071498; 50°30′40″N 4°43′49″W	1327947	Helland Bridge More images
Hennett	Hennett, St. Juliot	Farmhouse	Probably late 16th century	17 December 1962	SX1307391350; 50°41′30″N 4°38′52″W	1143463	Upload Photo
Heskyn Mill and Chimney	St Germans	Corn mill	Early–mid-19th century	9 October 1987	SX3427159598; 50°24′46″N 4°20′02″W	1140571	Heskyn Mill and Chimney
Heyle (NAK Centre)	Helford Passage, Mawnan	House	1914	17 June 1988	SW7611226996; 50°06′03″N 5°07′55″W	1328411	Upload Photo
High Hall Farmhouse	Laneast	Farmhouse	Late 16th/early 17th century	1 December 1951	SX2366085751; 50°38′41″N 4°29′44″W	1142793	Upload Photo
Higher Lodge at Trematon Castle	Forder, Saltash	House	1807–08	22 November 1982	SX4102857960; 50°24′00″N 4°14′18″W	1140409	Upload Photo
Higher Penrose	North Petherwin	Farmhouse	Early 17th century	23 August 1957	SX2574989151; 50°40′33″N 4°28′03″W	1160373	Upload Photo
Higher Tresmorn	St Gennys	House	16th century	12 October 1984	SX1614197704; 50°44′59″N 4°36′28″W	1137246	Higher Tresmorn
Hogus House	Ludgvan Churchtown, Ludgvan	House	c.Late 18th century	16 January 1978	SW5051232987; 50°08′40″N 5°29′36″W	1143604	Hogus House More images
Holy Well about 7m south-east of Rialton Manor	Colan	Holy well	15th century	12 May 1988	SW8477362225; 50°25′13″N 5°01′52″W	1137202	Upload Photo
Holy Well of Saint Wendrona at SW676285	Wendron	Holy well	Probably 15th century	10 July 1957	SW6768528475; 50°06′39″N 5°15′02″W	1142042	Upload Photo
Holy Well of St Clether	St Clether	Holy well	15th century	19 January 1952	SX2023084591; 50°38′00″N 4°32′36″W	1159283	Holy Well of St Clether More images
House adjoining Church Cottage to the west	Stratton, Bude–Stratton	House	Late 15th/early 16th century	5 March 1952	SS2309206468; 50°49′50″N 4°30′48″W	1141878	Upload Photo
Huer's House	Newquay	House	Probably late 18th/early 19th century	24 October 1951	SW8067262386; 50°25′13″N 5°05′20″W	1144136	Huer's House More images
Inscribed stone (Castle Dor Stone, aka the Tristan Stone)	Fowey	Inscribed stone	c.550 AD	13 March 1951	SX1123152120; 50°20′19″N 4°39′15″W	1219027	Inscribed stone (Castle Dor Stone, aka the Tristan Stone) More images
Keigwin and Little Keigwin	Mousehole, Penzance	Manor house	16th century	29 July 1950	SW4689026266; 50°04′57″N 5°32′22″W	1143207	Keigwin and Little Keigwin More images
Kennal Vale House, including adjoining garden walls, gate piers and gates	Kennal Vale, Stithians	Country house	c.1830	17 June 1988	SW7463037099; 50°11′27″N 5°09′31″W	1162099	Upload Photo
Kerris Manor Farmhouse including front garden walls and rear courtyard walls	Kerris, Paul	Gate pier	17th century	15 December 1988	SW4430727155; 50°05′22″N 5°34′34″W	1327506	Kerris Manor Farmhouse including front garden walls and rear courtyard walls More images
Kestle	Egloshayle	House	c.Late 15th/early 16th century	4 November 1988	SX0163371770; 50°30′43″N 4°47′57″W	1143047	Upload Photo
Kestle Barton Farmhouse and Kestle Cottage, including adjoining garden walls	Manaccan	Farmhouse	17th century	10 July 1957	SW7534725469; 50°05′12″N 5°08′31″W	1141732	Upload Photo
Keveral Barton	St Martin-by-Looe	House	c.16th century	21 August 1964	SX2975355168; 50°22′18″N 4°23′44″W	1329284	Upload Photo
Killiow House	Kea	Country house	18th century	30 May 1967	SW8046242138; 50°14′18″N 5°04′48″W	1329022	Upload Photo
King Charles's Castle	Tresco, Isles of Scilly	Castle	1550–54	14 December 1992	SV8825316115; 49°57′49″N 6°20′55″W	1328850	King Charles's Castle More images
Kitchen garden walls with gate piers about 30m south-west of Lanherne Carmelite Convent	St Mawgan, Mawgan-in-Pydar	Gate pier	Early 18th century	12 May 1988	SW8708365837; 50°27′13″N 5°00′03″W	1327382	Upload Photo
Knill's Monument, Worvas	St. Ives	Commemorative monument	1782	4 June 1952	SW5163038668; 50°11′45″N 5°28′53″W	1143386	Knill's Monument, Worvas More images
Lamellen	St Tudy	House	1849	4 November 1988	SX0555477329; 50°33′48″N 4°44′49″W	1309875	Upload Photo
Lancarffe	Lancarffe, Helland	House	Probably 17th century	6 June 1969	SX0825268948; 50°29′20″N 4°42′16″W	1146396	Upload Photo
Lander's Monument	Truro	Statue	1852	29 December 1950	SW8235844400; 50°15′34″N 5°03′17″W	1282638	Lander's Monument More images
Langford Hill	Marhamchurch	House	Early 18th century	28 September 1961	SS2367401334; 50°47′05″N 4°30′10″W	1328535	Upload Photo
Lantau	East Looe, Looe	Jettied house	Late 16th/early 17th century	19 March 1951	SX2557853189; 50°21′10″N 4°27′11″W	1282823	Upload Photo
Lantern cross about 7m north-west of Church of St Mawgan	St Mawgan, Mawgan-in-Pydar	Cross	15th century	12 December 1991	SW8720865949; 50°27′17″N 4°59′57″W	1115117	Upload Photo
Lanyon farmhouse, including front garden area wall	Gwinear–Gwithian	Farmhouse	1668	14 January 1988	SW6034237794; 50°11′30″N 5°21′32″W	1327594	Upload Photo
Launcells Barton	Launcells	Farmhouse	c.1600	29 September 1961	SS2448505749; 50°49′29″N 4°29′36″W	1328573	Upload Photo
Launceston town walls	Launceston	Town wall	Probably 12th century	13 September 1972	SX3329584623; 50°38′15″N 4°21′32″W	1195978	Upload Photo
Lavethan	Blisland	House	c.Early to mid-16th century	6 June 1969	SX0954473015; 50°31′33″N 4°41′18″W	1142391	Upload Photo
Lawn House	Mevagissey	House	18th century	28 November 1950	SX0131045101; 50°16′21″N 4°47′23″W	1210790	Lawn House
Lawrence House and Museum and forecourt wall	Launceston	Town house	1753	27 February 1950	SX3306084753; 50°38′19″N 4°21′44″W	1206174	Upload Photo
Lead bust to south-east of Prideaux Place	Prideaux Place, Padstow	Bust	18th century	20 May 1988	SW9139775538; 50°32′32″N 4°56′44″W	1212013	Lead bust to south-east of Prideaux Place
Leaze	St Breward	House	c.mid-17th century	20 March 1985	SX1332176858; 50°33′42″N 4°38′14″W	1327915	Upload Photo
Leek Seed Chapel	St Blazey Gate, St. Blaise	Wesleyan Methodist chapel	1824	14 April 1999	SX0602153698; 50°21′04″N 4°43′41″W	1386524	Leek Seed Chapel More images
Leigh Farmhouse	Week St Mary	Farmhouse	Late 16th/early 17th century	17 June 1982	SX2420098912; 50°45′47″N 4°29′39″W	1328250	Upload Photo
Lerryn Bridge	Lerryn, St Veep	Bridge	Repaired 1573	21 August 1964	SX1408757153; 50°23′05″N 4°36′59″W	1329264	Lerryn Bridge More images
Levalsa Farmhouse	St Ewe	Farmhouse	c.Early 17th century	15 November 1988	SW9996948580; 50°18′11″N 4°48′37″W	1136796	Levalsa Farmhouse
Little Tregrill and outbuildings adjoining to south-west	Menheniot	House	Late 16th century	26 November 1985	SX2821663100; 50°26′33″N 4°25′14″W	1312676	Upload Photo
Little Trethewey Wesleyan Chapel	Little Trethewey, St Levan	Wesleyan Methodist chapel	1868	15 December 1988	SW3797523807; 50°03′24″N 5°39′44″W	1311918	Upload Photo
Long Stone	St Austell	Standing stone	Bronze Age	11 March 1974	SX0295952119; 50°20′09″N 4°46′13″W	1212080	Upload Photo
Lower Hampt including attached wall and archway	Stokeclimsland	Farmhouse	Late 16th century	22 November 1960	SX3960174203; 50°32′44″N 4°15′55″W	1220204	Upload Photo
Lower Trekenner Farmhouse and Cottage	Trekenner, Lezant	House	Early 17th century	11 May 1989	SX3423578294; 50°34′51″N 4°20′34″W	1291321	Upload Photo
Lower Truscott	St Stephens by Launceston Rural	House	Early 17th century	11 January 1989	SX3019485969; 50°38′55″N 4°24′12″W	1327997	Lower Truscott
Lowerton House	Landrake, Landrake with St. Erney	Farmhouse	Probably late 16th/early 17th century	23 January 1968	SX3760360632; 50°25′23″N 4°17′15″W	1140565	Upload Photo
Lychgate and adjoining churchyard walls south of Church of St Gwendron	Wendron	Lych gate	Probably late 18th century	10 July 1957	SW6787731029; 50°08′02″N 5°14′58″W	1162651	Lychgate and adjoining churchyard walls south of Church of St Gwendron More images
No. 26 Church Street	Launceston	Apartment	17th century	27 February 1950	SX3319684600; 50°38′14″N 4°21′37″W	1206285	No. 26 Church Street
No. 11, 13 and 13A High Street and 12 Broad Street	Launceston	House	18th century	27 February 1950	SX3317084586; 50°38′13″N 4°21′38″W	1206510	Upload Photo
No. 5 Castle Street	Launceston	House	Early 18th century	13 September 1972	SX3305184722; 50°38′18″N 4°21′44″W	1280379	Upload Photo
No. 5 and 7 Southgate Street	Launceston	House	18th century	27 February 1950	SX3323684570; 50°38′13″N 4°21′35″W	1196027	No. 5 and 7 Southgate Street
No. 8 and 9 Quay Street	Lostwithiel	House	Early–mid-18th century	21 April 1976	SX1047159707; 50°24′24″N 4°40′07″W	1146531	Upload Photo
No. 27 Polkirt Hill	Mevagissey	House	Early 18th century	28 November 1950	SX0151044679; 50°16′07″N 4°47′12″W	1289977	No. 27 Polkirt Hill More images
No. 3 Chapel Street	Penzance	House	18th century	29 July 1950	SW4737830152; 50°07′03″N 5°32′07″W	1220707	Upload Photo
No. 51 High Street	Falmouth	Merchants house	Late 17th century	23 January 1973	SW8063133138; 50°09′27″N 5°04′21″W	1270039	Upload Photo
No. 27 and 29 Fore Street	Fowey	House	Early 17th century	13 March 1951	SX1261951777; 50°20′10″N 4°38′04″W	1144272	No. 27 and 29 Fore Street
No. 54 and 55 Church Street	Falmouth	Shop	Early 19th century	22 July 1949	SW8091532793; 50°09′17″N 5°04′06″W	1270078	Upload Photo
No. 1–3 Bank Place	Falmouth	Terrace	c.1770s	22 July 1949	SW8112232455; 50°09′06″N 5°03′55″W	1270126	No. 1–3 Bank Place More images
No. 48 Arwenack Street	Falmouth	Town house	c.1770s	22 July 1949	SW8109232491; 50°09′07″N 5°03′57″W	1270121	No. 48 Arwenack Street
Manning chest tomb about 17m south of the chancel of the Church of St Morwenna	Morwenstow	Chest tomb	Early 17th century	9 September 1985	SS2051415288; 50°54′33″N 4°33′16″W	1328565	Upload Photo
Manor Farm	Camelford	House	Possibly late 16th century	17 December 1962	SX1069083848; 50°37′25″N 4°40′40″W	1143562	Manor Farm More images
Manor Houses	Grampound, Grampound with Creed	House	Probably 16th/early 17th century	10 February 1967	SW9361548268; 50°17′53″N 4°53′57″W	1327435	Manor Houses
Mansion House	Blisland	House	c.Late 16th century or earlier	6 June 1969	SX1007573220; 50°31′40″N 4°40′52″W	1311659	Mansion House
Marhayes Manor, including garden area wall adjoining at north-east and running parallel to north front	Week St Mary	Farmhouse	c.Early 17th century	29 September 1961	SS2419000818; 50°46′49″N 4°29′43″W	1137624	Upload Photo
Market House	St Austell	Market house	1844	11 March 1974	SX0139252504; 50°20′20″N 4°47′33″W	1289697	Market House More images
Marlborough House	Falmouth	Country house	c.1810	23 January 1973	SW7994531956; 50°08′48″N 5°04′53″W	1270002	Upload Photo
Marsland Manor	Marsland Manor, Morwenstow	Farmhouse	16th century origins	26 September 1951	SS2168716760; 50°55′22″N 4°32′18″W	1328542	Marsland Manor
Maryfield House	Maryfield, Antony	House	c.1849	26 January 1987	SX4235656196; 50°23′04″N 4°13′08″W	1159513	Maryfield House More images
Mausoleum of Sir James Tillie, Mount Ararat	Mount Ararat, Pillaton	Mausoleum	Early 18th century	23 January 1968	SX4067865121; 50°27′51″N 4°14′46″W	1329359	Mausoleum of Sir James Tillie, Mount Ararat
Medros Farmhouse and Methrose Farmhouse	Luxulyan	Farmhouse	c.1400	7 January 1952	SX0506556312; 50°22′28″N 4°44′34″W	1144215	Upload Photo
Meledor Farmhouse	St Stephen-in-Brannel	Farmhouse	Late 16th/early 17th century	7 January 1952	SW9273454833; 50°21′25″N 4°54′55″W	1327463	Upload Photo
Menabilly House	Menabilly, Fowey	House	c.1710–15	13 March 1951	SX1002751171; 50°19′47″N 4°40′14″W	1210574	Menabilly House More images
Menacuddle Baptistery Church	St Austell, Treverbyn	Baptistery	15th century	28 November 1950	SX0118953255; 50°20′44″N 4°47′44″W	1289730	Upload Photo
Merthen Manor	Merthen, Constantine	Cross-passage house	1575	10 July 1957	SW7271326411; 50°05′39″N 5°10′45″W	1142128	Upload Photo
Methodist Chapel	Gwithian Churchtown, Gwinear–Gwithian	Methodist chapel	c.1810	14 January 1988	SW5863141166; 50°13′16″N 5°23′06″W	1159592	Upload Photo
Methodist Chapel	Penrose, St Ervan	Methodist chapel	1861	20 May 1988	SW8753970763; 50°29′53″N 4°59′50″W	1212478	Methodist Chapel More images
Methodist Church (former Wesleyan Chapel) and attached vestry	St. Just	Wesleyan Methodist chapel	1833	21 September 1973	SW3690731570; 50°07′33″N 5°40′56″W	1143291	Methodist Church (former Wesleyan Chapel) and attached vestry More images
Methodist Church and forecourt wall, railings and gateway	Porthleven	Chapel	1883	22 May 1990	SW6296425923; 50°05′10″N 5°18′54″W	1208344	Methodist Church and forecourt wall, railings and gateway More images
Methodist Church including railings	Chapel St, Penzance	Methodist chapel	Mid-19th century	7 February 1974	SW4738330092; 50°07′01″N 5°32′06″W	1143151	Methodist Church including railings More images
Milltown House and garden walls to front	Yeolmbridge, Werrington	House	Early 18th century	11 January 1989	SX3161687431; 50°39′44″N 4°23′02″W	1142820	Upload Photo
Moditonham House	Botusfleming	House	Early 18th century	23 January 1968	SX4134461283; 50°25′48″N 4°14′07″W	1140248	Moditonham House
Monument to H M Grylls	Helston	Gate	1834	22 May 1972	SW6569927410; 50°06′02″N 5°16′40″W	1196470	Monument to H M Grylls More images
Mr Lanyon's Almhouses and walls Surrounding Garden to East	Playing Place, Kea	Almshouses	1726	30 May 1967	SW8133741330; 50°13′53″N 5°04′02″W	1141647	Mr Lanyon's Almhouses and walls Surrounding Garden to East More images
Murdoch House	Redruth	House	Late 18th century	1 December 1951	SW6981241961; 50°13′58″N 5°13′45″W	1161666	Murdoch House More images
Nance Farmhouse	Churchtown, Illogan	Dower house	Earlier 18th century and earlier	1 December 1951	SW6693644321; 50°15′10″N 5°16′15″W	1328148	Upload Photo
Nancealverne House	Penzance	House	18th century	29 July 1950	SW4612630776; 50°07′21″N 5°33′11″W	1291315	Upload Photo
Napheane Farmhouse	Constantine	Farmhouse	Mid-17th century	17 June 1988	SW7147328428; 50°06′43″N 5°11′52″W	1328396	Napheane Farmhouse
New Hall Farmhouse	Advent	Farmhouse	c.Late 16th century or earlier	13 January 1988	SX1094980428; 50°35′34″N 4°40′21″W	1137654	Upload Photo
New Pattern Shop	Perran Wharf, Mylor	Pattern shop	c.Early 19th century	30 May 1967	SW7768138490; 50°12′16″N 5°07′01″W	1328668	Upload Photo
Newbridge	Newbridge, Callington	Bridge	Mentioned 1478	23 January 1968	SX3473767991; 50°29′18″N 4°19′52″W	1140043	Newbridge More images
Newman House	Hugh Town, St. Mary's, Isles of Scilly	House	1716–18	12 February 1975	SV8990410788; 49°55′00″N 6°19′17″W	1328846	Newman House More images
No 1, Cross St, with attached forecourt and garden walls	Helston	Town house	Early 18th century	24 March 1950	SW6583527674; 50°06′10″N 5°16′33″W	1196306	No 1, Cross St, with attached forecourt and garden walls
No 4, Cross St and attached forecourt walls, steps and railings	Helston	House	1790s	24 March 1950	SW6574127576; 50°06′07″N 5°16′38″W	1297696	Upload Photo
No 4, High St incorporating the Judge's Kitchen	Launceston	Jettied house	16th/early 17th century	27 February 1950	SX3317684628; 50°38′15″N 4°21′38″W	1195985	Upload Photo
No 58, Coinagehall St and attached walls	Helston	Town house	Early/mid-18th century	22 May 1972	SW6572227394; 50°06′01″N 5°16′39″W	1196302	Upload Photo
Offices	Perran Wharf, Mylor	Iron foundry	c.Early/mid-19th century	30 May 1967	SW7759438449; 50°12′15″N 5°07′05″W	1141602	Upload Photo
Ogbeare Hall	North Tamerton	House	15th century	29 September 1961	SX3017295936; 50°44′17″N 4°24′29″W	1137225	Upload Photo
Old Mansion House	Truro	Town house	c.1706–08	29 December 1950	SW8282944775; 50°15′47″N 5°02′54″W	1206030	Old Mansion House More images
Open fronted outbuilding about 2m south-east of Radford Farmhouse	Werrington	Pump	19th century	11 February 1988	SX3182188995; 50°40′35″N 4°22′54″W	1309930	Upload Photo
Orangery in the Italian Garden	Mount Edgcumbe Country Park, Maker-with-Rame	Orangery	Late 18th century	21 July 1951	SX4547153274; 50°21′33″N 4°10′26″W	1329142	Orangery in the Italian Garden More images
Orangery with urn about 12m north and busts arranged to south, Port Eliot	St Germans	Orangery	c.1790	23 January 1968	SX3604357690; 50°23′46″N 4°18′29″W	1140517	Orangery with urn about 12m north and busts arranged to south, Port Eliot
Outbuildings and adjoining walls about 30m north-west of Pengersick Castle	Breage	Gate lodge	Early 16th century	26 August 1987	SW5815328441; 50°06′24″N 5°23′01″W	1142231	Upload Photo
Pair of gate piers and gate about 125m south-east of Trewardreva House	Trewardreva, Constantine	Gate	Late 19th century	10 July 1957	SW7270930070; 50°07′37″N 5°10′53″W	1142139	Upload Photo
Pair of lodges with attached walls at the north entrance to Lanhydrock Park	Lanhydrock Park, Lanhydrock	Gate	Probably late 18th century	15 April 1988	SX0883964621; 50°27′01″N 4°41′39″W	1143096	Upload Photo
Palace Printers and the Old Palace	Lostwithiel	Shop	Late 13th century	21 April 1976	SX1046759688; 50°24′23″N 4°40′07″W	1146471	Palace Printers and the Old Palace More images
Panter's Bridge	Warleggan	Bridge	15th century	21 August 1964	SX1589868026; 50°28′59″N 4°35′47″W	1329216	Panter's Bridge More images
Parc Venton	Mullion	House	c.1820s	9 October 1984	SW6759518568; 50°01′19″N 5°14′45″W	1158165	Upload Photo
Parish Church of St Martin	Liskeard	Church	Mostly 15th century	23 September 1950	SX2540564405; 50°27′12″N 4°27′39″W	1206300	Parish Church of St Martin More images
Parish Church of St Mary	Penzance	Parish church	1832–35	29 July 1950	SW4752830027; 50°06′59″N 5°31′59″W	1220507	Parish Church of St Mary More images
Parkandillick Engine House	Parkandillick China Clay Works, St Dennis	Boiler house	19th century	12 May 1988	SW9480256827; 50°22′32″N 4°53′14″W	1138336	Parkandillick Engine House
Pavilion to Wearde Farmhouse	Saltash	Country house	Mid-18th century	22 November 1982	SX4214058145; 50°24′07″N 4°13′22″W	1140349	Pavilion to Wearde Farmhouse
Pelyn	Lostwithiel	House	c.1600	28 August 1987	SX0912358804; 50°23′53″N 4°41′13″W	1137864	Upload Photo
Pencarrow House	Egloshayle	Country house	Late 17th or early 18th century	4 November 1988	SX0397371056; 50°30′23″N 4°45′57″W	1311084	Pencarrow House More images
Penelewey Barton Farmhouse and garden walls to South	Kea	Farmhouse	1710	12 March 1986	SW8184540867; 50°13′39″N 5°03′36″W	1159515	Upload Photo
Penfound Manor	Poundstock	Cross-passage house	15th century or earlier	26 September 1951	SX2209899731; 50°46′11″N 4°31′28″W	1328570	Upload Photo
Pengenna	St Kew	House	16th or earlier 17th century	6 June 1969	SX0503478652; 50°34′30″N 4°45′18″W	1320619	Upload Photo
Pengover Manor Farmhouse	Menheniot	Farmhouse	Late 16th or early 17th century	23 January 1985	SX2810465272; 50°27′43″N 4°25′24″W	1329410	Upload Photo
Penhaligon House, Prince's Street front	Truro	Town house	Early 18th century	29 December 1950	SW8279144775; 50°15′46″N 5°02′56″W	1205930	Upload Photo
Penkivel Farmhouse at OS ref SK867410	Tregothnan Park, St. Michael Penkevil	Manor house	16th/17th century	28 February 1982	SW8672141024; 50°13′50″N 4°59′31″W	1218978	Upload Photo
Penmellyn	St Columb Major	House	c.1855	3 March 1987	SW9141763785; 50°26′12″N 4°56′19″W	1327399	Upload Photo
Pennans Farmhouse	Grampound with Creed	Farmhouse	c.1680	7 January 1952	SW9546048967; 50°18′18″N 4°52′25″W	1144033	Upload Photo
Pennellick Farmhouse	Pelynt	Farmhouse	Late 14th century	26 March 1986	SX2041553409; 50°21′11″N 4°31′33″W	1140728	Upload Photo
Penrice	High Porthpean, Pentewan Valley	Country house	Mid-18th century	11 March 1974	SX0219649884; 50°18′56″N 4°46′47″W	1211821	Upload Photo
Penrose Manor House	Porthleven	Country house	17th century	24 March 1950	SW6412525775; 50°05′07″N 5°17′55″W	1196347	Penrose Manor House More images
Pentillie Castle	Pillaton	Country house	Late 17th century	21 July 1951	SX4099864557; 50°27′33″N 4°14′29″W	1140189	Pentillie Castle More images
Penwarne House	Penwarne, Mawnan	Country house	Late 18th century	10 July 1957	SW7736430270; 50°07′50″N 5°06′59″W	1142101	Upload Photo
Pillwood House	Feock, Truro	Holiday house	1974	2 August 2017	SW8259338639; 50°12′28″N 5°02′54″W	1449048	Upload Photo
Polgover	Morval	House	c.17th century	21 August 1964	SX2763158908; 50°24′17″N 4°25′37″W	1137947	Upload Photo
Polhawn Fort	Maker-with-Rame	House	1865	19 November 1986	SX4205449224; 50°19′18″N 4°13′12″W	1310634	Polhawn Fort More images
Polruan Castle	Polruan, Lanteglos	Blockhouse	c.1540	21 August 1964	SX1233651085; 50°19′47″N 4°38′17″W	1329297	Polruan Castle More images
Polwheveral Bridge	Polwheveral, Constantine	Road bridge	1572	17 June 1988	SW7371028449; 50°06′46″N 5°09′59″W	1142132	Upload Photo
Polytechnic Hall	Falmouth	Lending library	1834–35	22 July 1949	SW8091232686; 50°09′13″N 5°04′06″W	1270107	Polytechnic Hall More images
Ponsanooth Methodist Church, including forecourt walls, steps and gate piers	Ponsanooth, St. Gluvias	Chapel	1843	28 June 1963	SW7576837635; 50°11′46″N 5°08′35″W	1159101	Ponsanooth Methodist Church, including forecourt walls, steps and gate piers More images
Porloe Farmhouse	Mylor	Farmhouse	c.mid-18th century	12 March 1986	SW8158335048; 50°10′30″N 5°03′37″W	1310625	Upload Photo
Porth-en-alls	Prussia Cove, St. Hilary	House	1906	9 October 1987	SW5583727953; 50°06′05″N 5°24′56″W	1161301	Porth-en-alls More images
Porth-en-alls Lodge	Prussia Cove, St. Hilary	Lodge	c.1910–14	9 October 1987	SW5582127942; 50°06′05″N 5°24′57″W	1143755	Upload Photo
Porthmeor Pilchard Cellars and Studios	St Ives	Fish cellar	Mid-19th century	2 June 2004	SW5178940868; 50°12′56″N 5°28′50″W	1390857	Upload Photo
Princes House	Truro	Town house	c.1740	29 December 1950	SW8277244778; 50°15′47″N 5°02′57″W	1282621	Princes House More images
Pump Engine House at Taylor's Shaft of New East Pool Mine	Pool, Carn Brea	Engine house	1924	9 April 1975	SW6741641881; 50°13′52″N 5°15′45″W	1142600	Pump Engine House at Taylor's Shaft of New East Pool Mine
Pump Engine House to Robinson's Shaft at South Crofty Mine	Carn Brea	Tin mine	1903	12 September 1989	SW6679641244; 50°13′30″N 5°16′15″W	1142628	Pump Engine House to Robinson's Shaft at South Crofty Mine

== See also ==
- Grade I listed buildings in Cornwall
- Grade II* listed buildings in Cornwall
  - Grade II* listed buildings in Cornwall (A–G)
  - Grade II* listed buildings in Cornwall (Q–Z)
