= High-intensity magnetic separator =

In the recent past the problem of removing the deleterious iron particles from a process stream had a few alternatives. Magnetic separation was typically limited and moderately effective. Magnetic separators that used permanent magnets could generate fields of low intensity only. These worked well in removing ferrous tramp but not fine paramagnetic particles. Thus high-intensity magnetic separators that were effective in collecting paramagnetic particles came into existence. These focus on the separation of very fine particles that are paramagnetic.

The current is passed through the coil, which creates a magnetic field, which magnetizes the expanded steel matrix ring. The paramagnetic matrix material behaves like a magnet in the magnetic field and thereby attracts the fines. The ring is rinsed when it is in the magnetic field and all the non-magnetic particles are carried with the rinse water. Next as the ring leaves the magnetic zone the ring is flushed and a vacuum of about – 0.3 bars is applied to remove the magnetic particles attached to the matrix ring.

== Standard operating procedure ==
High-gradient magnetic separator is to separate magnetic and non-magnetic particles (concentrate and tails) from the feed slurry. This feed comes from intermediate thickener underflow pump through Linear Screen & Passive Matrix. Tailings go to tailing thickener & product goes to throw launder through vacuum tanks.

== Ion separation ==
Ion separation is another application of magnetic separation. The separation is driven by the magnetic field that induces a separating force. The force differentiate then between heavy and lighter ions causing the separation. This phenomenon has been demonstrated on test bench and pilot scale.
