= Nicholas Trestrail =

British engineer (b. 1858, d. 1922)

Nicholas Trestrail (December 1858 – 1922) was a British mining engineer in Redruth, Cornwall, England. He was the designer of the Harvey's Engine, a Cornish beam engine initially used as a pumping engine as of 1892 in the Carn Brea mine and from 1924 until 28 September 1954 in the East Pool mine.

He was born, worked, lived, and died in Redruth. He married Grace Wilkins Michell, had 6 children, and 1 servant.

== The Cornish beam engine ==
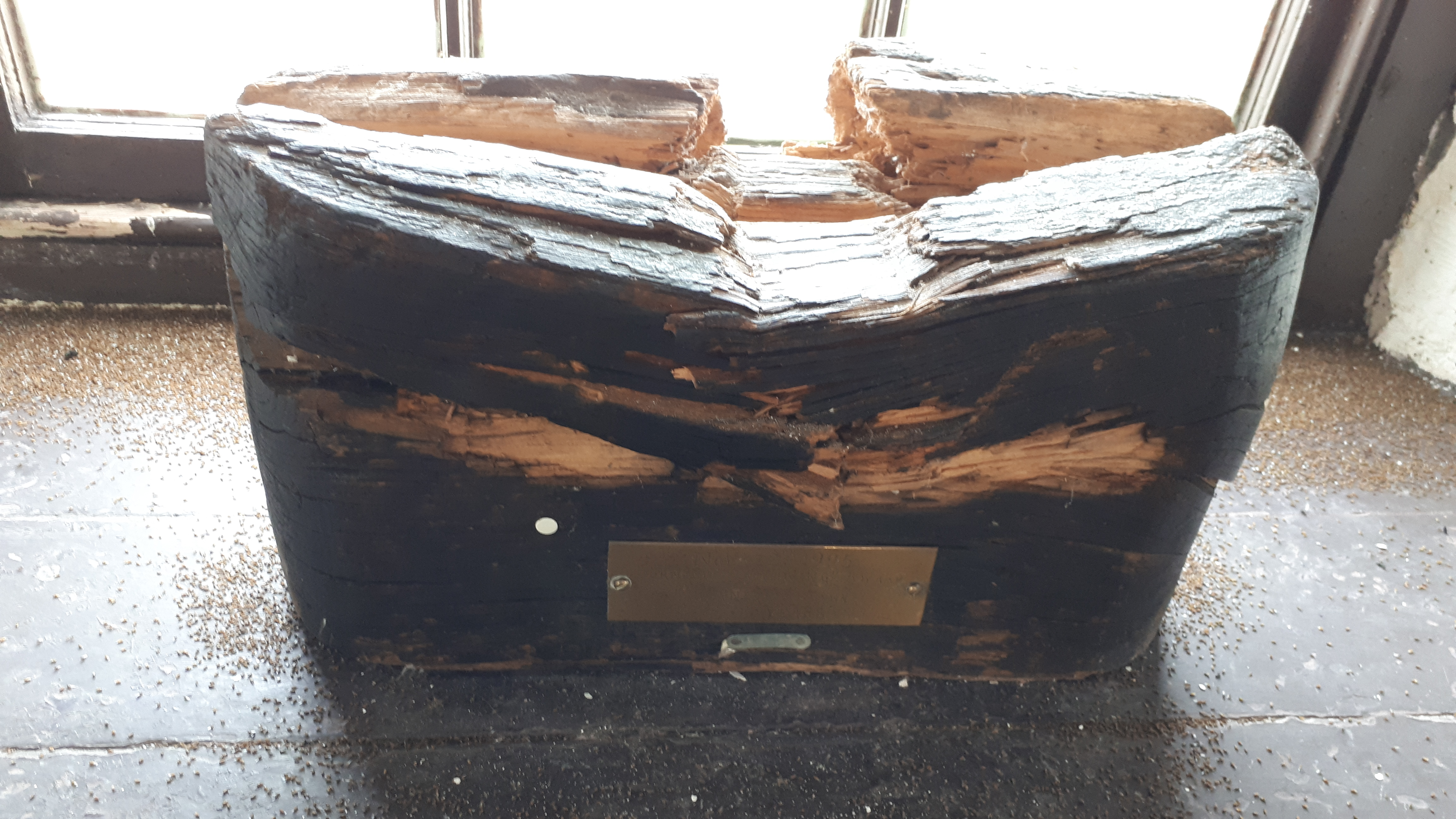
Sacrifice block in the engine house of Taylor's Shaft East Pool mine

Trestrail built upon the high pressure steam engine technology of Richard Trevithick to design his large coal boiler driven single-acting high-pressure engine, implementing an equilibrium valve between the chambers above and below of the piston. Because of the dual-phase process the maximum of energy could be extracted from the steam. Efficiency was also increased by insulating the pipes, cylinders, and boilers. Also when the machine was not required to work at full capacity, cycles could be skipped, saving even more energy. Due to its irregular mechanical movements caused by its design the Cornish engine was not useful for rotational duties like winching, but it was well adapted for water pumping using a linear moving lever. A sacrifice wooden block was used as an audible protective and alarm mechanism to notify the operator when too much steam would be applied at low power pumping conditions. In order to prevent machine breakdown, the operator would then immediately shut down or reduce the steam inflow.

Coal was not local to Cornwall; it was to be transported from South Wales by ship and train which required a lot of labor, so it was very expensive, and constituted a major part of the mining costs. Steam engine performance was expressed as duty, defined by Smeaton to be number of pounds of water raised one foot by one bushel of coal. Due to its design and functioning the engine was more fuel efficient than previous Watt engines in such a way that mine owners where required to pay a royalty based on the amount of fuel saving. The Harvey's Engine consumed typically 500 kg of coal per hour.

== See also ==
- East Pool mine
- Cornish engine
