= Conder (fishing) =

Fishing assistant

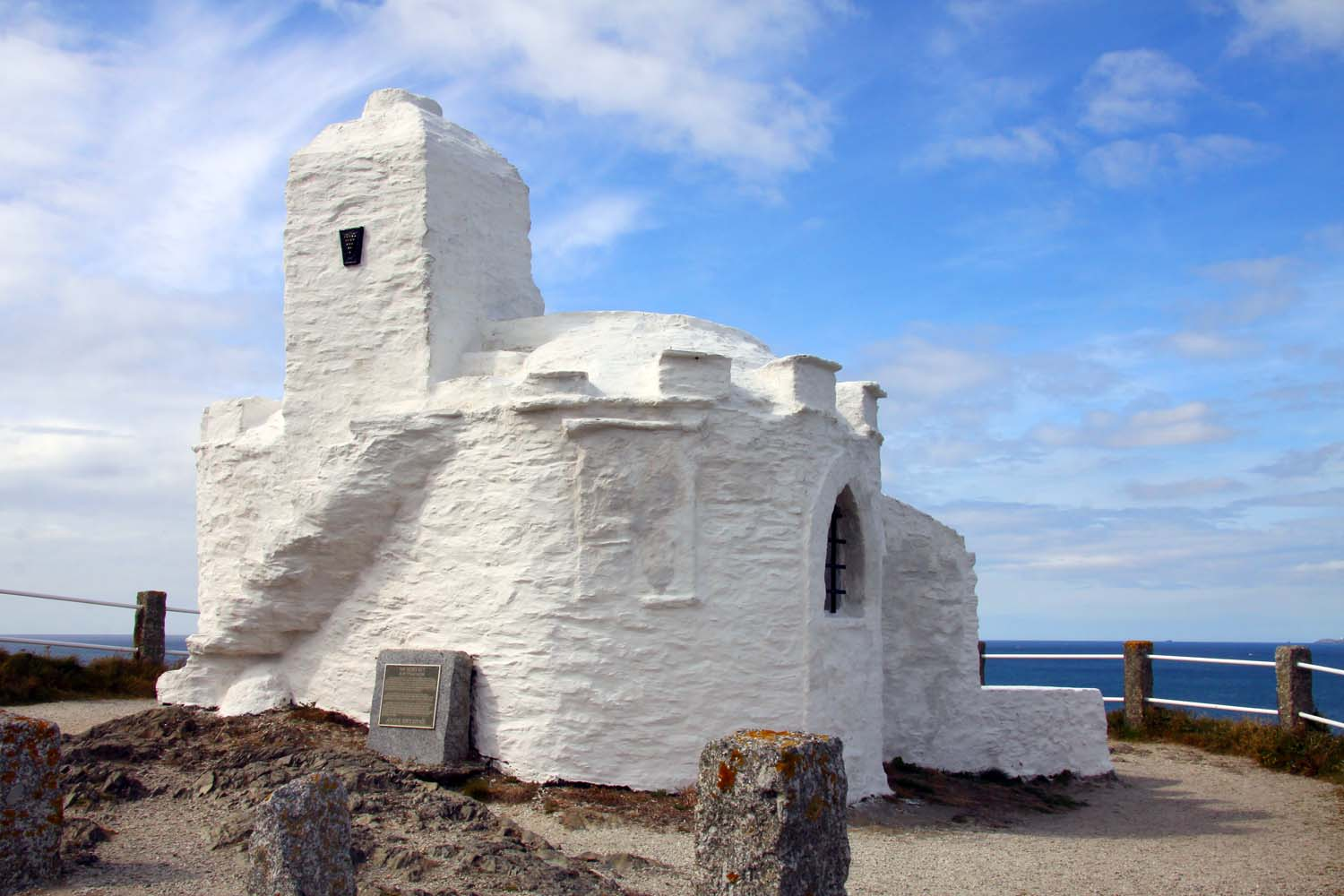
Huer's Hut on the headland of Towan Head

In Cornwall fishing customs, a conder, also called a huer or bulker, was a person who stood on high places near the sea coast in times of herring-fishing to signal to the fishers which way the shoal of herrings or pilchards passed—their course being more discernible to those who stand on high cliffs, due to the blue colour they cause in the water, than to those aboard vessels. In Cornwall, the huer would shout 'Hevva!, Hevva!' to alert the boats to the location of the pilchard shoals.

The term was also used to refer to the raised location where a conder stood.

== See also ==
- Sardines as food
