= Grade II* listed buildings in Cornwall =

Cornwall shown within England

There are over 20,000 Grade II* listed buildings in England. As the county of Cornwall contains 586 of these sites they have been split into alphabetical order.

- Grade II* listed buildings in Cornwall (A–G)
- Grade II* listed buildings in Cornwall (H–P)
- Grade II* listed buildings in Cornwall (Q–Z)

== See also ==
- Grade I listed buildings in Cornwall
