= Camborne and Redruth Tramways =

Tramway operator in England

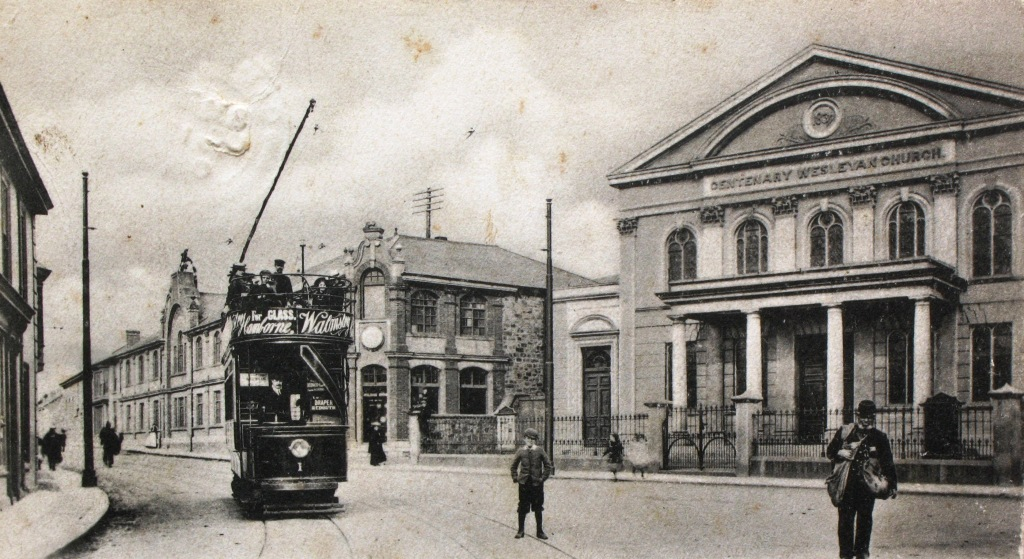
- Car 1 in Camborne

Operation
- Locale: Camborne, Redruth
- Open: 7 November 1902
- Close: August 1934
- Status: Closed

Infrastructure
- Track gauge: 3 ft 6 in (1,067 mm)
- Propulsion system: Electric
- Depot: Carn Brea

Statistics
- Route length: 3.7 miles (6.0 km)
Overview
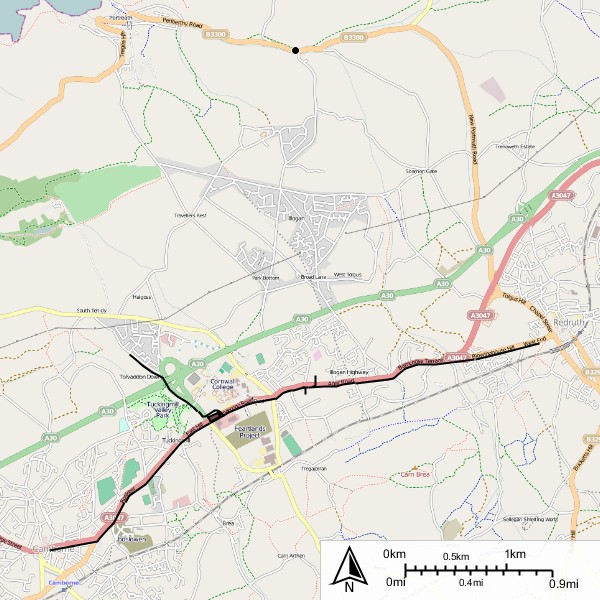

The Camborne and Redruth Tramways company operated an electric freight and passenger tramway service in the Cornish towns of Camborne and Redruth between 1902 and 1934.

== History ==
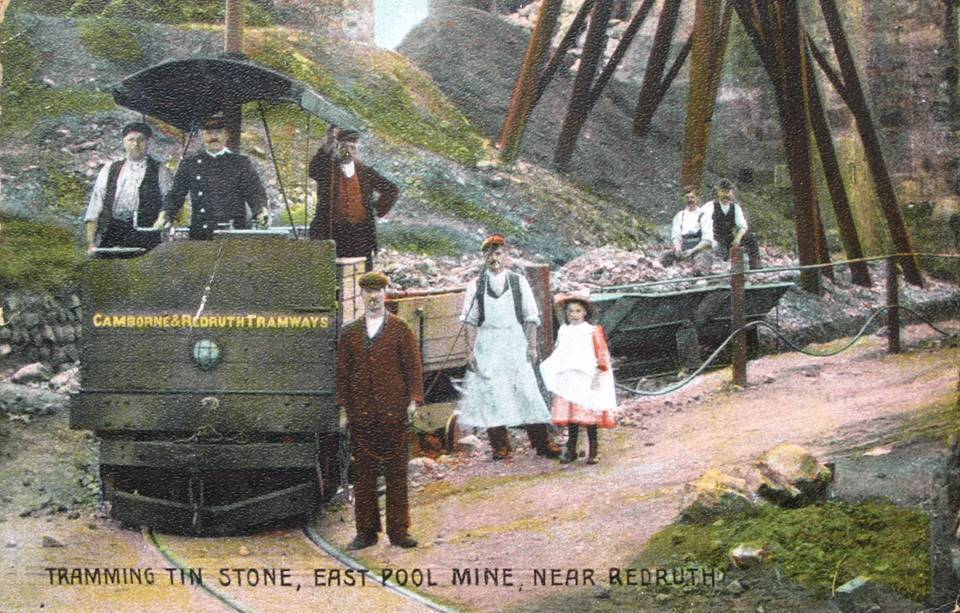
A mineral train at East Pool Mine

The proposal for Camborne and Redruth, put forward by the Urban Electric Supply Company, was for a combined lighting scheme and tramway. The Urban Electric Supply Company was a subsidiary of Edmundson's Electricity Corporation.

It was authorised by the Camborne and Redruth Tramway Order 1900. The construction of the generating station and distribution system cost £38,500 (equivalent to £4,091,000 in 2025) and the tramway and vehicles cost £35,000 (equivalent to £3,719,000 in 2025). The tramway was constructed by Dick, Kerr & Co. in around 6 months. Track-laying started on 7 April 1902, and the network was single-tracked with eight passing loops and double tracks at each end. The sharpest curve was 40 ft radius and the steepest section on East Hill was 1:15.

It was mostly complete by September 1902. Members of Camborne and Redruth councils visited on 1 October 1902. The first trial run of the system took place on Wednesday 8 October 1902, with a delegation of local dignitaries invited by the company manager Mr. F. C. Hanning The trial car arrived at the Camborne terminus at 11.30am driven by the manager, accompanied by William Ward, the electrical engineer. The West Briton and Cornwall Advertiser for 9 October 1902 reported that

those passengers who caught hold of a certain brass rod, to get on to the car, experienced a mild electric shock, the effect of which caused them to quickly release their hold, and this brought a smile to the face of Engineer Ward.

The Board of Trade inspector passed the tramway for use on 25 October 1902. The formal opening was held on 7 November 1902 when Mrs. Wigham, wife of an Edmundson's director was the guest of honour.

The tramway opened for passenger service on 7 November 1902, and for freight in May 1903.

Vehicles were obtained from G. F. Milnes & Co. in 1902 and 1903, and comprised 6 open top double deck cars (48-seaters), 2 single-deck cars (34-seaters) plus 2 freight locomotives. The company livery was dark green and cream. Between 7 November 1902 and 30 September 1903 the passenger service carried one million passengers.

The freight locomotives moved 12 side-tipping mineral ore wagons on the tramway from East Pool mine.

== Closure ==
Around 1926, the Cornish Motor Transport Company inaugurated a 15-minute bus service between Redruth and Camborne, which reduced the patronage of the passenger tram service. Despite a reduction in fares and an amended service, it was not commercially viable and the service closed to passengers on 29 September 1927. The freight services continued.

In August 1934 the freight service of tin ore was replaced by an aerial ropeway.
