= St Austell Market House =

Municipal building in St Austell, Cornwall, England

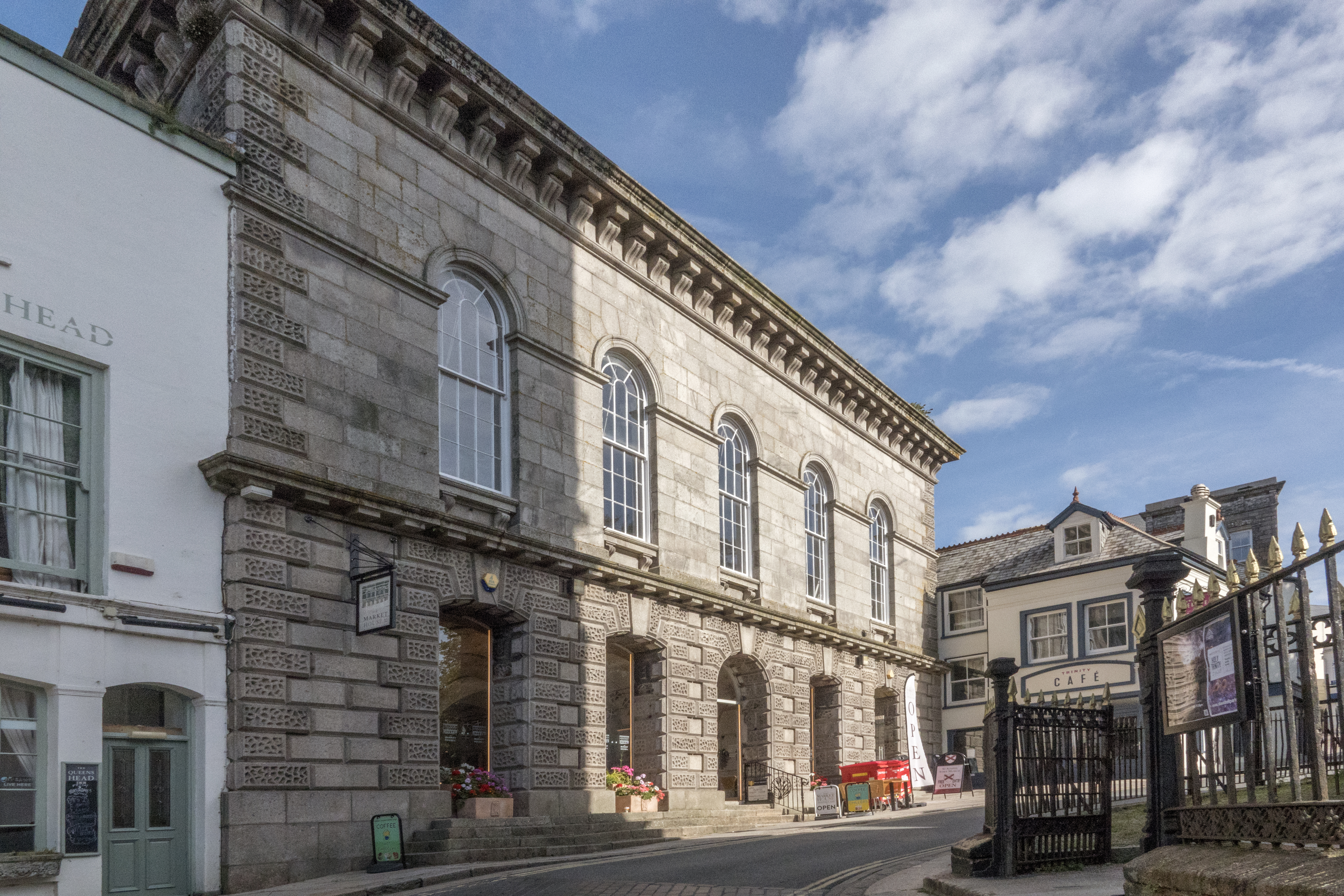
- The building in 2023

- Shown in Cornwall
- 50.3388°N 4.7924°W
- Location: Market Street, St Austell, Cornwall, England

History
- Built: 1844

Site notes
- Architect: Christopher Eales
- Architectural style: Italianate style

Listed Building – Grade II*
- Official name: Old town hall and court house
- Designated: 11 March 1974
- Reference no.: 1289697

St Austell Market House is a municipal building in St Austell, a town in Cornwall, in England. The structure, which accommodates a series of boutique shops, is a Grade II* listed building.

== History ==
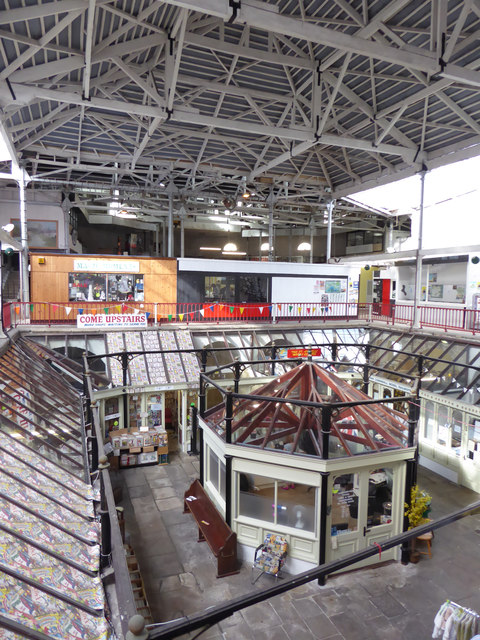
The interior of the building, in 2016

The first market house in St Austell was an ancient building commissioned by the Mays family in 1638. A second town hall was erected in 1791, but by the early 1840s, it was considered too small. One of the last meetings in the old market hall was organised by Isaac Latimer of Truro, the agent for the Colonisation Commissioners for South Australia, in August 1839, to encourage impoverished local people to emigrate to South Australia.

The site that civic leaders selected for the new market hall was occupied by the King's Arms Inn. The foundation stone for the new building was laid by the lord of the manor, Charles Graves-Sawle, of Penrice House, in 1842. It was designed by Christopher Eales in the Italianate style, built by Oliver Stone & Sons of Falmouth in granite from Trethurgy at a cost of £7,000, and was completed in 1844.

In the front section of the building, there was a vaulted entrance hall on the ground floor and there was a large assembly room on the first floor, which served as St Austell Town Hall. The ground floor of the main market hall behind provided space for stalls for the sale of farm produce at the front, and for the sale of meat in the centre. The first floor of the main market hall hosted stalls selling fruit, vegetables, poultry, butter, and general goods. A gallery above the rear of the first floor initially served as a corn exchange. The complex also accommodated two police cells.

The magistrates swore in 90 special constables in the town hall as they planned their response to the St Austell bread riots, during which local labourers looted the local bread shops, in June 1847. The high sheriff, Nicholas Kendall, who was supported by a detachment from the 5th (Northumberland Fusiliers) Regiment of Foot, read the riot act outside the building and 14 members of the public were arrested before the crowd dispersed.

The former Prime Minister, William Ewart Gladstone, addressed a large crowd about Home Rule in the building in June 1889, and the future Prime Minister, Winston Churchill, gave a speech about free trade there in January 1910. Although the market house was a regular venue for public meetings, after an urban district council was formed in 1894, municipal offices were established in Truro Road.

The town hall on the first floor was used as a cinema during the First World War. After the war, it became a dance hall, and a sprung wooden floor was installed. Later in the 20th century, it became the regional headquarters of the Amalgamated Engineering Union, then Evans' Hardware Store. The gallery spent some time as a fire station.

St Austell Market Common Interest Company, established in 2007, acquired ownership of the complex in 2008. A limited programme of restoration works costing £180,000, involving the restoration of the arches and floors in the vaulted entrance hall, was completed in January 2022. The owners have confirmed plans to refurbish the roof, and to re-open the town hall as a community events space.

== Architecture ==
The building is constructed of granite, with slate roofs. It has a large and irregular plan, but is broadly five bays wide and three bays deep. The main frontage, facing onto Market Street, is symmetrical and vermiculated on the ground floor. It features five openings, the centre of which is rounded headed and the rest are segmental headed, all with keystones and voussoirs. The first floor is fenestrated by five round headed sash windows with window sills. The quoins are also vermiculated and, at roof level, the eaves are heavily modillioned. Internally, the front section is vaulted on the ground floor, and the town hall above has a sprung wooden floor. Behind the front section, there are lean-to shops in the main market hall, which is open on three sides at first floor level. The roof, which is supported by cast iron columns, may have been the largest single-span wooden roof in Europe when built.

The building is described by Historic England as "one of the best market halls in the country, with good elevations and an exciting interior". It was grade II* listed in 1974.

== See also ==
- Grade II* listed buildings in Cornwall (H–P)
