= Huer's Hut =

Building in Cornwall, England

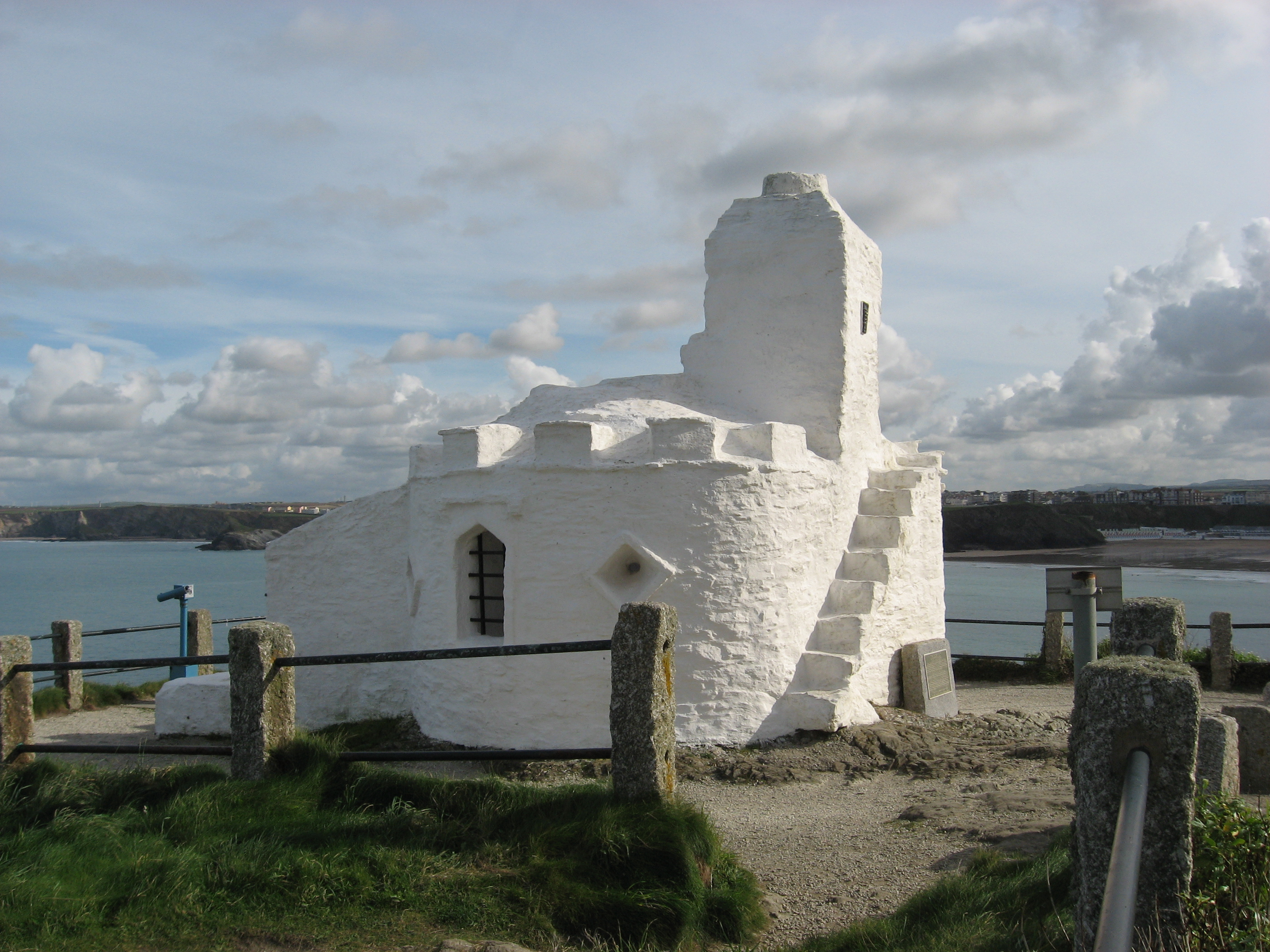
- South-west elevation
- Interactive map of Huer's Hut
- 50.4203°N 5.0890°W
- Location: Newquay, Cornwall

History
- Built: 14th century 18th century (current structure)

Site notes
- Owner: Cornwall Council

Listed Building – Grade II*
- Official name: Huer's House
- Designated: 24 October 1951
- Reference no.: 1144136

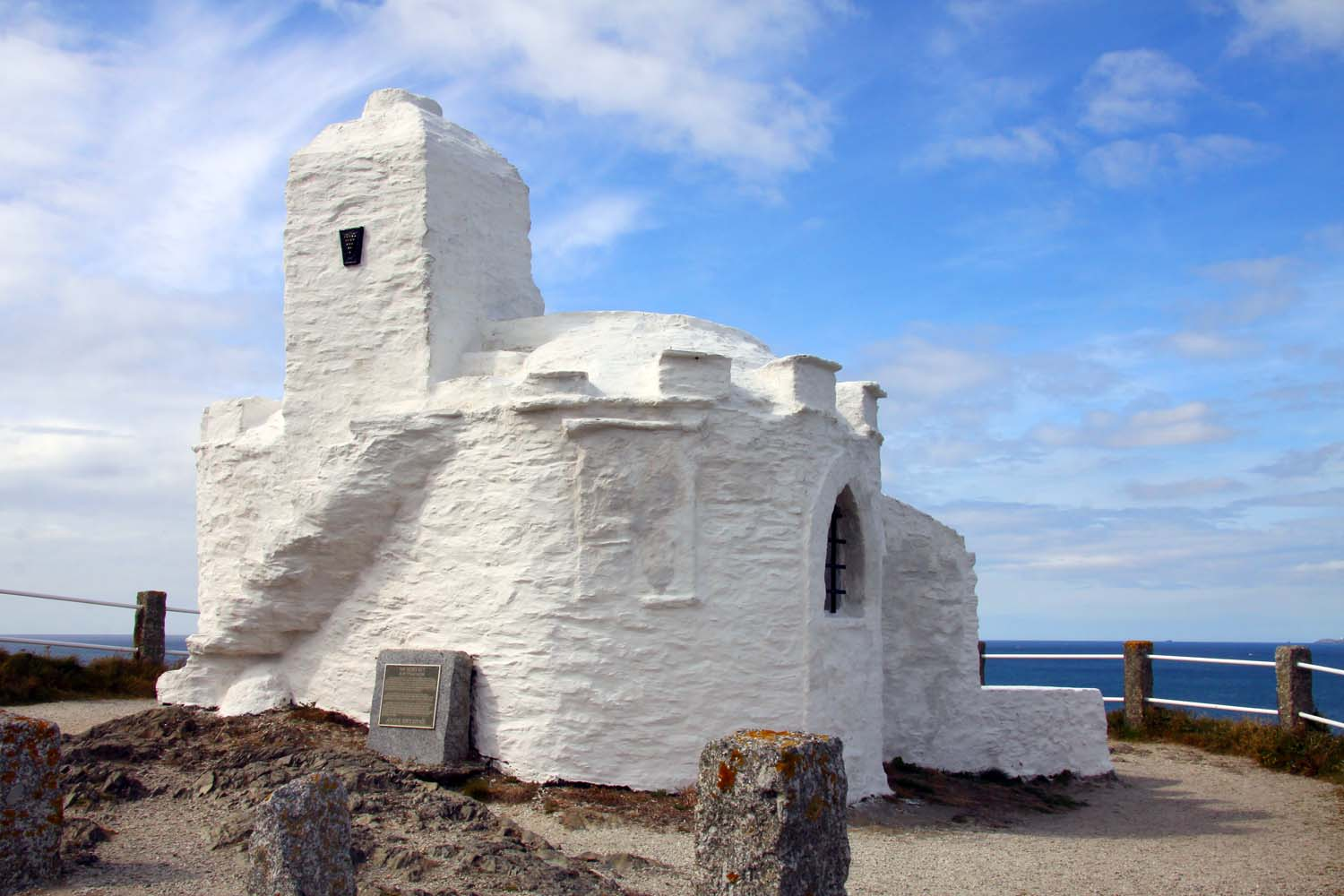
South-east elevation

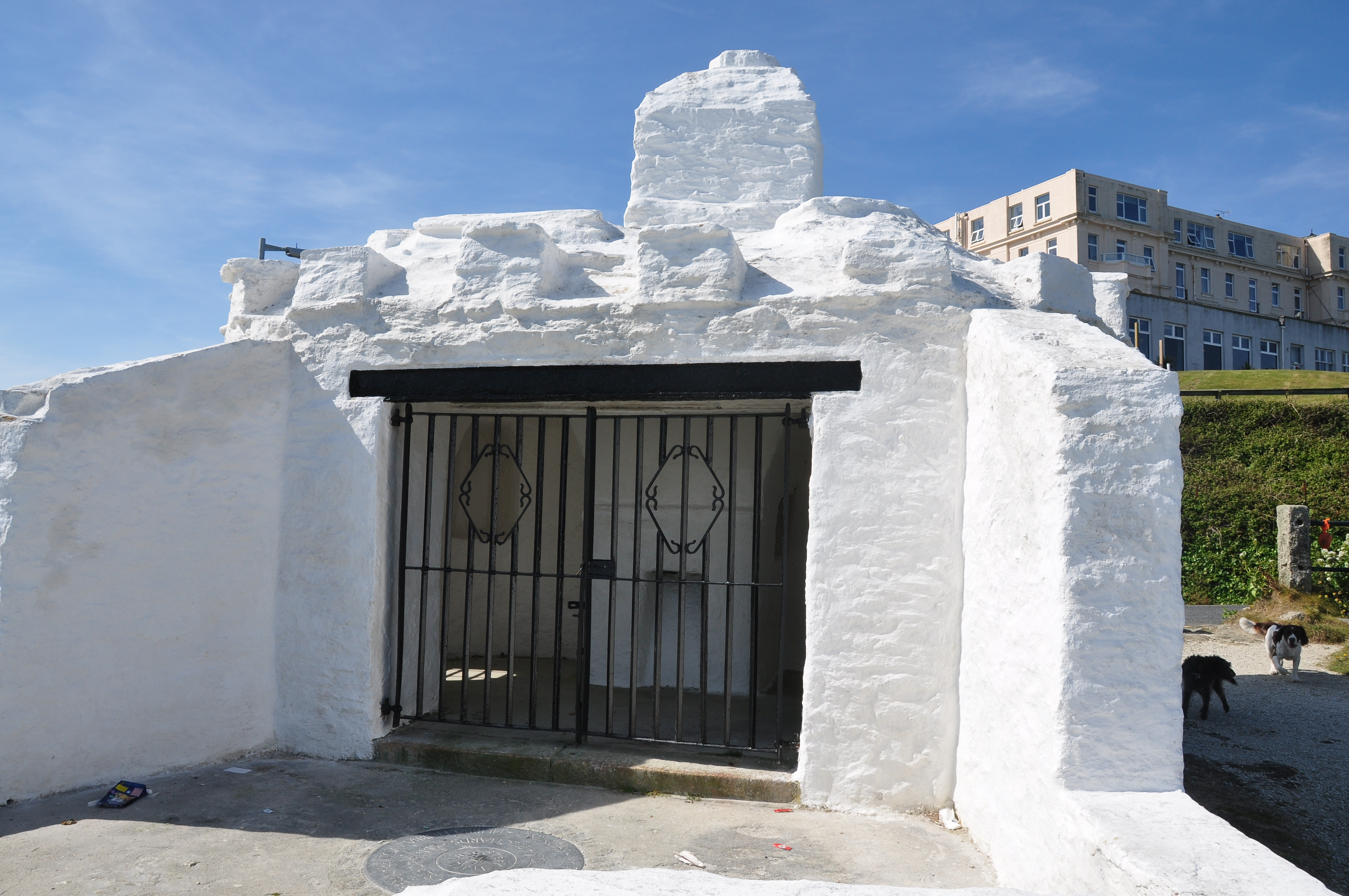
Sea-facing (north) part of structure

The Huer's Hut is a listed building in Newquay, Cornwall, England. It may date from the 14th century and have originally seen use as a hermitage and lighthouse. By the 16th century it was used as a lookout point for the seasonal arrival of pilchards in the bay. A man known as a huer would signal the arrival of the pilchards and direct fishermen towards them. The structure was in the ownership of Cornwall Council and was subject to restoration work in 2014. It is now on a lifelong lease to Newquay Town Council.

== History ==
European pilchard (sardine) fishing was a major industry in Cornwall and the neighbouring county of Devon from the 16th century. A great quantity of fish were exported to the Mediterranean countries, where they were popular during times of fast such as Lent when Catholics abstained from the consumption of meat. In England the obligation to fast was relaxed after the English Reformation and consumption of fish dropped; it was therefore well placed to supply countries such as Italy which were not self-sufficient in fish. Pilchards are migratory fish and in the 16th century vast schools of young fish would approach the coastline at Land's End in mid-July. The fish would progress gradually eastwards along the north coast of Cornwall and Devon. There was, therefore, a short period in which the fish could be caught en masse by nets cast from boats in shallow waters.

The Huer's Hut at Newquay, Cornwall served as a lookout point from which a man known as a huer could keep watch for the arrival of the pilchards. They could be discerned by the water turning a dark reddish-brown and by the flocks of seagulls which dived down to feed on the fish. The huer would announce the arrival by shouting "hevva, hevva" or through the use of a trumpet after which he would direct the townsfolk to the fish by waving tree branches above his head. The word huer has the same derivation as the "hue" in hue and cry, after this action.

The Huer's Hut at Newquay has been described as "a particularly fine late mediaeval specimen". The listed building description states that the current structure dates from the late 18th and early 19th centuries, though a plaque on the structure claims 14th-century origins. The plaque also states that the structure may have been used at an earlier time as a hermitage and lighthouse.

The structure was restored in 1836, at which point the fireplace may have been significantly altered. It received protection as a listed building (under the name "Huer's House") on 24 October 1951 and is currently categorised as grade II*.

In 1967 it featured in a sequence intended for The Beatles' television special Magical Mystery Tour, but which never made the final cut, entitled 'Nat's Dream' and which was directed by John Lennon.

== Description ==
The Huer's Hut is a one-storey circular structure with walls made from stone rubble. An external staircase leads to a stone roof that is battlemented. There is a large opening on the sea-facing north wall flanked by splayed projecting walls. There is a triangular-headed window in the centre of the west face with two smaller, diamond-shaped openings on either side. The eastern face contains a pointed-arch window with a raised surround flanked by another diamond-shaped opening and a large, blocked-up, mullioned window. All the windows in the structure are unglazed and the northern opening, which acts as a doorway, is secured with metal gates. There is a fireplace in the centre of the structure with a single stack chimney. The building is constructed of local killas stone and lime mortar. The whole structure is further coated in lime and sand render and painted with limewash.

== Restoration ==
By the early 21st century the structure had been damaged by exposure to wind and rain. The structure's owner, Cornwall Council, now leased to Newquay Town Council, with funding from a campaign headed by local man Jon Goodman who ran a Crowdfunding campaign including a £8,000 contribution from television presenter Phillip Schofield who grew up in Newquay, undertook restoration works after public pressure. These were completed on 19 December 2014 at a total cost of £30,000. The money left over from the crowdfunding campaign has been used to pay for ongoing maintenance. Funding was also received through small change which was tossed through the openings of the structure. This change has been stolen through the use of fishing nets and in October 2016 the gate lock was broken to gain access to the money.
