= Magnetic separation =

Process of separating components of mixtures by using magnets

Magnetic separation is the process of separating components of mixtures by using a magnet to attract magnetic substances. The process that is used for magnetic separation separates non-magnetic substances from those which are magnetic. This technique is useful for the select few minerals which are ferromagnetic (iron-, nickel-, and cobalt-containing minerals) and paramagnetic. Most metals, including gold, silver and aluminum, are nonmagnetic.

A large diversity of mechanical means are used to separate magnetic materials. During magnetic separation, magnets are situated inside two separator drums which bear liquids. Due to the magnets, magnetic particles are being drifted by the movement of the drums. This can create a magnetic concentrate (e.g. an ore concentrate).

== History ==
Michael Faraday discovered that when a substance is put in a magnetic environment, the intensity of the environment is modified by it. With this information, he discovered that different materials can be separated with their magnetic properties. The table below shows the common ferromagnetic and paramagnetic minerals as well as the field intensity that is required in order to separate those minerals.

Common Ferromagnetic and Paramagnetic Minerals
	Mineral	Formula	Field Strength (kG)
Ferromagnetic	Magnetite	$\ce{Fe3O4}$	1
Ferromagnetic	Pyrrhotite	$\ce{Fe7S8}$	0.5 - 4
Paramagnetic	Ilmenite	$\ce{FeTiO3}$	8 - 16
Paramagnetic	Siderite	$\ce{FeCO3}$	9 - 18
Paramagnetic	Chromite	$\ce{FeCr2O4}$	10 - 16
Paramagnetic	Hematite	$\ce{Fe2O3}$	12 - 18
Paramagnetic	Wolframite	$\ce{(Fe,Mn)WO4}$	12 - 18
Paramagnetic	Tourmaline		16 - 20

In the 1860s, magnetic separation started to become commercialized. It was used to separate iron from brass. After the 1880s, ferromagnetic materials started to be magnetically separated. Among others, Thomas Edison tried to commercialize the magnetic enrichment of poor iron ores but failed. In the 1900s, high intensity magnetic separation was inaugurated which allowed the separation of pragmatic materials.

After the Second World War, systems that were the most common were electromagnets. The technique was used in scrap yards. Magnetic separation was developed again in the late 1970s with new technologies being inaugurated. The new forms of magnetic separation included magnetic pulleys, overhead magnets and magnetic drums.

In mines where wolframite was mixed with cassiterite, such as South Crofty and East Pool mine in Cornwall or with bismuth such as at the Shepherd and Murphy mine in Moina, Tasmania, magnetic separation is used to separate the ores. At these mines, a device called a Wetherill's Magnetic Separator (invented by John Price Wetherill, 1844–1906) was used. In this machine, the raw ore, after calcination was fed onto a conveyor belt which passed underneath two pairs of electromagnets under which further belts ran at right angles to the feed belt. The first pair of balls was weakly magnetized and served to draw off any iron ore present. The second pair were strongly magnetized and attracted the wolframite, which is weakly magnetic. These machines were capable of treating 10 tons of ore a day.

== Common applications ==
Magnetic separation can also be used in electromagnetic cranes that separate magnetic material from scraps and unwanted substances. This explains its use for shipment equipments and waste management. Unwanted metals can be removed from goods with this technique. It keeps all materials pure. Recycling centres use magnetic separation often to separate components from recycling, isolate metals, and purify ores. Overhead magnets, magnetic pulleys, and the magnetic drums were the methods used in the recycling industry.

Magnetic separation is also useful in mining iron as it is attracted to a magnet.

Another application, not widely known but very important, is to use magnets in process industries to remove metal contaminants from product streams. This takes a lot of importance in food or pharmaceutical industries.

Magnetic separation is also used in situations where pollution needs to be controlled, in chemical processing, as well as during the benefaction of nonferrous low-grade ores.

Magnetic separation is also used in the following industries: dairy, grain and milling, plastics, food, chemical, oils, textile, and more. N52 magnets are used in magnetic separation for food processing, recycling, and manufacturing. They improve food safety, enhance recycling quality, and protect equipment in manufacturing, ensuring efficiency and high standards across these industries.

== Magnetic cell separation ==
Magnetic cell separation is on the rise. It is currently being used in clinical therapies, more specifically in cancers and hereditary diseases researches. Magnetic cell separation took a turn when, Zborowski, an Immunomagnetic Cell Separation (IMCS) pioneer, analyzed commercial magnetic cell separation. Zborowski uncovered crucial revelations that were then used, and are still used today, in the human understanding of cell biology. Today, the manufacture of therapeutic products concerning cancers and genetic diseases, are being innovated due to these discoveries.

== In microbiology ==
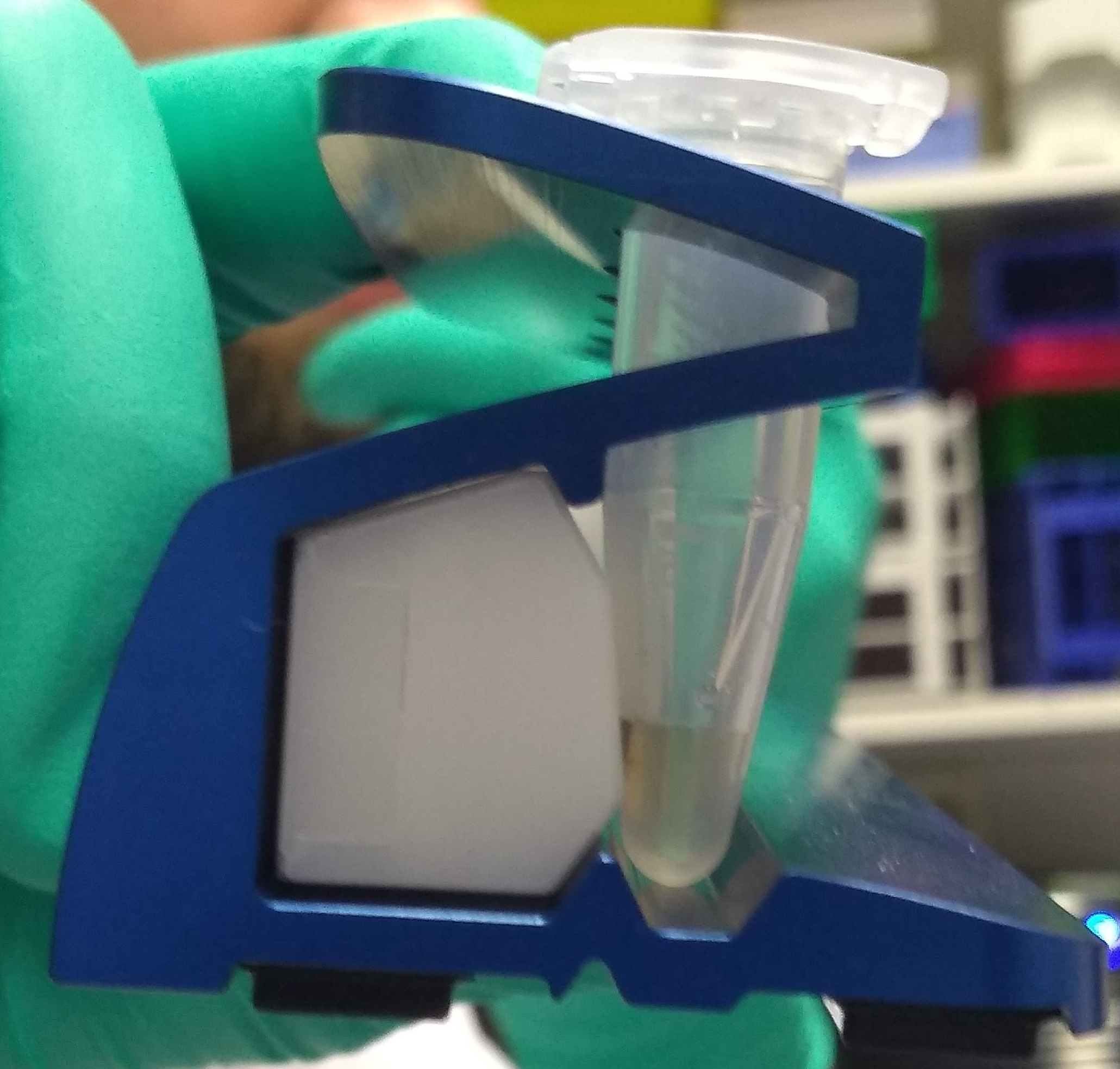
DNA purification using a GE MagRack 6 and magnetic beads with a coating that attaches to the substance of interest. The beads are visible accumulated on the top left of the solution surface.

Magnetic separation techniques are also used in microbiology. In this case, binding molecules and antibodies are used in order to isolate specific viable organisms, nucleic acids, or antigens. This technology helps isolating bacterial species to identify and give diagnostics of genes targeting certain organisms. When magnetic separation techniques are combined with PCR (polymerase chain reaction), the results increase in sensitivity and specificity.

== Low-field magnetic separation ==
Low-field magnetic separation is often in environmental contexts such as water purification and the separation of complex mixtures. Low magnetic field gradients are field gradients that are smaller than one hundred tesla per meter. Monodisperse magnetite ($\ce{Fe3O4}$) and nanocrystals ($\ce{NCs}$) are used for this technique.

Magnetic filters are fitted on the boiler's pipework to collect magnetite from the circulating water before it has a chance to build up and lower the efficiency of the heating system. The water circulating around the heating system picks up bits of sludge (or magnetite) which can build up. The magnetic filter attracts all these bits of debris with a strong magnet as the water flows around it, preventing a build-up of sludge in the pipework or in the boiler.

== Weak magnetic separation ==
Weak magnetic separation is used to create cleaner iron-rich products that can be reused. These products have low levels of impurities and a high iron load. This technique is used as a recycling technology. It is coupled with steelmaking slag fines as well as a selection of particle size screening.

== Magnetic Separation Force Calculations ==
It can be shown that magnetic force per unit volume on a permeable particle with relative permeability mu sub (pr) is proportional to the spatial gradient of the square of the magnetic flux density. The formula can be used in magnetic finite element analysis software to compute force densities on a wide variety of practical examples, obtaining results agreeing with Oberteuffer's paper.
