= Grylls Monument =

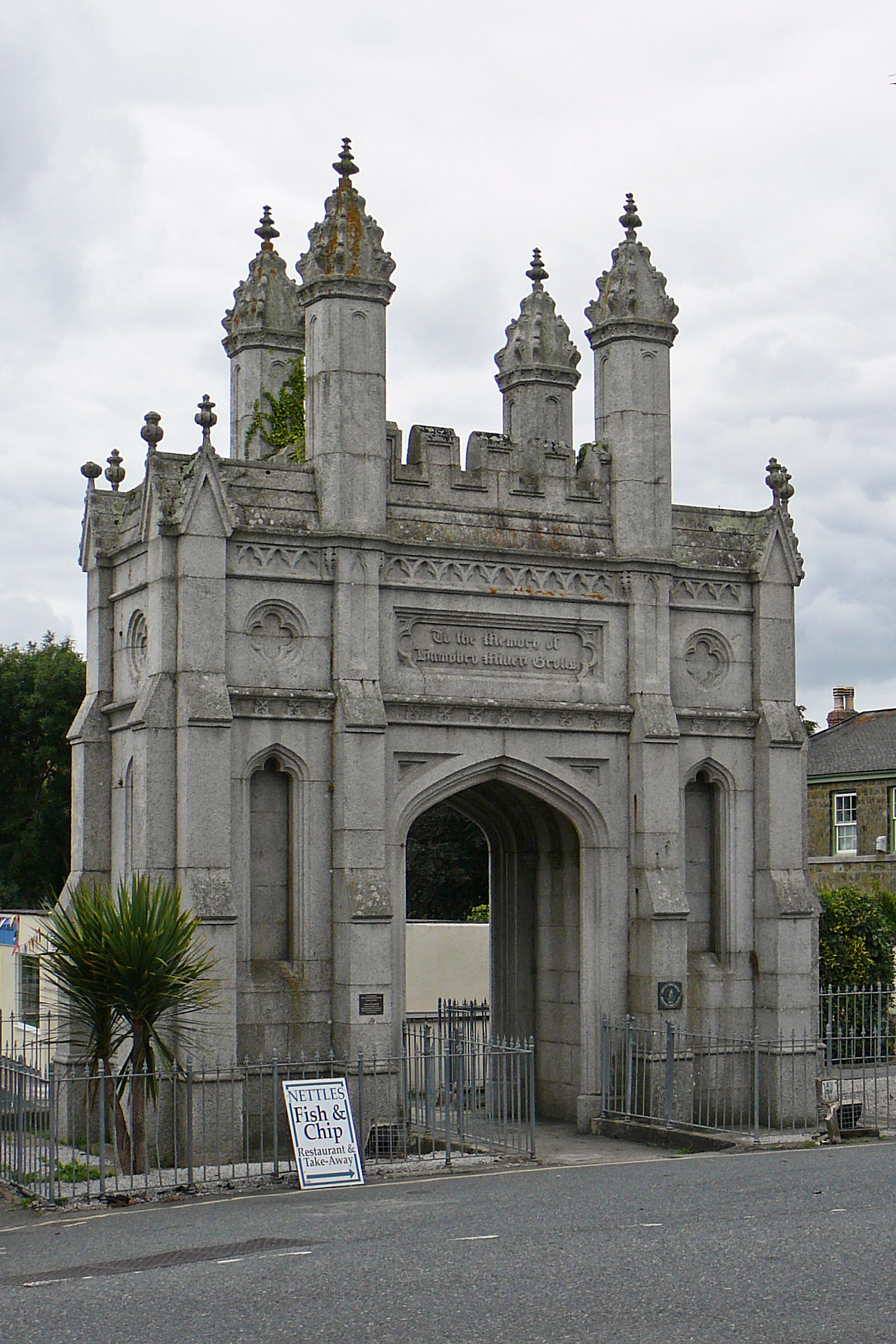
- Pictured in 2010

- Location within Cornwall

General information
- Location: Helston, Cornwall
- Coordinates: 50°06′01″N 05°16′39″W
- Opened: 1834

Listed Building – Grade II*
- Official name: Monument to H M Grylls
- Designated: 22 May 1972
- Reference no.: 1196470

The Grylls Monument in Helston, Cornwall, is designated by Historic England as a Grade II* listed building. It is dedicated to Humphry Millet Grylls, a businessman who had kept a local tin mine, Wheal Vor, open through a period of recession, safeguarding 1,200 jobs. The monument was funded by public subscription, and built in 1834. The monument is built out of granite ashlar in a Gothic style, and provides a gateway into a bowling green.

== History ==
Wheal Vor was established in the summer of 1810 by two brothers, John (1771-1834) and Thomas (1769-by 1844) Gundry of Goldsithney. They acquired a large interest in the company, purchasing shares using money they had earned from another of their mines: Wheal Neptune.

By 1819, the other shareholders in Wheal Vor had become discontented with the Gundries, who had failed to produce the mines accounts when requested, amongst other incompetencies. The view gradually spread that the Gundries would have to go. The bankruptcy of all of them, by suing them for the mine's debts, and the formation of a new company, was clearly the only sure way of making them release their grip on the mine.

On 20 January 1820, the Gundries, having failed to repay debts, were declared bankrupt. Between 25 and 23 February, Humphry Millet Grylls (1790–1834), a local solicitor and banker, and a recently appointed member of the committee set up to manage Wheal Vor, John Gilbert Plomer, solicitor, and Charles Read, all of Helston, were appointed assignees of the Gundry's estate and effects. On 18 February Grylls and Read relinquished the Gundries' shares in Wheal Vor, without first offering them publicly for sale, and without obtaining the agreement of the creditors or of the shareholders, in itself conduct of doubtful legality. Having done this, Grylls then indemnified Read against any liability arising from the relinquishment. The asset value of the Gundries' 622 shares was some £5,990, or about £9.12s.8d. per share.

The old Wheal Vor company was sold and a new one formed. The sale took place on 5 June 1820, and, for want of a better word, it was called an auction, though the only bidder was Humphry Millett Grylls on behalf of the adventurers in the new company and by agreement with those in the old company, who were almost identical. The mine ostensibly changed hands for £18,000 (approximately £1,500,000 in 2025 terms), though of this sum only £3,000 was in cash, the remaining £15,000 being represented by the 50 shares into which the new company was divided. This action kept the mine open, and safeguarded the jobs of around 1,200 people.

In July 1829 the Lord Chancellor, Lord Lyndhurst, ordered that all proceedings under the original Commissions of Bankrupt should be stayed, that new Commissions should forthwith issue, and that Grylls, Plomer and Read should no longer be assignees. He ordered them to refund a large sum to the bankrupts' estates for the value of the shares of which they had become possessed, and which, "by one of those changes which occur in mines", had become a valuable property. Renewed Commissions of Bankrupt were duly issued in August, and, following the appointment in October 1829 of Edmund Turner of Truro, a banker and later M.P. for Truro, and John Sherris Brown and John Batten of Penzance, the estates and effects of the Gundries were made over to them.

While the public disgrace of Grylls having been discharged from his position of assignee was still fairly fresh in everyone's minds, and with almost indecent haste, a collection was made for him in the summer of 1830. People in Helston and neighbourhood were invited to subscribe to a fund, with a maximum individual contribution of five shillings, to show their appreciation of his efforts in keeping Wheal Vor at work. Over two thousand people made donations, and at the end of September a dinner was given in Grylls' honour at the Star Inn, Helston, under the presidency of Charles Newsom Beater, purser and manager of several mines in Gwinear and Breage. The speeches at the dinner were reported at length in the local press and he was presented with a silver vase. Gratitude was uppermost in everyone's minds, for Grylls by his actions was instrumental in keeping Wheal Vor at work, and no reference was made to Grylls' misdeeds.

After his death in April 1834 a public subscription was started for the building of a monument in his memory.

== Architecture ==
The monument was designed by Richard Wightwick of Plymouth, and was subsequently listed as a grade II* building in 1972.
