= Lawrence House, Launceston =

National Trust property in Launceston, Cornwall, England

Lawrence House
- Location within Cornwall
- 50.638493°N 4.362249°W
- Location: Launceston, Cornwall, England

Listed Building – Grade II*
- Official name: Lawrence House and Museum and forecourt wall
- Designated: 27 February 1950
- Reference no.: 1206174

Lawrence House is a Georgian townhouse in Launceston, Cornwall. Built in 1753, the house is a National Trust property and a Grade II* listed building. It is leased to Launceston Town Council and used as a local museum.

== The house ==
Lawrence House is a Grade II* listed building being No 9 and 9a, Castle Street, Launceston, the house, the museum and the forecourt wall all being covered by the listing. The property was first listed on 27 February 1950 under the designation "Castle Street No.9 Lawrence House, The Mayor's Parlour and Borough Museum". John Betjeman described the street as "having the most perfect collection of 18th Century townhouses in Cornwall".

The property is a red brick town house laid to Flemish bond, with two storeys as well as a basement and an attic. The roof is slated and steep with red brick chimneys and the gable end of the cross wing is on the right. An inscription reads "1753" and "HL" and another on the right wing reads "1913". The upper storey has five windows, the right hand one being a Venetian window with moulded hood. The doorway is central and has a pedimented porch with pilasters and consoles, and the four-panel door has a fan window above. There are two original pedimented roof dormers, each with a 6-pane sash window. The interior has many original features including a grained basement staircase, panelling, plasterwork, moulded ceiling cornices and chimney-pieces.

Lawrence House is owned by the National Trust and leased to Launceston Town Council, who use it as a local museum and civic centre. The museum houses a collection of costumes from Victorian and more recent times on the first floor, and numerous exhibits and much information about the local history of the area on the ground floor. During the summer season, some of the exhibits are changed around at intervals to freshen the display. The museum is currently closed for repair. Admission is free.
