= East Pool mine =

Former metalliferous mine in Cornwall, UK

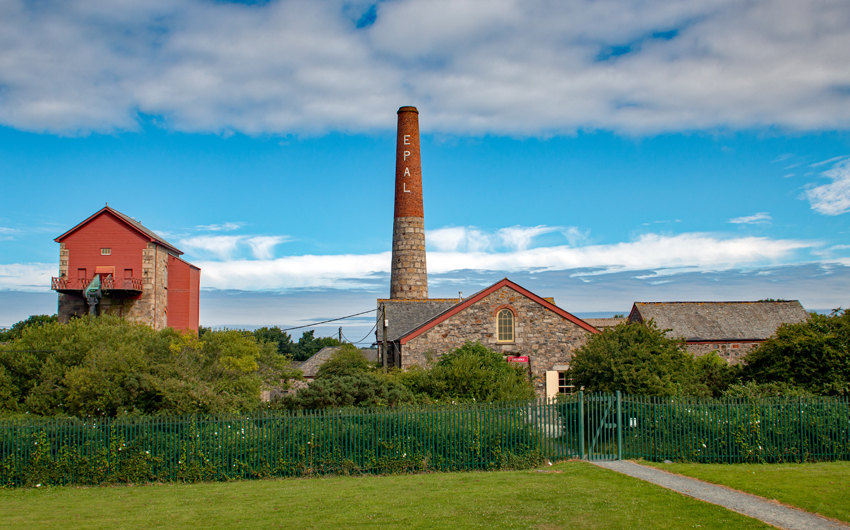
- The engine house and stack at Taylor's Shaft

- Location in Cornwall
- Location: Redruth, Cornwall, UK; 50°13′52″N 5°15′44″W
- Products: Copper, tin, arsenic and wolframite
- Opened: early 18th century
- Closed: 1945
- Company: National Trust
- Website: East Pool Mine

Scheduled monument
- Official name: East Pool Mine
- Designated: 3 September 2004
- Reference no.: 1021323

Listed Building – Grade II*
- Official name: Pump engine house at Taylor's Shaft of New East Pool Mine
- Designated: 9 April 1975
- Reference no.: 1142600

Listed Building – Grade II*
- Official name: Chimney stack approx. 30 metres east of pump engine house at Taylor's Shaft of New East Pool Mine
- Designated: 9 April 1975
- Reference no.: 1328183

Listed Building – Grade II
- Official name: East Pool Mine Engine House
- Designated: 12 September 1989
- Reference no.: 1160518

East Pool mine (later known as East Pool and Agar mine), was a metalliferous mine in the Camborne and Redruth mining area, just east of the village of Pool in Cornwall. Worked from the early 18th century until 1945, first for copper and later tin, it was very profitable for much of its life. Today the site has two preserved beam engines and is part of the Cornwall and West Devon Mining Landscape World Heritage Site. It is owned by the National Trust.

== Geology ==
The country rock at the mine is metamorphosed killas and greenstone overlying the Carn Brea granite. The many lodes on the sett are all crossed by several elvan dykes. The mine's main produce was copper and later tin, arsenic and wolframite, also small amounts of the ores of bismuth, cobalt and uranium.

== History to 1900 ==
East Pool mine started out in the early 18th century as a copper mine called "Pool Old Bal". The land under which it was allowed to mine (the "sett") was leased from the Basset family and it generated enough money for that family to build their country house at Tehidy. The mine's adit was 32 fathoms (192 ft; 59 m) below ground and mining had taken place 16 fathoms (96 ft; 29 m) below this, the workings being drained by a flatrod system powered by a water wheel south of Pool village. This phase of mining ceased in 1784.

The mine restarted as East Pool mine in 1834. Its small sett (about 900 by 400 yards) was bounded on the west by South Crofty and Tincroft mines, and on the south by the Carn Brea mines. On its north was Wheal Agar, with which it was later to merge. The mine had a very productive and long life, raising 91,000 long tons (92,000 t) of copper ore and, later, 46,000 long tons (47,000 t) of tin ore. In its early days the copper ore here was particularly rich, selling in 1835 for over £12 a long ton which was more than twice the average price at the time. This first profitable period lasted for ten years during which time a total of £32,256 dividends were paid on the 128 shares that had cost their owners a mere £5 each.

By 1843 the mine was employing 300 people and its deepest workings were at 90 fathoms (540 ft; 160 m). However, a slump in the later 1840s almost caused the closure of the mine and its workings became partly flooded, which jeopardised the neighbouring South Crofty mine. This caused Lady Basset to threaten to revoke the sett unless the mine was fully worked. The mine struggled on—one regular source of income was the monthly drainage charges totalling £60 that were paid by the neighbouring mines, including Wheal Agar—but it was not profitable again until 1854.

In 1860 a rich body of ore containing wolframite was discovered. This ore has a similar specific gravity to cassiterite and the normal methods used for separating the ore from gangue could not separate these two minerals. To solve this problem a Wetherill's Magnetic Separator, which could process 10 tons of ore per day, was installed.

East Pool was one of the few mines, along with South Crofty, Tincroft, Dolcoath and Wheal Basset and a few others, that were able to survive the depression of the Cornish mining industry in the late 19th century. All these mines were close to one another and pumping water from the workings was still of highest priority: if any of the pumping engines stopped there were serious repercussions at the other mines. Such was the problem of underground water that their winding (whim) engines were adapted to haul water by using self-tipping water-skips—this was done at East Pool in 1897. East Pool mine still had a problem with water coming from Wheal Agar, which was losing money at the time and kept threatening to switch off its pumps, which it did in late 1895. The productive lower levels of East Pool flooded, meaning that it was restricted to reworking its older higher levels. Negotiations between the two mines continued for over a year until, after the intervention of Lord Robartes, who owned the Wheal Agar land, East Pool purchased Wheal Agar and all its equipment for £4,000, taking possession on 10 March 1897.

== After 1900 ==
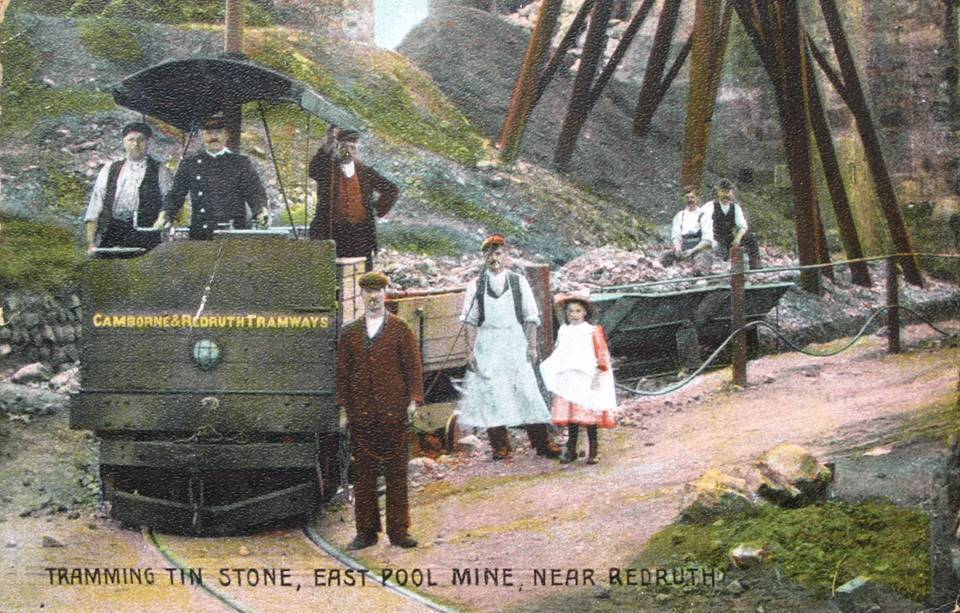
A train hauled by a Camborne & Redruth tram locomotive

Despite its problems, in almost every year from 1884 to 1913 more than 500 people were employed at the mine, with roughly half employed above ground and half underground. In 1913 the mine converted from a company that was run on the cost-book principle to a limited company called East Pool and Agar Ltd.

Since the 1860s, the mine had had an extensive ore processing plant located just over a mile to the east in the Red River valley at Tolvaddon, and from 1903 until August 1934 ore was transported there via a mineral tramway which used part of the track of the Camborne and Redruth Tramways, going through Pool village. After the tramway closed in 1934 the ore was carried by an aerial ropeway which ran directly across the countryside to the mill. This was a successful system that continued in use until the closure of the mine in 1945.

In 1921 there was a large rockfall underground which destroyed both of the mine's winding shafts, and caused flooding, so the next year a new shaft, named Taylor's Shaft after the mine manager, was started. In 1924 a notable 90-inch (2.3 m) pumping engine was installed at this shaft, having been moved from Carn Brea mine where it had lain unused since 1914. It was known as Harvey's Engine and had been designed by Nicholas Trestrail and built in 1892 by Harvey & Co. It pumped water from the mine using seven lifts of pumps of 18-and-16-inch (0.46 and 0.41 m) diameter. The 110-foot-tall (34 m) chimney stack for this engine's boilers was completed before the engine house was built. The unique feature of this stack, the vertical letters "EPAL" displayed in white bricks near the top, is still visible. As well as standing for "East Pool and Agar Limited", "EPAL" was also the brand name of the arsenic sold by the company.

The mine was taken over by its neighbour, South Crofty, and closed in 1945, but Harvey's Engine continued to pump water out of the South Crofty workings until 28 September 1954, when it was replaced by electrical pumps. It is likely that the Harvey's engine would have been scrapped were it not for the intervention of a Mr Greville Bathe of Florida, who purchased the engine and donated it to the Cornish Engines Preservation Committee, who gave it to the National Trust in 1967.

== Today ==
Today, the site is within area A5 (The Camborne & Redruth Mining District) of the Cornwall and West Devon Mining Landscape World Heritage Site, and two beam engines have been preserved here. Michell's Shaft Engine House (50.2280°N 5.2647°W) contains the last beam whim engine to be installed in Cornwall. It has a cylinder of 30 inches (0.76 m) diameter and was built in 1887 by Holman Brothers. It cost £675 and was designed to run at 27 strokes per minute and have a winding speed of 1,000 feet per minute (5.1 m/s). The engine was saved from being scrapped in 1941; it has been in the care of the National Trust since 1967 and since 1975 is still run on occasions.

At Taylor's Shaft the National Trust has an Industrial Discovery Centre which incorporates several buildings dating from the 1920s. One of these is the engine house still containing the 90-inch (2.3 m) Harvey's Engine, which was saved through a donation from an American benefactor.

== Gallery ==
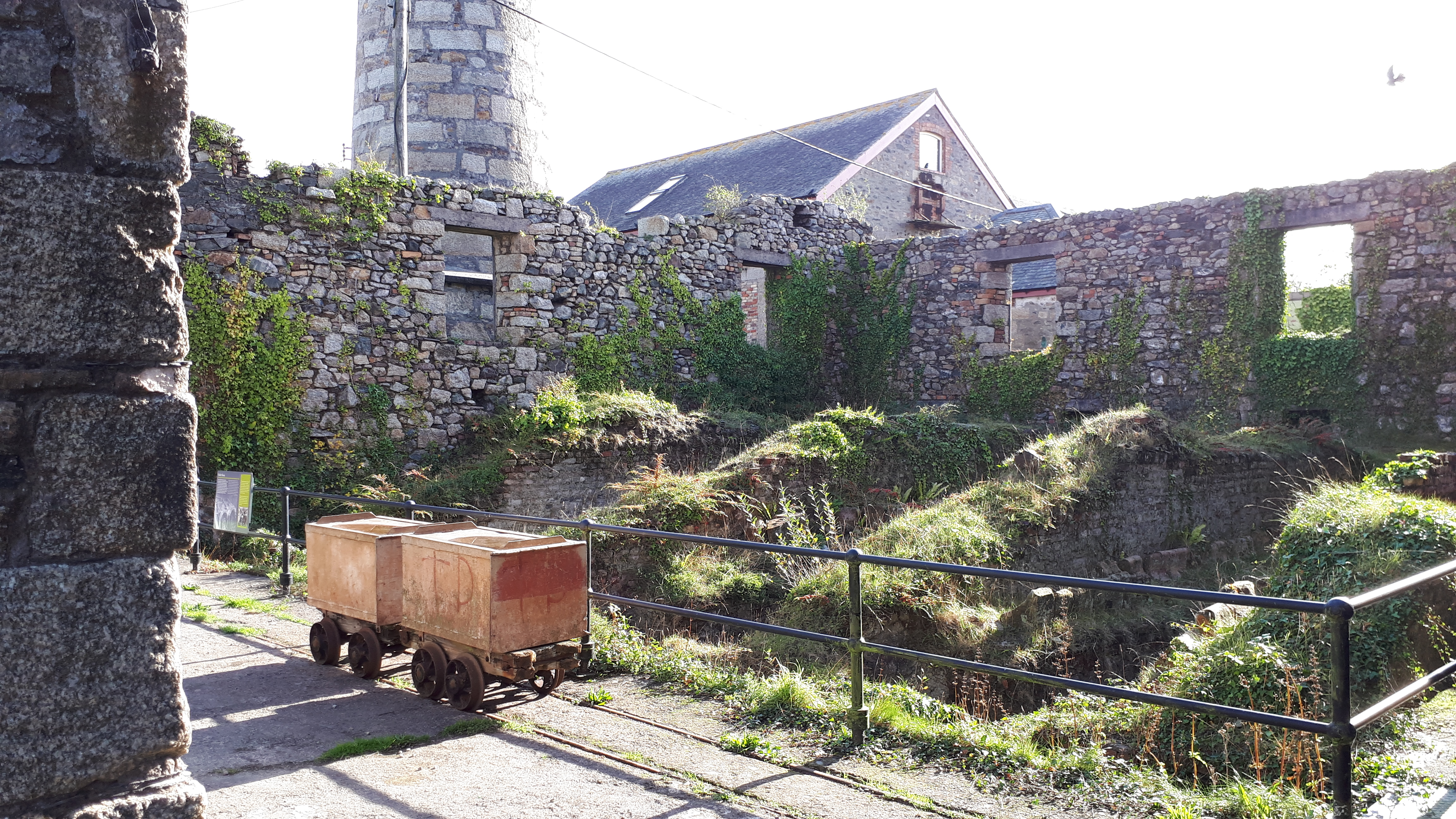
Taylor's shaft boilers

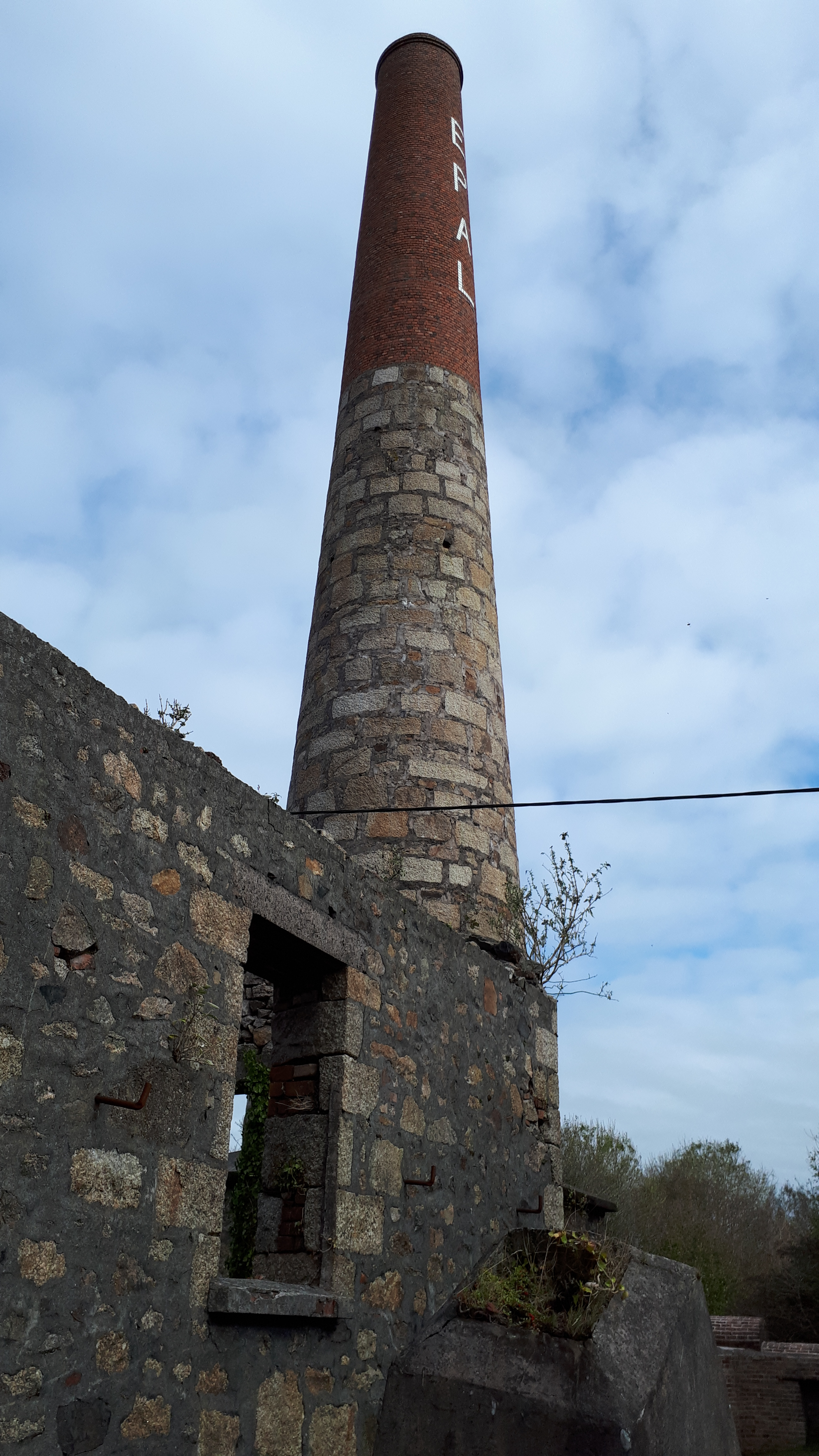
Taylor's shaft chimney

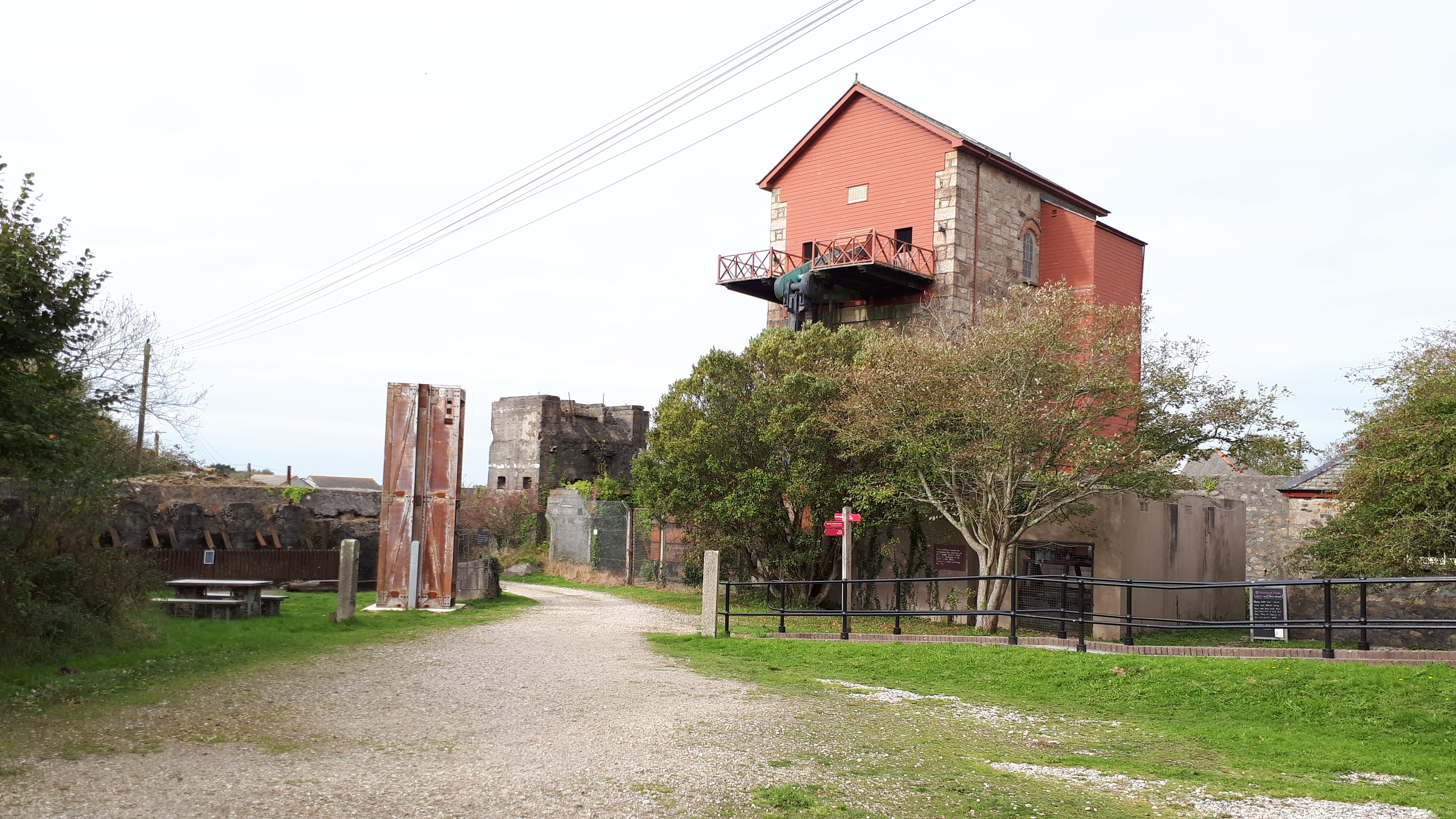
Breaker in the background

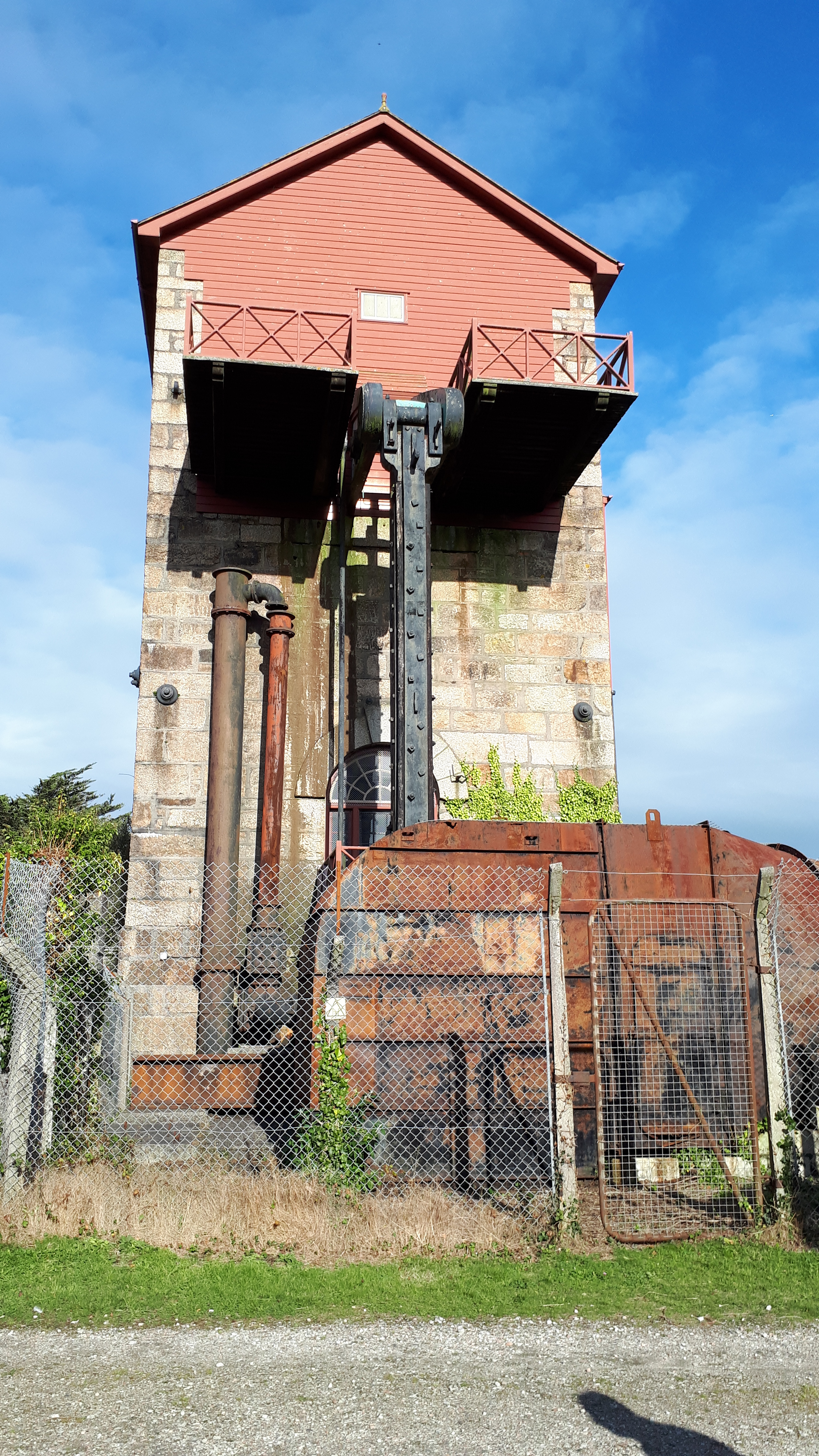
Taylor's shaft pump house

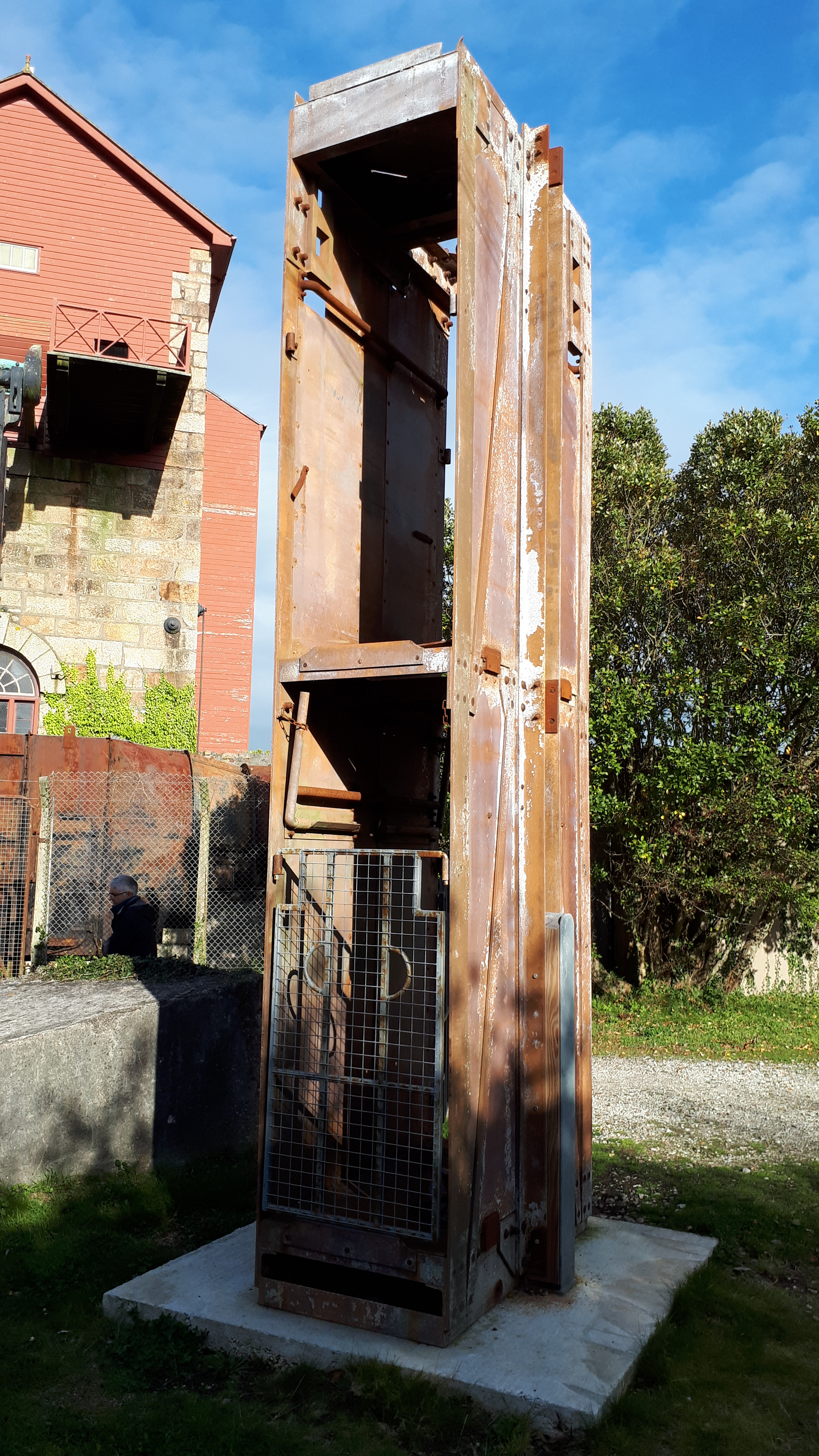
Taylor's shaft cage

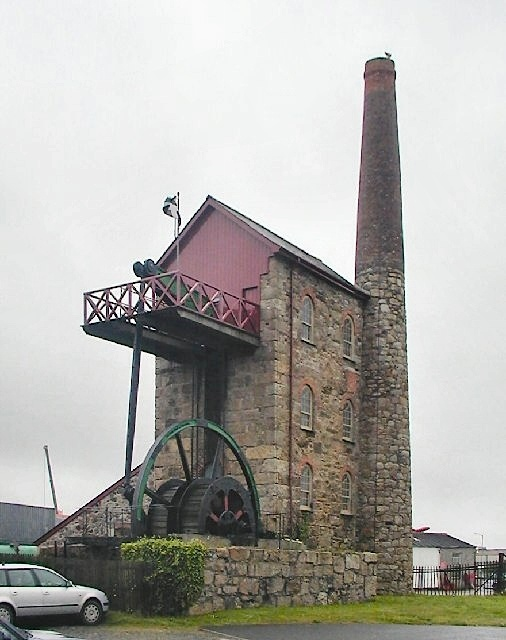
The engine house at Michell's Shaft

== See also ==
- Cornish steam engine
- Mining in Cornwall and Devon

== Sources ==
- Barton, D. B. (1966). The Cornish Beam Engine (New ed.). Truro: D. Bradford Barton Ltd.
- Burt, Roger; Waite, Peter; Burnley, Ray (1987). Cornish Mines: Metalliferous and Associated Minerals 1845–1913. University of Exeter. ISBN 0-85989-287-5.
  (The data for East Pool is available online at "Mining History Network .. Cornwall .. Sample Mine Data". University of Exeter.)
- Dines, H. G. (1956). The Metalliferous Mining Region of South-West England. Volume I. London: HMSO. pp. 326–333.
- Earl, Bryan (1994). Cornish Mining: The Techniques of Metal Mining in the West of England, Past and Present (2nd ed.). St Austell: Cornish Hillside Publications. ISBN 0-9519419-3-3.
- Hancock, Peter (2008). The Mining Heritage of Cornwall and West Devon. Wellington, Somerset: Halsgrove. ISBN 978-1-84114-753-6.
- Morrison, T. A. (1980). Cornwall's Central Mines: The Northern District 1810-1895. Penzance: Alison Hodge. pp. 142–167. ISBN 0-906720-10-9.
- Trounson, J. H.; Bullen, L. J. (1999). "East Pool and Agar Mine". Mining in Cornwall. Volume One: The Central District. Stroud: Tempus Publishing Ltd. pp. 95–120. ISBN 0-7524-1707-X.
