= Penwith District Council elections =

Local government elections in Cornwall, England

Penwith was a non-metropolitan district in Cornwall, England. It was abolished on 1 April 2009 and replaced by Cornwall Council.

== Political control ==
The first election to the council was held in 1973, initially operating as a shadow authority before coming into its powers on 1 April 1974. Political control of the council from 1973 until the council's abolition in 2009 was held by the following parties:

Party in control	Years
Independent	1973–1986
No overall control	1986–2009

== Council elections ==
- 1973 Penwith District Council election
- 1976 Penwith District Council election
- 1979 Penwith District Council election (New ward boundaries)
- 1980 Penwith District Council election
- 1982 Penwith District Council election
- 1983 Penwith District Council election
- 1984 Penwith District Council election
- 1986 Penwith District Council election
- 1987 Penwith District Council election
- 1988 Penwith District Council election
- 1990 Penwith District Council election
- 1991 Penwith District Council election
- 1992 Penwith District Council election
- 1994 Penwith District Council election
- 1995 Penwith District Council election
- 1996 Penwith District Council election
- 1998 Penwith District Council election
- 1999 Penwith District Council election
- 2000 Penwith District Council election
- 2002 Penwith District Council election
- 2003 Penwith District Council election
- 2004 Penwith District Council election (New ward boundaries)
- 2006 Penwith District Council election
- 2007 Penwith District Council election

== Results maps ==
2004 results map

2006 results map

2007 results map

== By-election results ==
St Just By-Election 20 March 1997
Party	Candidate	Votes	%	±%
Labour		655	40.4	
Liberal Democrats		426	26.4	
Conservative		425	26.2	
Independent		117	7.2	
Majority		229	14.0	
Turnout		1,623		
Labour hold		Swing		

St Ives South By-Election 5 February 1998
Party	Candidate	Votes	%	±%
Conservative		275	39.9	
Liberal Democrats		267	38.7	
Labour		148	21.4	
Majority		8	1.2	
Turnout		690	24.8	
Conservative gain from Independent		Swing		

St Ives North By-Election 17 June 1999
Party	Candidate	Votes	%	±%
Liberal Democrats		442	39.0	−11.4
Independent		318	28.1	+28.1
Labour		223	19.7	−29.9
Conservative		149	13.2	+13.2
Majority		124	10.9	
Turnout		1,132		
Liberal Democrats hold		Swing		

Lelant and Carbis Bay By-Election 22 February 2001
Party	Candidate	Votes	%	±%
Conservative		650	70.8	+24.7
Liberal Democrats		268	29.2	−7.1
Majority		382	41.6	
Turnout		918	27.8	
Conservative hold		Swing		

Hayle Gwinear By-Election 26 April 2001
Party	Candidate	Votes	%	±%
Liberal Democrats		687	50.1	+18.8
Conservative		426	31.1	+31.1
Labour		258	18.8	+18.8
Majority		261	19.0	
Turnout		1,371	28.7	
Liberal Democrats hold		Swing		

St Buryan By-Election 7 June 2001
Party	Candidate	Votes	%	±%
Conservative	Eric Care	1,245	67.3	+5.2
Independent	Joby Jackson	606	32.7	+32.7
Majority		639	34.6	
Turnout		1,851		
Conservative hold		Swing		

Penzance West By-Election 15 November 2001
Party	Candidate	Votes	%	±%
Conservative	Robert Stokes	351	37.1	+6.5
Liberal Democrats	Simon Reed	330	34.9	+34.9
Labour	Timothy Pullen	191	20.2	−1.9
Independent	Malcolm Lawrence	53	5.6	−19.8
Independent	Joby Akira	20	2.1	−10.2
Majority		21	2.2	
Turnout		945	34.8	
Conservative hold		Swing		

St Buryan By-Election 14 November 2002
Party	Candidate	Votes	%	±%
Conservative		685	56.7	
Independent		264	21.8	
Labour		125	10.3	
Independent		119	9.8	
Independent		16	1.3	
Majority		421	34.9	
Turnout		1,209	46.2	
Conservative hold		Swing		

Penzance Central By-Election 2 October 2003
Party	Candidate	Votes	%	±%
Liberal Democrats	Jan Ruhrmund	454	39.4	
Conservative	Samuel Ryan	451	39.2	
Labour	Timothy Pullen	150	13.0	
Independent	Malcolm Lawrence	90	7.8	
Independent	Joby Akira	6	0.5	
Majority		3	0.2	
Turnout		1,151	42.1	
Liberal Democrats hold		Swing		

Hayle South By-Election 10 November 2005
Party	Candidate	Votes	%	±%
Independent	John Bennett	374	67.4	+14.3
Labour	Jayne Ninnes	181	32.6	+19.3
Majority		193	34.8	
Turnout		555	19.7	
Independent hold		Swing		

Penzance Central By-Election 17 November 2005
Party	Candidate	Votes	%	±%
Conservative	Derek Thomas	223	29.5	−6.5
Liberal Democrats	Mark Squire	208	27.5	−18.7
Labour	Cornelius Olivier	195	25.8	+8.0
Mebyon Kernow	Phillip Rendle	92	12.1	+12.1
Independent	Stephen Dicker	38	5.0	+5.0
Majority		15	2.0	
Turnout		756	26.2	
Conservative gain from Liberal Democrats		Swing		

Gwinear, Gwithian and Hayle East By-Election 25 October 2007
Party	Candidate	Votes	%	±%
Conservative	Ray Tovey	493	57.7	+4.6
Independent	Derek Elliott	192	22.5	+22.5
Labour	Jayne Ninnes	170	19.9	+19.9
Majority		301	35.2	
Turnout		855	27.1	
Conservative hold		Swing		
