= 1973 Penwith District Council election =

1973 UK local government election

| 12 April 1973 | 1976 → |

All 40 seats of Penwith District Council 21 seats needed for a majority
| | First party | Second party | Third party |
|---|---|---|---|
| Party | Independent | Labour | Liberal |
| Seats before | N/A | N/A | N/A |
| Seats won | 37 | 1 | 1 |
| Seats after | 37 | 1 | 1 |
| Popular vote | 42,275 | 1,348 | 1,176 |
| Percentage | 93.6% | 3.0% | 2.6% |
| | Fourth party |
| Party | RA |
| Seats before | N/A |
| Seats won | 1 |
| Seats after | 1 |
| Popular vote | 351 |
| Percentage | 0.8% |
Council control before election
N/A
Council control after election
Independent

Elections to Penwith District Council were held for the first time in 1973. All 40 seats were contested. Independent candidates won an overwhelming majority, gaining 37 seats. The Labour Party, the Liberal Party, and a Residents' Association candidate each won one seat.

== Results summary ==
Penwith District Council election, 1973
| Party | Seats | Gains | Losses | Net gain/loss | Seats % | Votes % | Votes | +/− |
|---|---|---|---|---|---|---|---|---|
| Independent | 37 | 37 | 0 | N/A | 92.5 | 93.6 | 42,275 | N/A |
| Labour | 1 | 1 | 0 | N/A | 2.5 | 3.0 | 1,348 | N/A |
| Liberal | 1 | 1 | 0 | N/A | 2.5 | 2.6 | 1,176 | N/A |
| Residents' association | 1 | 1 | 0 | N/A | 2.5 | 0.8 | 351 | N/A |

== Ward results ==
=== Hayle ===
Hayle
| Party | Candidate | Votes | % |
|---|---|---|---|
| Independent | W. Cock | 1,244 | 17.9 |
| Independent | J. Sleeman | 787 | 11.3 |
| Independent | T. Laity | 772 | 11.1 |
| Independent | F. Harwood | 763 | 11.0 |
| Independent | H. Johns | 717 | 10.3 |
| Independent | F. Ponting | 452 | 6.5 |
| Independent | R. Peller | 432 | 6.2 |
| Independent | E. Kewell | 392 | 5.6 |
| Independent | W. Garnish | 383 | 5.5 |
| Independent | S. Stock | 339 | 4.9 |
| Independent | L. Capper | 299 | 4.3 |
| Independent | S. Goff | 204 | 2.9 |
| Independent | J. Evans | 156 | 2.2 |
| Total ballots | | 6940 | |
| Turnout | | | 42.2 |
| Independent win (new seat) | | | |
| Independent win (new seat) | | | |
| Independent win (new seat) | | | |
| Independent win (new seat) | | | |
| Independent win (new seat) | | | |
| Independent win (new seat) | | | |

=== Lelant and Carbis Bay ===
Lelant and Carbis Bay
| Party | Candidate | Votes | % |
|---|---|---|---|
| Independent | A. Hosking | 491 | 29.0 |
| RA | J. Macdonald Clarke | 351 | 20.7 |
| Independent | K. Slocombe | 304 | 17.9 |
| Independent | S. Stoneman | 238 | 14.0 |
| Independent | A. Hill | 179 | 10.6 |
| Independent | A. Olds | 131 | 7.7 |
| Total ballots | | 1694 | |
| Turnout | | | 51.0 |
| Independent win (new seat) | | | |
| RA win (new seat) | | | |

=== Ludgvan ===
Ludgvan
| Party | Candidate | Votes | % |
|---|---|---|---|
| Independent | H. Lutey | 722 | 21.4 |
| Independent | H. Monk | 710 | 21.0 |
| Independent | R. Hall | 641 | 19.0 |
| Independent | J. Trevenen | 556 | 16.5 |
| Independent | W. Bolitho | 294 | 8.7 |
| Independent | R. Burns | 249 | 7.4 |
| Independent | H. Wills | 207 | 6.1 |
| Total ballots | | 3379 | |
| Turnout | | | 54.7 |
| Independent win (new seat) | | | |
| Independent win (new seat) | | | |
| Independent win (new seat) | | | |

=== Marazion ===
Marazion
| Party | Candidate | Votes | % |
|---|---|---|---|
| Independent | P. Badcock | 669 | 16.0 |
| Independent | C. Bryant | 562 | 13.5 |
| Independent | S. Gibson | 543 | 13.0 |
| Independent | E. Laity | 531 | 12.7 |
| Independent | R. Taylor | 505 | 12.1 |
| Independent | W. Miners | 397 | 9.5 |
| Independent | T. Bryant | 364 | 8.7 |
| Independent | F. James | 254 | 6.1 |
| Independent | L. Lanigan | 174 | 4.2 |
| Independent | A. Seagrove | 171 | 4.1 |
| Total ballots | | 4170 | |
| Turnout | | | 55.8 |
| Independent win (new seat) | | | |
| Independent win (new seat) | | | |
| Independent win (new seat) | | | |

=== Penzance Central ===
Penzance Central
| Party | Candidate | Votes | % |
|---|---|---|---|
| Independent | J. Laity | 1,075 | 20.4 |
| Independent | J. Batten | 1,025 | 19.5 |
| Independent | F. Peak | 959 | 18.2 |
| Independent | R. Allbright | 845 | 16.0 |
| Independent | H. Martin | 700 | 13.3 |
| Independent | J. Mann | 661 | 12.6 |
| Total ballots | | 5265 | |
| Turnout | | | 38.1 |
| Independent win (new seat) | | | |
| Independent win (new seat) | | | |
| Independent win (new seat) | | | |
| Independent win (new seat) | | | |
| Independent win (new seat) | | | |

=== Penzance East ===
Penzance East
| Party | Candidate | Votes | % |
|---|---|---|---|
| Independent | R. Berryman | 851 | 20.4 |
| Independent | D. Pooley | 731 | 17.5 |
| Independent | J. Owner | 719 | 17.2 |
| Independent | H. Richardson | 567 | 13.6 |
| Independent | C. Harvey | 479 | 11.5 |
| Labour | E. Eddy | 435 | 10.4 |
| Independent | C. Hope-Smith | 393 | 9.4 |
| Total ballots | | 4175 | |
| Turnout | | | 40.9 |
| Independent win (new seat) | | | |
| Independent win (new seat) | | | |
| Independent win (new seat) | | | |
| Independent win (new seat) | | | |

=== Penzance North ===
Penzance North
| Party | Candidate | Votes | % |
|---|---|---|---|
| Independent | J. Richards | 754 | 36.1 |
| Independent | C. Symons | 479 | 22.9 |
| Independent | R. Dibb | 420 | 20.1 |
| Independent | R. Burstow | 307 | 14.7 |
| Independent | W. Macdonald Murray | 130 | 6.2 |
| Total ballots | | 2090 | |
| Turnout | | | 50.4 |
| Independent win (new seat) | | | |
| Independent win (new seat) | | | |

=== Penzance South ===
Penzance South
| Party | Candidate | Votes | % |
|---|---|---|---|
| Independent | G. Cocks | 818 | 22.7 |
| Independent | M. Beckerleg | 729 | 20.3 |
| Independent | C. Ash | 656 | 18.2 |
| Independent | E. Palmer | 539 | 15.0 |
| Independent | L. Spargo | 523 | 14.5 |
| Independent | H. Matthews | 333 | 9.3 |
| Total ballots | | 3598 | |
| Turnout | | | 47.7 |
| Independent win (new seat) | | | |
| Independent win (new seat) | | | |
| Independent win (new seat) | | | |
| Independent win (new seat) | | | |

=== St Buryan ===
St Buryan
| Party | Candidate | Votes | % |
|---|---|---|---|
| Independent | D. Trewern | 822 | 30.6 |
| Independent | T. Hicks | 722 | 26.9 |
| Independent | J. Daniel | 630 | 23.5 |
| Independent | L. Oates | 238 | 8.9 |
| Independent | R. Nicholls | 151 | 5.6 |
| Independent | A. Whent | 123 | 4.6 |
| Total ballots | | 2686 | |
| Turnout | | | 68.5 |
| Independent win (new seat) | | | |
| Independent win (new seat) | | | |

=== St Ives ===
St Ives
| Party | Candidate | Votes | % |
|---|---|---|---|
| Liberal | G. Tonkin | 1,176 | 14.3 |
| Independent | M. Peters | 1,022 | 12.5 |
| Independent | H. Franklin | 978 | 11.9 |
| Labour | T. Harvey | 913 | 11.1 |
| Independent | J. Thomas | 894 | 10.9 |
| Independent | D. Jones | 880 | 10.7 |
| Independent | T. Trevorrow | 859 | 10.5 |
| Independent | O. Eddy | 697 | 8.5 |
| Independent | E. Noall | 660 | 8.0 |
| Independent | W. Rawson | 124 | 1.5 |
| Total ballots | | 8203 | |
| Turnout | | | 50.0 |
| Liberal win (new seat) | | | |
| Independent win (new seat) | | | |
| Independent win (new seat) | | | |
| Labour win (new seat) | | | |
| Independent win (new seat) | | | |
| Independent win (new seat) | | | |

=== St Just ===
St Just
| Party | Candidate | Votes | % |
|---|---|---|---|
| Independent | M. Derrington | 959 | 32.5 |
| Independent | D. Woolcock | 688 | 23.3 |
| Independent | T. McFadden | 668 | 22.6 |
| Independent | R. Rowe | 370 | 12.5 |
| Independent | S. Hancock | 265 | 9.0 |
| Total ballots | | 2950 | |
| Turnout | | | 56.0 |
| Independent win (new seat) | | | |
| Independent win (new seat) | | | |
| Independent win (new seat) | | | |

== See also ==
- Penwith District Council elections
