= 2004 Penwith District Council election =

2004 UK local government election

Results of the 2004 Penwith District Council election

Elections to Penwith District Council were held on 10 June 2004. The whole council was up for election with boundary changes since the last election in 2003 increasing the number of seats by one. The council stayed under no overall control and overall turnout was 46.9%

After the election, the composition of the council was:

- Liberal Democrat 14
- Conservative 12
- Independent 8
- Labour 1

== Results ==
Penwith local election result 2004
Party	Seats	Gains	Losses	Net gain/loss	Seats %	Votes %	Votes	+/−
Liberal Democrats	14			+3	40.0	30.4	11,870	+12.1
Conservative	12			+2	34.3	28.0	10,942	-13.0
Independent	8				22.9	22.9	8,936	-8.5
Labour	1			-1	2.9	12.1	4,718	+6.3
UKIP	0			0	0.0	4.7	1,835	+3.0
Mebyon Kernow	0				0.0	1.9	756	+0.2

=== By ward ===
Goldsithney
Party	Candidate	Votes	%	±%
Liberal Democrats	Patricia Sanderson	365	51.7	
Conservative	Sidney Thomas	341	48.3	
Majority		24	3.4	
Turnout		706	49.0	

Gulval & Heamoor (2)
Party	Candidate	Votes	%	±%
Liberal Democrats	Maria Fonk	759		
Liberal Democrats	Jack Dixon	580		
Independent	Stephen Freeman	423		
Conservative	Peter Powell	243		
Labour	Franklyn Bennetts	151		
Turnout		2,156	46.7	

Gwinear, Gwithian & Hayle East (2)
Party	Candidate	Votes	%	±%
Conservative	Sarah Roskilly	808		
Liberal Democrats	Robert Lello	584		
UKIP	Jeffrey Mager	408		
Labour	Adrian Marsham	219		
Turnout		2,019	44.2	

Hayle North (2)
Party	Candidate	Votes	%	±%
Liberal Democrats	Terry Lello	756		
Independent	Owen Philp	400		
Independent	Edgar Philp	368		
Labour	Frederick Bultitude	283		
Turnout		1,807	40.8	

Hayle South (2)
Party	Candidate	Votes	%	±%
Independent	Shirley Oliver	736		
Liberal Democrats	Duncan Cook	465		
Labour	Frederick Statham	184		
Turnout		1,385	37.5	

Lelant & Carbis Bay (2)
Party	Candidate	Votes	%	±%
Conservative	Elizabeth Penhaligon	732		
Conservative	Yvonne Watson	717		
Liberal Democrats	Richard Birch	430		
Labour	Terence Murray	325		
UKIP	Bryan Bracegirdle	207		
Turnout		2,411	48.2	

Ludgvan & Towednack (2)
Party	Candidate	Votes	%	±%
Independent	Alice Bailey	1,021		
Conservative	Henry Smith	691		
Independent	Mark Squire	601		
Turnout		2,313	51.2	

Madron & Zennor
Party	Candidate	Votes	%	±%
Independent	Roy Mann	480	79.1	
Labour	Stella Redgrave	127	20.9	
Majority		353	58.2	
Turnout		607	47.2	

Marazion & Perranuthnoe
Party	Candidate	Votes	%	±%
Conservative	Neil Badcock	560	67.6	
Independent	Malcolm Lawrence	166	20.0	
Labour	Nicholas Round	103	12.4	
Majority		394	47.6	
Turnout		829	58.3	

Morvah, Pendenn & St Just (3)
Party	Candidate	Votes	%	±%
Independent	Christopher Goninan	796		
Liberal Democrats	Patricia Angove	670		
Liberal Democrats	James Thomas	625		
Conservative	Richard Eddy	555		
Independent	Benjamin Angwin	469		
Conservative	William McFadden	450		
Independent	Gerald Nicholls	428		
UKIP	Rose Smith	264		
Labour	Brian Simm	223		
Turnout		4,480	49.9	

Penzance Central (2)
Party	Candidate	Votes	%	±%
Liberal Democrats	Simon Reed	684		
Conservative	Sam Ryan	534		
Liberal Democrats	Ian Fraser	508		
Labour	Timothy Pullen	264		
Turnout		1,990	45.9	

Penzance East (3)
Party	Candidate	Votes	%	±%
Liberal Democrats	Caroline White	762		
Independent	William Aitken	638		
Liberal Democrats	Peter Mates	618		
Liberal Democrats	Richard Clark	574		
UKIP	Robert Smith	384		
Independent	Carol Dennis	383		
Labour	Cornelius Olivier	356		
Labour	Robin Gregory	349		
Turnout		4,064	39.6	

Penzance Promenade (2)
Party	Candidate	Votes	%	±%
Liberal Democrats	Ian Ruhrmund	659		
Conservative	Emma Schofield	481		
Liberal Democrats	Valerie Barnes	374		
Conservative	Michael Waters	300		
Mebyon Kernow	Phillip Rendle	231		
UKIP	John Wing	172		
Labour	Sara Olivier	143		
Turnout		2,360	53.7	

Penzance South (3)
Party	Candidate	Votes	%	±%
Labour	Michael Payne	1,223		
Conservative	Roger Harding	1,154		
Conservative	Malcolm Pilcher	852		
Mebyon Kernow	Frank Granger	525		
Liberal Democrats	Dennis Axford	404		
UKIP	Michael Faulkner	400		
Turnout		4,558	56.0	

St Buryan (2)
Party	Candidate	Votes	%	±%
Conservative	Adrian Semmens	832		
Conservative	William Maddern	626		
Independent	Ruth Lewarne	493		
Labour	Ann Round	330		
Turnout		2,281	52.4	

St Erth & St Hilary
Party	Candidate	Votes	%	±%
Independent	Peter Badcock	508	69.0	
Liberal Democrats	Michael Hanley	228	31.0	
Majority		280	38.0	
Turnout		736	45.2	

St Ives North (2)
Party	Candidate	Votes	%	±%
Liberal Democrats	Andrew Mitchell	854		
Liberal Democrats	George Tonkin	617		
Conservative	Godfrey Penhaligon	300		
Labour	Ian Hope	241		
Turnout		2,012	42.0	

St Ives South (2)
Party	Candidate	Votes	%	±%
Independent	Joan Tanner	613		
Conservative	Joan Symons	478		
Independent	Norman Laity	413		
Liberal Democrats	Bill Fry	354		
Conservative	Colin Sanger	288		
Labour	Graham Webster	197		
Turnout		2,343	44.6	
