= 1976 Penwith District Council election =

1976 UK local government election

| ← 1973 | 6 May 1976 | 1979 → |

All 40 seats of Penwith District Council 21 seats needed for a majority
| | First party | Second party | Third party |
|---|---|---|---|
| Party | Independent | Labour | Liberal |
| Seats before | 37 | 1 | 1 |
| Seats won | 38 | 1 | 1 |
| Seat change | ▲1 | Steady | Steady |
Council control before election
Independent
Council control after election
Independent

Elections for all 40 seats on Penwith District Council were held on 6 May 1976, the same day as other local elections in the United Kingdom. The composition of the council remained largely unchanged: independent candidates won 38 seats, an increase of one, and Labour and the Liberal Party each won one seat unopposed in St Ives.

== Results ==
Penwith local election result 1976
| Party | Seats | Gains | Losses | Net gain/loss | Seats % | Votes % | Votes | +/− |
|---|---|---|---|---|---|---|---|---|
| Independent | 38 | 1 | 0 | ▲1 | 95.0 | | | |
| Liberal | 1 | 0 | 0 | Steady | 2.5 | | | |
| Labour | 1 | 0 | 0 | Steady | 2.5 | | | |

== Ward results ==
=== Hayle (6 seats) ===
Hayle
| Party | Candidate | Votes | % |
|---|---|---|---|
| Independent | C. Cock (Note: This person was an incumbent councillor) | 1,015 | 15.89 |
| Independent | J. Sleeman | 960 | 15.03 |
| Independent | T. Laity | 892 | 13.96 |
| Independent | F. Johns | 740 | 11.58 |
| Independent | Frederick Harwood | 679 | 10.63 |
| Independent | E. Coombe | 665 | 10.41 |
| Independent | F. Dunn | 577 | 9.03 |
| Independent | S. Stock | 470 | 7.36 |
| Independent | Frederick Ponting | 390 | 6.11 |
| Total votes | | 6,388 | |
| Turnout | | | 45.7 |
| Registered electors | | 5,978 | |
| Independent hold | | | |
| Independent hold | | | |
| Independent hold | | | |
| Independent hold | | | |
| Independent hold | | | |
| Independent gain from Independent | | | |

=== Lelant and Carbis Bay (2 seats) ===
Lelant and Carbis Bay
| Party | Candidate | Votes | % | ±% |
|---|---|---|---|---|
| Independent | R. Elsden | Unopposed | | |
| Independent | J. Clarke Macdonald | Unopposed | | |
| Independent gain from Independent | | | | |
| Independent gain from Residents | | | | |

=== Ludgvan (3 seats) ===
Ludgvan
| Party | Candidate | Votes | % |
|---|---|---|---|
| Independent | H. Lutey | 904 | 25.37 |
| Independent | A. Bailey | 773 | 21.70 |
| Independent | A. Penhaul | 673 | 18.89 |
| Independent | R. Hall | 640 | 17.96 |
| Independent | J. Trevenen | 573 | 16.08 |
| Total votes | | 3,563 | |
| Turnout | | | 51.4 |
| Registered electors | | 3,411 | |
| Independent hold | | | |
| Independent gain from Independent | | | |
| Independent gain from Independent | | | |

=== Marazion (3 seats) ===
Marazion
| Party | Candidate | Votes | % |
|---|---|---|---|
| Independent | P. Badcock | 980 | 27.37 |
| Independent | C. Bryant | 924 | 25.81 |
| Independent | S. Gibson | 731 | 20.42 |
| Independent | J. Brooke | 703 | 19.64 |
| Independent | D. Taylor | 242 | 6.76 |
| Total votes | | 3,580 | |
| Turnout | | | 49.0 |
| Registered electors | | 3,486 | |
| Independent hold | | | |
| Independent gain from Independent | | | |
| Independent gain from Independent | | | |

=== Penzance Central (5 seats) ===
Penzance Central
| Party | Candidate | Votes | % |
|---|---|---|---|
| Independent | J. Laity | 1,202 | 23.08 |
| Independent | J. Peak | 1,074 | 20.62 |
| Independent | R. Allbright | 978 | 18.78 |
| Independent | J. Batten | 802 | 15.40 |
| Independent | Joan Batten | 607 | 11.66 |
| Independent | A. Burstow | 482 | 9.25 |
| Independent | C. Darquies | 63 | 1.21 |
| Total votes | | 5,208 | |
| Turnout | | | 35.4 |
| Registered electors | | 4,948 | |
| Independent hold | | | |
| Independent hold | | | |
| Independent hold | | | |
| Independent hold | | | |
| Independent gain from Independent | | | |

== See also ==
- 1973 Penwith District Council election
- 1979 Penwith District Council election
