= 1979 Penwith District Council election =

1979 UK local government election

Elections to Penwith District Council were held for all 33 new seats in 1979, after ward changes the year before.

After the election, the composition of the council was: 28 Independents, 4 Conservatives and 1 Labour. The Liberals and Mebyon Kernow did not win any seats.

== Election result ==
Penwith local election result 1979
Party	Seats	Gains	Losses	Net gain/loss	Seats %	Votes %	Votes	+/−
Independent	28			▼9	82.4	73.56	28,562	
Conservative	4			▲4	11.8	12.49	4,851	
Labour	1			Steady	2.9	6.36	2,469	
Mebyon Kernow	0			Steady	0.0	4.58	1,777	
Independent Liberal	0			Steady	0.0	1.84	715	
People's Representatives	0			Steady	0.0	1.17	455	
Liberal	0			▼1	0.0	0.00	0	

== Ward results ==
=== Hayle Gwinear (2 seats) ===
Hayle (Gwinear)
Party	Candidate	Votes	%	±%
Independent	T. Laity	810	27.08	
Independent	E. Philip	707	23.64	
Independent	M. Reynolds	498	16.65	
Mebyon Kernow	G. Ansell	417	13.94	
Independent	R. Leeming	382	12.77	
Independent	J. Evans	177	5.92	
Turnout			73.6	

=== Hayle Gwithian (3 seats) ===
Hayle (Gwithian)
Party	Candidate	Votes	%	±%
Independent	W. Cock	1,270	25.51	
Conservative	J. Sleeman	1,254	25.19	
Conservative	D. Bray	857	17.21	
Labour	J. Ring	559	11.23	
Independent	F. Ponting	559	11.23	
Independent	P. Smith	480	9.64	
Turnout			74.1	

=== Lelant & Carbis Bay (2 seats) ===
Lelant & Carbis Bay
Party	Candidate	Votes	%	±%
Independent	J. Clarke Macdonald	994	40.21	
Conservative	R. Elsden	980	39.64	
Independent	R. Goodwin	498	20.15	
Turnout			70.2	

=== Ludgvan (3 seats) ===
Ludgvan
Party	Candidate	Votes	%	±%
Independent	H. Lutey	1,395	26.03	
Independent	A. Bailey	1,384	25.82	
Independent	J. Vincent	1072	20.00	
Conservative	R. Davis	780	14.55	
Independent	J. Trevenen	729	13.60	
Turnout			75.8	

=== Marazion (1 seat) ===
Marazion
Party	Candidate	Votes	%	±%
Independent	P. Stevens	396	45.00	
Independent	J. Brooke	202	22.95	
Independent	S. Gibson	189	21.48	
Independent Liberal	D. Grayson	93	10.57	
Turnout			74.4	

=== Penzance Central (2 seats) ===
Penzance Central
Party	Candidate	Votes	%	±%
Independent	J. Batten	1,358	41.16	
Independent	R. Allbright	1,274	38.62	
Labour	R. Goodwin	667	20.22	
Turnout			77.2	

=== Penzance East (3 seats) ===
Penzance East
Party	Candidate	Votes	%	±%
Independent	A. Richards	Unopposed		
Independent	J. Nicholas	Unopposed		
Independent	R. Berryman	Unopposed		

=== Penzance North (2 seats) ===
Penzance North
Party	Candidate	Votes	%	±%
Independent	C. Watts	Unopposed		
Independent	J. Richards	Unopposed		

=== Penzance South (3 seats) ===
Penzance South
Party	Candidate	Votes	%	±%
Independent	G. Cocks	1,418	27.7	
Independent	C. Ash	1,018	19.9	
Independent	L. Spargo	988	19.3	
Independent	J. Ruhrmund	909	17.7	
Independent	J. Fowler	795	15.5	
Turnout			74.7	

=== Penzance West (2 seats) ===
Penzance West
Party	Candidate	Votes	%	±%
Independent	D. Pooley	1,158	34.3	
Independent	J. Laity	1,109	32.9	
Independent	F. Peak	1,106	32.8	
Turnout			74.0	

=== Perranuthnoe (1 seat) ===
Perranuthnoe
Party	Candidate	Votes	%	±%
Independent	C. Bryant	Unopposed		

=== St Buryan (2 seats) ===
St Buryan
Party	Candidate	Votes	%	±%
Independent	T. Hicks	Unopposed		
Independent	J. Daniel	Unopposed		

=== St Erth and St Hilary (1 seat) ===
St Erth and St Hilary
Party	Candidate	Votes	%	±%
Independent	P. Badcock	Unopposed		

=== St Ives North (2 seats) ===
St Ives North
Party	Candidate	Votes	%	±%
Labour	T. Harvey	1,243	37.6	
Independent	M. Peters	689	20.9	
Independent Liberal	G. Tonkin	622	18.8	
People's Representative	J. Wilkes	455	13.8	
Mebyon Kernow	M. Ricketts	293	8.9	
Turnout			74.2	

=== St Ives South (2 seats) ===
St Ives South
Party	Candidate	Votes	%	±%
Independent	O. Eddy	1,133	42.7	
Conservative	H. Storer	980	36.9	
Mebyon Kernow	P. Prior	540	20.4	
Turnout			69.6	

=== St Just (3 seats) ===
St Just
Party	Candidate	Votes	%	±%
Independent	R. Rowe	1,130	25.7	
Independent	D. Jasper	1,045	23.8	
Independent	T. McFadden	969	22.1	
Independent	E. Dymond	721	16.4	
Mebyon Kernow	M. Williams	527	12.0	
Turnout			75.3	

== See also ==
- 1976 Penwith District Council election
