= 2003 Penwith District Council election =

2003 UK local government election

Elections to Penwith District Council were held on 1 May 2003. One third of the council was up for election and the council stayed under no overall control. Overall turnout was 37.6%.

After the election, the composition of the council was:

- Liberal Democrat 11
- Conservative 10
- Independent 8
- Others 3
- Labour 2

== Results ==
Penwith local election result 2003
Party	Seats	Gains	Losses	Net gain/loss	Seats %	Votes %	Votes	+/−
Conservative	5			0	41.7	41.0	5,529	+17.1
Independent	4			0	33.3	31.4	4,232	+2.8
Liberal Democrats	3			+2	25.0	18.3	2,472	-18.9
Labour	0			-1	0.0	5.8	787	-1.6
Mebyon Kernow	0				0.0	1.7	230	-0.4
UKIP	0				0.0	1.7	227	+1.0

1 Conservative candidate was unopposed.

=== By ward ===
Hayle-Gwinear
Party	Candidate	Votes	%	±%
Independent	Shirley Oliver	829	60.7	
Conservative	Sarah Roskilly	536	39.3	
Majority		293	21.4	
Turnout		1,365	35.0	

Hayle-Gwithian
Party	Candidate	Votes	%	±%
Independent	Owen Philp	971	61.4	+14.5
Conservative	Clinton Thomas	611	38.6	+38.6
Majority		360	22.8	
Turnout		1,582	32.8	−4.2

Lelant and Carbis Bay
Party	Candidate	Votes	%	±%
Conservative	Yvonne Watson	756	56.3	−7.3
Liberal Democrats	Susan Holland	467	34.8	+14.9
UKIP	Bryan Bracegirdle	119	8.9	+8.9
Majority		289	21.5	−22.2
Turnout		1,342	39.7	−1.3

Ludgvan
Party	Candidate	Votes	%	±%
Conservative	Henry Smith	966	57.4	+57.4
Independent	Mark Squire	716	42.6	−42.8
Majority		250	14.8	
Turnout		1,682	39.8	+0.1

Marazion
Party	Candidate	Votes	%	±%
Conservative	Neil Badcock	472	72.8	
Liberal Democrats	Nigel Walker	176	27.2	
Majority		296	45.6	
Turnout		648	54.5	

Penzance East
Party	Candidate	Votes	%	±%
Liberal Democrats	Peter Mates	489	35.5	−11.3
Labour	Cornelius Olivier	366	26.6	+3.6
Conservative	James Champion	275	20.0	+5.4
Independent	Carol Dennis	125	9.1	−0.1
UKIP	Michael Faulkner	108	7.8	+4.2
Independent	Joby Akira	15	1.1	−1.8
Majority		123	8.9	−14.9
Turnout		1,378	34.2	−3.8

Penzance South
Party	Candidate	Votes	%	±%
Conservative	Roger Harding	1,090	72.1	
Labour	Sara Olivier	421	27.9	
Majority		669	44.2	
Turnout		1,511	43.2	

St Buryan
Party	Candidate	Votes	%	±%
Conservative	Eric Care	unopposed		

St Erth and St Hilary
Party	Candidate	Votes	%	±%
Independent	Peter Badcock	487	71.4	
Independent	Michael Hanley	195	28.6	
Majority		292	42.8	
Turnout		682	42.8	

St Ives North
Party	Candidate	Votes	%	±%
Liberal Democrats	George Tonkin	649	74.5	−8.3
Conservative	Margaret Milton	222	25.5	+8.3
Majority		427	49.0	−16.6
Turnout		871	30.1	−5.7

St Ives South
Party	Candidate	Votes	%	±%
Independent	Joan Tanner	482	48.6	
Liberal Democrats	William Fry	225	22.7	
Conservative	Derek Milton	211	21.3	
Independent	William Trevorrow	73	7.4	
Majority		257	25.9	
Turnout		991	37.4	

St Just
Party	Candidate	Votes	%	±%
Liberal Democrats	Patricia Angove	466	32.7	+32.7
Conservative	William Penaluna	390	27.4	−15.4
Independent	Benjamin Angwin	339	23.8	+9.6
Mebyon Kernow	Andrew Moyle	230	16.1	−0.4
Majority		76	5.3	
Turnout		1,425	39.1	−4.8
