= Lanivet, Blisland and Bodmin St Lawrence (electoral division) =

Electoral division of Cornwall in the UK

- ward Cornwall Council
- Boundary of Lanivet, Blisland and Bodmin St Lawrence in Cornwall from 2021.
- County: Cornwall

Current ward
- Created: 2021
- Councillor: Jennifer Cruse (Conservative)
- Number of councillors: One
- Created from: Lanivet and Blisland

Lanivet, Blisland and Bodmin St Lawrence is an electoral division of Cornwall in the United Kingdom which returns one member to sit on Cornwall Council. It was created at the 2021 local elections, being created from the former division of Lanivet and Blisland. The current councillor is Jennifer Cruse, a member of the Conservative Party.

== Boundaries ==
Lanivet, Blisland and Bodmin St Lawrence represents the entirety of the parishes of Blisland, Cardinham, Helland, Lanhydrock, Lanivet, Withiel, and the western portion of the parish of Bodmin.

The parish of Blisland includes the villages and hamlets of Blisland, Bradford, Merry Meeting, Pendrift, Temple, Tresarrett, and Waterloo.

The parish of Bodmin represented by the electoral division includes the hamlets of Dunmere, St Lawrence, which is shared with the parish of Lanivet, and the western portion of the town of Bodmin.

The parish of Cardinham includes the villages and hamlets of Bunny's Hill, Little Downs, Millpool, Milltown, Mount, Old Cardinham Castle, Welltown, and Fletchersbridge, which is shared with the electoral division of Bodmin St Petroc's.

The parish of Helland includes the village of Helland.

The parish of Lanhydrock includes the hamlets of Newton and Trebyan.

The parish of Lanivet includes the villages and hamlets of Bodwannick, Bokiddick, Lamorick, Lanivet, Nanstallon, Trebell Green, Tregullon, Tremore, St Lawrence, which is shared with the parish of Bodmin, and Ruthernbridge, which is shared with the parish of Withiel and the electoral division of Wadebridge West and St Mabyn.

The parish of Withiel includes the villages and hamlets of Retire, Ruthernbridge, Tregawne, Withiel, and Withielgoose.

== Councillors ==
Election	Member	Party
2021	Jennifer Cruse	Conservative

== Election results ==
=== 2021 election ===
c

2021 election: Lanivet, Blisland and Bodmin St Lawrence
Party	Candidate	Votes	%	±%
Conservative	Jennifer Cruse	846	41.8	N/A
Liberal Democrats	Chris Batters (Note: Incumbent councillor, formerly representing Lanivet and Blisland)	839	41.5	N/A
Green	Len Croney	178	8.8	N/A
Labour	Graham Mountcastle	160	7.9	N/A
Majority		7	0.3	N/A
Rejected ballots		23	1.1	N/A
Turnout		2,046		N/A
Conservative win (new seat)				
