= Lanivet and Blisland (electoral division) =

Former electoral division of Cornwall in the UK

- Former ward Cornwall Council
- Boundary of Lanivet and Blisland in Cornwall from 2013-2021.
- County: Cornwall

2013–2021
- Number of councillors: One
- Replaced by: Lanivet, Blisland and Bodmin St Lawrence
- Created from: Lanivet

Lanivet and Blisland (Cornish: Lenneves ha Blus) was an electoral division of Cornwall in the United Kingdom which returned one member to sit on Cornwall Council between 2013 and 2021. It was abolished at the 2021 local elections, being succeeded by Lanivet, Blisland and Bodmin St Lawrence.

== Councillors ==
Election	Member	Party
2013	Chris Batters	Liberal Democrat
2017	Chris Batters	Liberal Democrat
2021	Seat abolished	

== Extent ==
Lanivet and Blisland represented the villages of Withiel, Lanivet, Nanstallon, Helland, Blisland, Temple and Cardinham, and the hamlets of Retire, Withielgoose, Pendrift, Waterloo, Millpool, Bunny's Hill, Little Downs, Newton, Trebyan and Tregullon. The village of Ruthernbridge was shared with the St Issey and St Tudy division, the hamlet of St Lawrence was shared with the Bodmin St Mary's division, the hamlet of Fletchersbridge was shared with the Bodmin St Petroc division, and the village of Mount was shared with the St Cleer division. The division covered 13,162 hectares in total.

== Election results ==
=== 2017 election ===
2017 election: Lanivet and Blisland
Party	Candidate	Votes	%	±%
Liberal Democrats	Chris Batters	735	53.1	
Conservative	Rachel Beadle	485	35.0	
Independent	Andy Coppin	104	7.5	
UKIP	Oliver Challis	57	4.1	
Majority		250	18.1	
Rejected ballots		3	0.2	
Turnout		1384	43.6	
Liberal Democrats hold		Swing		

=== 2013 election ===
2013 election: Lanivet and Blisland
Party	Candidate	Votes	%	±%
Liberal Democrats	Chris Batters	532	46.7	
UKIP	Tom Hobbs	403	35.4	
Green	Steve Haynes	185	16.2	
Majority		129	11.3	
Rejected ballots		19	1.7	
Turnout		1139	34.7	
Liberal Democrats win (new seat)				
