= Bodmin St Petroc's (electoral division) =

Electoral division of Cornwall in the UK

- ward Cornwall Council
- Boundary of Bodmin St Petroc's in Cornwall from 2021.
- County: Cornwall

Current ward
- Created: 2021
- Councillor: Leigh Frost (Liberal Democrat)
- Number of councillors: One
- Created from: Bodmin St Petroc

Bodmin St Petroc's is an electoral division of Cornwall in the United Kingdom which returns one member to sit on Cornwall Council. It was created at the 2021 local elections, being preceded by the smaller Bodmin St Petroc division. The current councillor is Leigh Frost, a Liberal Democrat.

== Extent ==
Bodmin St Petroc's represents the centre and east of the town of Bodmin, the hamlet of Cooksland, and parts of the hamlet of Fletchersbridge (which is shared with the Lanivet, Blisland and Bodmin St Lawrence division).

== Election results ==
=== 2021 election ===
2021 election: Bodmin St Petroc's
Party	Candidate	Votes	%	±%
Liberal Democrats	Leigh Frost	759	50.3	
Conservative	Alex Butters	541	35.9	
Labour	John Gibbs	189	12.5	
Majority		218	14.5	
Rejected ballots		19	1.3	
Turnout		1508	30.5	
Registered electors		4939		
Liberal Democrats win (new seat)				
