= Courtenay of Tremere =

Arms of Courtenay: Or, three torteaux a label azure

The Courtenay family of Tremere (now Tremore in the parish of Lanivet, Cornwall) was a cadet line of the prominent Courtenay family seated at Powderham in Devon, itself a cadet line of the Courtenay Earls of Devon of Tiverton Castle, feudal barons of Plympton and feudal barons of Okehampton.

The Courtenay family of Tremere was descended from Edmond Courtenay of Deviock in Cornwall, 5th son of Sir Philip Courtenay (1404–1463) of Powderham, grandson of Sir Philip Courtenay (died 1406) of Powderham by his wife Elizabeth Hungerford, daughter of Walter Hungerford, 1st Baron Hungerford (d.1449), KG.

Sir Philip Courtenay (died 1406) of Powderham was a younger son of Hugh de Courtenay, 2nd/10th Earl of Devon (d.1377), and had been given the manor of Powderham by his mother Margaret de Bohun (d.1391), eldest surviving daughter of Humphrey de Bohun, 4th Earl of Hereford by his wife Princess Elizabeth, a daughter of King Edward I.

Edmond Courtenay of Deviock married Jane Deviock, a daughter and co-heiress of John Deviock of Deviock near St Germans in Cornwall.

== Notable family members ==
- Richard Courtenay of Lostwithiel in Cornwall, who was also seated at Tremeer.
- John Courtenay of Tremere was an MP.
