= Bodmin St Petroc (electoral division) =

Former electoral division of Cornwall in the UK

- Former ward Cornwall Council
- Boundary of Bodmin St Petroc in Cornwall from 2013-2021.
- County: Cornwall

2013–2021
- Number of councillors: One
- Replaced by: Bodmin St Petroc's
- Created from: Bodmin Central; Bodmin East
- Number of councillors: One

Bodmin St Petroc was an electoral division of Cornwall in the United Kingdom which returned one member to sit on Cornwall Council between 2013 and 2021. It was abolished at the 2021 local elections, being succeeded by the larger Bodmin St Petroc's.

== Extent ==
Bodmin St Petroc represented the east side of Bodmin, the hamlet of Cooksland, and parts of the hamlet of Fletchersbridge (which was shared with Lanivet and Blisland). The division covered 752 hectares in total.

== Election results ==
=== 2017 election ===
2017 election: Bodmin St Petroc (Note: Although originally scheduled to take place on the same day as other elections to Cornwall Council (4 May 2017), the death of incumbent and Liberal Democrat candidate Steve Rogerson on 16 April meant the election was countermanded to a later date. The election for a new councillor was held on 8 June.)
Party	Candidate	Votes	%	±%
Liberal Democrats	Leigh Frost	1,047	39.0	
Conservative	Sylvia Berry	914	34.1	
Labour	Marc Thorne	463	17.3	
Mebyon Kernow	John Gibbs	231	8.6	
Majority		133	5.0	
Rejected ballots		27	1.0	
Turnout		2682	67.3	
Liberal Democrats hold		Swing		

=== 2013 election ===
2013 election: Bodmin St Petroc
Party	Candidate	Votes	%	±%
Liberal Democrats	Steve Rogerson	649	55.3	
UKIP	John Masters	188	16.0	
Independent	Lance Kennedy	181	15.4	
Mebyon Kernow	John Gibbs	139	11.8	
Majority		461	39.3	
Rejected ballots		16	1.4	
Turnout		1173	30.0	
Liberal Democrats win (new seat)				
