= Triggshire =

Ancient administrative unit of Cornwall, England

Trigg Hundred
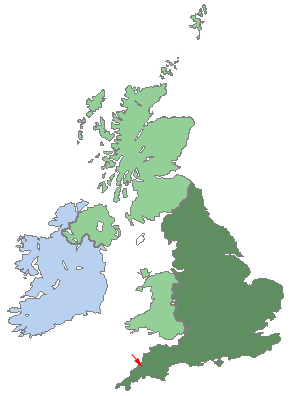
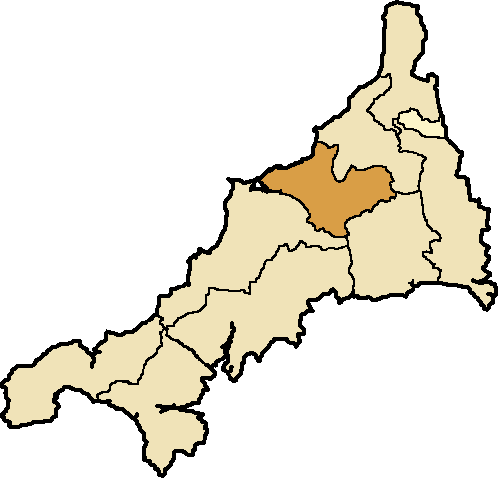
Shown within UK and Cornwall

The hundred of Trigg (also known as Triggshire) was one of ten ancient administrative shires of Cornwall—see "Hundreds of Cornwall".

Trigg is mentioned by name during the 7th century, as "Pagus Tricurius", "land of three war hosts". It was to the north of Cornwall, and included Bodmin Moor, Bodmin and the district to the west and north of the Moor. The high incidence of imported pottery from the period found at Tintagel Castle suggests that this was an area of high significance, where war bands from the region may have congregated.

The name may be cognate with that of Trégor (Bro-Dreger) in Brittany, now northwest France. The same name is used for the ecclesiastical deaneries of Trigg Major and Trigg Minor which between them cover a wider area (but not identical to the historical boundaries). Since 1874 they have been within the Archdeaconry of Bodmin, and since 1876 within the Diocese of Truro.

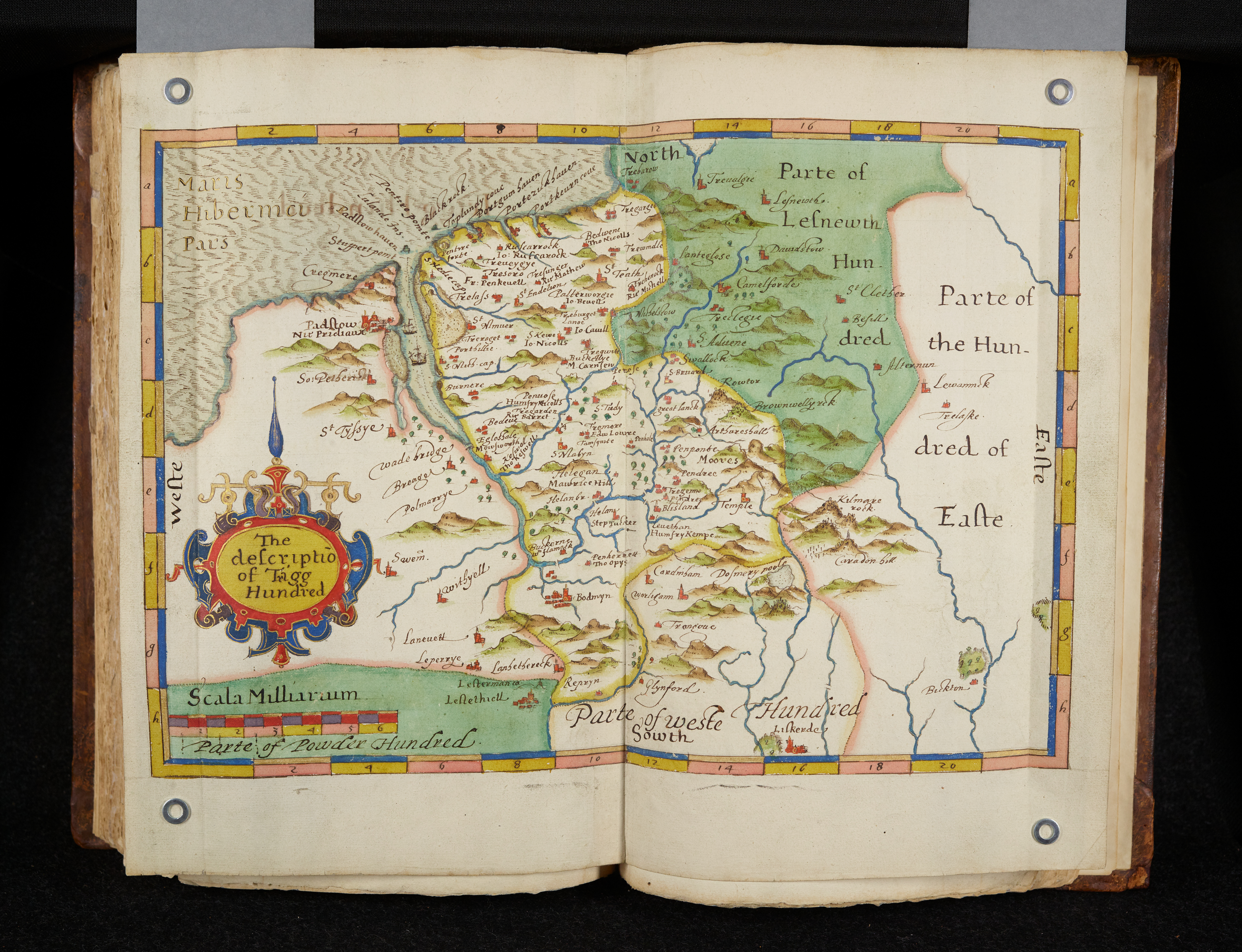
Norden's map of Trigg Hundred.

The parishes of Triggshire consisted of Bodmin, Blisland, St Breward, Egloshayle, St Endellion, Helland, St Kew, St Mabyn, St Minver, St Teath, Temple, St Tudy.

== Modern usage ==
The name Triggshire has been adopted by different clubs and organizations in the area. Triggshire Wind Orchestra, an amateur orchestra for wind players primarily from Sir James Smith's School, Wadebridge School, Budehaven School, however some students from Bodmin College and Launceston College also attend. The orchestra was set up in 1984 by conductor Janet Elston, who still conducts them today. After the success of the wind orchestra, Triggshire String Orchestra was set up, to cater for the string players from these schools.

Trigg Morris are a long established Morris Dancing club.

== Literature ==
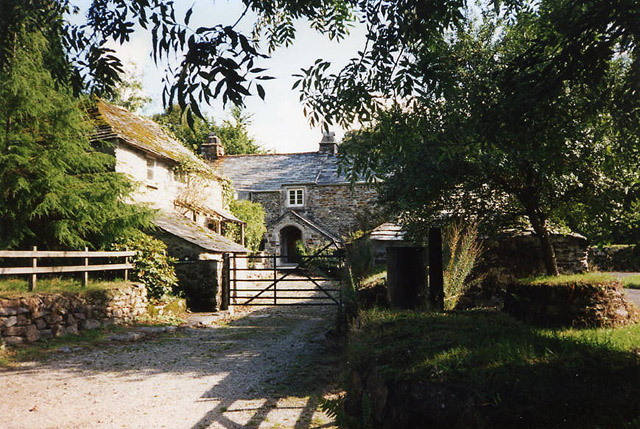
Trehudreth Mill

The historian Sir John Maclean (1811-1895) came from Trehudreth in Blisland and his "Parochial History of the Deanery of Trigg Minor" (1872-1879) in 3 volumes is the most detailed work of parochial history which deals with Cornwall (the deanery consisted of 20 parishes at the time he wrote). It was published in parts intended for binding as three volumes: there was also a separate edition of the part on Blisland. (His name was originally John Lean but he adopted that of Maclean, in the belief that he had Maclean ancestors, because a contemporary Lean was incriminated in the Bodmin Moor Murder. Two versions of the origins of at least some of the Lean families of Devon and Cornwall have been passed through the oral tradition. One of these went with a Lean family to Australia in about 1820, and was passed down to Mike Lean, patent officer at the University of Queensland. Both versions include the disinheritance and banishment of two Maclean brothers (thus sans Mac) from the west of Scotland to a farm near Bodmin, where they married two sisters and lived near Blisland.)
