= Philip Courtenay (died 1463) =

English noble (1404–1463)

Sir Philip Courtenay of Powderham
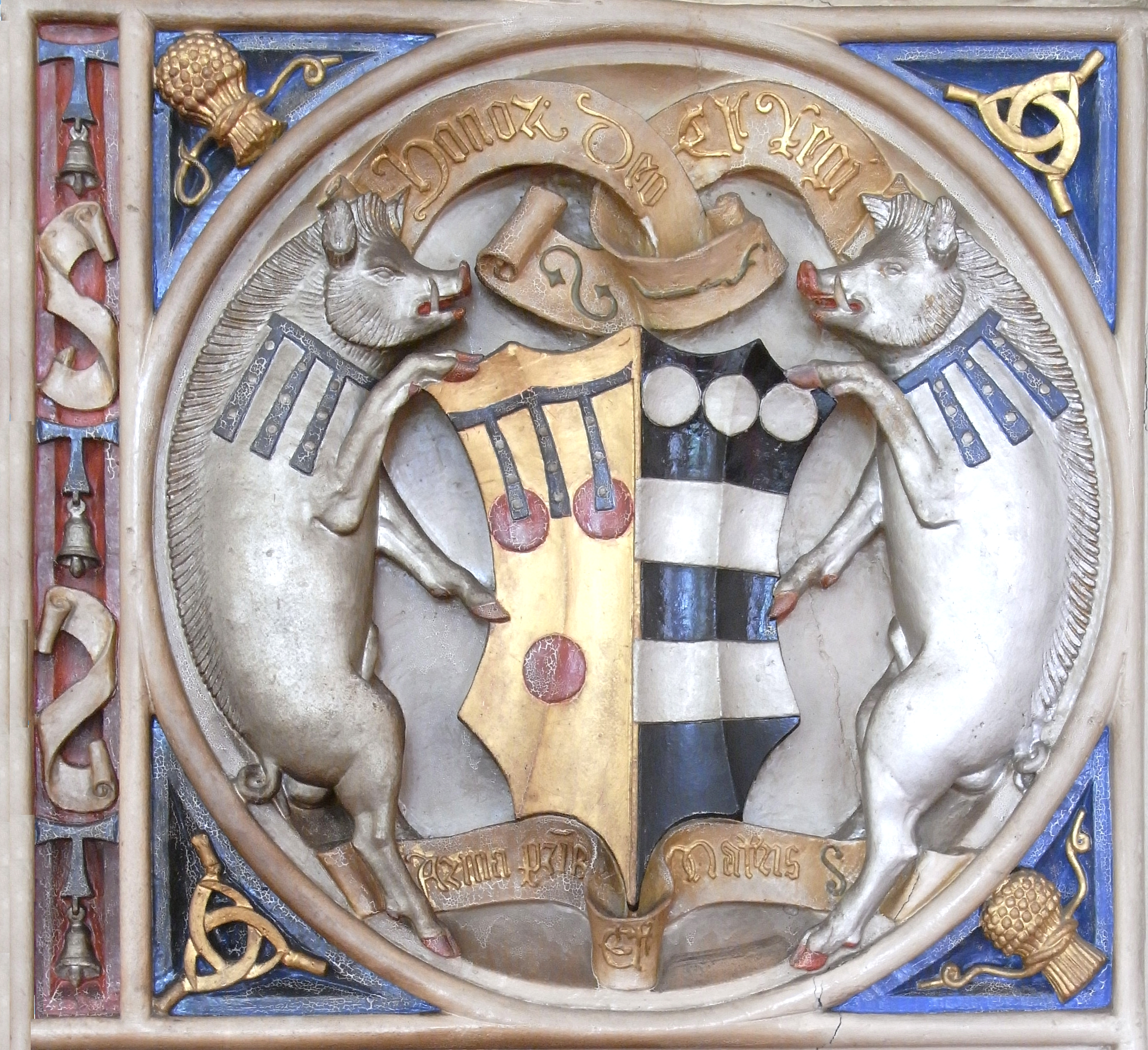
- Arms of Sir Philip Courtenay: Courtenay impaling Hungerford with supporters two Courtenay boars. In the spandrels are the heraldic badges of Hungerford: three conjoined sickles and the Peverell garbs. Detail from Bishop Peter Courtenay's Mantelpiece, erected by Sir Philip's son Bishop Peter Courtenay (died 1492), Bishop's Palace, Exeter.
- Born: 18 January 1404; Ashton, Devon
- Died: 16 December 1463 (aged 59)
- Noble family: Courtenay
- Spouse: Elizabeth Hungerford
- Issue: Sir William Courtenay; Sir Philip Courtenay; Peter Courtenay; Sir Walter Courtenay; Edmund Courtenay; Humphrey Courtenay; Sir John Courtenay; Anne Courtenay; Elizabeth Courtenay; Philippe Courtenay; Katherine Courtenay
- Father: Sir John Courtenay
- Mother: Joan Champernoun

Sir Philip Courtenay (18 January 1404 – 16 December 1463) of Powderham, (Note: This branch of the family is traditionally termed "of Powderham" to distinguish it from the senior line of Courtenay, Earls of Devon. Eventually, after the extinction of the senior line, the Powderham branch inherited the Earldom of Devon.) Devon, was the senior member of a junior branch of the powerful Courtenay family, Earls of Devon.

== Origins ==
Courtenay was born on 18 January 1404, the eldest son and heir of Sir John Courtenay (died before 1415) of Powderham, by his wife Joan Champernoun (died 1419), widow of Sir James Chudleigh and daughter of Richard Champernoun of Modbury.

He was the grandson of Sir Philip Courtenay (c. 1355 – 1406) and therefore the great-grandson of Hugh de Courtenay, 2nd Earl of Devon (died 1377), and Margaret de Bohun (died 1391). He had a brother, Sir Humphrey Courtenay, who died without issue. Philip was heir to his uncle, Richard Courtenay (died 1415), Bishop of Norwich and also to his other uncle Sir William Courtenay (died 1419)

== Seat ==
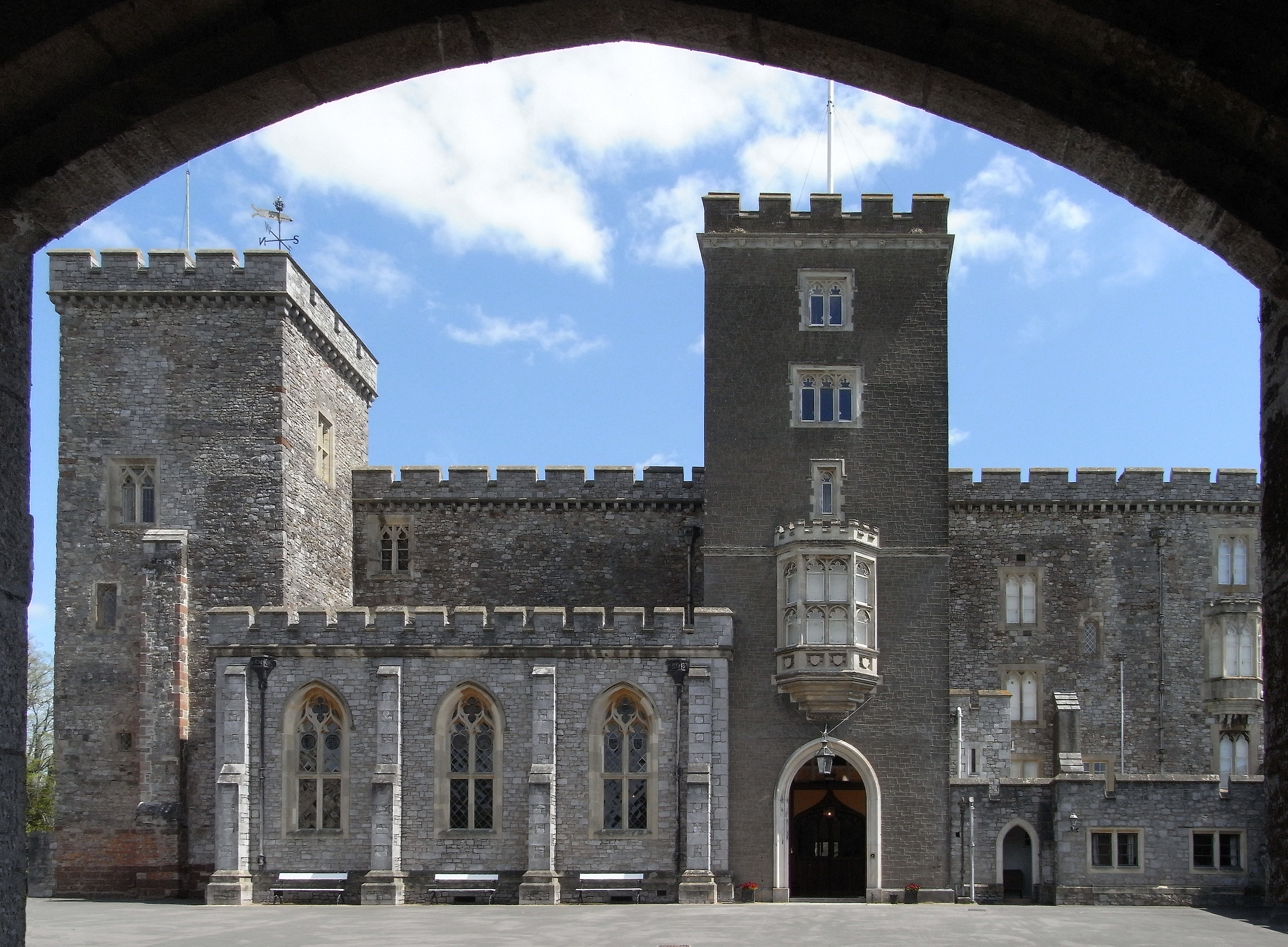
Powderham Castle, west front, viewed from under the Victorian gatehouse

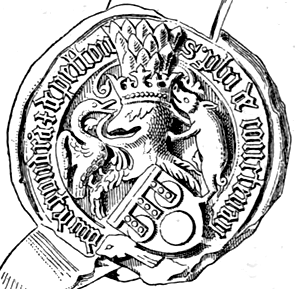
1435–6 seal of Sir Philip Courtenay (died 1463) of Powderham. Inscription: S(igillum) Ph(ilip)i Courtenay D(o)m(ini) de Poudra(m) & de Petton ("Seal of Philip Courtenay lord of Powderham and of Petton")

Courtenay's seat was Powderham Castle, given to his grandfather Sir Philip Courtenay (1340–1406), of Powderham, (a younger son of Hugh Courtenay, 2nd Earl of Devon (died 1377)), by his mother Margaret Bohun, whose father had given it to her as her marriage portion.

== Battle of Clyst Heath (1455) ==
He had been badly treated by his distant cousin Thomas de Courtenay, 5th Earl of Devon (1414–1458), whose seat was at Tiverton Castle, and during the turbulent and lawless era of the Wars of the Roses, he supported the challenge against the earl, for local supremacy in Devon, put up by the Lancastrian courtier, Sir William Bonville (1392–1461), of Shute. Sir Philip's eldest son and heir Sir William Courtenay (died 1485) had married Bonville's daughter Margaret, cementing the alliance between the two men. On 3 November 1455 Thomas de Courtenay, 5th Earl of Devon (1414–1458) at the head of a private army of 1,000 men seized control of Exeter and its royal castle, the stewardship of which was sought by Bonville, and laid siege to nearby Powderham for two months. Lord Bonville attempted to raise the siege and approached from the east, crossing the River Exe, but was unsuccessful and was driven back by the Earl's forces. Sir Philip otherwise played a limited role in the Bonville-Courtenay feud. On 15 December 1455 the Earl of Devon and Lord Bonville met decisively at the Battle of Clyst Heath, where Bonville was defeated and after which the Earl sacked Shute.

Sir Philip swore fealty to King Edward IV (1461–1483) as an MP at Parliament.

== Marriage and children ==
In about 1426 Courtenay married Elizabeth Hungerford, daughter of Walter Hungerford, 1st Baron Hungerford, Speaker of the House of Commons, Steward of the Household to Kings Henry V and Henry VI, and Lord High Treasurer. They had seven sons and four daughters:

- Sir William Courtenay (c. 1428 – September 1485) of Powderham, eldest son and heir, who married Margaret Bonville, daughter of William Bonville, 1st Baron Bonville (died 1461). He was father of Sir William Courtenay and grandfather of John Rogers (MP).
- Sir Philip Courtenay of Molland (c. 1430 – 7 February 1489), second son, MP, Sheriff of Devon in 1470.
- Peter Courtenay (died 22 September 1492), Bishop of Exeter and Bishop of Winchester.
- Sir Walter Courtenay (died 7 November 1506), who married Alice Colbroke, widow of John Vere (died before 15 March 1488), son of Sir Robert Vere (1410–1461), of Haccombe, by Joan Courtenay (died before 3 August 1465), widow of Sir Nicholas Carew (died before 20 April 1448), and daughter of Sir Hugh Courtenay by Philippa Archdekne.
- Sir Edmund Courtenay, 5th son, who married Jane Devioke, a daughter and co-heiress of John Deviock of Deviock near St Germans in Cornwall. For his descendants see Courtenay of Tremere.
- Humphrey Courtenay.
- Sir John Courtenay (died 1469).
- Anne Courtenay, who married Sir Thomas Grenville.
- Elizabeth Courtenay, who married three times:
  - Firstly to Sir James Luttrell (1426/7 – 1461) of Dunster Castle, Somerset. Her ledger stone displaying the image of a lady, survives in Dunster Church.
  - Secondly to Sir Humphrey Audley.
  - Thirdly to Thomas Malet.
- Philippa Courtenay, who married Sir Thomas Fulford (died 1489) of Fulford, Devon, whose step-father Sir William Huddesfield (died 1499) was the husband of Philippa's sister Katherine Courtenay.
- Katherine Courtenay (died 12 January 1515), who married three times:
  - Firstly Sir Seintclere Pomeroy (died 31 May 1471),
  - Secondly Thomas Rogers (1435-1489)
  - Thirdly Sir William Huddesfield (died 1499). of Shillingford St. George, Attorney General to King Edward IV.

== Death ==
He died on 16 December 1463.
