= Mulberry Downs Quarry =

Disused tin mine in Cornwall, England

Coordinates: 50.4589°N 4.7917°W

Mulberry Downs Quarry is a disused opencast tin mine in Cornwall, England, UK. Today the site is described as a 'chasm' being a steep or sheer-sided pit 700 foot (210 m) long and up to 100 foot (30 m) deep, and the quarry and immediate surroundings are heavily wooded. The quarry was designated as a Site of Special Scientific Interest (SSSI) in 1973 for its geological interest.

== History ==
The mine, known as Mulberry Hill Mine and locally just as Mulberry Mine has been producing tin since Roman times. The tin deposit itself has been described as "best example of a stockwork tin ore deposit in Britain"

The mine was part of the Lanhydrock estate, and there was sporadic mining between 1859 and 1916 (Note: other sources give the year of closure as 1912) with a total of 1,350 long tons (1,370 t) of tin being produced in this period.

Although the mine is opencast, two level adits were driven to the base of the quarry to transfer ore to a nearby crushing mill. The current depth of the workings is consistent with the water table measured at nearby boreholes; there is not any record of an engine house or pump at the mine it is unclear whether these were effective in increasing the depth that mining could take place.

== Geology ==
The quarry runs almost directly north-south, and follows veins of selenium and iron that run through the middle devonian bedrock. Modern boreholes taken in the area reveal Cassiterite immediately below the soil, with manganese over 100 foot (30 m) below and immediately above an iron-bearing layer. Below 350 foot (110 m) there are also ores of arsenic and copper.

== Geography ==
Tin is a necessary component of bronze, and export from Mulberry Mine to the Mediterranean could easily have been via Tintagel or the much nearer settlement on Stepper Point which was occupied in the Bronze Age, Iron Age and the Roman period.

In 1834 the Bodmin and Wadebridge Railway opened, with a branch line to Ruthernbridge provided to convey the output of the nearby mines, including Mulberry Mine, out to Wadebridge for transfer to sailing vessels for onward transport.

The 3.2-hectare (7.9-acre) disused mine, located within the civil parish of Lanivet, was originally notified as an SSSI in 1973. A second notification in 1985 increased the area slightly to 3.5-hectare (8.6-acre) The site was most recently surveyed in 2011 when the condition was described as favourable.
