= Trippet =

Trippet may refer to:

- Trippet stones, stone circle located on Manor Common in Blisland, in Cornwall, UK
- Oscar A. Trippet (1856–1923), judge of the United States District Court for the Southern District of California
- Trippet of Ogden, region encompassing part of the River Ogden, in Lancashire, England
