= William Courtenay (1451–1512) =

Arms of Courtenay of Powderham

Sir William Courtenay (1451–1512) of Powderham in Devon, was a Lancastrian loyal to Henry Tudor, the future King Henry VII.

Courtenay was the eldest son and heir of Sir William Courtenay (1428–1485) of Powderham and Margaret, daughter of William Bonville, Baron Chewton Mendip.

In about 1476 he married Cecily Cheney, daughter of Sir John Cheney of Pinhoe, by whom he had children including four sons:

- Sir William Courtenay (1477–1535), eldest son and heir.
- Sir James Courtenay (1479–1529) of Upcott, Devon.
- Piers Courtenay (1481 – 2 Oct 1508)
- Edward Courtenay

He also had seven daughters: Elizabeth (born 1483), Anne (born 1485), Joan, Cecily, Eleanor (born 1493), Margaret, and one other.

Daughter Margaret married Sir Thomas Danvers, son of Sir John Danvers by his wife, Anne Stradling*

Courtenay died in November 1512.

== Sources ==
- Vivian, Lt.Col. J.L., (Ed.) The Visitations of the County of Devon: Comprising the Heralds' Visitations of 1531, 1564 & 1620, Exeter, 1895
- [Full text of "Memorials of the Danvers family (of Dauntsey and Culworth): their ancestors and descendants from the conquest till the termination of the eighteenth century; with some account of the alliances of the family and of the places, where they were seated" ]
