= John MacLean (historian) =

British civil servant, genealogist and author (1811–1895)

Sir John MacLean KB, FSA
- Born: John Lean; 17 September 1811; Blisland, Cornwall, England
- Died: 5 March 1895 (aged 83); Clifton, Bristol, England
- Occupations: civil servant, genealogist, author
- Known for: historical and genealogical works
- Spouse: Mary Billing (m. 1835)
- Relatives: Scottish Clan Maclean

Sir John Maclean KB, FSA (17 September 1811 – 5 March 1895) was a British civil servant, genealogist and author.

== Life ==
Maclean was born John Lean, a son of Robert Lean, of Trehudreth in the parish of Blisland in Cornwall, where he was born in 1811. His mother was Elizabeth Every, a daughter of Thomas Every, of Bodmin, Cornwall. After genealogical research his ancestors were connected to the Scottish Clan Maclean, and in 1845, with his brothers, he added to his surname the prefix "Mac".

In 1837, he entered the Ordnance Department of the War Office, and became deputy auditor in April, 1865. He resigned this post on a pension, and received a knighthood in January, 1871. Sir John Maclean died at his residence, Glasbury House, Richmond Hill, Clifton, Bristol, of influenza. on Tuesday 5 March 1895.

== Family ==
In 1835, at Helland in Cornwall, he married Mary Billing, eldest sister and co-heiress of Thomas Billing, of Lanke, Cornwall.

== Writings ==
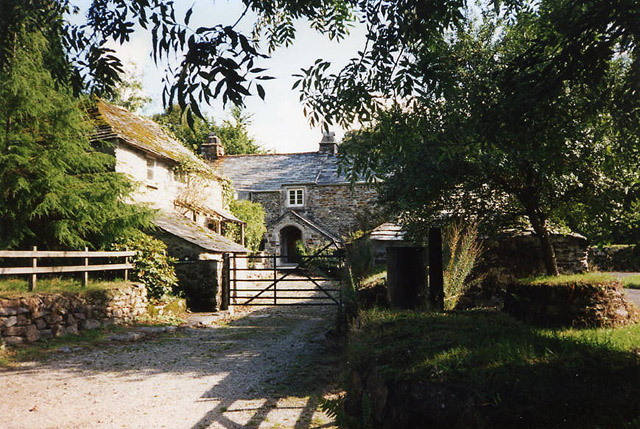
Trehudreth Mill

Sir John's Parochial History of the Deanery of Trigg Minor (1872–1879) in 3 volumes is the most detailed work of parochial history which deals with Cornwall (the deanery of Trigg Minor consisted of 20 parishes at the time he wrote). It was published in parts intended for binding as three volumes: there was also a separate edition of the part on Blisland. He was the author of several other historical works, including Life and Times of Sir Peter Carew, Letters of Sir Robert Cecil to Sir George Carew, and Memoir of the Family of Poyntz, (of Iron Acton, Gloucestershire).

== List of works ==
- Historical and genealogical memoir of the family of Poyntz : or, eight centuries of an English house (Volume pt.1)
- Historical and genealogical memoir of the family of Poyntz : or, eight centuries of an English house (Volume pt.2)
- Parochial History of the Deanery of Trigg Minor, 1874
- Parochial History of the Deanery of Trigg Minor, Vol.2, 1876
- Sir John Maclean Parochial and Family History of the Parish of St Menefreda alias St Minfre alias St Minver in the County of Cornwall; 1876
- Heraldic Visitation of Gloucestershire: Maclean, Sir John; Heane, W.C., eds. (1885). The Visitation of the County of Gloucester, taken in the year 1623, by Henry Chitty and John Phillipot as deputies to William Camden, Clarenceux King of Arms; with pedigrees from the heralds' visitation of 1569 and 1582-3, and sundry miscellaneous pedigrees. Harleian Society, 1st ser. Vol. 21. London.
