= Lesquite Quoit =

- Lesquite, Lanivet or Trebyan Quoit (Cornish)
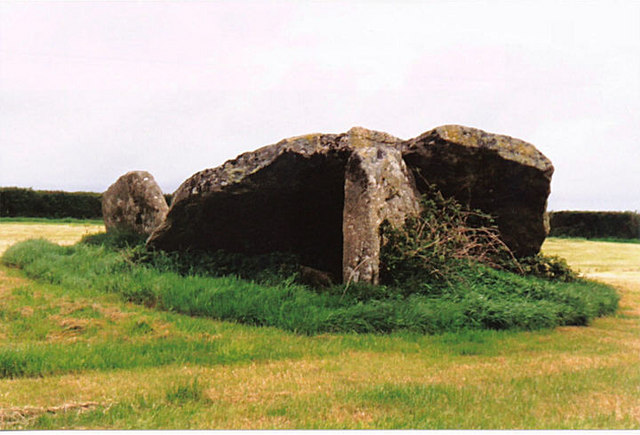
- Lesquite Quoit surrounded by farmland.

- Location within Cornwall
- 50°25′58″N 4°43′4″W
- Type: Portal dolmen
- Location: Lanivet, Cornwall, United Kingdom
- OS grid reference: SX07076276

History
- Built: 3500 - 2600 BC

Site notes
- Area: Central Cornwall
- Architectural style: Ancient
- Governing body: Historic England

Scheduled monument
- Official name: Portal dolmen 400m north east of Lesquite Farm
- Designated: 1932
- Reference no.: 1003047

Lesquite Quoit, (also known as Lanivet or Trebyan Quoit) is a portal dolmen, located near Lanivet in Cornwall, United Kingdom. It is a ceremonial funerary monument built around 3500 - 2600 BC and used by Britain's early farming communities. There are only 20 portal dolmens surviving in the United Kingdom. Many have suffered from stone-robbing and degradation over time. This example is well preserved, and is a scheduled monument. In 1870, J. Polsue recorded that the local tradition was of the stones "having been thrown to their present location from Helman Tor by the Devil playing quoits."

It is situated on the east slope of a ridge, overlooking Red Moor and across to Helman Tor. Historic England describes the structure as: "two upright orthostats and a leaning capstone set into a low stony irregular-shaped mound, possibly the result of field clearance. The capstone measures 5.1m by 3.3m. It is partially buried and leans against an upright measuring 1.8m high and 1.6m wide. Immediately to the north is a second upright measuring 1.2m high and 2.7m wide." In 1973 several stone socket holes, thought to "represent part of the kerb of the original circular or oval mound", were found 6m south of the orthostats, along with a post-hole thought to be related to an earlier structure beneath the mound. The quoit was first described and illustrated by Blight in 1858 and 1870, it has changed little since. In 1923 it was surveyed and described by Henderson, and subsequently by Pool, the Ordnance Survey and Barnatt. The Ordnance Survey designate the site as a Burial Chamber.

Lesquite Cross

Lesquite Cross 430 metres West at the entrance to Lesquite Farm, stands a wheel head Cornish/Celtic Wayside cross. Grade II listed. Reckoned to be on a N/S pilgrimage route to the Continent.

== See also ==
- Lanivet
- Scheduled monuments in Cornwall
