= Peter Courtenay (bishop) =

English bishop (1432–1492)

- Bishop of Winchester
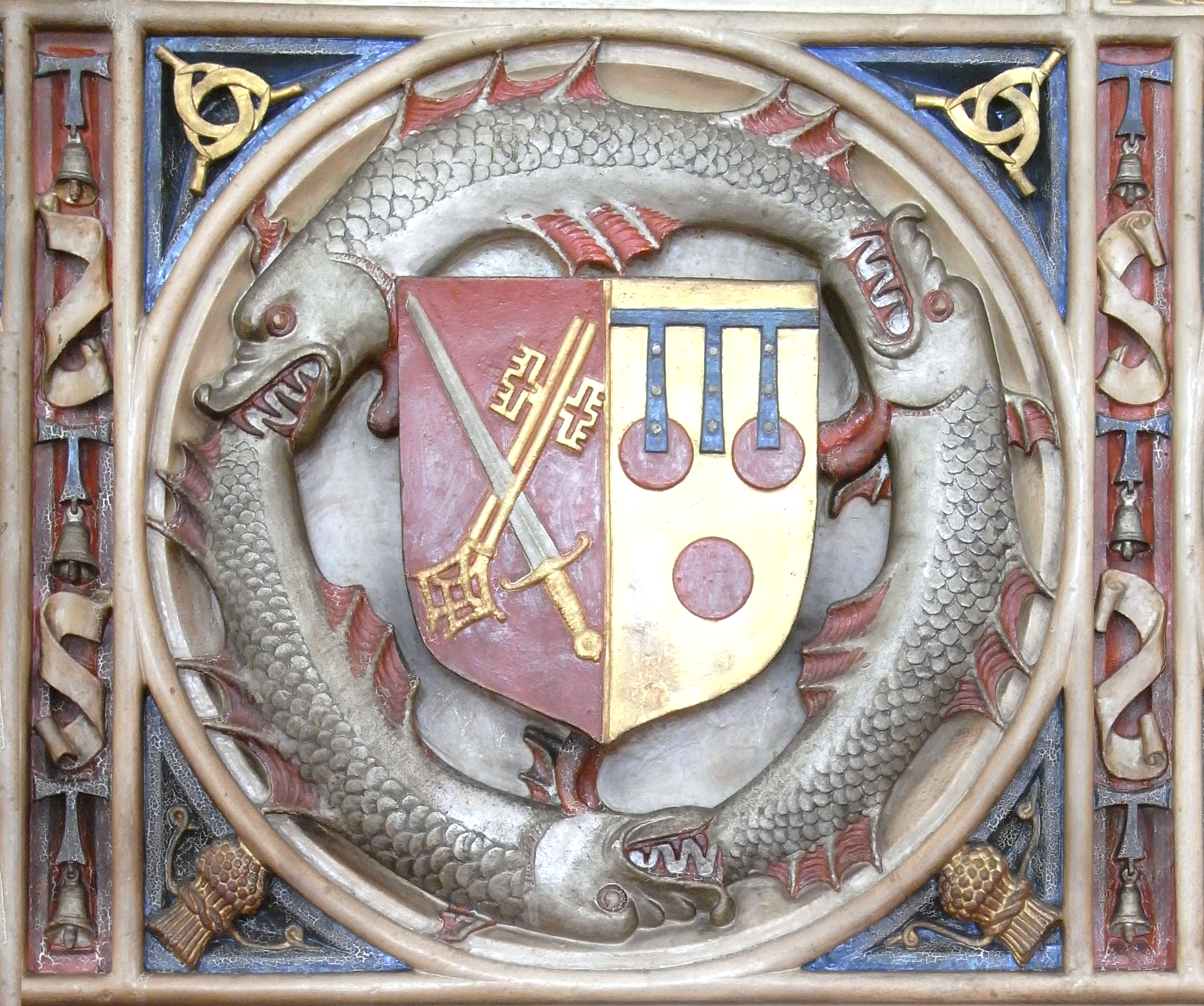
- Arms of Bishop Peter Courtenay (d.1492), showing the arms of the See of Exeter impaling Courtenay of Powderham, incorporating heraldic badges of dolphins of Courtenay of Powderham, Hungerford sickles and Peverell garbs. Detail from the Courtenay Mantelpiece, Bishop's Palace, Exeter
- Appointed: 29 January 1487
- Term ended: 23 September 1492
- Predecessor: William Waynflete
- Successor: Thomas Langton
- Previous posts: Bishop of Exeter; Dean of Windsor; Dean of Exeter

Personal details
- Born: c. 1432
- Died: 23 September 1492 (aged 59–60)
- Denomination: Catholic

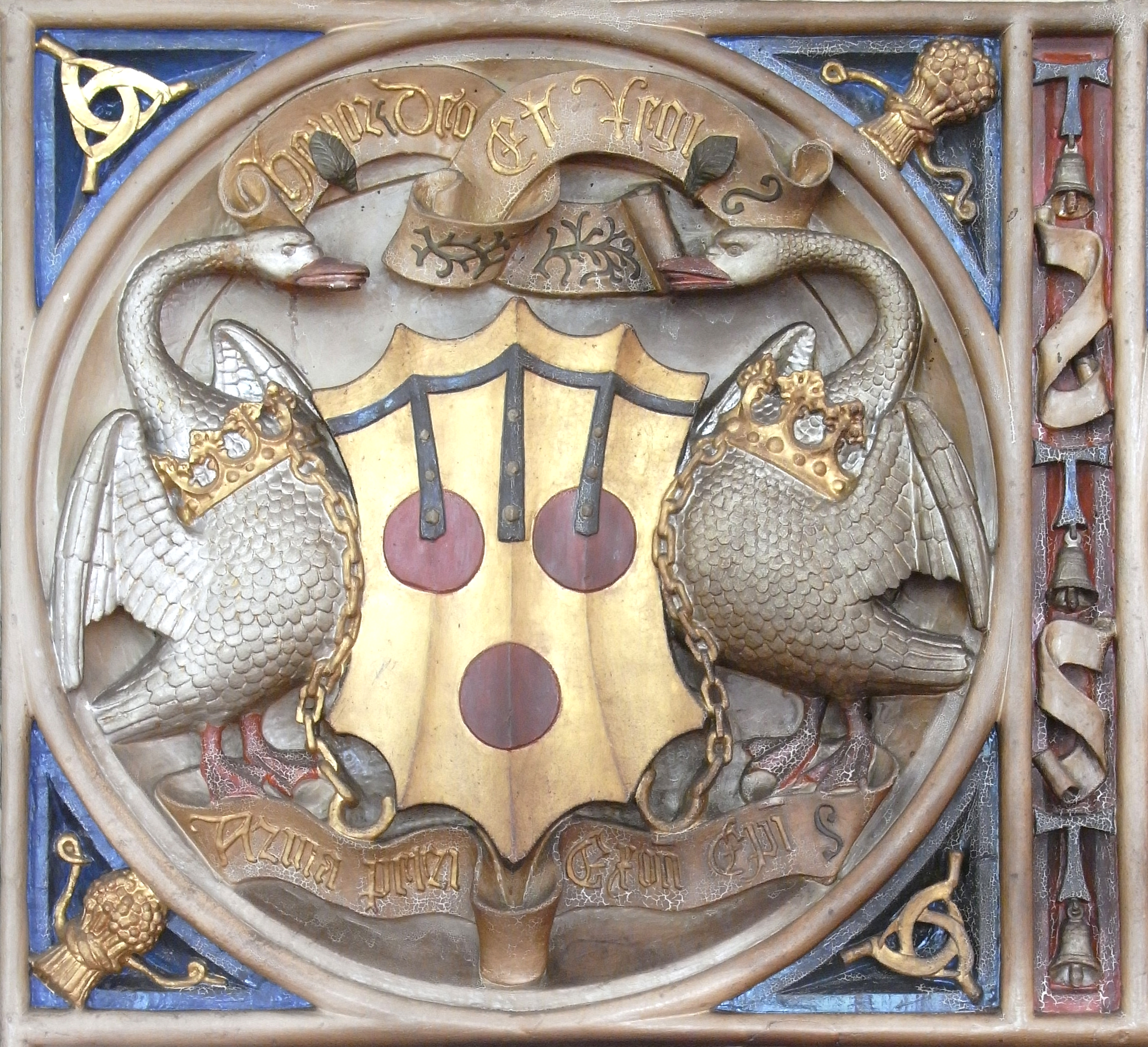
Arms of Bishop Peter Courtenay (d.1492), Or, 3 torteaux a label of 3 points azure each point charged with 3 plates in pale with supporters the Bohun swans, each collared with a crown and chained or. Gothic text above: Honor Deo et Regi (Honour to God and the king); beneath: "Arma Petri Exon(iensis) Epi(scopi)" (Arms of Peter, Bishop of Exeter). The sickles in triangle are a badge of the Hungerford family and the garbs a badge of the Peverells. The letters Tau with a bell pendant are a symbol of Saint Anthony the Great, reflecting Courtenay's Mastership of St Anthony's Hospital in London in 1470. Detail from Bishop Peter Courtenay's Mantelpiece, Bishop's Palace, Exeter

Peter Courtenay (c. 1432 – 23 September 1492) was Bishop of Exeter (1478–87) and Bishop of Winchester (1487-92), and also had a successful political career during the tumultuous years of the Wars of the Roses.

== Origins ==
Courtenay was the third son of Sir Philip Courtenay (d. 1463) of Powderham by Elizabeth Hungerford, daughter of Walter Hungerford, 1st Baron Hungerford (d. 1449), by his first wife Catherine Peverell, daughter of Sir Thomas Peverell, MP, of Parke and Hamatethy, Cornwall. He was a grandson of Sir Philip Courtenay (d. 1406) of Powderham, a younger son of Hugh Courtenay, 10th Earl of Devon (d. 1377). Courtenay was also a grand-nephew of Richard Courtenay (d. 1415), Bishop of Norwich, and a great-grand-nephew of William Courtenay (d. 1396), Archbishop of Canterbury. He came from a family of six brothers and four sisters.

== Career ==
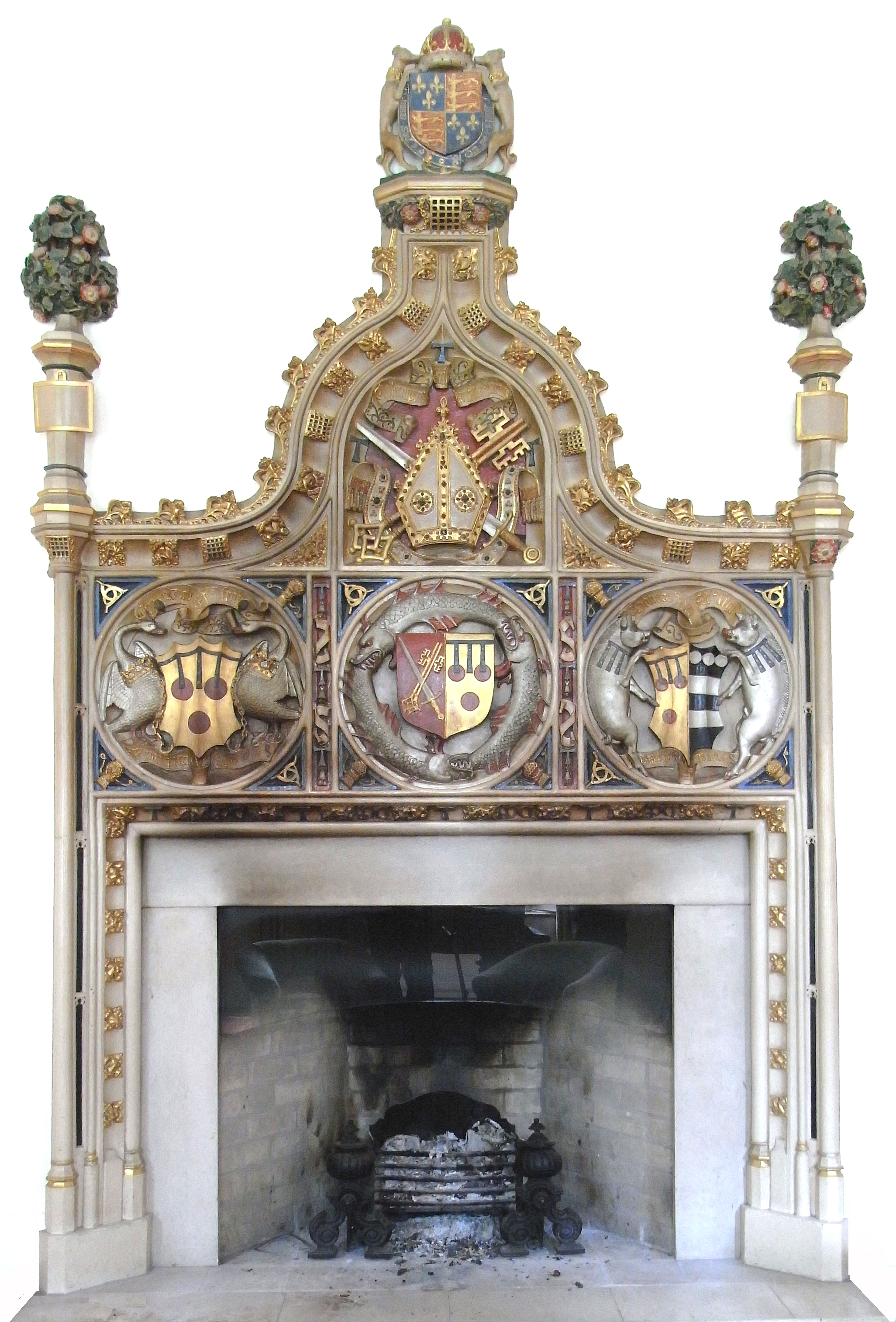
The "exceedingly ostentatious" Bishop Courtenay Mantelpiece, Bishop's Palace, Exeter, erected by Bishop Peter Courtenay

According to Horrox, Courtenay was admitted bachelor of civil law at University of Oxford in 1457, and continued his legal studies at the University of Cologne, matriculating in the faculty of law there in November 1457. By April 1461 he was studying law at the University of Padua, where he was elected rector.

Courtenay enjoyed ecclesiastical preferment from 1448 on. Among other appointments he was made Archdeacon of Exeter on 8 June 1453, prebendary at Lincoln in 1483, Archdeacon of Wiltshire in 1464, Master of St. Anthony's Hospital, St Benet Fink in the City of London in 1470, Dean of Exeter from October 1476 to March 1477, and Dean of Windsor in April 1477. On 14 June 1478 Courtenay was elected Bishop of Exeter, with papal provision taking place on 9 September 1478. He received his temporalities on 3 November, and was consecrated on 8 November at St Stephen's Chapel, Westminster.

Courtenay's ecclesiastical career ran side by side with involvement in the political affairs of the day. By June 1462 he had left Padua and was back in England, where he entered the service of King Edward IV, and was sent by the King to offer the Duke of Milan the Order of the Garter. In November 1463 he acted as the King's proctor in the papal curia. However, in 1470 both he and his elder brother, Sir Philip Courtenay, had joined King Edward's brother, the Duke of Clarence, in opposition to the King. Courtenay accommodated himself to the Lancastrian regime during the readeption, serving as secretary to King Henry VI. However, in 1471 he rejoined Clarence, and by March 1472 was secretary to Edward IV, who had taken back the throne. Courtenay was still serving as King Edward's secretary in May 1474, and appears to have become a member of the King's council in 1477–8.

After the death of Edward IV on 9 April 1483, Courtenay initially supported the new King, Richard III. However, in autumn 1483 both he and his younger brother, Walter Courtenay (d. 7 November 1506), attempted to incite a rising in Devon and Cornwall on behalf of Henry Tudor, the future King Henry VII. The rising failed, and Courtenay fled to the continent, joining Tudor in exile at Vannes, Brittany. In January 1484 he was attainted by Parliament, and his temporalities were forfeited. Courtenay accompanied Henry Tudor on his return to England, and after the victory at Bosworth and the death of Richard III, was made Keeper of the Privy Seal on 8 September 1485, and was one of the bishops who officiated at the new King's coronation. His attainder was reversed by Henry VII's first Parliament, and on 29 January 1487 he was translated to become Bishop of Winchester.

Courtenay continued to play a political role until his death, being present at the ratification of a treaty with Spain on 23 September 1490 and the creation of the King's eldest son, Arthur, as Prince of Wales on 29 November 1491. Courtenay died on 23 September 1492, and was buried in Winchester Cathedral.

== Shakespeare and Peter Courtenay, Bishop of Exeter ==
Courtenay's rising against Richard III is mentioned in Act IV Scene iv of Shakespeare's Richard III, although Shakespeare erroneously refers to Sir Edward Courtenay, the Bishop's cousin, as his brother:

== Citations ==
Political offices
Preceded by John Gunthorpe	Lord Privy Seal; 1485–1487	Succeeded by Richard Foxe
Catholic Church titles
Preceded by Henry Webber	Dean of Exeter; 1474–1478	Succeeded by Lionel Woodville
Preceded by John Booth	Bishop of Exeter; 1478–1487	Succeeded by Richard Foxe
Preceded by William Waynflete	Bishop of Winchester; 1487–1492	Succeeded by Thomas Langton
