= Stripple stones =

Henge and stone circle in Cornwall, England

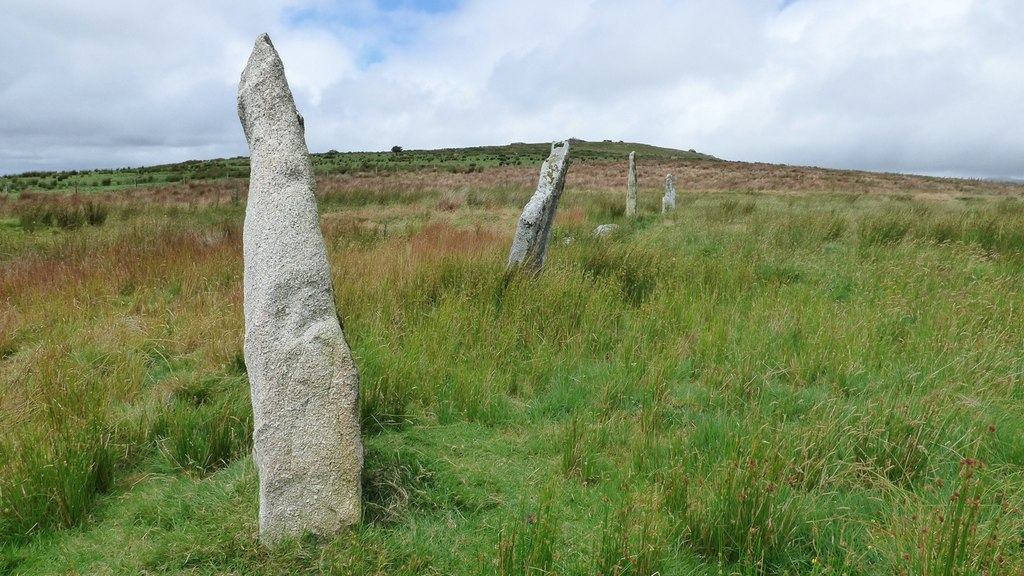

- Location within Cornwall
- 50.547032°N 4.621054°W
- Type: Henge and stone circle
- Periods: Neolithic / Bronze Age
- Location: Bodmin Moor, Cornwall

The Stripple stones (or Stripple stones circle) is a henge and stone circle located on the south slope of Hawk's Tor, Blisland, 10 kilometres (6.2 mi) north northeast of Bodmin on Bodmin Moor in Cornwall, England, UK.

== Description ==
First recorded by this name during the reign of Queen Elizabeth I the circle has been described by William Lukis as "the most interesting and remarkable monument in the county". It is surrounded by a circular ditch and vallum that forms a level platform 175 feet (53 m) in diameter. The circle is 145.5 feet (44.3 m) in diameter with four granite standing stones and several fallen. In the centre is a giant fallen menhir approximately 12 feet (3.7 m) long and 5 feet (1.5 m) at the widest point, split in three places. Lukis suggested that with an average spacing of 12 feet (3.7 m), there would have been thirty seven original stones, whilst Aubrey Burl suggested only twenty eight.

== Archaeology ==
The Stripple stones were excavated in 1905 by H. St. George Gray who found a burnt flint, three flint flakes, an ox bone and some charcoal and oak timbers in the surrounding ditch. He also detected an entrance from this facing southwest, directly towards the Trippet stones. Gray noted that the stones had only been set approximately 1.5 feet (0.46 m) deep into the ground. Four postholes were found surrounding the central stone which was discovered to have been offset from the centre of the circle by 14 feet (4.3 m) to the south southeast.

== Alignments ==
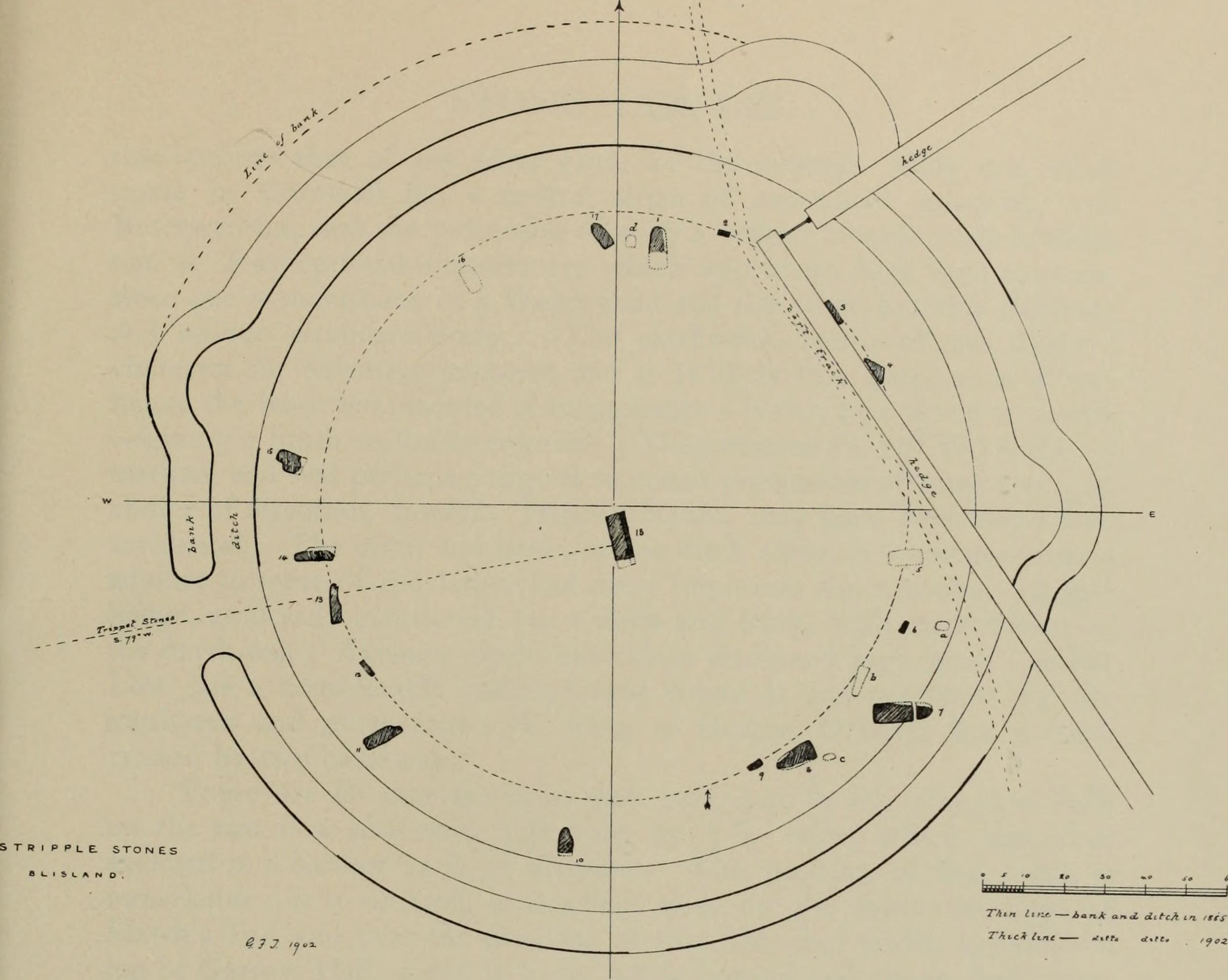
Plan of the Stripple stones

The vallum surrounding the circle has three semi-lunar projections facing towards the northwest, northeast and east. It has been completely obliterated to the south. Aubrey Burl suggested that from the location of the central stone, when upright, alignments with these bulges in the outer bank mark May Day sunset, Equinox sunrise and the major northern moonrise. He also suggested that the post holes may have been attempts to establish accurate backsights for alignments. Norman Lockyer suggested that sighted from the centre stone, the northeast projection would have aligned with Capella in 1250 BC.

== Literature ==
- William Borlase (1754). Observations on the antiquities, historical and monumental, of the county of Cornwall ...: Consisting of several essays on the first inhabitants, Druid-superstition, customs, and remains of the most remote antiquity, in Britain, and the British Isles ... With a summary of the religious, civil, and military state of Cornwall before the Norman Conquest ... Printed by W. Jackson, in the High-Strand.
- William Copeland Borlase (1872). Naenia Cornubiae: the cromlechs and tumuli of Cornwall. Llanerch. ISBN 978-1-897853-36-8.
- William C. Lukis (1885). The prehistoric stone monuments of the British Isles: Cornwall. Printed for Nichols and Sons for the Society of Antiquaries.
- Aubrey Burl (2005). A guide to the stone circles of Britain, Ireland and Brittany. Yale University Press. ISBN 978-0-300-11406-5.
