= Keybridge =

Coordinates: 50.535°N 4.706°W

- Location within Cornwall
- OS grid reference: SX083741
- Civil parish: Blisland
- Unitary authority: Cornwall
- Ceremonial county: Cornwall
- Region: South West
- Country: England
- Sovereign state: United Kingdom
- Post town: Bodmin
- Postcode district: PL30 4

Keybridge is a hamlet in the parish of Blisland, Cornwall, England. It is named after an old stone bridge across the De Lank River. The bridge is built of granite and dates from the 17th century or earlier; it is a Grade II listed building. It is in the civil parish of St Tudy
