= Bradford, Cornwall =

Hamlet in Cornwall, England

Coordinates: 50.54708°N 4.65559°W

Bradford: Cornish: Resledan
- Hamlet
- Location within Cornwall
- Civil parish: Blisland
- Unitary authority: Cornwall
- Ceremonial county: Cornwall
- Region: South West
- Country: England
- Sovereign state: United Kingdom
- Police: Devon and Cornwall
- Fire: Cornwall
- Ambulance: South Western

Bradford (Cornish: Resledan, meaning Wide Ford) is a hamlet in the civil parish of Blisland, in the county of Cornwall, England, UK, 10.3 km north-northeast of the town of Bodmin, north of the A30 road. Bradford is in the valley of the De Lank River on Bodmin Moor.
