= Merry Meeting =

Hamlet in Cornwall, England

Coordinates: 50°31′45″N 4°42′08″W

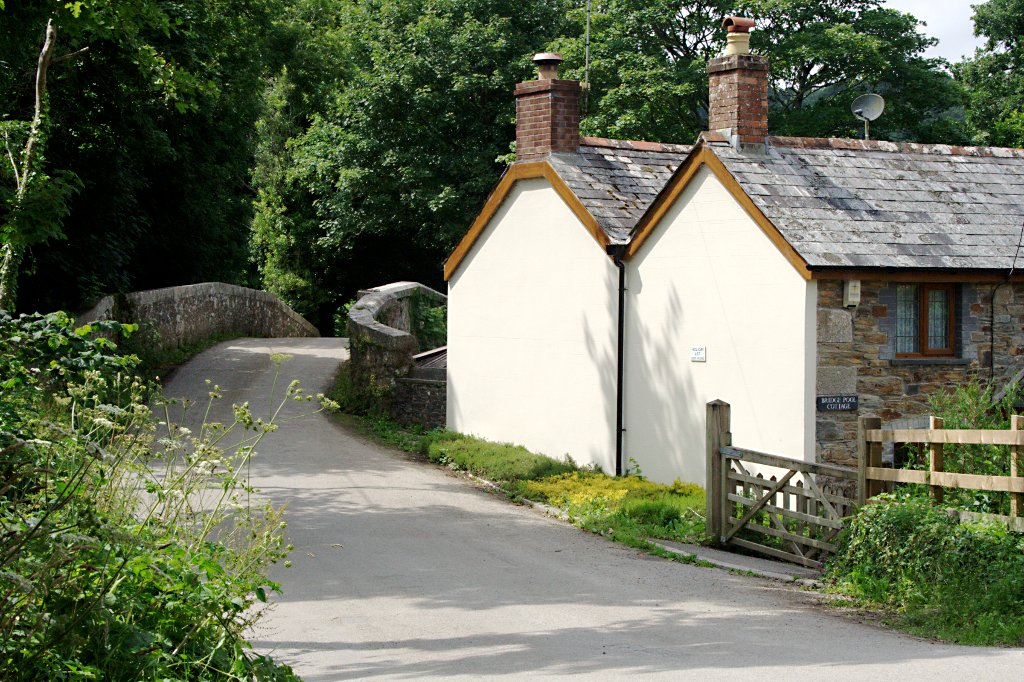
The Bridge at Merry Meeting

Merry Meeting is a hamlet in the valley of the River Camel, in the parish of Blisland, Cornwall, England.
