= Tregawne =

Coordinates: 50.462°N 4.816°W

Tregawne: Cornish: Tregyawen
- Location within Cornwall
- OS grid reference: SX002662
- Civil parish: Withiel
- Unitary authority: Cornwall
- Ceremonial county: Cornwall
- Region: South West
- Country: England
- Sovereign state: United Kingdom

Tregawne (Cornish: Tregyawen) is a hamlet in the parish of Withiel, Cornwall, England. It is between the hamlet of Ruthernbridge and the village of Withiel.
