= Withielgoose =

Coordinates: 50.4534°N 4.8147°W

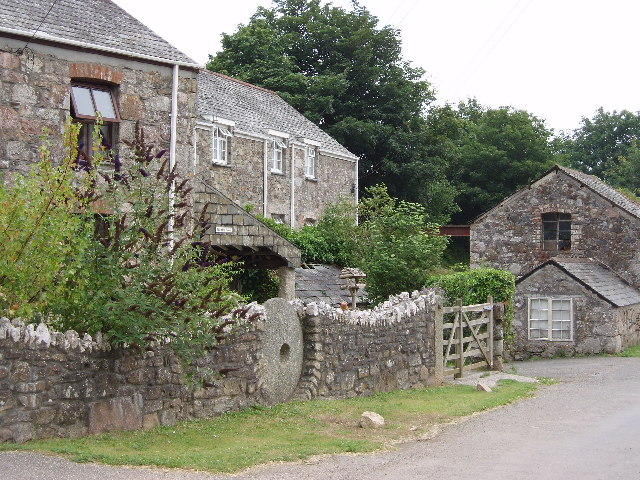

- Location within Cornwall
- OS grid reference: SX002652
- Civil parish: Withiel
- Unitary authority: Cornwall
- Ceremonial county: Cornwall
- Region: South West
- Country: England
- Sovereign state: United Kingdom
- Post town: BODMIN
- Postcode district: PL30
- Dialling code: 01208
- Police: Devon and Cornwall
- Fire: Cornwall
- Ambulance: South Western
- UK Parliament: North Cornwall

Withielgoose (Cornish: Gwydhyel Goos) is a hamlet in Cornwall, England, UK. Withielgoose, from the Cornish gwydhyel (woodland, wooded), and koos (wood) suggests the clearance of woodland to create agricultural land. The hamlet is accessed via Withielgoose Lane and contains Withielgoose Manor. Withielgoose belongs historically to the parish of Withiel along with Retire and Tregawne; the parish had a total population of about 300 in 1824. It lies about five miles west of Bodmin and six miles east-north-east of St Columb Major.

Withielgoose Manor belonged to Bodmin Priory and previously to William I by the Earl of Cornwall under the church of St Petroc at Bodmin. It was leased by the crown in 1539 to Richard Kendall, and, in 1588, granted in fee-farm to Richard Branthwayte and Roger Bromley. It was then occupied by the Coswarth family. Bridget was the sole heir of the Coswarths and married her cousin Henry Minors. Their daughter Anne inherited the manor and married Francis Vivian of Trewan Hall. The property then passed through their only child Mary who married Sir R. Vyvyan, Bart. of Trelowarren, the ancestor of Sir R. R. Vyvyan, Bart., a Tory politician who sat in the House of Commons for various periods between 1825 and 1857. The Vyvyan family still owned the manor in the early 1800s.

The Vyvyans were a prominent Cornish family who were members of Parliament, baronets, and landowners in Penwith and Kerrier since the 15th century. They have owned the large estate called Trelowarren in the parish of Mawgan-in-Meneage for nearly 600 years. The living of the rectory is attached to the manor.
