= Trebell Green =

Hamlet in Cornwall, England

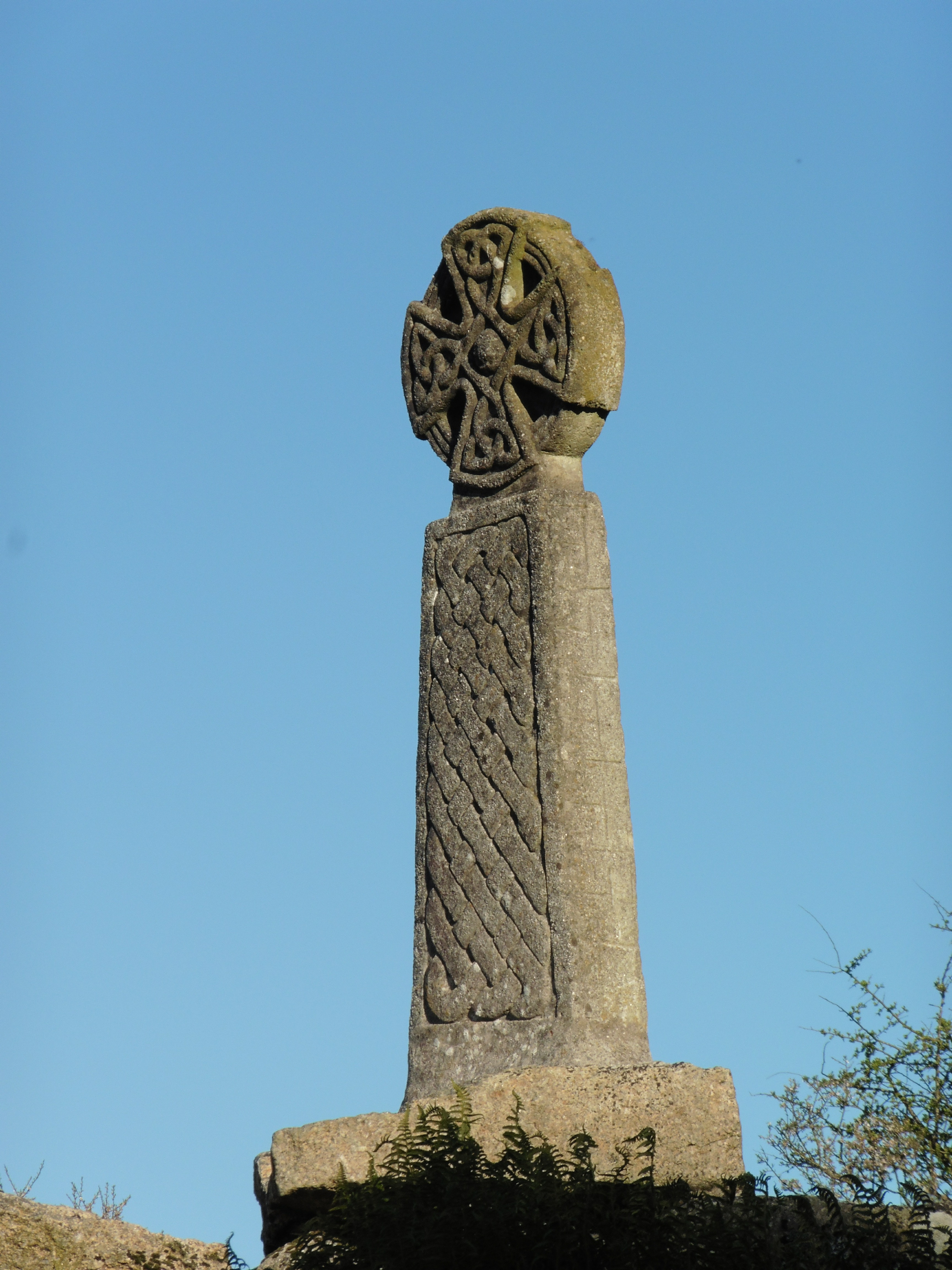
- Cross by the Saints' Way at Trebell Green
- Civil parish: Lanivet
- District: Cornwall
- Ceremonial county: Cornwall
- Region: South West
- Country: England
- Sovereign state: United Kingdom
- Post town: BODMIN
- Dialling code: 01208
- Police: Devon and Cornwall
- Fire: Cornwall
- Ambulance: South Western

Trebell Green is a hamlet in the parish of Lanivet, Cornwall, England, United Kingdom.
