= Bokiddick =

Hamlet in Cornwall, England

Coordinates: 50.4272°N 4.7456°W

Bokiddick: Cornish: Boskasek
- Hamlet
- Location within Cornwall
- Unitary authority: Cornwall
- Region: South West
- Country: England
- Sovereign state: United Kingdom
- Police: Devon and Cornwall
- Fire: Cornwall
- Ambulance: South Western

Bokiddick (Cornish: Boskasek, meaning Dwelling of Kasek) is a hamlet in Cornwall, United Kingdom. It is approximately one mile south of Lanivet at grid reference SX 051 622 and is centred on four farms.
