= Warleggan =

Hamlet and civil parish in Cornwall, England

Coordinates: 50.491°N 4.600°W

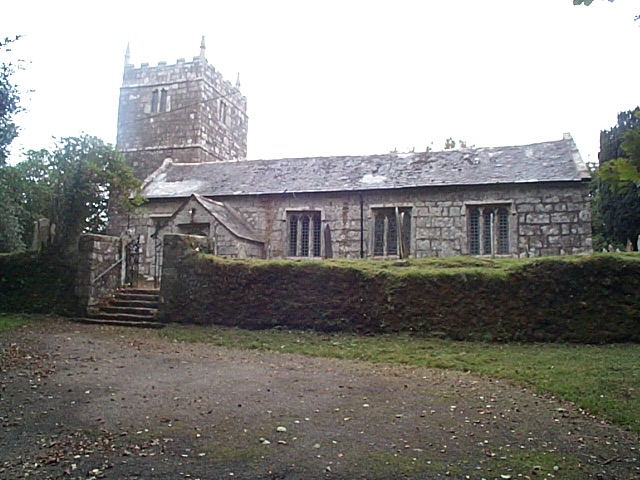
Warleggan Church

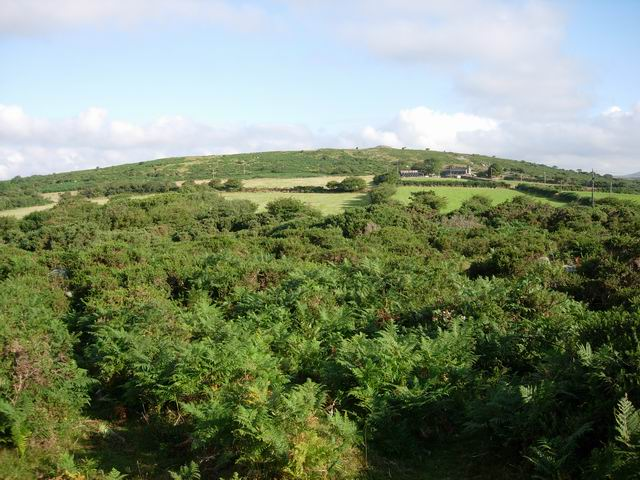
Warleggan Down

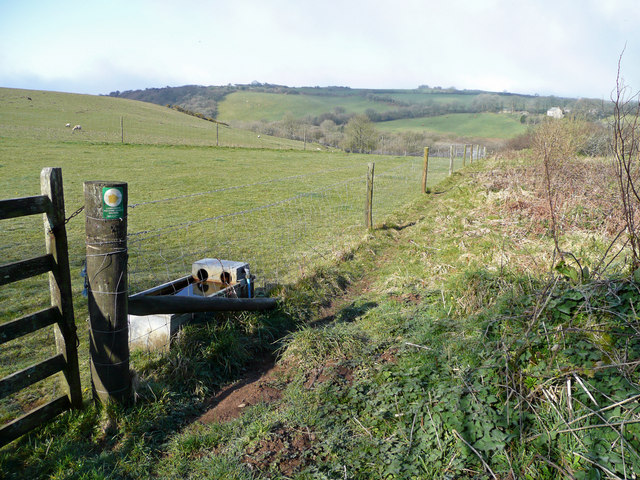
Footpath west from Cabilla Moorland

Warleggan (Cornish: Worlegan) is a hamlet and civil parish on the southern edge of Bodmin Moor in Cornwall, England.

The parish is roughly oblong in shape and includes the hamlet of Mount, southwest of Warleggan hamlet. The River Warleggan, a tributary of the River Fowey, runs through the parish, forming its western boundary in places. The population was 203 in the 2001 census, and had increased to 208 at the 2011 census. The population in 1801 was 116.

A road was built in 1953 linking Warleggan to the A38; until then it had been regarded as one of the most remote areas of Cornwall.

== Parish church ==
The parish church (dedicated to St Bartholomew) is partly Norman and partly 15th century in date. It formerly had a spire but this fell down in 1818 and was not rebuilt. The church consists of a chancel, nave and south aisle with a granite arcade. From 1931 until his death the Rev. Frederick W. Densham was Rector of Warleggan: he was unworldly and eccentric. The film A Congregation of Ghosts is based on his life. There is a Cornish cross in the churchyard; its original location is unknown but it was brought here from Carburrow. In 1858 it was found on Warleggan Down between Carburrow and Treveddoe; later in the 19th century it was moved to its present position.

There is also a former Methodist chapel in the parish.

== Cabilla Manor Wood ==
Cabilla Manor Wood, in the west of the civil parish, is a Site of Special Scientific Interest (SSSI) noted for its biological interest. The SSSI surrounds the River Warleggan, extending into Cardinham civil parish.

== Notable people ==
- Robin Hanbury-Tenison, explorer
