= Lamorick =

Coordinates: 50.448°N 4.768°W

Lamorick: Cornish: Nansmorek
- Location within Cornwall
- OS grid reference: SX036646
- Unitary authority: Cornwall
- Ceremonial county: Cornwall
- Region: South West
- Country: England
- Sovereign state: United Kingdom
- Post town: Bodmin
- Postcode district: PL30

Lamorick (Cornish: Nansmorek) is a hamlet in Cornwall, England. It is half a mile north of Lanivet {where the population for the 2011 census was included.} on the A30 main road.
