= John Courtenay of Tremere =

16th-century English politician

John Courtenay

Member of Parliament for Lostwithiel
- Incumbent
- Assumed office October 1553

Member of Parliament for Bodmin
- Incumbent
- Assumed office November 1554

Member of Parliament for Penryn
- Incumbent
- Assumed office 1555

Personal details
- Born: c. 1520–1521
- Died: 1 March 1560 Lanivet, Cornwall, England
- Resting place: Lanivet, Cornwall, England
- Spouse: Elizabeth Trengrove (later Trengove)
- Children: Jane Courtenay; Alice Courtenay; Richard Courtenay of Tremere; Henry Courtenay; George Courtenay
- Parents: Richard Courtenay; Jane Boscawen
- Education: New Inn

John Courtenay (1520/1521 – 1560) of Tremere (now Tremore) in the parish of Lanivet in Cornwall, was a Member of Parliament.

== Origins ==
He was the third child from Richard Courtenay's second marriage to Jane Boscawen. In his youth he appears to have been attached to Thomas Cromwell’s household. In the autumn of 1553, Courtenay used his family's connection with the Lostwithiel constituency to have himself elected the town's junior Member in Mary I's first Parliament. In the autumn of 1555, he was elected as a Member for Penryn. He died on 1 March 1560, being buried at Lanivet, where a monument was erected to his memory. He left life interest in the Tremere property to his widow, Elizabeth Trengrove, who later married Thomas Arundell.

He represented Lostwithiel in October 1553, Bodmin in November 1554 and Penryn in 1555.

== Children ==
1. Jane Courtenay
2. Alice Courtenay
3. Richard Courtenay of Tremere
4. Henry Courtenay
5. George Courtenay
