= Bodwannick =

Coordinates: 50.4576°N 4.7668°W

- Unitary authority: Cornwall
- Ceremonial county: Cornwall
- Region: South West
- Country: England
- Sovereign state: United Kingdom
- Police: Devon and Cornwall
- Fire: Cornwall
- Ambulance: South Western

Bodwannick Manor is a house north of Lanivet in mid Cornwall, England, UK. The gardens are a visitor attraction.
