= Trippet stones =

Stone circle on Bodmin Moor, Cornwall, England

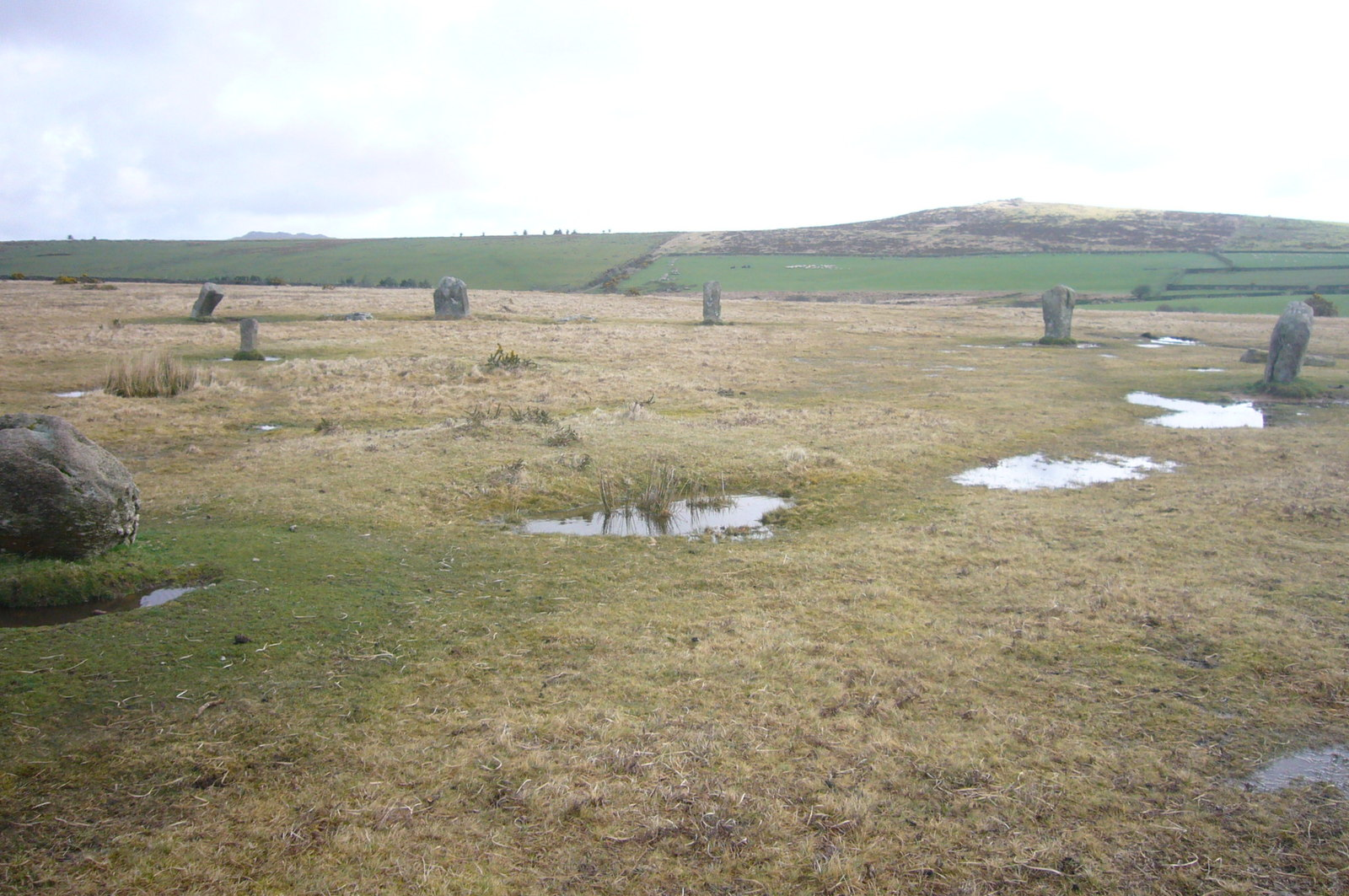

- Location within Cornwall
- 50.544821°N 4.639282°W
- Type: Stone circle
- Periods: Bronze Age
- Location: Bodmin Moor, Cornwall

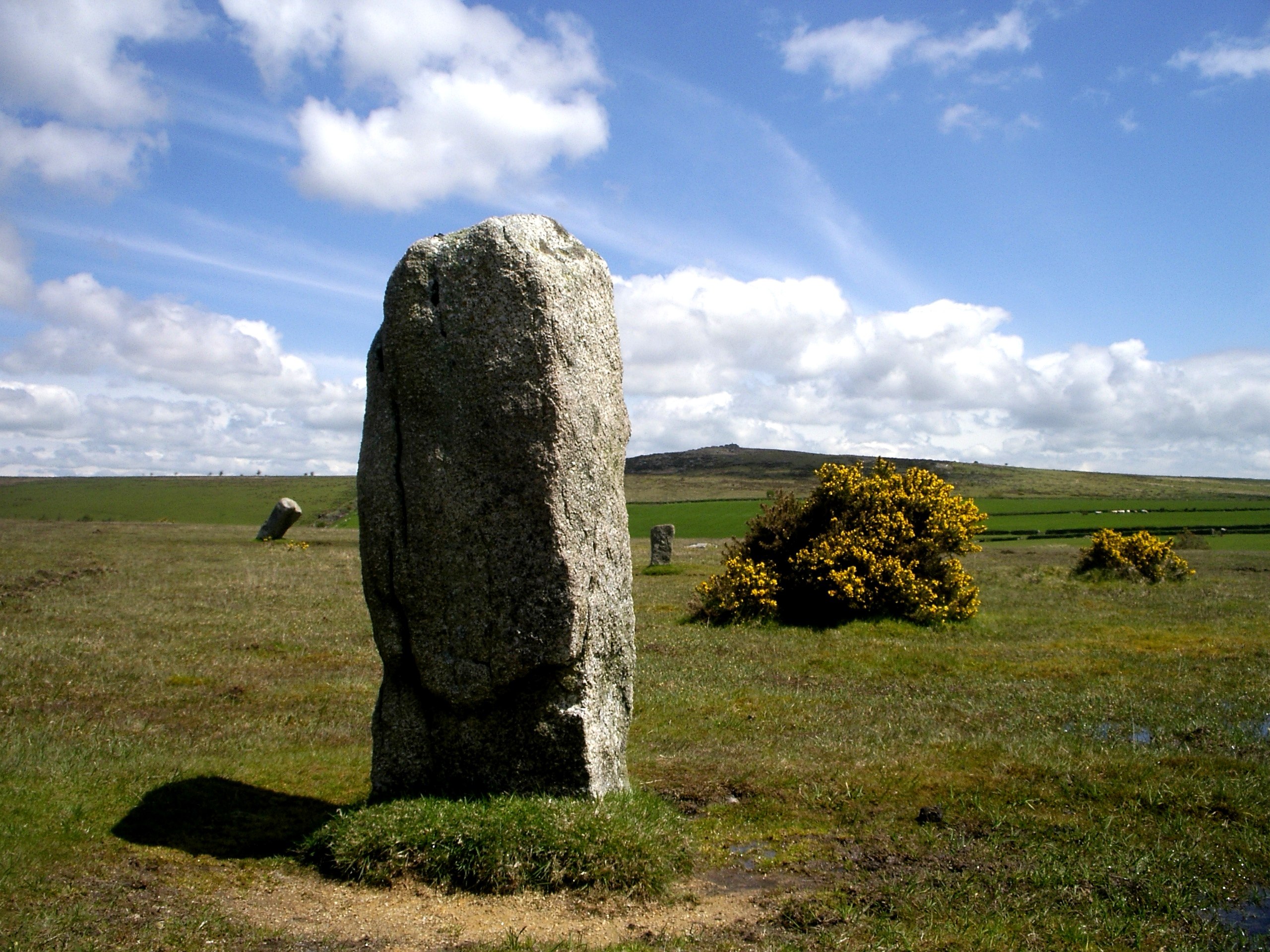
Trippet Stones Bodmin Moor, with Hawk's Tor in background.

The Trippet stones or Trippet stones circle is a stone circle located on Manor Common in Blisland, 9 kilometres (5.6 mi) north northeast of Bodmin on Bodmin Moor in Cornwall, UK. The Stripple stones are nearby.

== Description ==
The circle is situated on nearly level ground and has a diameter of 104.6 feet (31.9 m). It is made of eight upright granite stones with four others that have fallen. The stones are spaced on average around 12 feet (3.7 m) apart, the highest measuring 5.2 feet (1.6 m). The fallen stones are 6.8 feet (2.1 m) and 5.2 feet (1.6 m) long. William Lukis suggested there may originally have been as many as twenty-six menhirs that suffered at the hands of stone-breakers. Aubrey Burl suggested twenty eight, set up on opposite facing pairs and suggests the name represents the folklore belief that the stones were girls punished for tripping lightly on Sabbath.

The Stripple stones are visible around 1 kilometre (0.62 mi) eastwards over boggy ground. John Barnatt said that the Trippet stones "may replace (or complement) the Stripple stones as part of an overall building programme in the western half of Bodmin Moor".

== Archaeology ==
The Trippet stones were examined in 1908 by H. St. George Gray who excavated the nearby Stripple stones in 1905 and found a few flint flakes and an entrance from this facing southwest, directly towards the Trippet stones.

== Alignments ==
Norman Lockyer visited the site in 1907 and suggested the date of the circle's construction to be around 1700 BC by calculating an alignment of Arcturus over Rough Tor. Lockyer also noted an eleven degree alignment between Trippet stones and Leaze stone circle, but suggested if this alignment were to mean anything, it would have to be with regards stellar rising alignments as it is outside of the sun's path.

== Literature ==
- William Borlase (1754). Observations on the antiquities, historical and monumental, of the county of Cornwall ...: Consisting of several essays on the first inhabitants, Druid-superstition, customs, and remains of the most remote antiquity, in Britain, and the British Isles ... With a summary of the religious, civil, and military state of Cornwall before the Norman Conquest ... Printed by W. Jackson, in the High-Strand.
- William Copeland Borlase (1872). Naenia Cornubiae: the cromlechs and tumuli of Cornwall. Llanerch. ISBN 978-1-897853-36-8.
- William C. Lukis (1885). The prehistoric stone monuments of the British Isles: Cornwall. Printed for Nichols and Sons for the Society of Antiquaries.
- Aubrey Burl (2005). A guide to the stone circles of Britain, Ireland and Brittany. Yale University Press. ISBN 978-0-300-11406-5.
