= Nanstallon =

Village in Cornwall, England

Coordinates: 50.4705°N 4.7659°W

Nanstallon: Cornish: Nansalen
- Location within Cornwall
- OS grid reference: SX038671
- Civil parish: Lanivet
- Unitary authority: Cornwall
- Ceremonial county: Cornwall
- Region: South West
- Country: England
- Sovereign state: United Kingdom
- Post town: BODMIN
- Postcode district: PL30
- Dialling code: 01208
- Police: Devon and Cornwall
- Fire: Cornwall
- Ambulance: South Western
- UK Parliament: North Cornwall

Nanstallon (Cornish: Nansalen) is a village in mid-Cornwall, England, United Kingdom. It is situated approximately two miles (3 km) west of Bodmin.

Nanstallon is in the civil parish of Lanivet overlooking the River Camel valley and the Camel Trail, a long distance path. The present terminus of the Bodmin and Wenford Railway at Boscarne is half-a-mile (0.8 km) from the village. The site of the former Nanstallon Halt station is an access point to the Camel Trail. St Stephen's Church, Nanstallon, is a Church of England chapel-of-ease in the parish of Lanivet.

== Nanstallon Roman fort ==
A first-century Roman fort was excavated at Nanstallon in 1965 by Aileen Fox and Professor W. L. D. 'Bill' Ravenhill. Until recently (2007) it was the second Roman fort in Cornwall, but following a geophysical survey another Roman fort has been found 9 kilometres (5.6 mi) away near Restormel Castle. Constructed c. AD 55–60, Nanstallon fort is situated in mid-Cornwall near the Fowey-Camel trade and communication route.

Nanstallon was probably a forward operating base and was strategically well placed for a Roman presence to be felt. However, the Roman Legion at Exeter was withdrawn c. AD 75, and, with no Roman town west of Isca Dumnoniorum, Cornwall settled down to four centuries of nominal Roman rule.

== Nanstallon United Youth Football Club ==
Nanstallon United Youth Football Club was formed in 1988 in aid of the local children in the village. The ex-Liverpool and England left back Alan Kennedy attended an early training session in 1989 whilst on holiday in Cornwall. In 2005 the club's changing facilities burnt down, and the story was featured on BBC Radio Cornwall. Steve McFadden, an actor in Eastenders (Phil Mitchell), organised a charity match between Eastenders cast members and the BBC Radio Cornwall presenters. The Eastenders team won 1–0 at Bodmin Town's football ground. The celebrity match raised £7000 for Nanstallon United.
