= Mount, Cornwall =

Village in Cornwall, England

Coordinates: 50.482°N 4.613°W

Mount: Cornish: Mont
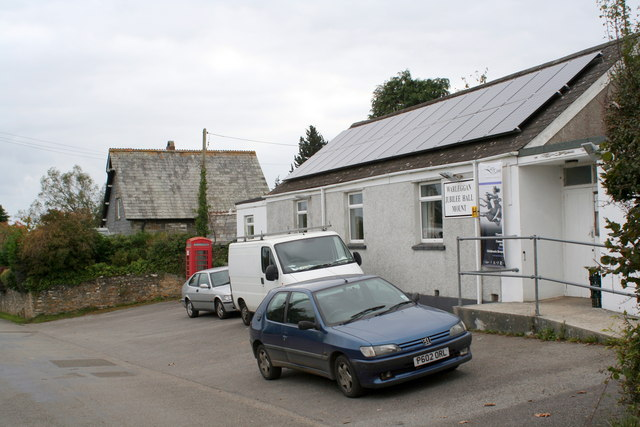
- Warleggan Jubilee Hall, Mount

- Location within Cornwall
- OS grid reference: SX147680
- Civil parish: Warleggan
- Unitary authority: Cornwall
- Ceremonial county: Cornwall
- Region: South West
- Country: England
- Sovereign state: United Kingdom

Mount (Cornish: Mont) is a village in the parish of Warleggan in east Cornwall, England. It lies south-west of Warleggan village.
