= Blisland =

Village in Cornwall, England

Coordinates: 50.528°N 4.681°W

Blisland: Cornish: Blyslann
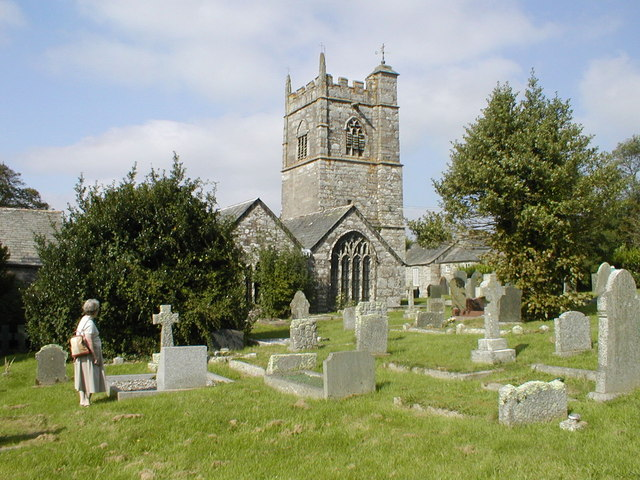
- Blisland Parish Church

- Location within Cornwall
- Population: 608 (United Kingdom Census 2011 including Bradford and Lank)
- OS grid reference: SX101732
- Civil parish: Blisland
- Unitary authority: Cornwall
- Ceremonial county: Cornwall
- Region: South West
- Country: England
- Sovereign state: United Kingdom
- Post town: BODMIN
- Postcode district: PL30
- Dialling code: 01208
- Police: Devon and Cornwall
- Fire: Cornwall
- Ambulance: South Western
- UK Parliament: North Cornwall

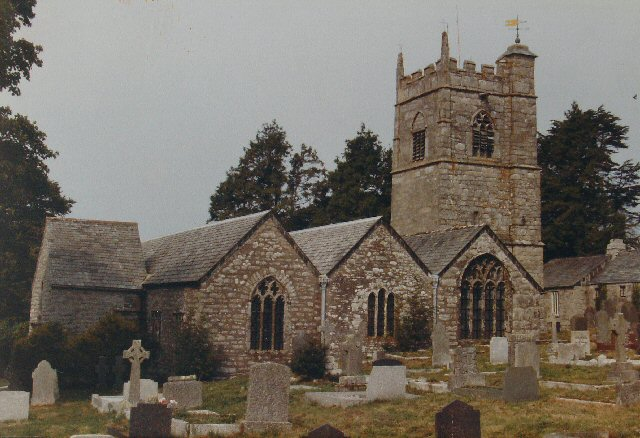
Blisland Parish Church from the east

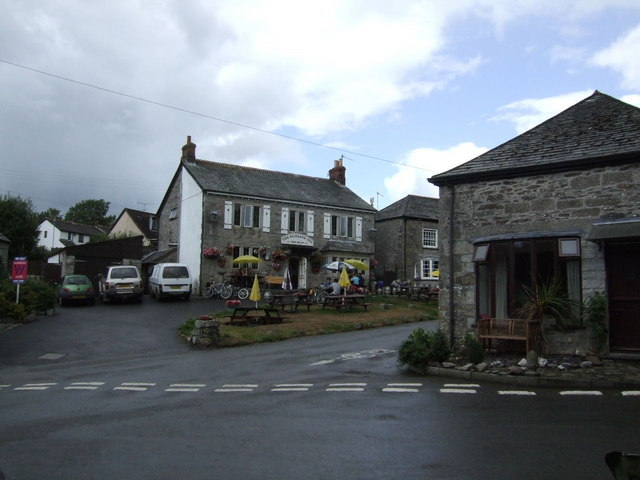
The Blisland Inn

Blisland (Cornish: Blyslann) is a village and civil parish in Cornwall, England, United Kingdom. It is approximately five miles northeast of Bodmin. According to the 2001 census, the parish had a population of 565. This had increased to 608 at the 2011 census.

The parish is entirely rural in character, the northeast being moorland and the southwest lower lying farmland. The parish is bordered to the north by St Breward parish; to the west by St Mabyn and Helland parishes; to the south by Cardinham, Warleggan, and St Neot parishes; and to the northeast by Altarnun parish.

The hamlets of Bradford, Keybridge, Merry Meeting, Pendrift, Tresarrett and Waterloo are in the parish. Blisland is sometimes said to be the only village in Cornwall with a village green, however Herodsfoot and Talskiddy are others.

== Toponymy ==
The derivation of the placename is unclear – the earliest known form is Bleselonde in 1284. This appears to include the Old English land meaning estate, the first element is however obscure. Ekwall mentions forms such as Bloiston from documents 1177–1198 and suggests that the first element is the same as in Blisland (with -ton as suffix) and that it is the original Celtic name (etym. dub.). Charles Henderson in the Cornish Church Guide mentioned the older form as Bliston, thought to mean Heath-Town. In Domesday Book (1086) the manor is entered as Gluston and so probably it was really Bluston from Anglo-Saxon times to the 12th century, and by 1284 the new 'Blisland' form was adopted.

== History and antiquities ==
On Blisland Manor Common is the prehistoric stone circle known as the Trippet stones; and on Hawkstor Down a henge monument the Stripple stones. Blisland Manor House is 16th century with later alterations; Lavethan House mid-17th century; and the house at Trewardale 1773, enlarged 1839. Lavethan house (1653) incorporates parts of the 15th century. The archway was brought from another site. Early clapper bridges at Bradford and Poleys Bridge (on the River Camel) built of granite in 1839 are also noteworthy. Blisland Manor was in the hands of the family of Billing for many years: they were also landowners at St Breward and elsewhere.

Trehudreth was the seat of the family of Lean among whose members was Sir John Maclean (originally John Lean). Trewardale is the seat of the family of Edward-Collins amongst whose members were General Charles Edward-Collins, High Sheriff of Cornwall; Brigadier Thurston Edward-Collins and Major Charles F. T. Edward-Collins (also High Sheriff of Cornwall).

Arthur Langdon (1896) records twelve stone crosses in the parish, of which one is at St Pratt's Well and four are at Lavethan. Others are Peverell's cross and crosses at Cross Park, in the village, at Tregaddick and two crosses at Trewardale. Andrew Langdon (1996) records crosses at Cross Park, in the churchyard, in the village, as well as St Pratt's Cross, Peverall's Cross, one at Tregaddick, three at Lavethan and three at Trewardale. A cross formerly at Lavethan, Blisland, was sold in 1991 and set up in a cottage garden in Newquay; another was taken to St Just in Penwith.

Jubilee Rock on Pendrift Common is a Grade II listed decorated boulder. Pendrift common was also the home of a Logan stone which ceased to move, probably during the 18th century. This stone is sometimes identified with Jubilee Rock, but the dimensions are significantly different although the stone may have topped Jubilee Rock in the past.

At Durfold there was a great 50-ft waterwheel which was used to operate, through a flat rod 1.25 miles long, a 14-in pump at Parkyn's china clay works at Temple. This wheel was made at Hawarden in 1865 and shipped to Laxey, Isle of Man; after use in the silver mines there it was dismantled and brought to Wadebridge by sea and rail, then hauled to Durfold by traction engine and re-erected.

== Churches and schools ==
Blisland Parish Church

The parish church (Norman with some later mediaeval work) is dedicated to Saints Hyacinth and Protus. (Locally the saint would be called St Pratt rather than Protus.) Dr Sidney J. Madge published in 1950 a good account of the church and its two patron saints entitled Blisland Church and its Patron Saints; a 2nd edition was issued in 1965 with a preface by John Betjeman. Charles Henderson, writing in the Cornish Church Guide (1925) suggests that Lavethan (formerly Lanedewen) may record the original dedication of the church since the second element may be St Adwen (patron of Advent). The present form of the dedication relies on identifying the St Pratt of tradition with St Protus Martyr.

The extensive restoration includes work by Ninian Comper and F. C. Eden. According to Betjeman: "As a restoration and even improvement on a medieval church, this holy and peaceful place ... can hardly be bettered in the kingdom." In the church is the early 15th century brass of John Balsam, formerly rector here.

St Catherine's Church, Temple

At Temple is the church of St Catherine, originally also a parish church, but the parish of Temple was merged with Blisland in 1934.

Blisland Primary School

Blisland School is located just outside Blisland in a hamlet named Waterloo on the edge of Bodmin Moor.

== Social life ==
=== Cornish wrestling ===
Cornish wrestling tournaments, for prizes, were held in Blisland in the 1800s.

=== Public house ===
The Blisland Inn was the winner of the National Pub of the Year (awarded by CANRA) in 2000.

== Notable residents ==
- Churton Fairman (1924–1997), also known as Mike Raven, radio DJ, sculptor and actor
- John MacLean, historian and genealogist

== Gallery ==
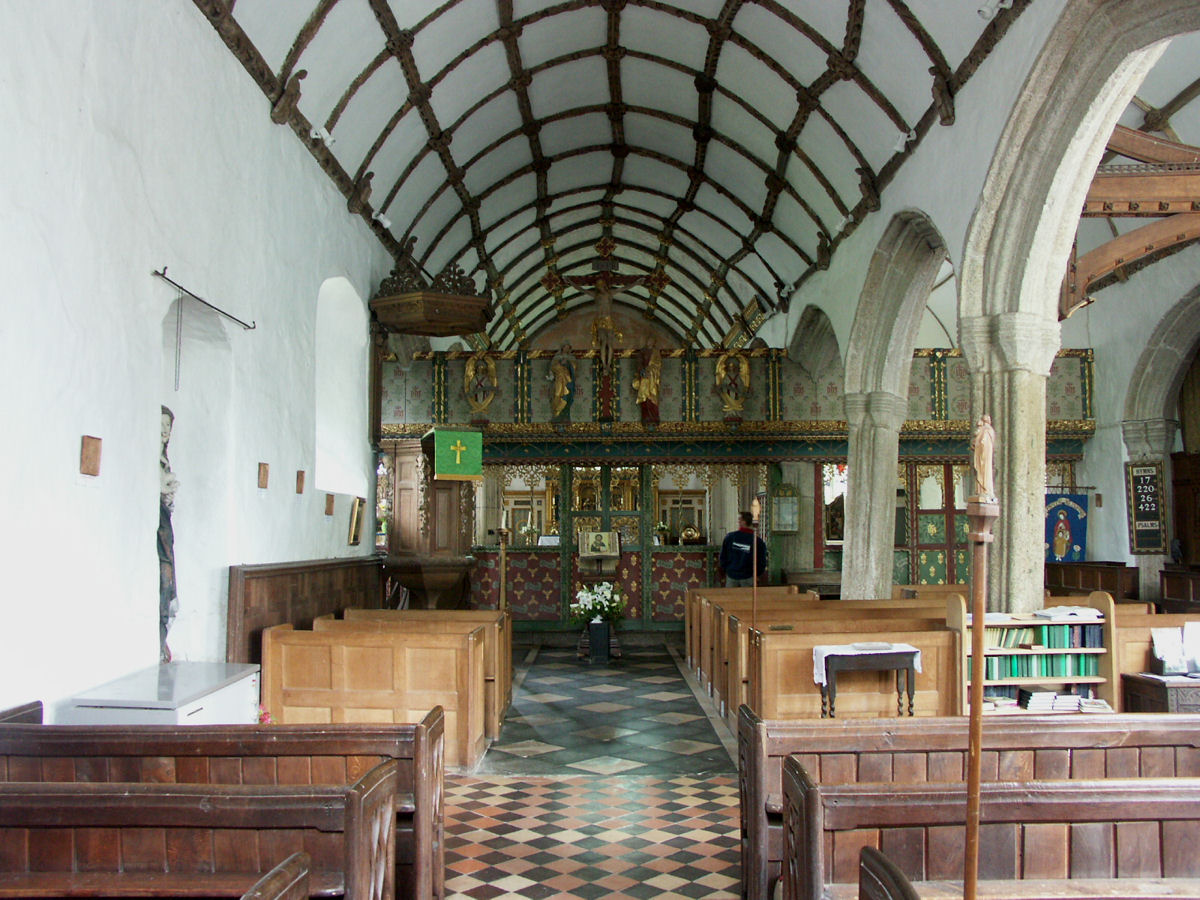
Blisland Parish Church interior

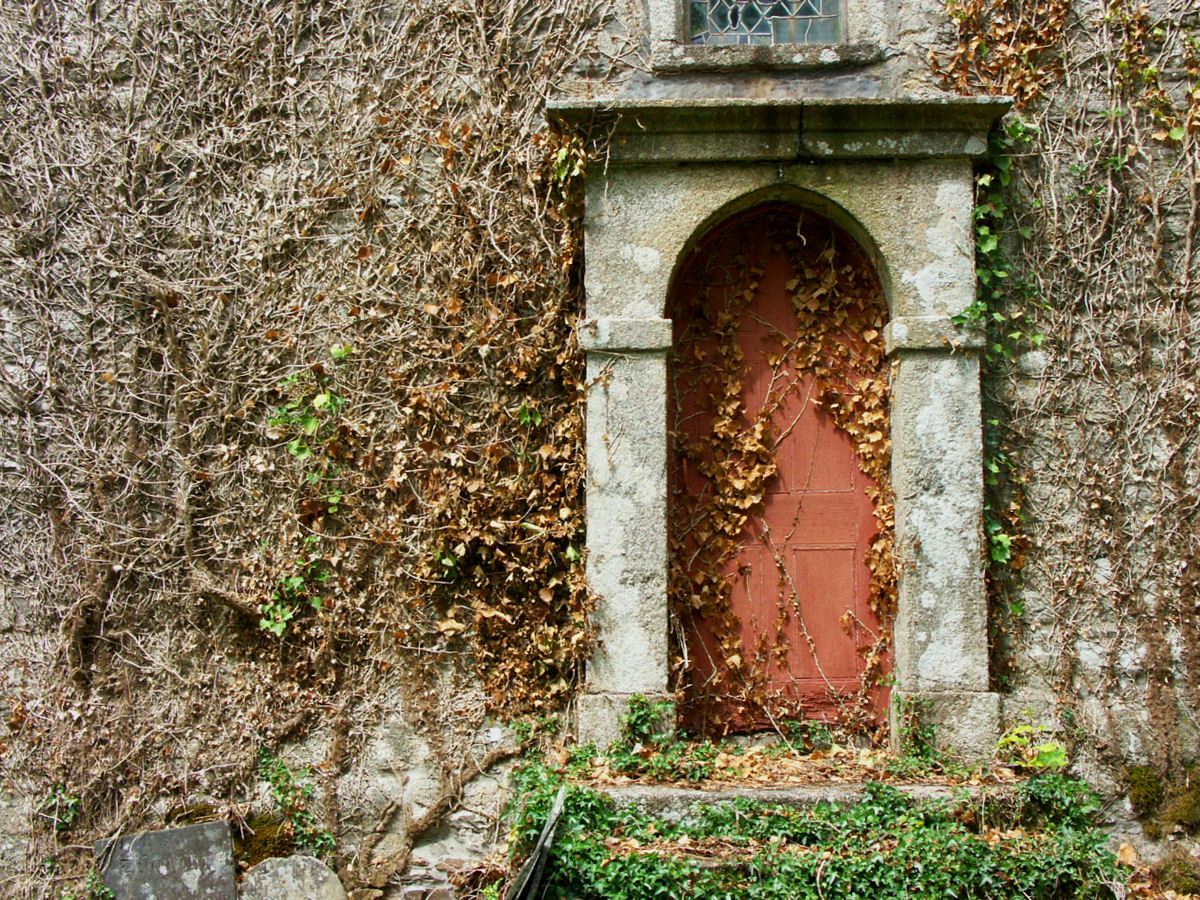
Parish Church: doorway

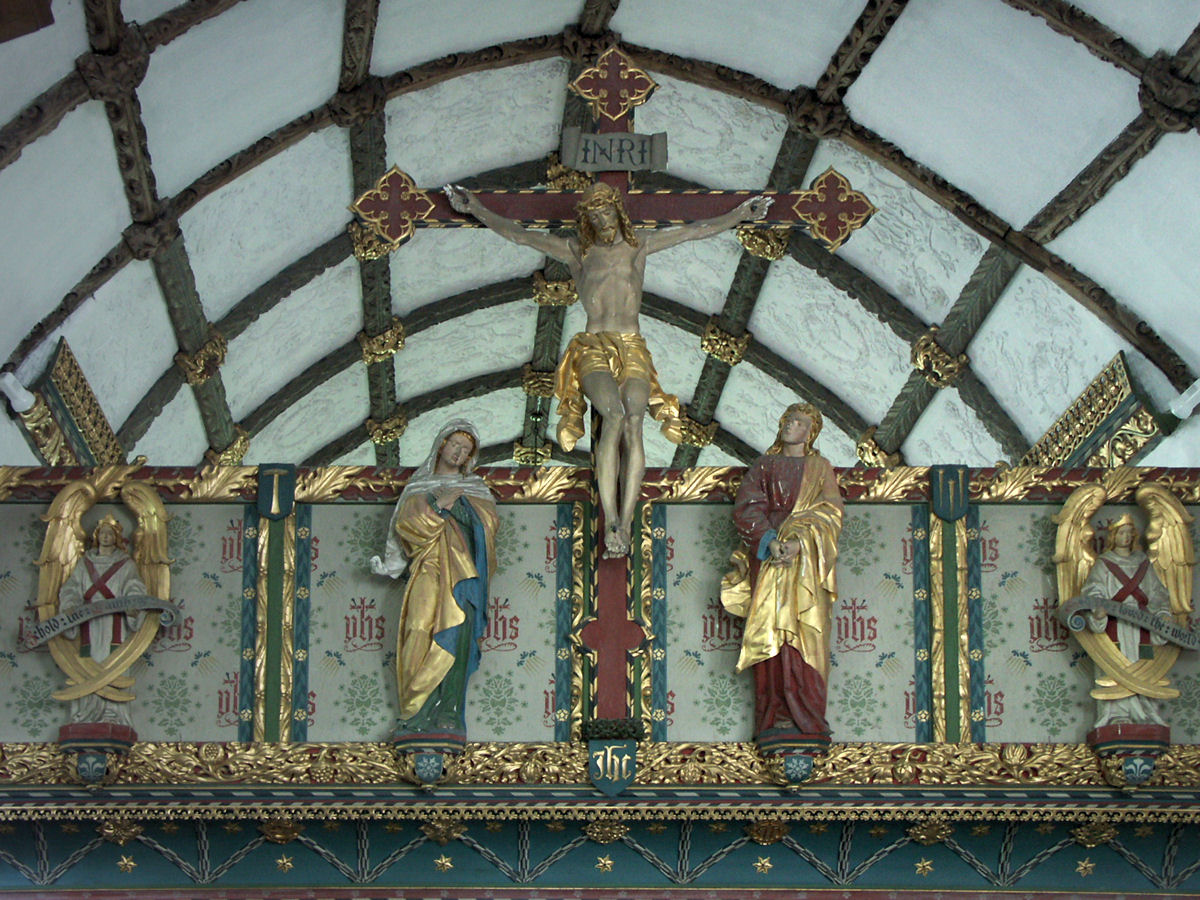
Rood screen (detail), part of Comper and Eden's restoration work

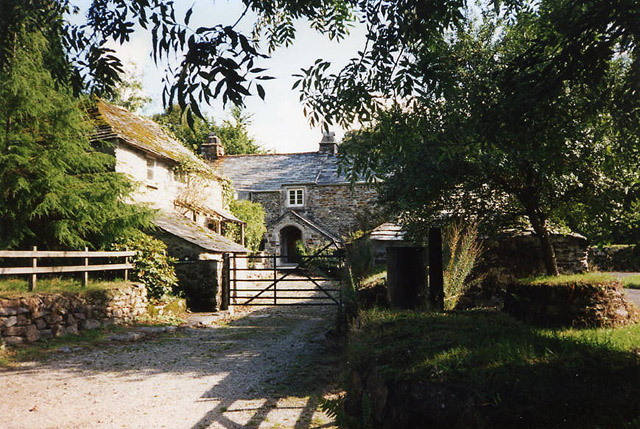
Trehudreth Mill
