= Tregullon =

Hamlet in Cornwall, England

Coordinates: 50.448089°N 4.729790°W

Tregullon (Cornish: Treguhelen) is a hamlet in the parish of Lanivet near Bodmin in Cornwall, England.

In 1884 it was noted as containing three farms and a mine. Tregullon mine was worked for iron, copper and tin. It operated first as "Tregullan Mine" to 1822, then from 1836 as "Tregollan Mine". In 1839 it merged with Tretoil Mine and was known as Consolidated Tretoil mine. Tregullan Quarry contains greenstone, axinite and calcflinta.

== See also ==
- List of farms in Cornwall
