= Newton, Cornwall =

Hamlet in Cornwall, England

Coordinates: 50.440°N 4.684°W

Newton
- Location within Cornwall
- OS grid reference: SX095635
- Civil parish: Lanhydrock
- Unitary authority: Cornwall
- Ceremonial county: Cornwall
- Region: South West
- Country: England
- Sovereign state: United Kingdom

Newton is a hamlet in the parish of Lanhydrock, Cornwall, England.
