= John Deviock =

John Deviock or Devyok (born c. 1420) was a Cornish gentleman and pirate from Ethy in the parish of St Winnow in Cornwall. In 1473 he was issued a Commission of array for the lieges of Cornwall to capture St Michael's Mount, which had been taken by the John de Vere, 13th Earl of Oxford and William Beaumont, 2nd Viscount Beaumont during a siege of twenty-three weeks against 6,000 of Edward IV's troops.

== Accused of piracy ==
In 1472, he was accused with piracy along with others. The following account is found in the Calendars of the Patent Rolls from the reign of Edward I.

Richard Joce to enquire into the complaint of Martin Perys, master of a ship called 'Le Katerine' of Castro in Spain, and Peter Sauns, merchant and owner of the goods and merchandise in the said ship, that when the ship was sailing at sea laden with 82 tuns and one pipe of white wine of Rochelle and other goods and merchandise to the value of 536/. certain pirates in a ship called le Barbara of Fowey, co. Cornwall, of which John Devyok, William Hurde, Thomas Ravyn, Nicholas Barbour and William Da we were owners and victuallers and John Barkeley master, came upon them and despoiled them of the ship, wines, goods and merchandise, contrary to the form of the truces between the king and his kinsman the king of Spain, and to cause restitution to be made."

== Commission for St Michael's Mount ==
On October 27, 1473, Commission to John Arundell, knight, John Colshyll, knight, Robert Willoughby, knight, John Crocker, knight, John Fortescue, Henry Bodrugan, John Sturgeon, Thomas Whalisburgh, John Trenowith, Thomas Trefrye, John Arundell, John Tremayne, John Carmynowe Richard Eggecombe, John Devyok, Oliver Wyse, Edward Assheton, John Pentyre, John Moyle, William TreTenoar, John Penpons, John Wydeslade the younger and William Horde to array the king's lieges of the county of Cornwall, and of other counties adjacent if necessary, to conquer John, late earl of Oxford, and other rebels who have entered St. Michael's Mount, Co. Cornwall, and to bring back the mount into the king's hands and provide for its safe-custody and defence.

== Family and issue ==
He was the son of John Devyok (d. 1474) and Elizabeth, daughter of John Luccombe of Bodmin. He was married firsly to Isabell (maiden name not known)

- Jane Devioke who married Edmund Courtenay

He was married secondly to Joan Kellaway

- Edmund Devioke who married Margaret Asshe

== See also ==
- Sir John Arundell of Trerice
