= Withiel =

Civil parish in Cornwall, England

Coordinates: 50.454°N 4.826°W

Withiel: Cornish: Egloswydhyel
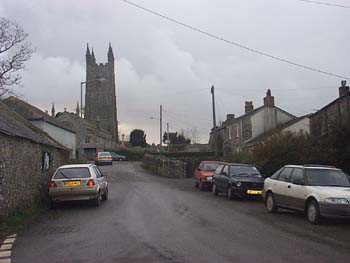
- Withiel

- Location within Cornwall
- Population: 331 (United Kingdom Census 2011)
- OS grid reference: SW995654
- Civil parish: Withiel
- Unitary authority: Cornwall
- Ceremonial county: Cornwall
- Region: South West
- Country: England
- Sovereign state: United Kingdom
- Post town: BODMIN
- Postcode district: PL30
- Dialling code: 01208
- Police: Devon and Cornwall
- Fire: Cornwall
- Ambulance: South Western
- UK Parliament: North Cornwall

Withiel (Cornish: Egloswydhyel) is a civil parish and village in mid Cornwall, England, United Kingdom. The parish of Withiel is between the parishes of St Breock, Lanivet, Roche and St Wenn. The name Withiel comes from the Cornish word gwydhyel, meaning "wooded place". The parish contains the hamlets of Withielgoose, Retire and Tregawne; the parish had a total population of about 300 in 1824.

At Ruthernbridge is an early 15th-century bridge with two pointed arches over the Ruthern. The hamlet here was until 1933 a halt on the Bodmin to Wadebridge railway line. The River Ruthern rises near Victoria in the parish of Roche and flows northwards through the parish of Withiel; it flows into the River Camel one kilometre above Brocton.

Notable people from the parish include Sir Bevil Grenville, a Royalist soldier in the English Civil War.

== Local government ==
Withiel Parish Council is the lowest level of government in the parish, its powers are limited, most functions are administered by Cornwall Council or by central government. The parish council is made up of 7 councilors and the clerk. As of 2017 these were: Anna Hoyle, David Cubitt, Guy Nott Bower, Janet Shearer, Patrick Malone, Simon Coy, Eric Harper and the clerk Robin Turner. They meet at the village hall.

== Church history ==
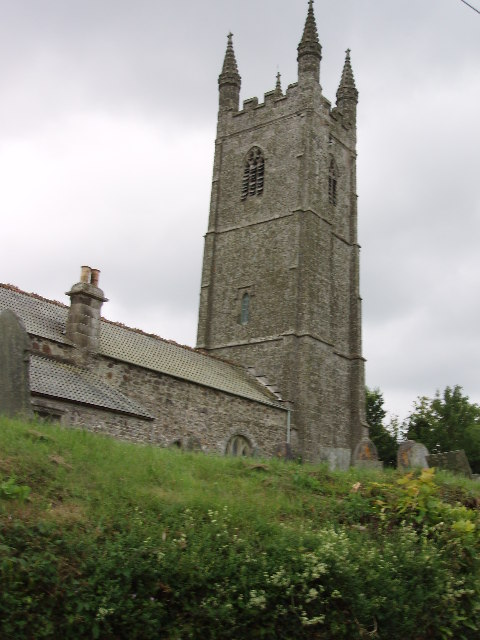
St Clement's Church

The parish church, the church of St Clement, dates back to the 13th century, and was enlarged in the 15th and 16th centuries with the addition of a tower and aisles. The dedication to St Clement is recorded from 1478, and the saint is represented on the font of that date. The church and manor of Withiel belonged to Bodmin Priory until the Dissolution in 1538. Thomas Vivian, Prior of Bodmin, served as rector from 1523 to 1533; his arms appear in the east window of the south aisle.

Two Cornish crosses and a cross base survive in the parish. One stands at a road junction about a mile south of the village, and another is in the rectory garden, having been moved there in about 1860. The former cross is called Inches Cross; it is thought that most of the cross shaft is buried in the ground.

The rectory was held by members of the Vyvyan family, including the Rev. Sir Vyell Donnithorne Vyvyan, 9th Baronet, and his father, who served for 50 years.

== Cornish wrestling ==
There were Cornish wrestling tournaments, for prizes, have been held in the Rectory grounds at Withiel.
