= Cooksland, Cornwall =

Coordinates: 50.4750°N 4.703°W

Cooksland: Cornish: Tircock
- Location within Cornwall
- OS grid reference: SX083674
- Civil parish: Bodmin
- Unitary authority: Cornwall
- Ceremonial county: Cornwall
- Region: South West
- Country: England
- Sovereign state: United Kingdom
- Post town: Bodmin
- Postcode district: PL30
- Police: Devon and Cornwall
- Fire: Cornwall
- Ambulance: South Western

Cooksland (Cornish: Tircock, meaning the Cock family's land) is part of Bodmin in Cornwall, England, UK.
