= Millpool =

Hamlet in Cornwall, England

Coordinates: 50.503°N 4.654°W

Millpool: Cornish: Kreunmelin
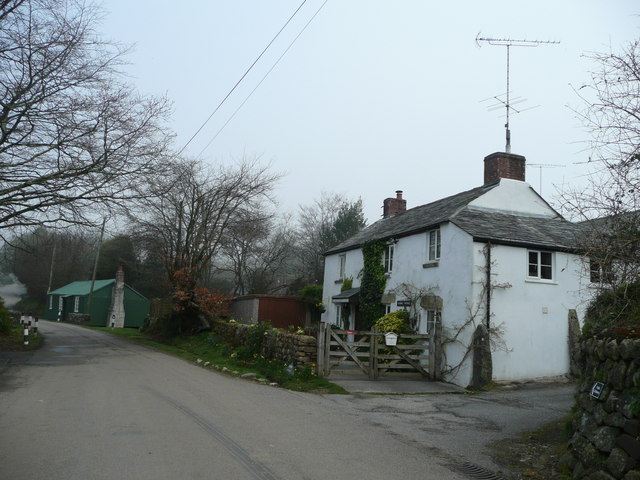
- A cottage at Millpool

- Location within Cornwall
- OS grid reference: SX119704
- Civil parish: Cardinham
- Unitary authority: Cornwall
- Ceremonial county: Cornwall
- Region: South West
- Country: England
- Sovereign state: United Kingdom
- UK Parliament: North Cornwall

Millpool (Cornish: Kreunmelin) is a hamlet in the parish of Cardinham in north Cornwall, England, lying about one mile north of Cardinham village. The A30 trunk road towards Bodmin runs about half a mile north-west of the hamlet.

There is another Millpool hamlet in west Cornwall, mostly in Breage parish, but having some properties in St Hilary and Germoe parishes.
