= St Lawrence, Cornwall =

Coordinates: 50.4633°N 4.751935°W

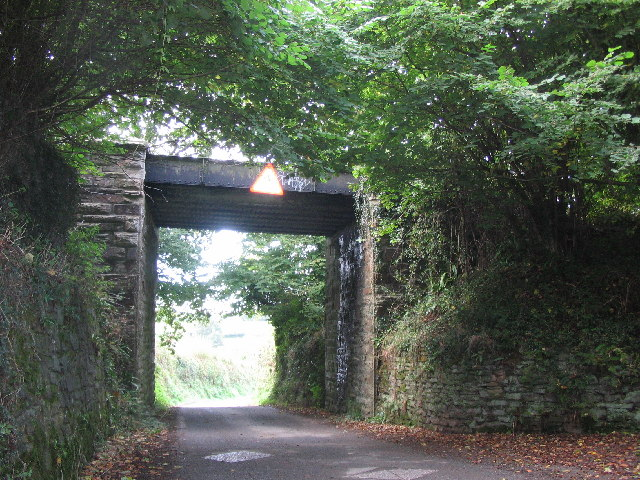
Girder bridge carrying the Bodmin & Wenford Railway over a minor road at St Lawrence

St Lawrence is a hamlet southwest of Bodmin, Cornwall, England, United Kingdom. From the Middle Ages until 1805 St Lawrence was the site of a lazar house (an institution for lepers). In 1805 its revenues were transferred to the Truro Infirmary.
