= Trebyan =

Hamlet in Cornwall, England

Coordinates: 50°26′08″N 4°42′21″W

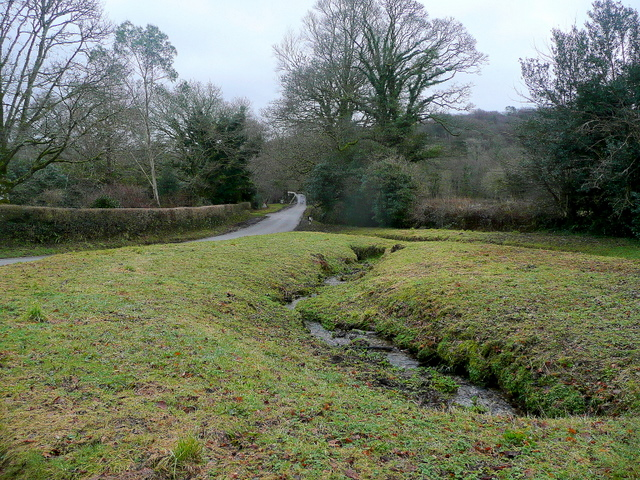
Near Trebyan

Trebyan is a hamlet in Cornwall, England, United Kingdom. It is half a mile west of Lanhydrock.
