= Pendrift =

Hamlet in Cornwall, England

Coordinates: 50.537°N 4.682°W

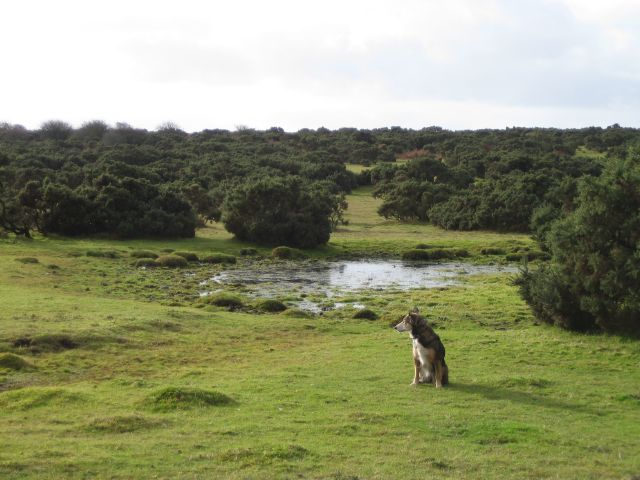
Pendrift Downs

Pendrift is a hamlet north of Blisland in Cornwall, England.
