= Lanivet =

Village in Cornwall, England

Coordinates: 50.445°N 4.763°W

Lanivet: Cornish: Lanneves
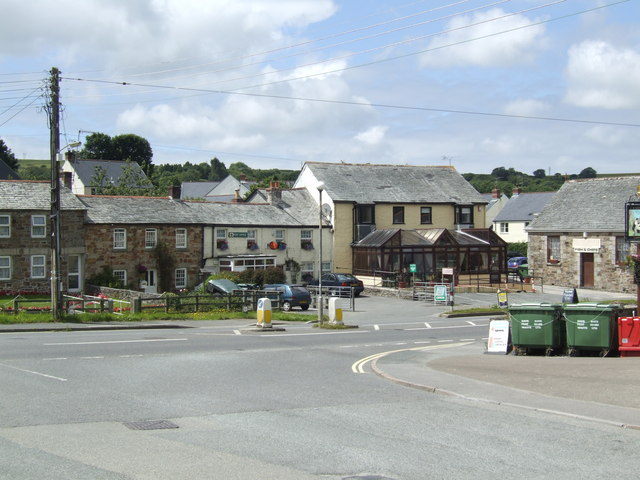
- Lanivet village

- Location within Cornwall
- Population: 1,959 (Civil Parish, 2011)
- OS grid reference: SX039642
- Civil parish: Lanivet
- Unitary authority: Cornwall
- Ceremonial county: Cornwall
- Region: South West
- Country: England
- Sovereign state: United Kingdom
- Post town: BODMIN
- Postcode district: PL30
- Dialling code: 01208
- Police: Devon and Cornwall
- Fire: Cornwall
- Ambulance: South Western
- UK Parliament: North Cornwall

Lanivet (Cornish: Lanneves) is a village and civil parish in Cornwall, England, United Kingdom. The village is situated approximately 2 1/2 miles (4.0 km) southwest of Bodmin, and before the Bodmin by-pass was built, the A30 road between London and Land's End passed through the village. The Saints' Way long-distance footpath passes Lanivet near its half-way point.

The parish includes the hamlets of Bodwannick, Bokiddick, Lamorick, St Ingunger, Trebell, Tregullon, Tremore, and Woodly. Part of St Lawrence is also in this parish. An electoral ward of the same name surrounds Bodmin. Its population at the 2011 census was 4,241.

== Notable buildings and antiquities ==
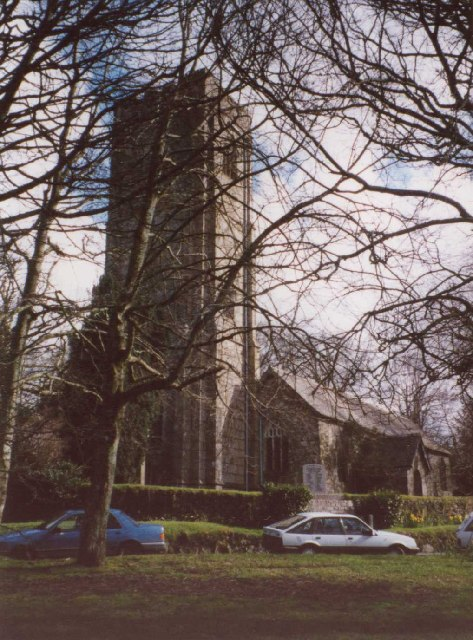
Lanivet Church

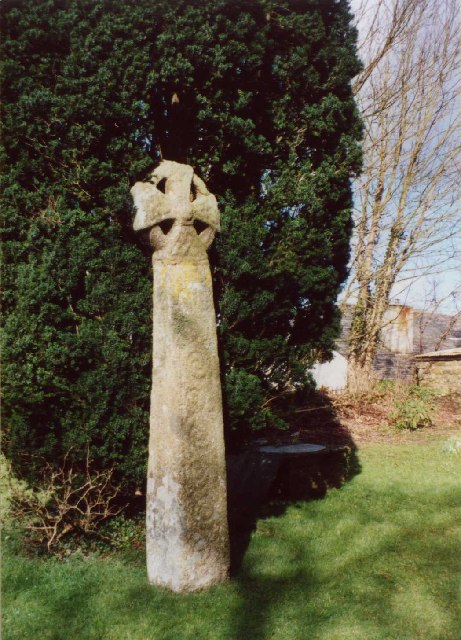
The cross in Lanivet churchyard

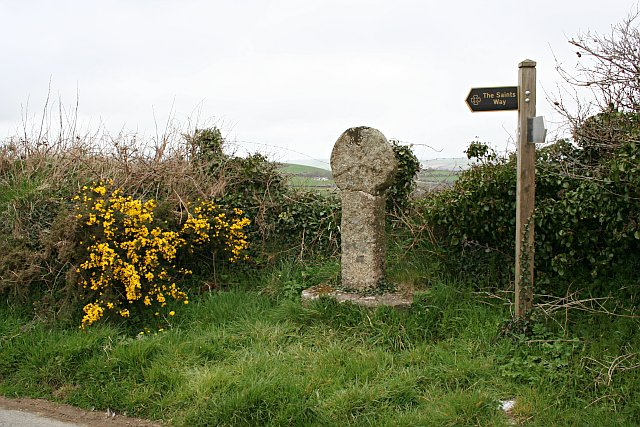
St Ingunger Cross

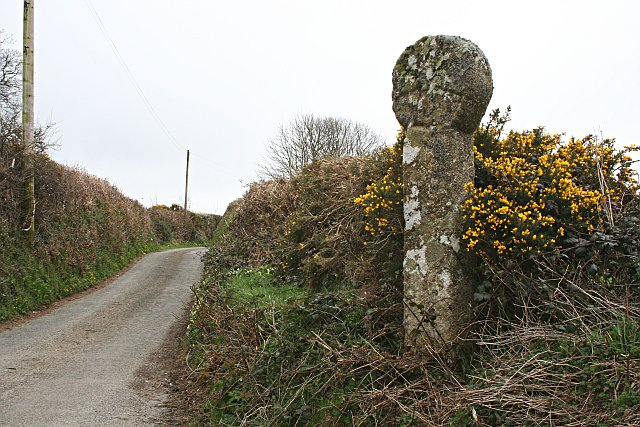
Lesquite Cross

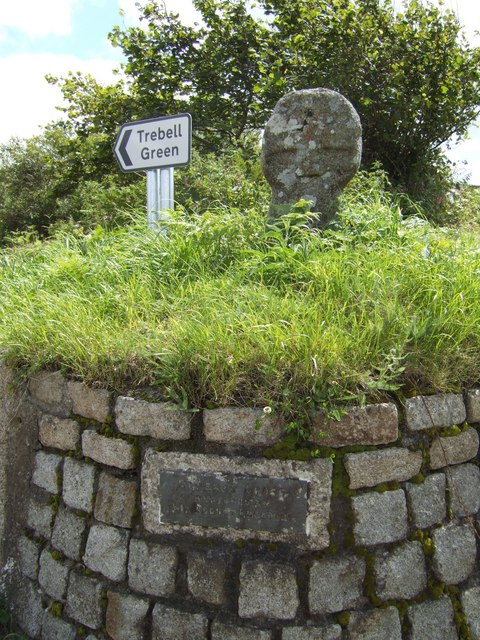
Reperry Cross

The church tower is built in the Perpendicular style and in 1878 had six bells. Renovations to the porch, nave and aisles were completed in that year along with the extension of the burial ground by enclosing an adjacent field. Within the church are monuments of the Courtenays of Tremere. In the churchyard are two ancient stone crosses and a rare example of a hogback grave dating from Viking times. A. G. Langdon (1896) also records the existence of four more stone crosses in the parish. Andrew Langdon (1994) records 13 crosses: two in the churchyard and Bodwannick Cross, Reperry Cross, St Ingunger Cross, Fenton Pits Cross, Lesquite Cross, Treliggan Cross, Laninval Cross, Tremore Cross, Woodley Cross, St Benet's Cross and Lamorick Cross. One of the crosses in the churchyard is said to be located at the exact centre of Cornwall. Langdon (1896) said of Reperry Cross that only the base remained but the cross was illustrated in the Gentleman's Magazine, vol. 75 (1805). According to Andrew Langdon (1994) the cross disappeared after its mention in 1805; J.T. Blight noted that only the base stone remained. Charles Henderson examined the St Ingunger Cross and decided it was the lost Reperry Cross. Meanwhile a replica had been made by Sir Robert Edgcumbe and placed on the base stone. In 1926, the original cross was put in its proper place and the replica was moved to a site near Reperry Manor. After damage to the hedge in 1997 had been repaired the cross was firmly placed on top of it.

About a quarter of a mile from the church are the remains of St Benet's, a monastery of the Benedictine order, said to have been subordinate to Monte Cassino, in Italy, or according to others, Clairvaux in Burgundy. It was founded as a lazar house in 1411, and during the 15th century a chapel with a tower and an adjacent longhouse were built. The building work was not complete by 1430; it is mentioned in a document of 1535. The tower and longhouse are mentioned by Charles Henderson as being still in existence; he refutes the idea of it as an abbey.

After the Reformation it became the home of the Courtenay family; the present house looks 19th-century with 15th-century windows built into the facade. St Benet was restored by, its then owner, Charles Eldon Sargeant in 1878, and is described by The Cornishman newspaper as "... a charming and picturesque place".

St Ingunger, in the parish, is said to have been the residence of the hermit, Saint Congar of Congresbury, in the early 6th century. Churches dedicated to him may also be found in Brittany and Cornwall.

Near to the village is located Lesquite Quoit, a ceremonial funerary monument built around 3500–2600 BC, one of only 20 portal dolmens surviving in the United Kingdom.

== Industry ==
In the adjacent hills, tin and iron extraction ceased in (or just before) 1878, and all that was left of the industry was one or two tin-stamps.

== Cornish wrestling ==
There were Cornish wrestling tournaments, for prizes, held in the meadow behind the Lanivet Inn and at the "Green" in Lanivet for centuries.

== Notable people ==
- John Courtenay of Tremere (1520/1521–1560) (now Tremore in the parish of Lanivet) was an MP and one of the family of Courtenay of Tremere.
- Emma Gifford (1840–1912) a writer and suffragist lived locally. Thomas Hardy (1840–1928) the novelist and poet, came to Lanivet in August 1872 to visit her home. He was introduced to her parents at Kirland House. He wrote a poem in the same year entitled Near Lanivet. They married in 1874.
- Loveday King (1935–2025), an English female professional darts player.
