= Ruthernbridge =

Coordinates: 50.4676°N 4.8016°W

Ruthernbridge: Cornish: Ponsrudhyn
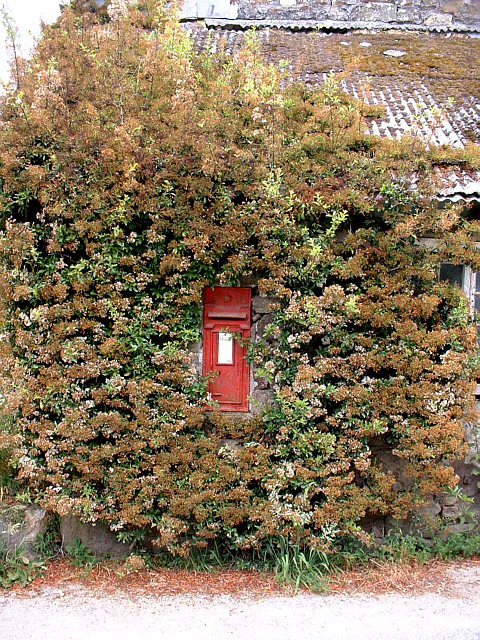
- The postbox at Ruthernbridge

- Location within Cornwall
- OS grid reference: SX 01293 66832
- Unitary authority: Cornwall
- Ceremonial county: Cornwall
- Region: South West
- Country: England
- Sovereign state: United Kingdom
- Post town: BODMIN
- Postcode district: PL30
- Dialling code: 01208
- Police: Devon and Cornwall
- Fire: Cornwall
- Ambulance: South Western
- UK Parliament: North Cornwall

Ruthernbridge (Cornish: Ponsrudhyn) is a village in the parish of Withiel in Cornwall, England, UK.

== History ==
The village is centred around an early 15th-century bridge with two pointed arches which carries the road over the River Ruthern.

The old wesleyan chapel, which was built in 1879, and the adjacent coach house, are both Grade II listed buildings.

== Railway ==
When the Bodmin and Wadebridge Railway (B&W) was built in 1834 it included a short branch of about 1.25 miles (2.01 km) from Grogley Junction to Ruthernbridge. Although not a requirement, the B&W placed stone markers every quarter of a mile, and a marker stone at each terminus showing the distance to the company's headquarters in Wadebridge, that at Ruthernbridge showing a distance of 4 miles 1 furlong 5 chains 10 yards. The main use of the line was to carry sand to local farms for use as a soil improver while ores of Lead, Iron and Copper from Mulberry Mine and Iron from Blackhay Mine were taken out. Although there was never an official passenger service on the branch and no platform or other facilities were provided, passengers were carried in the tool wagon. The original terminus had two sidings, one of which ran over wooden sand drops, and in 1914 a loop long enough to accommodate 8 wagons was installed 6 chains (120 m) up the line towards Grogley, the line being shortened to this location in 1926. The line ran along a lane for almost the whole length falling at a gentle incline of 1 in 158, this requiring any wagons left at Ruthernbridge to be chained to the rails to prevent them running away. In later years the only engines to work the branch were Beattie well tanks, which would work chimney-first to Ruthernbridge and then propel their train back to the junction as there were no run-round facilities as Grogley. The last train to Ruthernbridge ran on 29 November 1933 and the line officially closed on 30 December that year, less than 1 year short of its centenary.

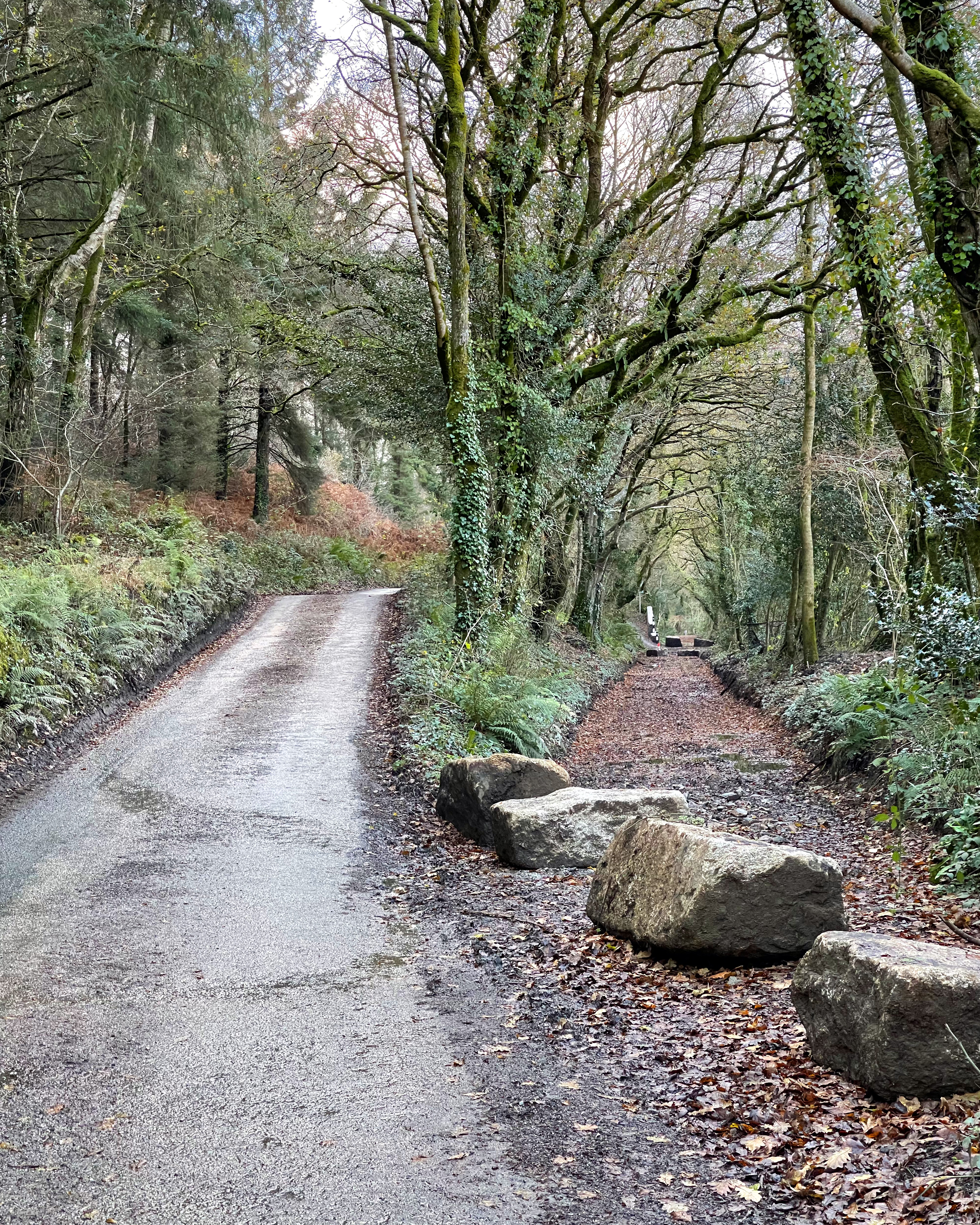
Trackbed of the branch line to Ruthernbridge in 2020

== Mining ==
The oldest mine working in the area is Mulberry Mine which dates back at least to Roman times, when it was one of only three mines in the county producing tin. Indeed, mining was, for a short period in the 19th century, a major industry locally, and seven different mines used the railhead at Ruthernbridge to convey their ores out for smelting.
