= Fletchersbridge =

Hamlet in Cornwall, England

Coordinates: 50.461°N 4.675°W

Fletchersbridge: Cornish: Ponsfletcher
- Hamlet
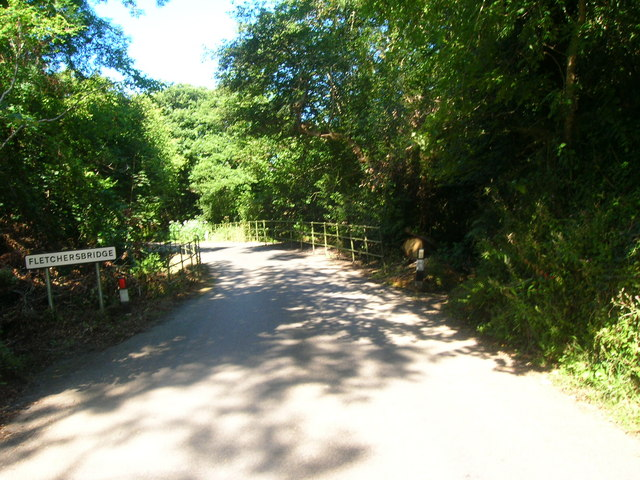

- Location within Cornwall
- Unitary authority: Cornwall
- Region: South West
- Country: England
- Sovereign state: United Kingdom
- Police: Devon and Cornwall
- Fire: Cornwall
- Ambulance: South Western

Fletchersbridge (Cornish: Ponsfletcher, meaning Fletcher's bridge) is a hamlet about 2 miles (3.2 km) east-south-east of Bodmin in Cornwall, England. in the valley of the River Fowey. Fletchersbridge lies at around 47 metres (154 ft) above sea level and is in the civil parish of Bodmin.
