= St Minver and St Endellion (electoral division) =

Electoral division of Cornwall in the UK

- Former ward Cornwall Council
- Boundary of St Minver and St Endellion in from 2013-2021.
- County: Cornwall

2013–2021
- Number of councillors: One
- Replaced by: Wadebridge East and St Minver; Wadebridge West and St Mabyn
- Created from: St Endellion

St Minver and St Endellion (Cornish: Sen Menvra hag Endelyen) was an electoral division of Cornwall in the United Kingdom which returned one member to sit on Cornwall Council between 2013 and 2021. It was abolished at the 2021 local elections, being succeeded by Wadebridge East and St Minver and Wadebridge West and St Mabyn.

== Councillors ==
Election	Member	Party
2013	Andy Penny	Independent
2017	Carol Mould	Conservative
2021	Seat abolished	

== Extent ==
St Minver and St Endellion represented the villages of Pendoggett, Port Isaac, Polzeath, Trebetherick, Pityme, St Minver, Rock and Tredrizzick, and the hamlets of Trelights, St Endellion, Port Quin, New Polzeath, Splatt, Penmayne, Stoptide, Porthilly and Trevanger. The division covered 5,332 hectares in total.

== Election results ==
=== 2017 election ===
2017 election: St Minver and St Endellion
Party	Candidate	Votes	%	±%
Conservative	Carol Mould	692	55.1	▲15.1
Independent	Andy Penny	394	31.3	▼10.2
Liberal Democrats	John Leach	161	12.8	▼4.2
Majority		298	23.7	N/A
Rejected ballots		10	0.8	▼0.7
Turnout		1257	50.9	▲8.3
Conservative gain from Independent		Swing		

=== 2013 election ===
2013 election: St Minver and St Endellion
Party	Candidate	Votes	%	±%
Independent	Andy Penny	455	41.5	
Conservative	Brian Gisbourne	439	40.0	
Liberal Democrats	Ed Headley-Hughes	186	17.0	
Majority		16	1.5	
Rejected ballots		16	1.5	
Turnout		1096	42.6	
Independent win (new seat)				
