= Michael N. Harbour =

British actor (1945–2009)

- Born: Michael Ninian Harbour; 4 July 1945; Edinburgh, Midlothian, Scotland
- Died: 9 April 2009 (aged 63); Trebetherick, Cornwall, England
- Resting place: St Enodoc's Church, Trebetherick
- Education: Rose Bruford College
- Occupation: Actor
- Years active: 1969–2009
- Spouse: Lesley Sizer Grieve (m. 1968)
- Children: 2, including Kate Harbour

Michael Ninian Harbour (4 July 1945 – 9 April 2009) was a British actor.

== Biography ==
Michael Ninian Harbour was born in Edinburgh on 4 July 1945, a son of Harold Ernest, a veterinary surgeon, and Mary Phillipa (née McManus).

He was educated at Finchley Grammar School and St Columba's College, St Albans. He then attended the Rose Bruford drama college in Sidcup.

Harbour joined the BBC Drama Repertory Company, and then became a presenter of a BBC children's education programme, Finding Out in the early 1970s. His stage debut came in April 1975 when he played Frid in Wheeler and Sondheim’s A Little Night Music, alongside stars such as Jean Simmons, Hermione Gingold and Joss Ackland. In 1998, he played the Mysterious Man/Cinderella's Father in Into the Woods at the Donmar Warehouse. He also played Firmin in the West End production of The Phantom of the Opera.

His television career prospered with appearances in many major series such as Budgie, Casualty, Heartbeat, Midsomer Murders and A Last Visitor for Mr Hugh Peter by Don Taylor, in which he co-starred with Peter Vaughan and Michael Pennington.

== Personal life ==
Harbour met his future wife, Lesley Sizer Grieve, at St Columba’s. They married in 1968, and had two daughters: Emma, in 1968, and Kate in 1971.

Emma married John Bowe in 1995. She is an actress and writer, and a director of Bowe Harbour Productions Ltd. Kate is a voice actress.

Michael and his family lived for the last 20 years of his life on the Isle of Dogs. He was a keen gardener and spent much time at his late brother's house in Trebetherick in Cornwall, where he died on 9 April 2009, at the age of 63. He was buried at St Enodoc's Church, Trebetherick.

His wife Lesley died in 2020.

== Filmography ==
Year	Title	Role	Notes
1985	Wild Geese II	KGB Man	
1998	Vigo	Studio Manager	
1999	Sophie's World	George Berkeley	
2000	Shafted!	Sextronaut	
2000	Pandaemonium	Walsh	
2006	Splinter	Beard	
2003	Midsomer Murders	S7E4	
