= Black Tor Ferry =

Coordinates: 50.5384°N 4.9378°W

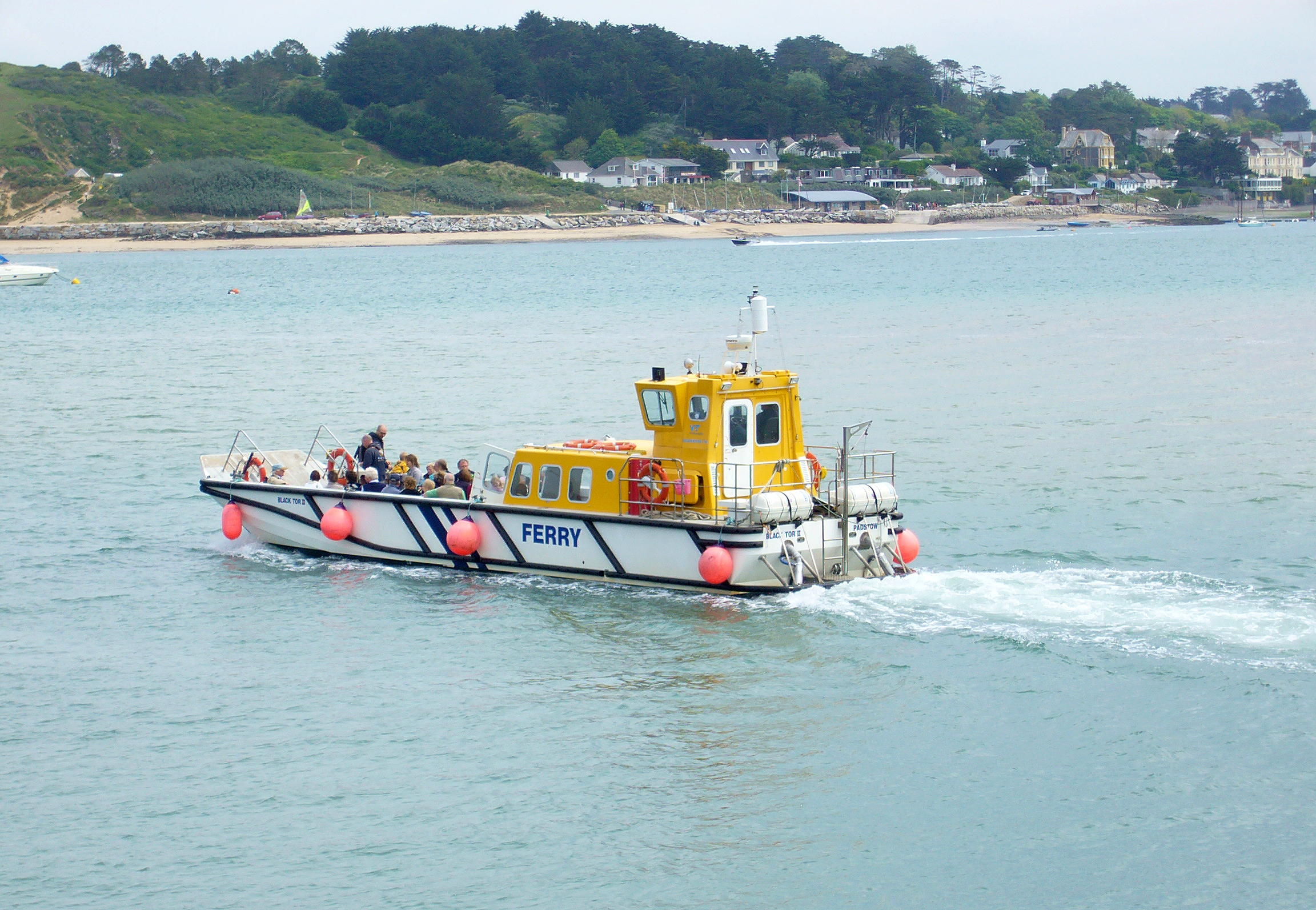
The Padstow to Rock ferry

The Black Tor Ferry, also known as the Padstow to Rock Ferry, is a passenger ferry which crosses the tidal River Camel in north Cornwall, United Kingdom. The ferry carries pedestrians and cyclists only (not vehicles).

== History ==
There has been a ferry at Black Rock Passage since 1337, the right originally belonging to the Duchy manor of Penmayne. Today the ferry operates on demand, daily in the summer and Monday to Saturday in the winter, the service being operated by Padstow Harbour Commissioners.

In the 1920s the ferry operated from Padstow harbour when the tide was up, and from the "Ferry Steps" which were accessed from a path leading down to a sandy foreshore from near the War Memorial when there was insufficient water to use the harbour. The fare at that time was 2s.

== Route ==
The ferry connects the town of Padstow on the west bank of the river to the village of Rock on the east bank. The route of the 630-mile (1,010 km) long South West Coast Path utilises the ferry.
