= Brea Hill =

Hill in Cornwall, England

Coordinates: 50.55719°N 4.92606°W

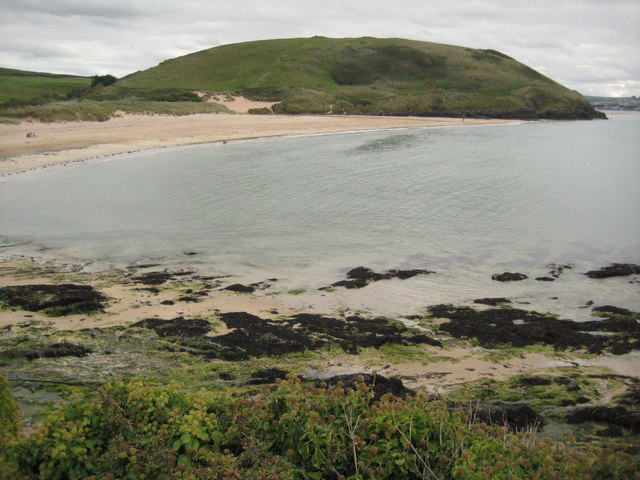
Looking south across Daymer Bay to Brea Hill

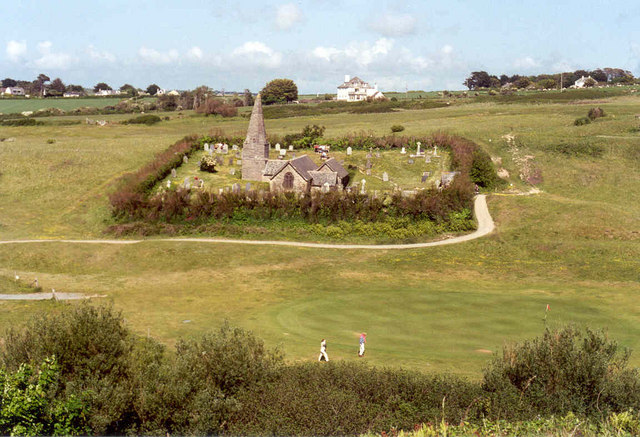
Looking east from Brea Hill across the golf course to St Enodoc's church

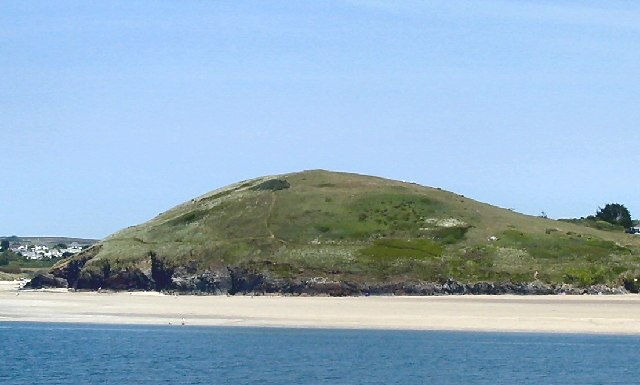
Looking east to Brea Hill from the River Camel

Brea Hill (Cornish: Bre, meaning hill), pronounced "Bray Hill" is a round hill beside the River Camel estuary in north Cornwall, England, United Kingdom The hill is 62 metres (203 ft) high and there are Bronze Age tumuli (burial mounds) at the summit. The underlying geology in this area of Cornwall is Devonian slates.

Brea Hill is situated at the south end of Daymer Bay between the settlements of Trebetherick and Rock in the civil parish of St Minver Lowlands. approximately five miles northwest of Wadebridge

On the west side, Brea Hill rises straight from the foreshore; on the north and south it rises from low sand dunes. To the east, the dunes give way to a golf course and grassland with St Enodoc's Church (where the poet Sir John Betjeman is buried) just below the hill. Brea Hill is within the Rock Dunes SSSI (Site of Special Scientific Interest). The reason that Brea Hill is such a positive feature in the landscape is that the centre of the hill, west to east, is a dolerite dyke, well-seen from the beach on the west and in the quarry on the east slope and in both exposures soft-sediment deformation is seen implying the intrusion followed shortly after deposition of the material which later became slate during the Variscan Orogeny. The dyke is shown on the British Geological Survey map Sheets 335 and 336, and memoir, for the Geology around Trevose Head and Camelford.

The South West Coast Path follows the west flank of the hill with an alternative route passing to the east. Brea Hill is grassed and treeless (except for a small wooded area low on the south flank) with rough footpaths leading to the summit and burial mounds.

== Literary associations ==
Brea Hill features in the John Betjeman poem 'Back from Australia', where Betjeman uses the alternative spelling Bray Hill (Stepper is Stepper Point):

At home in Cornwall hurrying autumn skies

Leave Bray Hill barren, Stepper jutting bare,
And hold the moon above the sea-wet sand.
The very last of late September dies
In frosty silence and the hills declare

How vast the sky is, looked at from the land.
