= Polzeath =

Village in Cornwall, England

Coordinates: 50.57356°N 4.91514°W

Polzeath: Cornish: Pollsygh
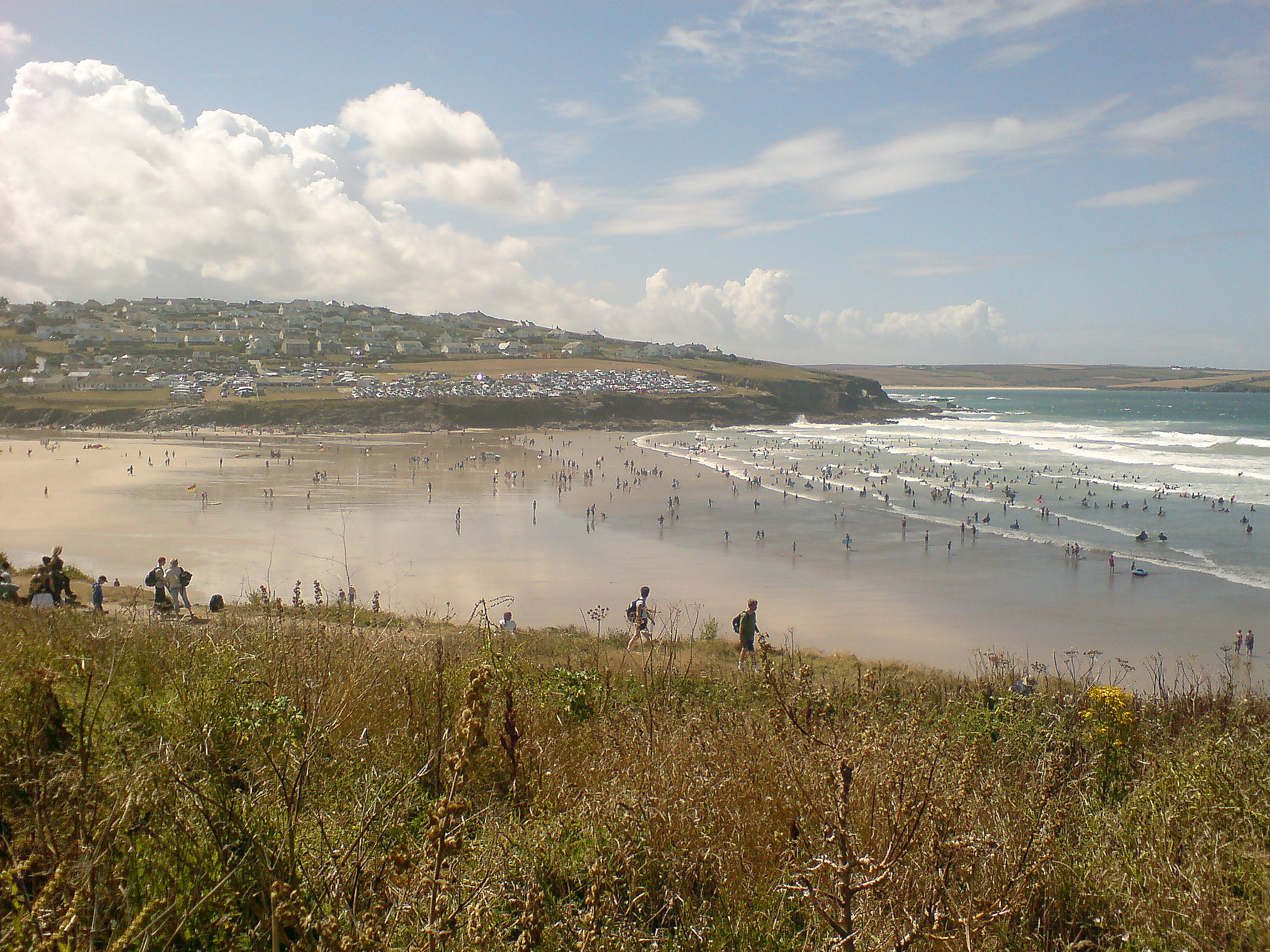
- The Beach at Polzeath

- Location within Cornwall
- Population: 1,449 (2001 Census, includes Trebetherick)
- OS grid reference: SW937788
- Unitary authority: Cornwall
- Ceremonial county: Cornwall
- Region: South West
- Country: England
- Sovereign state: United Kingdom
- Post town: POLZEATH
- Postcode district: PL27
- Dialling code: 01208
- Police: Devon and Cornwall
- Fire: Cornwall
- Ambulance: South Western
- UK Parliament: North Cornwall

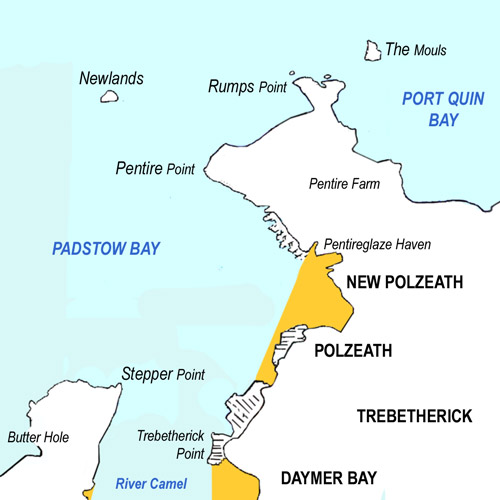
Sketch map showing Polzeath and the surrounding area

Polzeath (/pəlˈzɛθ/; Cornish: Pollsygh, lit. 'dry pool') is a small seaside resort village in the civil parish of St Minver in Cornwall, England, United Kingdom. It is approximately 6 miles (9.7 km) north west of Wadebridge on the Atlantic coast.

Polzeath has a sandy beach and is popular with holiday-makers and surfers. The beach is 1,500 feet (460 m) wide and extends 1,200 feet (370 m) from the seafront at low water; however, most of the sand is submerged at high water. At exceptionally high spring tides the sea floods the car park at the top of the beach.

Polzeath beach is patrolled by lifeguards during the summer and is described on the RNLI website as "a wide, flat beach with some shelter from winds, it sees good quality surf and is quite often extremely crowded".

Dolphins may sometimes be spotted in the bay and the coastline north of Polzeath is a good area for seeing many types of birds, particularly on migration but also including occasional puffins nesting on the offshore islands.

The main street runs along the seafront and has a parade of shops catering for holidaymakers and residents. There are pubs, cafés, restaurants, a caravan site and several camping sites in the immediate area. The road rises up steep hills at both ends of the seafront, towards the village of Trebetherick to the southwest and New Polzeath to the northeast.

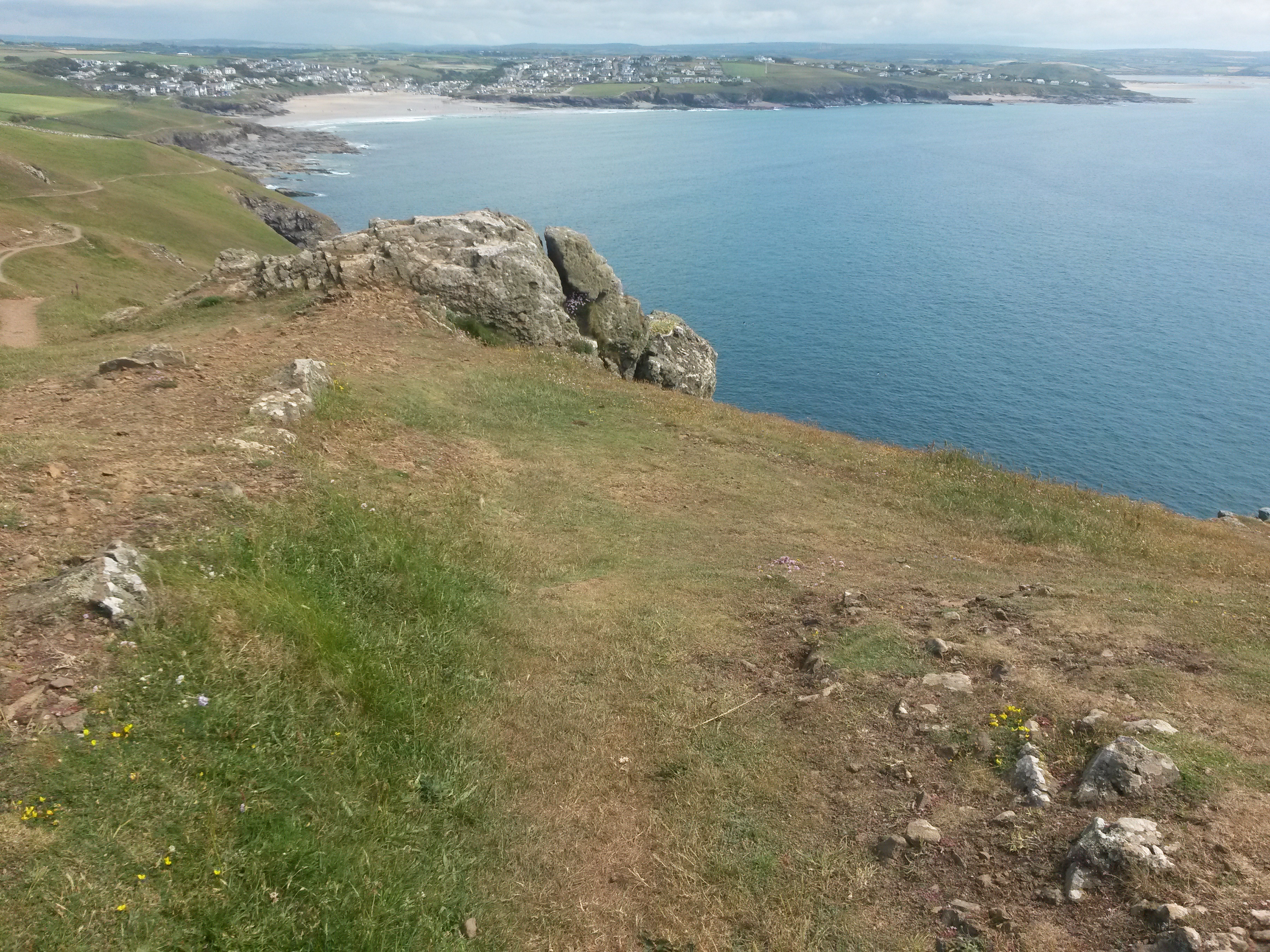
Looking back towards Polzeath from the South West Coast Path near Pentire Point.

The South West Coast Path runs from Daymer Bay in the South through Polzeath and up to Pentire Head in the North.

== Geography ==
The catchment surrounding Polzeath is approximately 40,900 hectares and is drained by several streams. The Polzeath Brook stream rises near St Minver 2 miles (3.2 km) to the east, and with several tributaries drains farmland before flowing through the middle of the Valley Caravan Park campsite and into the sea across Polzeath beach. The Trenant Stream is 900m long and also crosses the beach, this time entering from the north-east corner. There is also a small stream 1.5 kilometres long, which flows onto Pentireglaze beach (also known as Baby Bay) which is at the northern end of Polzeath beach but is separated from it at high tide by Slipper Point.

Shilla Mill at the edge of Polzeath, stands at the confluence of the streams. Built around 1590, it ceased working as a mill in 1885 and was converted into a house.

== History ==
In 1911, a Methodist chapel was built on the road towards Trebetherick at Chapel Corner. The original building was demolished in 1932, when the village street was widened and a new chapel was opened on 15 April 1933. Since 2006, the chapel has been called the Tubestation, and is an active church with services every Sunday. The rest of the week it is a surfers cafe.

Until 1934, the main street through the village crossed the stream by means of a ford and a footbridge was provided for pedestrians, although this was sometimes washed away by winter storms. For vehicles, the road surface stopped short of the ford, and cars splashed through the water on a sandy area, occasionally causing vehicles to become stuck in the sand. In 1934, the current road bridge was built, with a low wall separating the road from the sandy beach.

During World War II, the beach would, alongside other beaches in Cornwall, have barbed wire on it in preparation for a German naval invasion.

The winter storms of 2014 changed the topography of the beach, creating a sand bar up to 1m high, located at approximately the high tide mark, a feature that was not previously recorded. This was gradually washed away, so that by 2019, the beach had returned to the even slope visible in pictures up to 2014.

== Economy ==
Tourism developed in the 19th and 20th centuries to be the most significant part of the local economy. UK Prime Minister David Cameron and his wife holidayed there between 2010 and 2015.

The beach is a favourite destination for wealthy teenagers from independent schools who often engage in anti-social behaviour. In July 2022, police imposed a two-day 10pm curfew after drunken late-night beach parties of around 200 teenagers consistently got out of hand. Residents found broken prosecco bottles littering the beach, bonfires on the beach that were made from benches, fences and shed doors stolen from local houses and emergency life-saving equipment was vandalised. Local resident Andy Stewart, a former police officer, said the teenagers were often children of million-pound second home owners in the nearby village of Rock. He said, "They don't realise there is excessive drinking, cocaine, nitrous oxide, underage sex and big fires." Stewart has refused to identify the schools where many of the teenagers study, though he has been in contact with their senior staff. In 2023 a CCTV camera system was installed to watch the beach, along with rechargeable floodlights.

Bathing water quality is measured at Polzeath by the Environment Agency, with measurements being taken between May and September each year. The quality was rated as "excellent" in 2020, based on measurements taken between 2016 and 2019.

== Literary associations ==
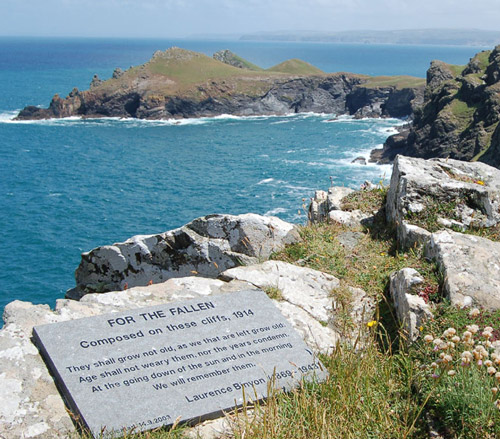
For The Fallen plaque on Pentire Head, with The Rumps in the distance

Polzeath was a favourite haunt of the poet laureate, Sir John Betjeman, and is celebrated in some of his verse. Another poet, Laurence Binyon, wrote the Remembrance Day ode For the Fallen in 1914 while sitting on Pentire Head, Polzeath (or "Polseath" as it was called), during World War I.

In the first of Enid Blyton's Famous Five novels, the eponymous children express disappointment that their holiday will not be spent at Polzeath as usual.

The cartoonist Posy Simmonds created a fictitious place in Cornwall called "Tresoddit". When the BBC made the short film Tresoddit for Easter in 1991, it was filmed in and around Polzeath.

The original 1975 BBC adaptation of Winston Graham's Poldark series of books filmed some scenes at Pentireglaze. In his book Poldark's Cornwall, Graham described this as "an area which could hardly have changed in a century".

== Notable people ==
- Edgar Anstey (1917–2009), Civil Service psychologist, lived in Polzeath from 1977 until his death.

== See also ==
- Trebetherick
- Wadebridge
- Pentire Point
- River Camel
