= Penmayne =

Hamlet in Cornwall, England

Coordinates: 50.548°N 4.901°W

Penmayne is a hamlet next to Splatt in the civil parish of St Minver Lowlands in north Cornwall, England, UK.

In the Middle Ages Penmayne (a sub-manor of Helston-in-Trigg) was one of the Antiqua maneria (ancient manors), the original 17 manors belonging to the Earldom of Cornwall.
