= Fleur Lombard =

British firefighter (1974–1996)

- Fleur Lombard receiving the Silver Axe Award in 1994
- Born: 27 May 1974; Watford, Hertfordshire, England
- Died: 4 February 1996 (aged 21); Staple Hill, Bristol, England
- Occupation: Firefighter
- Known for: First female firefighter to die on duty in peacetime Britain

Fleur Lombard QGM (27 May 1974 – 4 February 1996) was the first female firefighter to die on duty in peacetime Britain.

== Biography ==
Fleur Lombard was born in Watford, Hertfordshire, UK. The plaque at the site her ashes are interred records her parents as Roger and Jane Lombard and that she had a sister Rebecca. Her grandfather was Adrian Lombard, who was posthumously appointed a CBE for his services to export as Director of Engineering at Rolls-Royce, and who led the team who developed the RB211 jet engine. She died at the scene of the fire that destroyed a supermarket in Staple Hill, Bristol, UK. The fire was started deliberately by a security guard working in the supermarket; he was sentenced to seven years' imprisonment.

== Staple Hill supermarket fire and death ==
Fleur Lombard was one of only eight women among Avon's 700 firefighters. On graduating in 1994, Lombard received the Silver Axe Award, for most outstanding recruit in her training school. On 4 February 1996, when she was 21 years old, she was fighting a supermarket fire in Staple Hill, near Bristol, when she and her partner, Robert Seaman, were caught in a flashover. She was killed as a direct result of the intense heat and her body was found just a few yards from the exit. Lombard was the first female firefighter to die in peacetime service in Britain.

Posthumously, she was awarded the Queen's Gallantry Medal. Robert Seaman was awarded the George Medal for bravery for returning to the burning building when he realised his partner had not followed him out. Another firefighter, Pat Foley, who also went into the blazing supermarket to help, was awarded the Queen's Commendation for Bravery.

=== Martin Cody ===
The fire was deliberately started by security guard Martin Cody on his first day at work at the supermarket. Cody was said to live in a fantasy world and started the fire to relieve his boredom. He phoned a colleague to say the fire was "a good one", and was seen punching the air with glee before firefighters arrived on the scene. Cody, aged 21, was convicted at Exeter Crown Court of manslaughter and arson. The judge who sentenced him to seven-and-a-half years' imprisonment at the Royal Courts of Justice stated that he had escaped a life sentence for the manslaughter only because psychiatrists were unable to say he posed a continuing serious risk to the public. Lombard's parents criticised the jail sentence, saying psychiatric treatment would have been more appropriate.

== Legacy ==
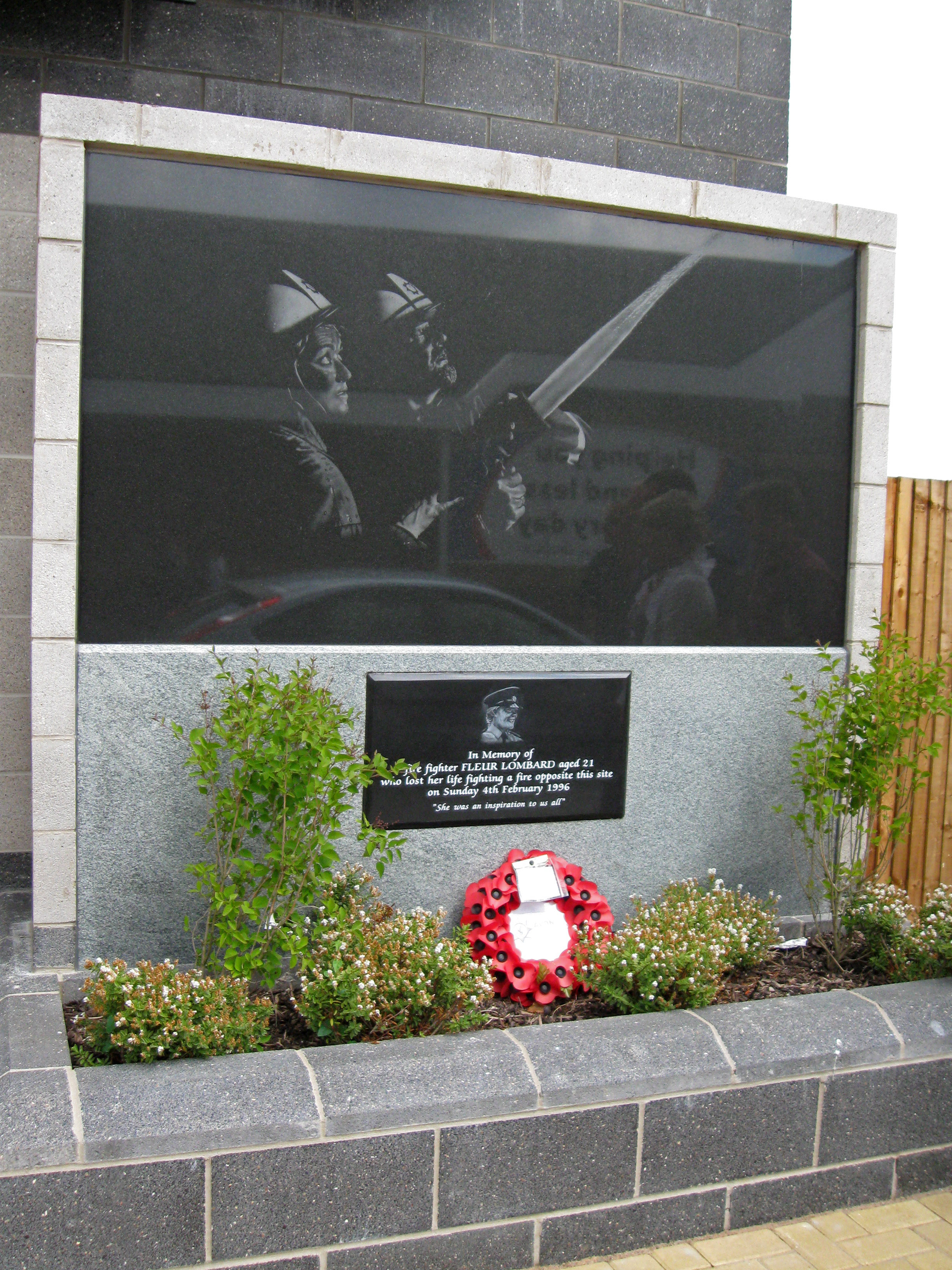
Memorial at Staple Hill

Lombard's funeral service was held on 14 February 1996, at Derby Cathedral. She was cremated and her ashes were later interred in the churchyard of St Enodoc's Church, Trebetherick, Cornwall. A trust fund and bursary were set up in her memory.

A memorial plaque stands close to where Lombard died. Her name is on the UK National Firefighters Memorial located near St. Paul's Cathedral, London.

In her memory, Avon Fire and Rescue Service have set up the Fleur Lombard Bursary Fund. This provides travel grants so that a junior UK firefighter may visit the fire service of another country.

On 15 May 2019, Great Western Railway named a Class 800 intercity express train (IET), No. 800023, in her honour.

On 9 November 2024, Lombard's family was announced as one of the first recipients of the Elizabeth Emblem.

== See also ==
- List of British firefighters killed in the line of duty
