= St Enodoc's Church, Trebetherick =

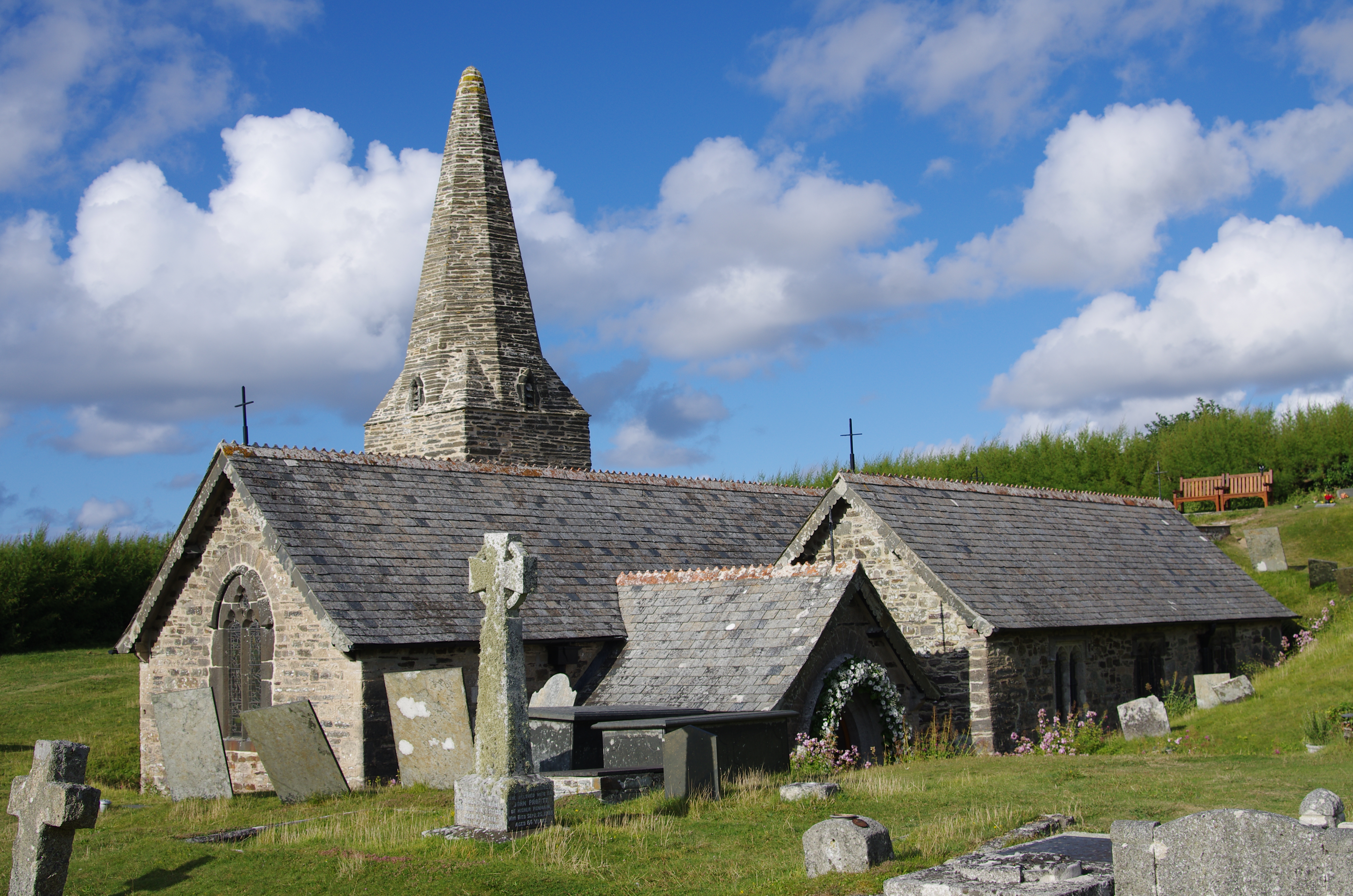

- Location within Cornwall
- 50.5581°N 4.9215°W
- Location: Trebetherick, Cornwall
- Country: England
- Denomination: Church of England

Architecture
- Architect: J. P. St Aubyn (minor restoration)
- Style: Early English
- Completed: 1864 (restored)

Specifications
- Materials: Stone rubble with slate roofs

Administration
- Diocese: Truro

Listed Building – Grade I
- Official name: Church of St Enodoc
- Designated: 6 June 1969
- Reference no.: 1211902

St. Enodoc Church, Trebetherick (Old Cornish: Gwenedek, St. Guenedoc) is a chapel in the parish of St Minver. It is located to the south of the village of Trebetherick, Cornwall, England, United Kingdom (grid reference SW931772). It is a Grade I listed building.

== Background ==
The church is situated in sand dunes east of Daymer Bay and Brea Hill on the River Camel estuary. Wind-driven sand has formed banks that are almost level with the roof on two sides. From the sixteenth century to the middle of the nineteenth century, the church was virtually buried by the dunes and was known locally as "Sinking Neddy" or "Sinkininny Church". To maintain the tithes required by the church, it had to host services at least once a year, so the vicar and parishioners descended into the sanctuary through a hole in the roof. By 1864 it was unearthed and the dunes were stabilized. The church is surrounded by the Church course of the St Enodoc Golf Club.

== History ==
The church is said to lie on the site of a cave where Enodoc lived as a hermit. The oldest fabric in the church dates from around the twelfth century. Additions were made in the thirteenth and fifteenth centuries. By the eighteenth century the church was partly submerged in sand. During the nineteenth century the sand was removed and the church was cleaned and restored under the direction of the vicar of St Minver, Rev. W. Hart Smith. The architectural restoration was carried out in 1863–64 by J. P. St Aubyn.

== Structure ==
The church is built in stone rubble with slate roofs. Its plan consists of a nave and chancel, a three-bay aisle to the south of the chancel, a north transept leading to the tower, which unusually is to the north of the church, and a south porch. The tower is in two stages and is surmounted by a low broach spire. On all four faces are small trefoil-headed belfry openings.

== Fittings and furniture ==
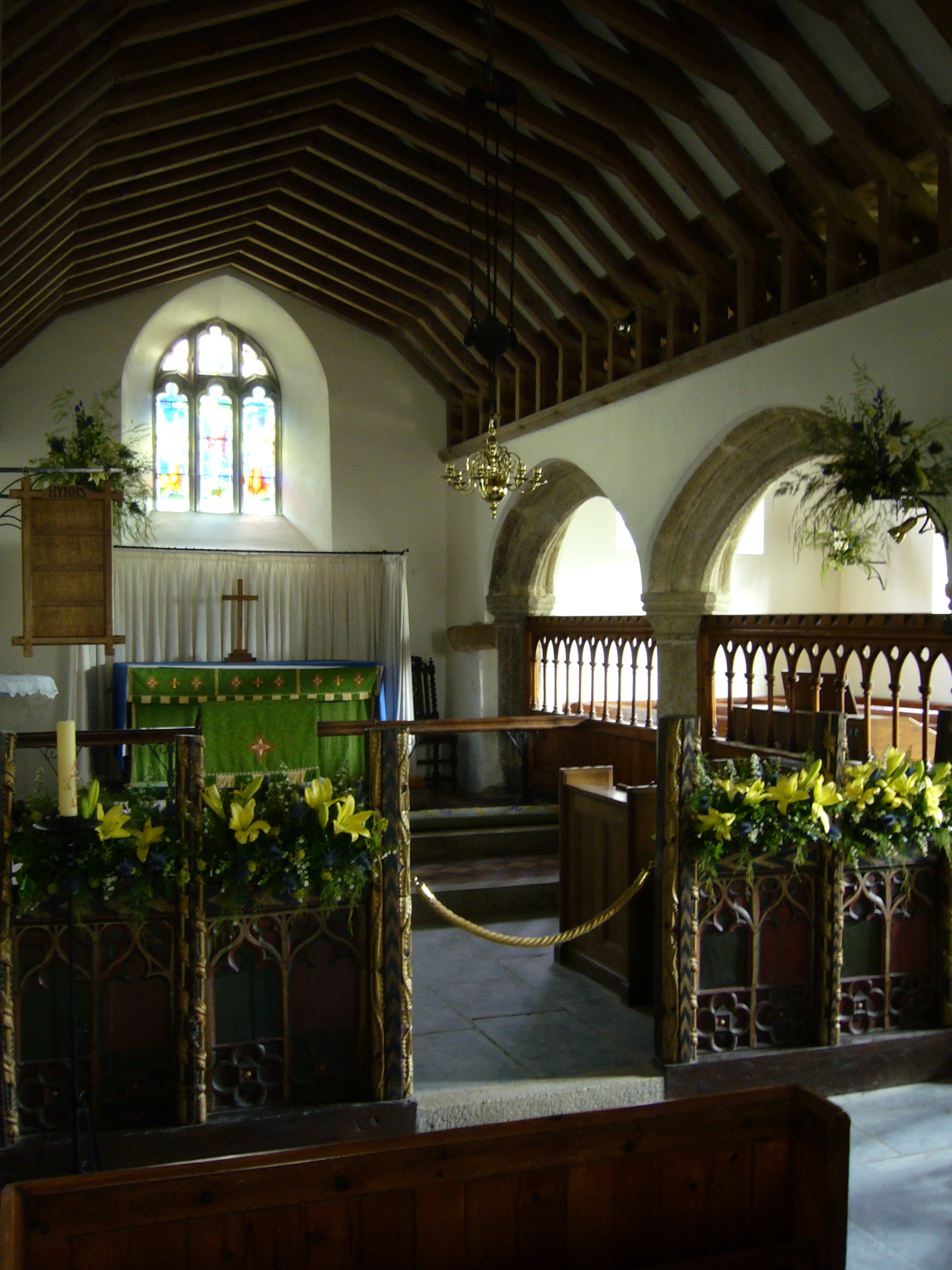
Church interior

The furnishings were largely replaced in 1863–64 although the base of a rood screen dating from around the fifteenth century has survived. The granite font dates from the twelfth century. It has a lead lined round bowl which stands on a shaft carved with cable moulding on a round base. A memorial stone to John Mably who died in 1687 is in the south porch. Inside the church on the south wall is a memorial to Ernest Edward Betjeman (1872–1934), the father of Sir John Betjeman. There is a memorial to the three crew lost on the brig Maria Asumpta, which was wrecked on The Rumps in 1995.

== External features ==
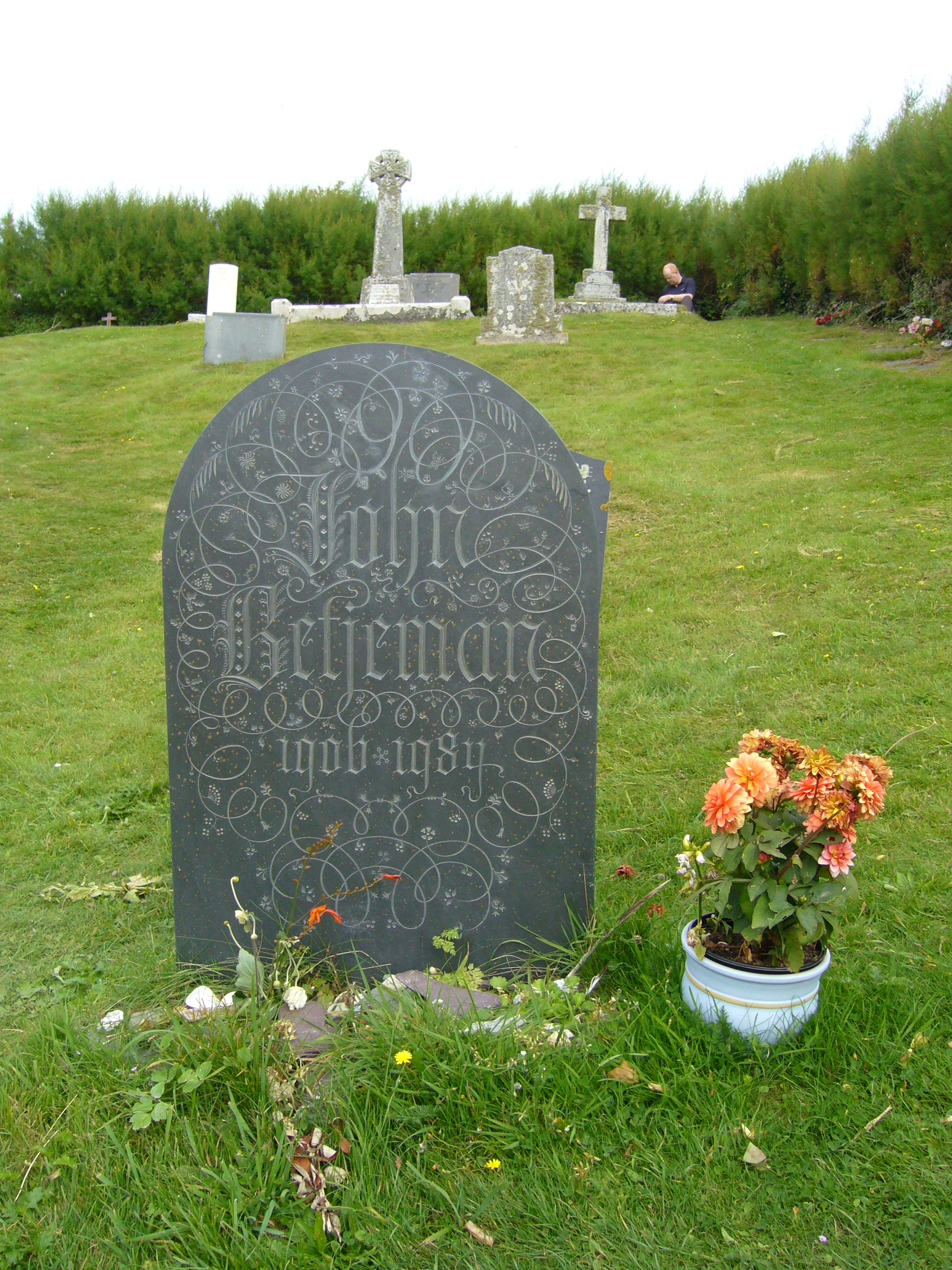
Sir John Betjeman's gravestone

In the churchyard are two headstones and three tomb chests which are listed Grade II. Also in the churchyard is the grave of the former poet laureate John Betjeman (1906-1984). Interred there also are the ashes of Fleur Lombard (1974-1996), the first female firefighter to die on duty in peacetime Britain.

About 0.6 miles (0.97 km) to the south of the church is Jesus Well. This is a holy well over which is a stone rubble wellhouse which was rebuilt probably in the nineteenth century and restored in the twentieth century. The wellhouse is a Grade II listed building. Also in the churchyard is a Cornish cross which consists of a head and upper part of the shaft. These were found built into the churchyard wall in 1863.

== Culture ==
John Betjeman referred to the church in his poem Sunday Afternoon Service at St. Enodoc. The church is also featured prominently in Justin Cartwright's novel The Promise of Happiness (2004), partly set in Trebetherick.

In the novel The Last Patriot by Brad Thor, the main character, Scot Harvath, owns a house called Bishop's Gate, which is described as a twin to St. Enodoch.
