= Tredrizzick =

Village in Cornwall, England

Coordinates: 50.555°N 4.888°W

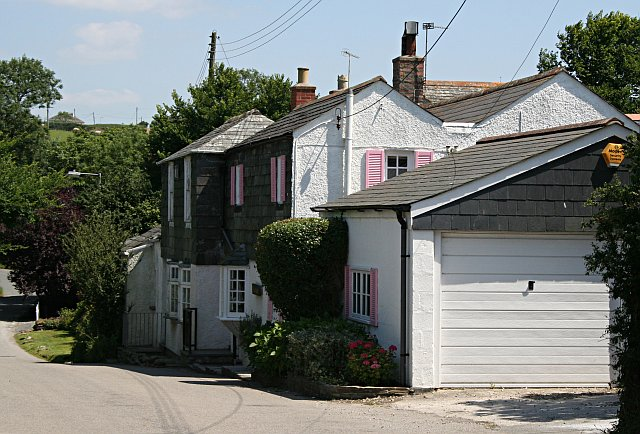
Houses near Tredrizzick Bridge

Tredrizzick (Cornish: Treredenek) is a small village in Cornwall, England, United Kingdom, at grid reference SW 955 769. It is on the road linking the villages of Rock and St Minver.
