= Chapel Amble =

Village in north Cornwall, England

Coordinates: 50.544°N 4.829°W

Chapel Amble: Cornish: Amaleglos
- Location within Cornwall
- Civil parish: St Kew
- Unitary authority: Cornwall
- Ceremonial county: Cornwall
- Region: South West
- Country: England
- Sovereign state: United Kingdom
- Post town: WADEBRIDGE
- Postcode district: PL27
- Dialling code: 01208
- Police: Devon and Cornwall
- Fire: Cornwall
- Ambulance: South Western
- UK Parliament: North Cornwall

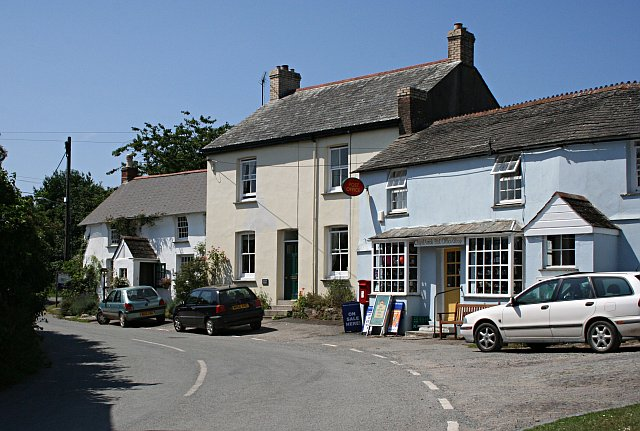
Houses in Chapel Amble

Chapel Amble (Cornish: Amaleglos, meaning church on the river Amble) is a village in the civil parish of St Kew, north Cornwall, England, United Kingdom. It is situated 2 miles (3.2 km) north of Wadebridge next to the River Amble, a tributary of the River Camel. The oldest part of the village lies on rising ground facing south-east across the river.

== History ==
Despite being a small village, Chapel Amble appeared in the national press in 2002 after the murder of a local farmer. The fact that a newspaper reporter was a local resident probably assisted in this receiving so much attention. The article dates the village back to at least 1373, although the earliest written mention of Chapel Amble is in the Domesday Book where 'Amal' was held by Thurstan from Robert, Count of Mortain.

The earliest record of the name "Amaleglos" is in 1284. The name "Amble" is derived from the Cornish "Amal", i.e. "edge" or "boundary" and is the name of a tributary of the Camel. As "eglos" is the Cornish for "church" there must already have been a chapel here; in 1383 a chapel of St Aldhelm was licensed.

Despite the indications of an earlier chapel, a Methodist society started in Chapel Amble in 1784 and 50 years later had 30 members. There were groups of two different streams of Methodism; Bible Christians and the United Methodist Free Church, and as a result there were two separate Methodist chapels in the village with a total capacity of 250. The chapels, which are both Grade II listed, closed between 1987 and 1991 and have since been converted for residential use. Apart from the old chapels, there are three other listed building in Chapel Amble. The oldest is an 18th-century house in the village itself, and slightly later are the old forge and a 19th-century barn located across the river from the village.

== River Amble ==
The River Amble was once navigable up to the village on high spring tides, with seaweed, sand and coal being taken up to the village and grain brought out again.

Access to the River Amble for vessels is not now possible after construction of the tidal barrage which prevents the tide entering the river in 1963. The area at the foot of the slope below the village was once known as "the beach" and was used for leisure activities such as cricket.

Despite the tidal barrage preventing salt water from being pushed up by the tide, this low-lying area regularly floods in winter and this plus the wet meadows around the River Amble near the village are good for birdwatching, with the location regularly appearing on lists of bird sightings published by the Cornwall Birdwatching and Preservation Society
