= Trevanger =

Hamlet in Cornwall, England

Trevanger is a hamlet west of St Minver, Cornwall, England, United Kingdom.
