= Porthilly =

Village in Cornwall, England

Coordinates: 50.54158°N 4.91312°W

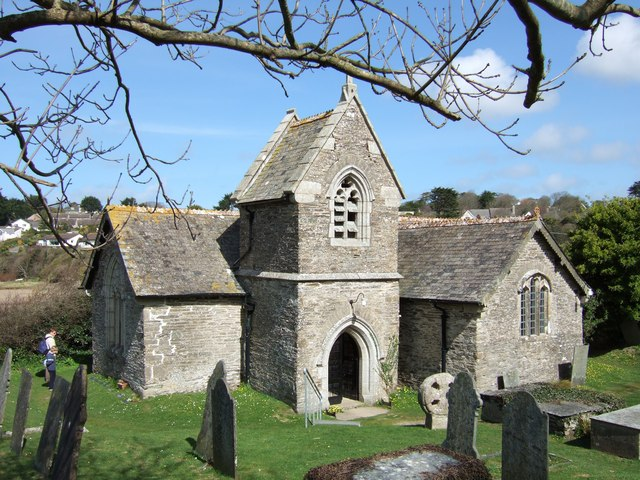
St Michael's church, Porthilly

Porthilly (Cornish: Porthhyli) is a small coastal settlement on the east side of the River Camel estuary in Cornwall, England, United Kingdom. It is situated immediately south of the larger village of Rock approximately four miles (6.5 km) northwest of Wadebridge.

The settlement is in the civil parish of St Minver Lowlands. It is on the south side of Porthilly Cove, an estuarine bay with a level intertidal beach.

St Michael's church, an ancient chapelry of St Minver parish, stands on the seawall above the cove. First mentioned in a deed dated 1299, the building has Norman features and was substantially restored in 1867. It has a chancel and nave, a south transept and a bell turret containing one bell.

In the churchyard to the south of the church is a medieval four holed cross. It is listed Grade II.

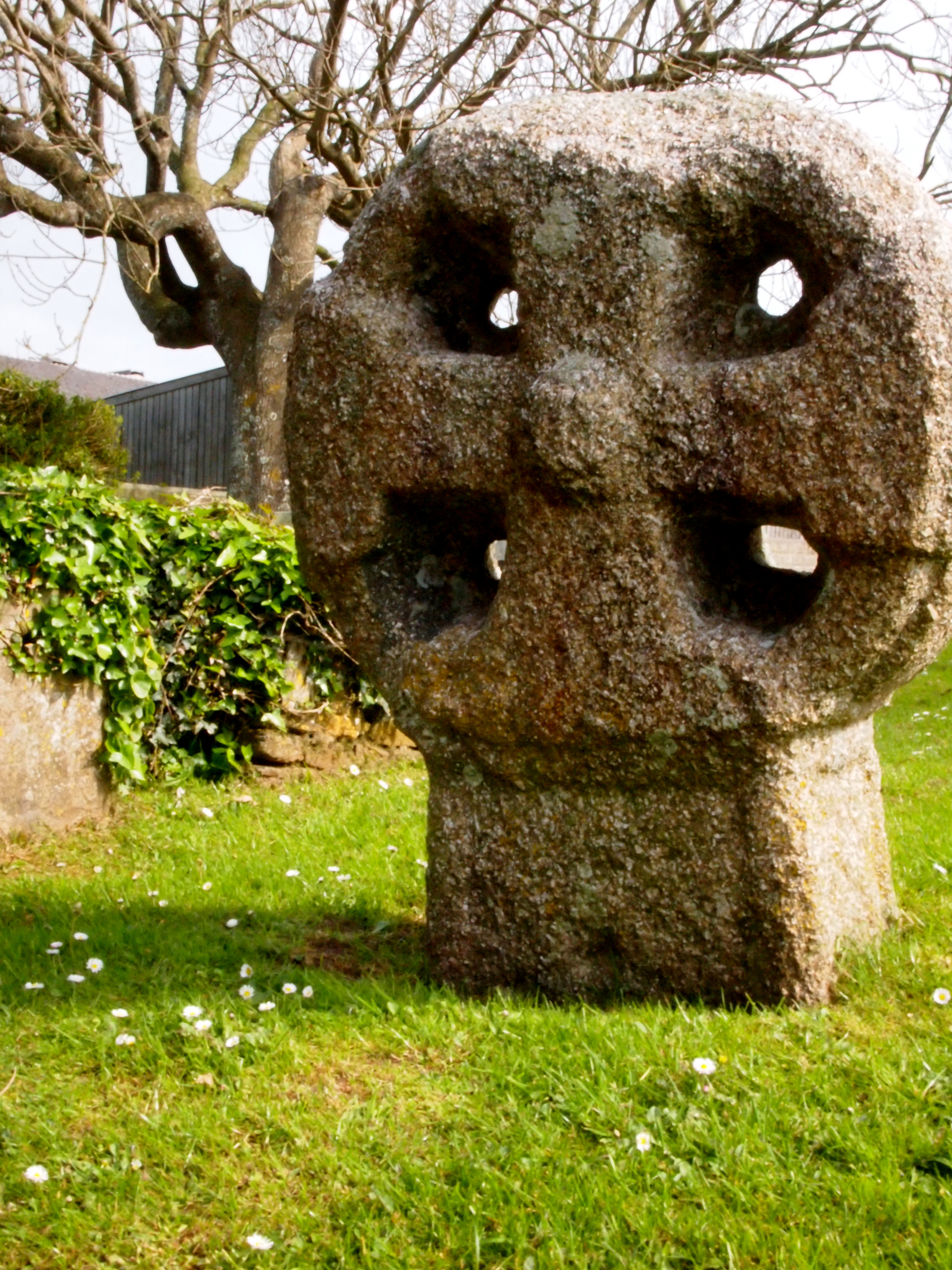
The Porthilly medieval cross in 2014.

== Cornish wrestling ==
Cornish wrestling tournaments, for prizes, have been held in Porthilly, including the Interceltic games in 1969.
