= Trebetherick =

Village in Cornwall, England

Coordinates: 50.5652°N 4.9192°W

Trebetherick: Cornish: Trebedrek
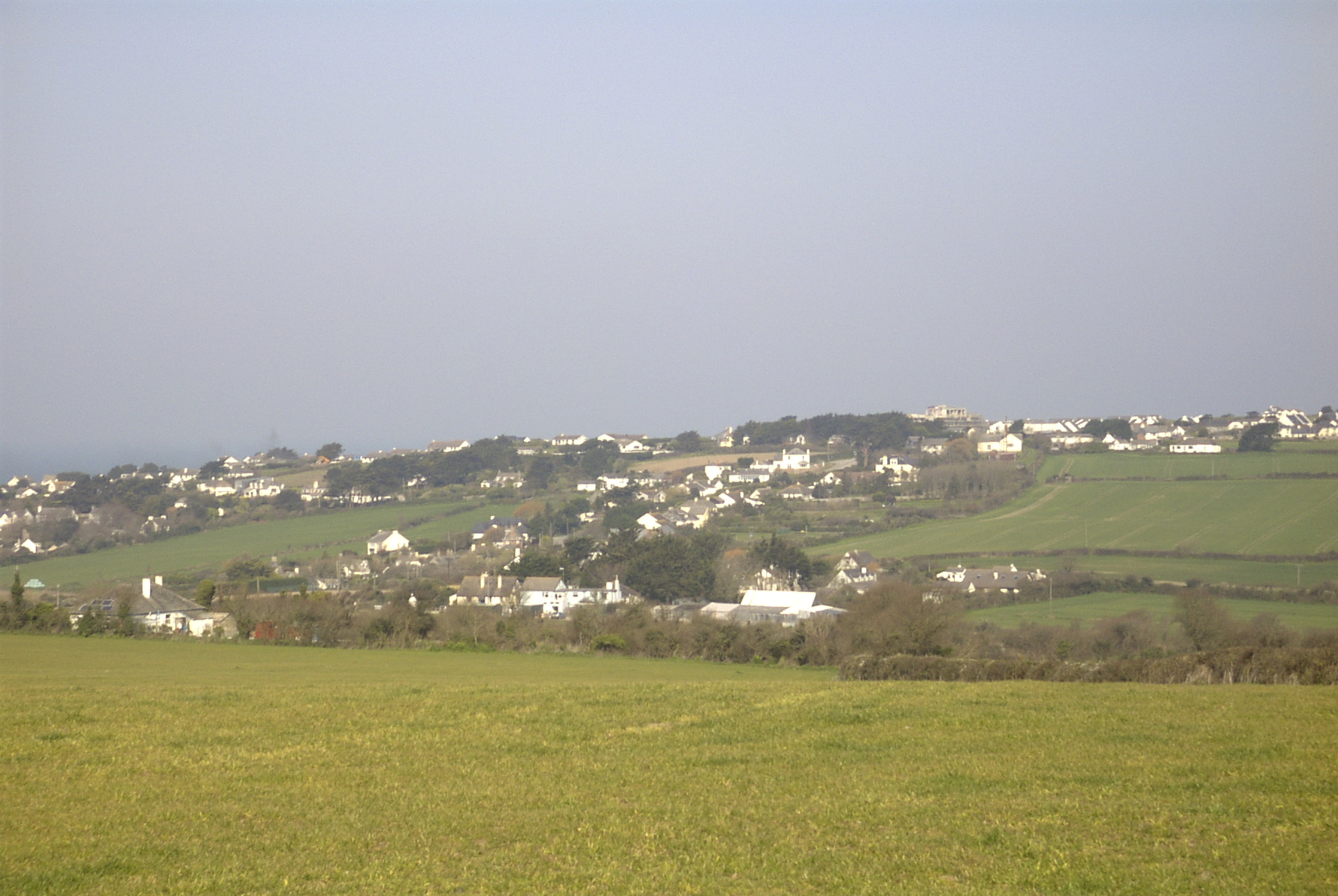
- Trebetherick from the south

- Location within Cornwall
- Population: 1,449 (2001 Census, includes Polzeath)
- OS grid reference: SW934782
- Civil parish: St Minver Lowlands
- Shire county: Cornwall
- Region: South West
- Country: England
- Sovereign state: United Kingdom
- Post town: WADEBRIDGE
- Postcode district: PL27
- Dialling code: 01208
- Police: Devon and Cornwall
- Fire: Cornwall
- Ambulance: South Western
- UK Parliament: North Cornwall

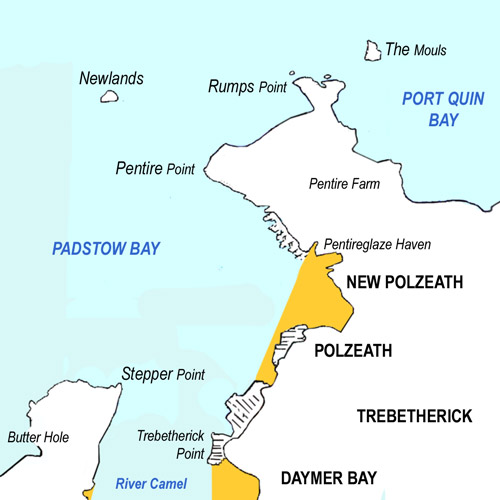
Sketch map showing Trebetherick and surrounding area

Trebetherick (Cornish: Trebedrek) is a village on the north coast of Cornwall. It is situated on the east side of the River Camel estuary approximately six miles (9.7 km) north of Wadebridge and one-half-mile (800-metre) south of Polzeath.

Trebetherick straddles the Polzeath to Wadebridge road and extends west to Daymer Bay and northwest to Trebetherick Point, a rocky headland in the estuary, where the remains of shipwrecks can be seen on the foreshore. The National Trust owns land adjacent to Trebetherick Point.

== Geography ==
South of Trebetherick Point is Daymer Bay with a sandy beach sheltered from the Atlantic. The beach provides safe bathing for holidaying families and is also popular with windsurfers.

At the south end of Daymer Bay Brea Hill rises to 62 metres (203 feet) with several tumuli at the summit.

Behind Daymer Bay's sand dunes and south of Trebetherick is the St Enodoc Golf Club's golf course. Between its fairways is St Enodoc Church, a small church with a bent steeple. It lies considerably below the current surrounding ground level, having been excavated in 1863 after being completely buried by drifting sand.

Trebetherick Point, a headland to the west of the village, is designated as a Site of Special Scientific Interest for its geology. The headland contain deposits from the Quaternary period as well as various slates.

== History ==
Legend has it that St Petroc first landed in Trebetherick before crossing the River Camel to Hawkers Cove.

== John Betjeman ==
As a child, John Betjeman (who would later become Poet Laureate) enjoyed family holidays in Trebetherick and he returned there often as an adult. The surrounding area and its churches, railways and landscape (indeed, Cornwall in general) are celebrated in his work.

Betjeman's poem Greenaway describes the stretch of coast at Trebetherick between Daymer Bay and Polzeath where he often walked. It begins:

I know so well this turfy mile,
These clumps of sea-pink withered brown,
The breezy cliff, the awkward stile,
The sandy path that takes me down.

Another poem, Trebetherick, celebrates the area and also reveals Betjeman's familiarity with, and affection for, this part of the Cornish coast:

We used to picnic where the thrift
Grew deep and tufted to the edge;
We saw the yellow foam-flakes drift
In trembling sponges on the ledge
Below us, till the wind would lift
Them up the cliff and o'er the hedge.

Later in life, Betjeman bought a house called 'Treen' in Daymer Lane, Trebetherick, where he died on 19 May 1984, aged 77. He is buried half a mile away at St Enodoc's Church, a place he commemorated in his poem Sunday Afternoon Service thus:

So grows the tinny tenor faint or loud
And all things draw towards St. Enodoc.

John Betjeman's grave is on the right immediately inside the entrance gate to St Enodoc's churchyard.

== Gallery of images ==
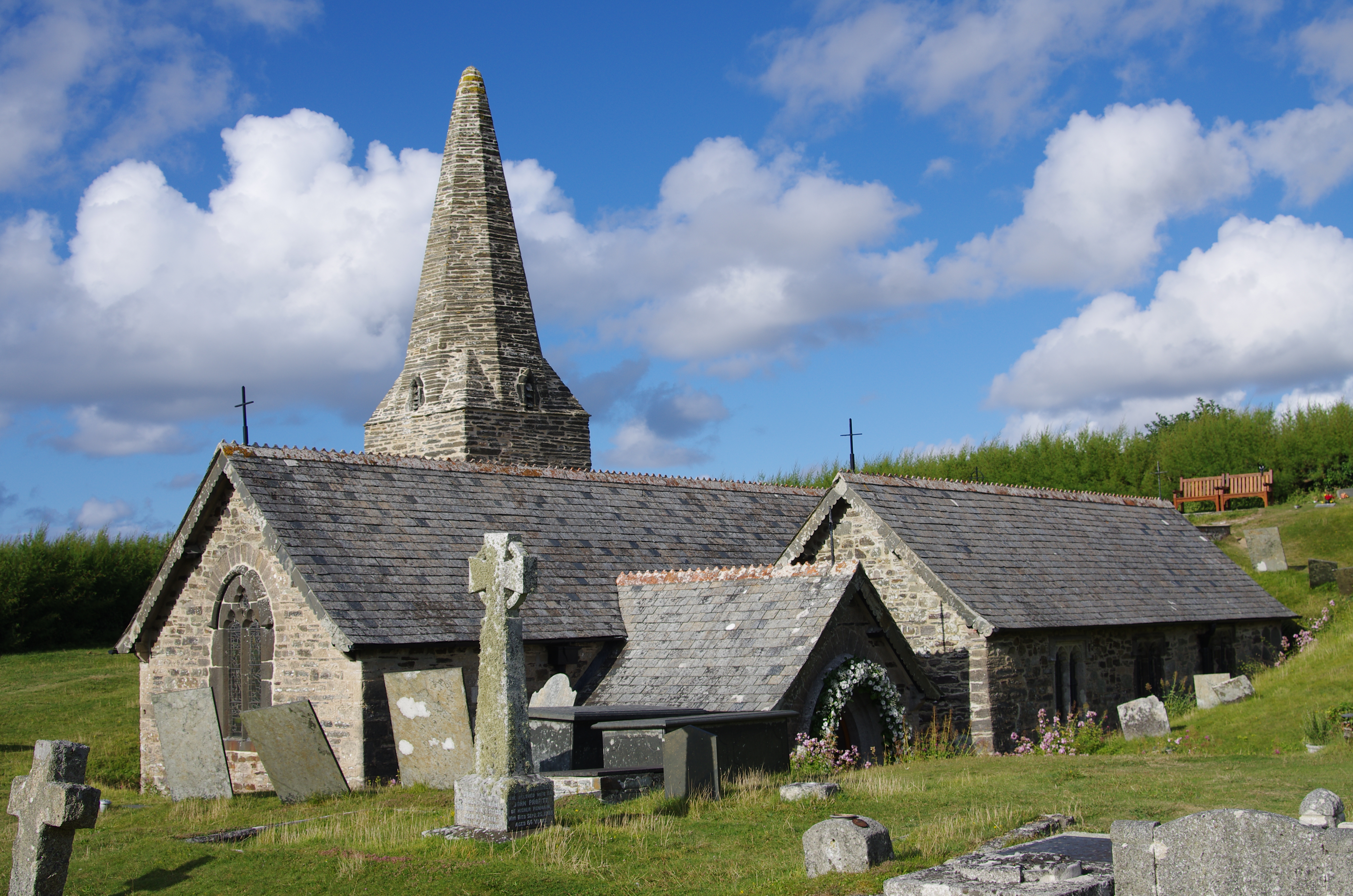
St Enodoc church

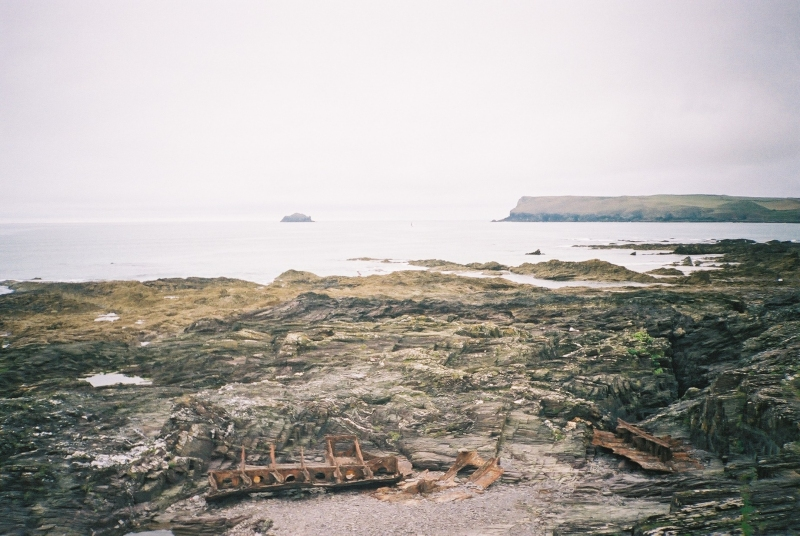
Remains of a shipwreck near Trebetherick Point

The Camel estuary with Trebetherick Point in the foreground

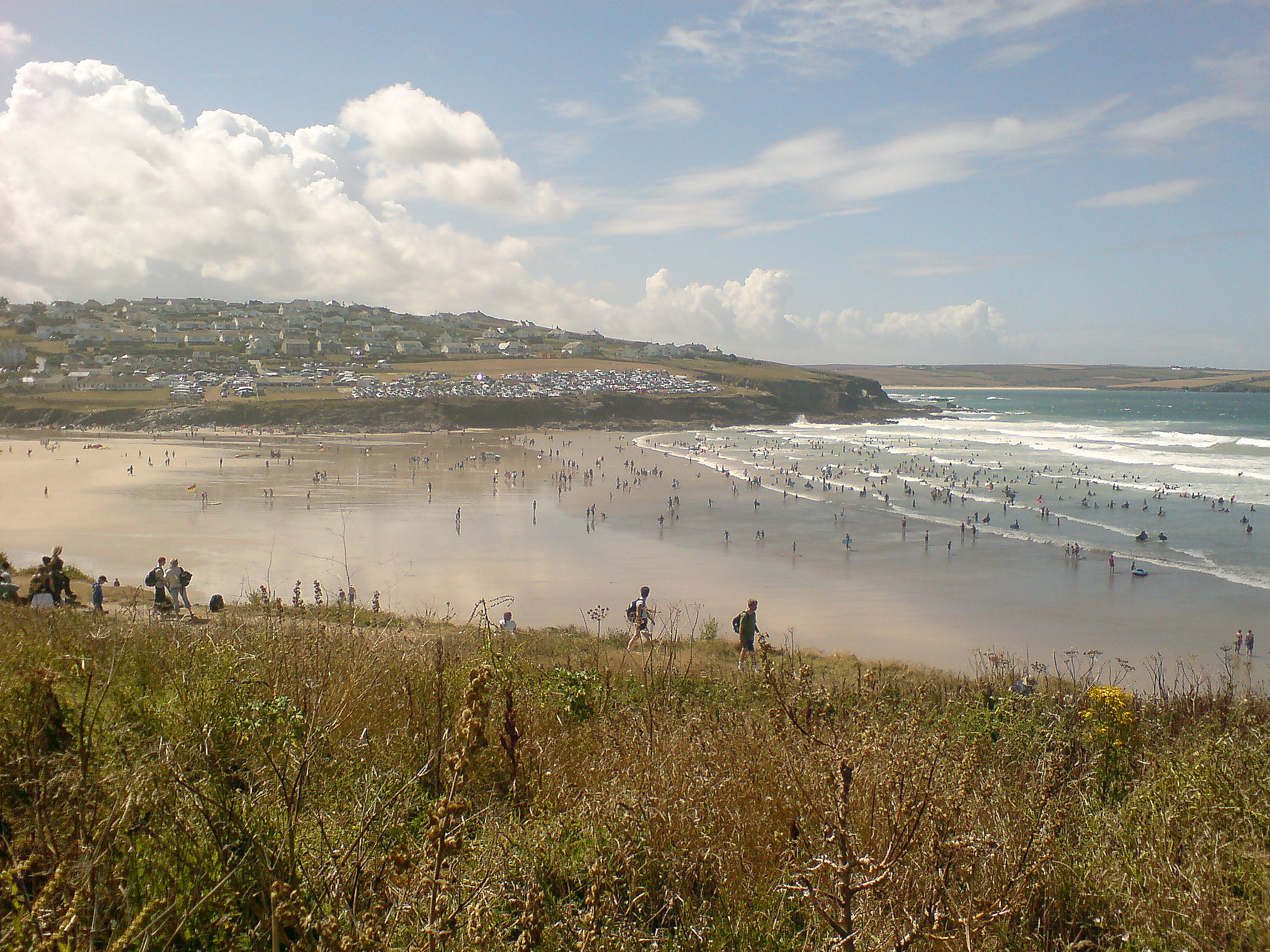
Trebetherick on the hill beyond Polzeath beach

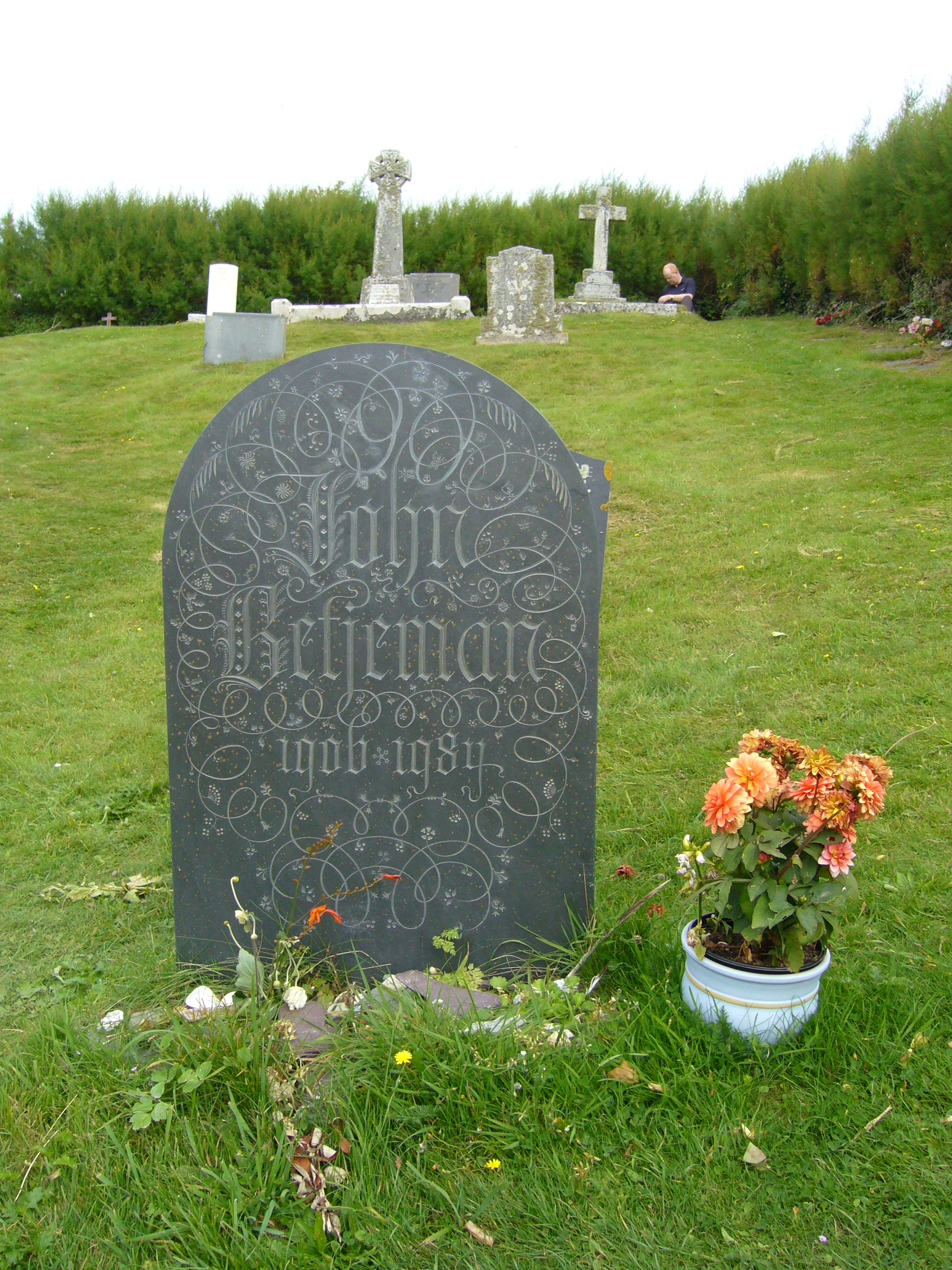
John Betjeman's grave

== See also ==
- Polzeath
- Rock
- List of places in Cornwall
