= River Camel =

River in Cornwall, England

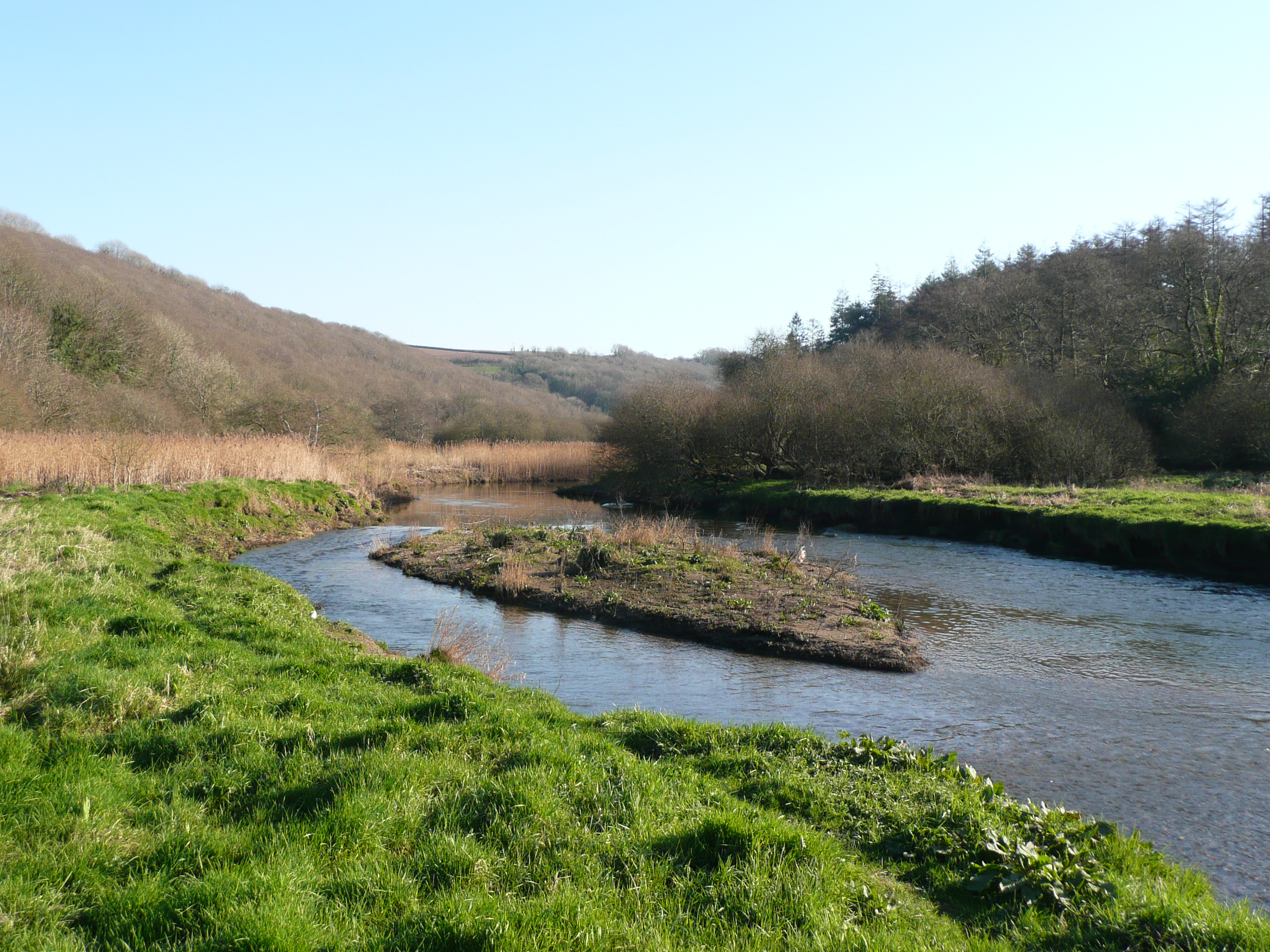
- The Camel valley in winter. Taken from between Pendavey bridge and Polbrock looking upstream.

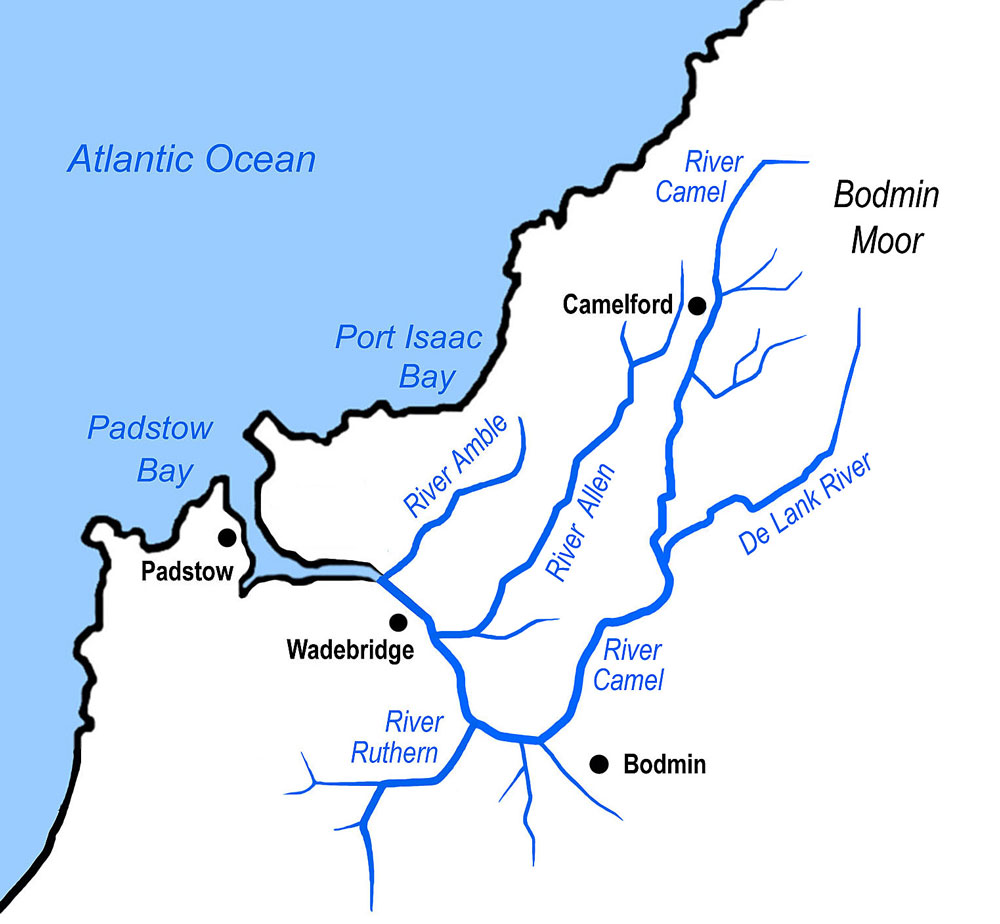
- Sketch map of the River Camel and its tributaries
- Native name: Dowr Kammel (Cornish)

Location
- Country: England
- Region: Cornwall

Physical characteristics
- Source: Hendraburnick Down
  - location: Bodmin Moor
  - coordinates: 50.6582°N 4.6379°W
  - elevation: 218 m (715 ft)
- Mouth: Padstow Bay
  - location: Padstow, North Cornwall coast
  - coordinates: 50.578°N 4.939°W
- Length: 48 km (30 mi)
- Basin size: 413 km^{2} (159 sq mi)

Basin features
- Tributaries
  - left: River Ruthern
  - right: De Lank River, River Allen

The River Camel (Cornish: Dowr Kammel, meaning crooked river) is a river in Cornwall, England. It rises on the edge of Bodmin Moor and with its tributaries its catchment area covers much of North Cornwall. The river flows into the eastern Celtic Sea between Stepper Point and Pentire Point, having covered about 30 miles (50 km), making it the second longest river wholly in Cornwall. The river is tidal upstream to Egloshayle and is popular for sailing, birdwatching and fishing. The name Camel comes from the Cornish language for 'the crooked one', a reference to its winding course. Historically the river was divided into three named stretches. Heyl (Cornish: Heyl, meaning estuary) was the name for the estuary up to Egloshayle, the River Allen (Cornish: Dowr Alen, meaning shining river) was the stretch between Egloshayle and Trecarne, whilst the Camel was reserved for the stretch of river between its source and Trecarne.

== Geology and hydrology ==
The River Camel rises on Hendraburnick Down (UK Grid Reference SX135875) on the edge of Bodmin Moor, an area which forms part of the granite spine of Cornwall. The river's course is through sedimentary upper and middle Devonian rocks, predominantly the Upper Delabole Slates, Trevose Slates and Polzeath Slates that stretch to the coast, making a land which has shallow acidic soils. Other than sedimentary rocks, igneous rocks can be found at Brea Hill and at Pentire Point which is composed mainly of pillow lavas. Across the mouth of the River Camel Stepper Point is composed of greenstone as is The Rumps, a promontory on the north side of Pentire Point facing Port Quin Bay.

Mining slate for building purposes has been carried out at various locations along the river, often with small quarries being created close to where the stone was to be used. Today the only active quarry in the whole River Camel catchment area is at Delabole but there has previously been mining for lead and silver on Pentire Head and around Pinkson Creek and a copper mine at Credis above Little Petherick, Further inland the Camel and its tributaries border the St Austell mining lodes near Lanivet, and mines in this area produced tin, lead, silver, and copper. Iron ore in the form of haematite and associated manganese oxides were also mined in the area. Although not considered a great producer, Mulberry Mine near Ruthernbridge produced in the region of 1300 tons of tin between 1859 and 1916. Records show that copper ore was shipped from Padstow to Neath for smelting, and tin and copper ores were the main commodity carried from Guineaport in 1830. Several small China Clay pits also operated in the 19th century around Blisland and St Breward.

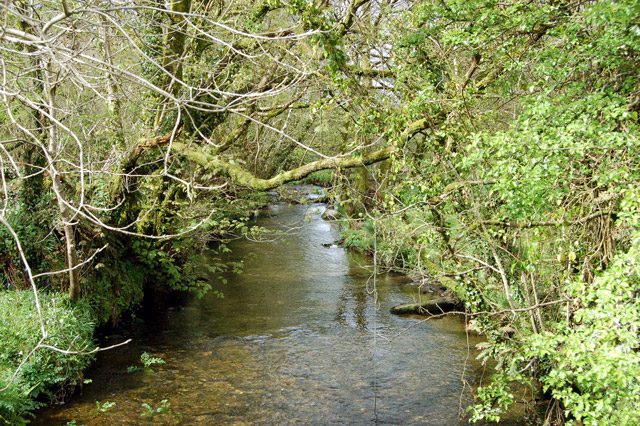
The young River Camel at Slaughterbridge upstream of Camelford

The source of the Camel is at 218 metres (715 ft) above sea level and it has an average incline of 7m/km. The upper reaches of the Camel and its tributaries are mainly moorland giving way to woodland and farmland, predominantly livestock. This means that 64.8% of the catchment is grassland, with a further 14.8% arable land and 12.9% woodland. Of the remaining 7.4%, 4.5% is through urban or built-up areas, 2.7% is mountain, heath and bog and the remainder is inland waters.

The Camel's catchment area covers 413 km^{2} on the western side of Bodmin Moor, and is mainly Devonian slates and granite, with some shales and sandstones. Water volumes are affected by the reservoir at Crowdy Marsh, by abstraction of water for public supply, and by effluent from the sewage system around Bodmin. Data collected by the National River Flow Archive shows that water flow in the River Camel for 2006 was considerably below average. This correlates with reduced rainfall, particularly between the months of June and September. Data from 2013 and 2014 also shows below average annual flow but with points of higher than average flow during Winter.

In a river which runs for much of its length in a steep-sided valley, sudden downpours can cause water levels to rise rapidly and while floods are not unusual on the Camel, the flood of 16 July 1847 was exceptional. Caused by a waterspout and deluge on Davidstow Moor, a wall of water swept away six bridges but Hellandbridge withstood the force of the water, which flowed over the structure leaving debris visible in nearby trees up to 20 feet (6 m) above the normal river level. Today the tidal parts of the River Camel are subject to flood risk, especially during spring tides after periods of high rainfall when the catchment is already saturated. The area around Wadebridge has been identified by the Environment Agency as a Critical Drainage Area (CDA) and due to the tidal element the risk is expected to increase due to climate change. This means that all development in the CDA has to take flooding into account including rainfall runoff.

In 2023 the Environment Agency measured water levels on the River Camel at Sladesbridge, Dunmere and Camelford, and also on the rivers Allen and De Lank which are tributaries of the River Camel.

== Estuary ==
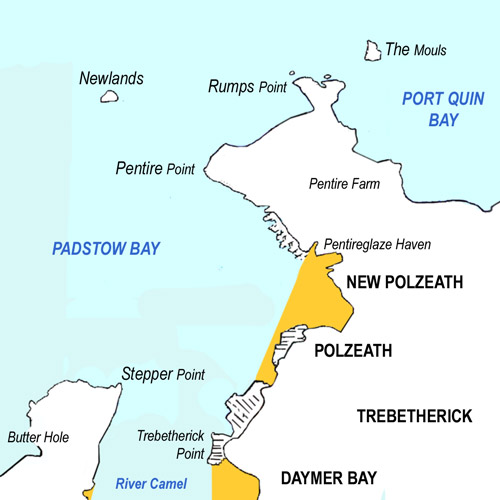
Sketch map of the River Camel estuary

The estuary of the River Camel seen from Pentire Point with Trebetherick Point in the foreground.

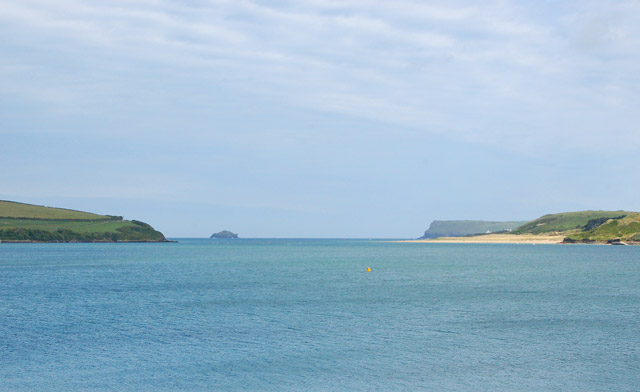
The estuary of the River Camel looking seaward from Padstow

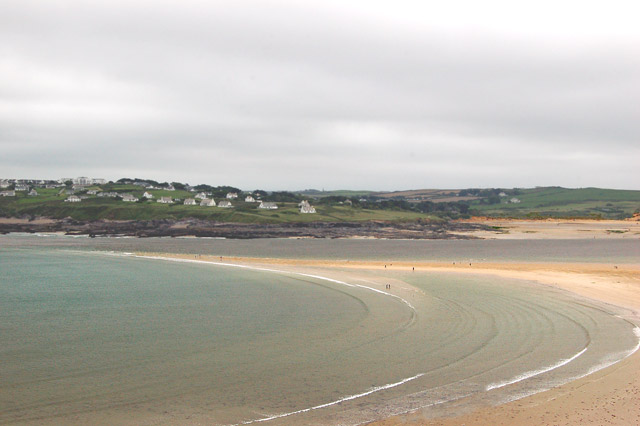
The Doom Bar sandbank extends across the Camel estuary

The next five and a half miles beside the broadening Camel to Padstow is the most beautiful train journey I know

— John Betjeman, Betjeman's Cornwall

The Camel Estuary (Cornish: Heyl Kammel) stretches from Wadebridge downstream to the open sea at Padstow Bay. The quays at Wadebridge are now developed with apartments and retail space on the west bank. North of the quays, the river passes under a concrete bridge carrying the A39 bypass and past the disused Vitriol Quay. Downstream of Burniere Point the valley widens on the right with acres of salt marsh where the River Amble flows in. Here the Cornwall Birdwatching and Preservation Society has hides on both sides of the river; those on the Camel Trail are open to the public. The main river follows the western side of the valley, while on the eastern side a barrage prevents the rising tide from entering the River Amble.

Downstream from the Amble an adit can be found on the foreshore below Dinham Hill, part of Wheal Sisters copper mine. The adit is only accessible from the foreshore at low tide, and is situated near to the location of a tide mill that is recorded at the point where Dinham Creek meets the main river. This mill is shown on a map of the location from the 1830s although no sign of it now remains. Cant Cove lies on the east bank below Cant Hill where the rotting ribs of two ship project from the mud, these being discernable on Google Maps in 2019, and almost opposite Cant Hill on the west bank is Camel Quarry with the piles of waste rock clearly visible above the river and the remains of a quay visible at low water. From here the mud gives way to sand and Gentle Jane, named after a legendary lady who treated the ills of all comers.

From Porthilly Cove on the east bank, the estuary widens and swings to the north. On the west bank, the Camel Trail crosses the triple-span “Iron Bridge” over Little Petherick Creek then passes below Dennis Hill and its obelisk.

The fishing port of Padstow stands on the west bank from where the Black Tor Ferry (officially owned by the Duchy of Cornwall) carries people across the river to Rock.

The mouth of the Camel lies between Stepper Point on the west and Pentire Point on the east, and each headland shelters sandy beaches. On the west side of the estuary, Tregirls beach is protected by Stepper Point. At the northern end of Tregirls beach is Harbour Cove and between here and Hawker's Cove evidence has been found of occupation during the Bronze Age, Iron Age and Roman periods, and use of Harbour Cove for trading vessels.

In 1827, Padstow Harbour Association chose Hawker's Cove as the location for the Padstow lifeboat. Operations were taken over by the RNLI in 1856. A new lifeboat station and slipway were built in 1931 and a second lifeboat stationed at Hawker's Cove. The station closed in 1962 because silting rendered the channel too shallow and the building used to house the lifeboat has been converted to residential use. Movement of sand in various parts of the estuary has affected the ability of vessels to access Padstow harbour for many years, and even in May 2020 a navigation warning was issued relating to an increase in size of a spit of sand between Gun Point and St Saviours Point which is considered to have become a serious hazard to navigation.

Beyond Hawkers Cove a sand bar known as the Doom Bar extends across the estuary. This restricts access to Padstow harbour and has been the graveyard of many ships over the years. In the past there was a proposal to build a pier on the doom bar to funnel the tide and thus scour the main channel and keep it navigable, but nothing was ever constructed. A legend as to how the Doom Bar came about describes how a local fisherman is reputed to have shot a mermaid with an arrow, with the result that she cursed Padstow by putting the sandbar between the harbour and the sea.

On the east side of the estuary, the village of Rock is centre for sailing, dinghy racing and marine leisure. From Rock, dunes and intertidal sands extend north as far as Brea Hill. Beyond Brea Hill is Daymer Bay with a beach north of which is the settlement of Trebetherick. The river then flows past Trebetherick Point and swings east over a rocky stretch of foreshore punctuated by sand at Greenaway before reaching the beach at Polzeath, a location for surfing. North of Polzeath, Pentire Point marks the northeast extremity of the estuary.

== Recreation ==
The Camel Estuary has been designated an Area of Outstanding Natural Beauty (AONB), covering the area between Padstow/Rock and Wadebridge. The estuary comprises part of the Cornwall Area of Outstanding Natural Beauty.

=== Angling ===
In the 1920s Trout fishing was listed as one of the attractions of the river and today it is known for both Trout and Salmon fishing, and particularly for Sea trout with the fishing season running from 1 May to 15 December. Fishing techniques used include spinning, worm bait and Fly fishing. Fishing from the end of August is covered by a voluntary catch-and-release agreement, and the upper reaches are designated as a fish sanctuary and fishing here is prohibited.

For fishing purposes, the River Camel is considered to be tidal from the mouth up to Egloshayle church.

Although not often mentioned when discussing Bass fishing on the River Camel, the whole of the river is a Bass conservation area with a ban on fishing from boats and an increased minimum size for fish caught from the shore. Sea fishing for Flounder is also a feature of the River Camel, particularly in the sandy parts between Padstow and Cant Hill

=== Beaches and bathing ===
On the western bank Hawker's Cove, Tregirls beach and St Georges Cove lie between Stepper Point and Padstow, while on the eastern bank moving upstream from Pentire Point is Polzeath beach, Daymer Bay and Rock. Water quality is monitored at Polzeath and Daymer Bay with water classification for the years 2012 to 2015 for both locations being "Excellent". Water quality was previously monitored at Rock, results from 2007 for all three locations on the eastern bank of the river being either "good" or "excellent".

=== Mountain biking ===
The steep-sided parts of the Camel valley are ideal for mountain biking, and several trails are maintained. Particularly accessible are those on land owned by the Forestry Commission at Cardinham Woods and Hustyns Woods.

=== Walking ===
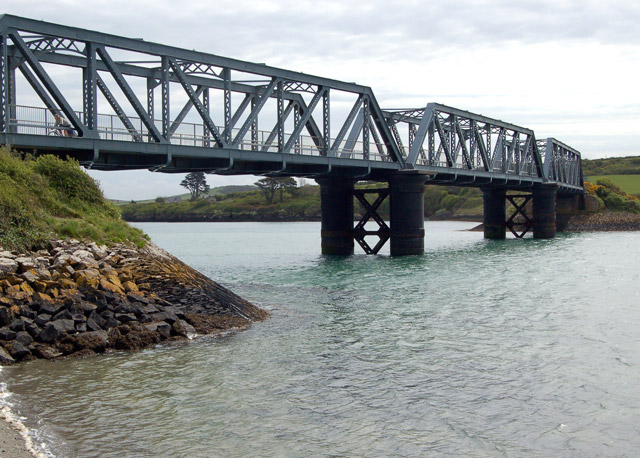
The Camel Trail crosses Petherick Creek on this bridge which formerly carried the North Cornwall Railway

The Camel Trail, used by walkers and cyclists, follows the trackbed of the Bodmin and Wadebridge Railway from Wenfordbridge, past the outskirts of Bodmin at Dunmere, and through Wadebridge to Padstow.

From Poleys Bridge near Wenfordbridge, the Camelford Way follows the valley of the River Camel further up to the town of Camelford.

The South West Coast Path follows the River Camel from Pentire Point to Rock, and from Padstow to Stepper Point. It crosses the river using the Black Tor Ferry.

The Saints' Way footpath links Padstow with Fowey. It follows first the River Camel, and then Little Petherick Creek from Padstow to Little Petherick, before striking inland and crossing the county to the River Fowey. This route is a very ancient one used by travellers from Ireland and Wales making for Brittany and wishing to avoid the dangerous seas around Lands End.

=== Water sports ===
Canoeing and Kayaking take place on the river Camel with a dedicated access point just above the bridge at Wadebridge. Further up there are stretches that are particularly favoured such as between Tuckingmill to Penrose which has grade 2 rapids.

Water skiing takes place on the estuary based in Rock, with four set courses located between Dennis cove and Pinkson creek. Rock is also a centre for sailing with the Rock Sailing and Waterski Club being founded in 1938

Daymer Bay and Hawkers Cove are good locations for Kitesurfing, particularly freestyle and wakestyle. These locations being on opposite sides of the river provide between them kitesurfing opportunities for all wind directions, although kitesurfing is not allowed at either venue during the daytime in July and August. Kitesurfing UK list Hawkers cove as one of their favourite kitesurfing spots in Cornwall.

== Wildlife and conservation ==
The majority of the Camel Estuary, from Padstow/Porthilly upstream to Wadebridge are part of the Cornwall Area of Outstanding Natural Beauty and thus considered worthy of special landscape protection. There are also five Sites of Special Scientific Interest (SSSIs) along the length of the Camel. Four small SSSIs at Harbour Cove, Rock Dunes, Trebetherick Point and Pentire Peninsula are on the estuary, while the River Camel Valley and Tributaries SSSI covers much of the Camel Valley between Egloshayle and Blisland, and extends in several further sections of varying size up to its source. This SSSI also includes much of the River Allen, a tributary which flows into the river immediately upstream of Egloshayle, and some smaller unnamed tributaries. In addition, there is an SSSI at Amble Marshes on the River Amble which flows into the Camel Estuary between Wadebridge and Rock.

The River Camel was designated by the Joint Nature Conservation Committee as a Special Area of Conservation in April 2005 as being of European importance for the otter and the bullhead, and this was reviewed in 2015. However publicly available information on the area is unclear as the DEFRA Joint Nature Conservation Committee website shows the area stretching from Pinkson Creek on the Camel estuary up to Polbrock bridge, but incorporating Pinkson Creek, the River Allen to just upstream of Sladesbridge, and the Polmorla Brook almost to the edge of the Wadebridge built-up area, and incorporating all of the intertidal zone. In contrast, both the Marine Conservation Institute and ProtectedPlanet show the area from Wadebridge bridge upstream, including the Ruthern, Allen, De Lank and Stannon, all being shown as covered to their respective sources., the only part of this area considered tidal is between Wadebridge bridge and St Marys church Egloshayle.

There are two nature reserves on Camel and its tributaries. The Walmsley sanctuary of the Cornwall Birdwatching and Preservation Society is on the Amble marshes on the River Amble above Trewornan Bridge. Hawke's Wood reserve, owned by the Cornwall Wildlife Trust, is on the south side of the Camel Valley between Wadebridge and Dunmere. Here is an abandoned quarry in a mature woodland of predominantly sessile oak, this latter habitat also being named as contributary to the Special Area of Conservation listing.

=== Birds ===
With the large areas of salt marsh on the estuary, the river provides an excellent location for birds. Large flocks of waders can be seen in winter, preyed on by peregrine falcons, and a migrant osprey often pauses a few days to fish in spring and autumn. Mute swans nest at several locations, particularly near to the bridge in Wadebridge. Shelduck, shoveler and mallard are found on the river and teal further upstream.

A belted kingfisher was seen in the 1980s for only the second time in England and the estuary has been noted for early colonisation by egret species. In the 1980s and 1990s little egrets were to be seen on mudflats at low tide, and more recently large numbers of cattle egrets have been found on the River Amble and near Burniere, and have now become sufficiently common not to require corroborating evidence when reporting sightings.

Upstream and on several of its tributaries, kingfishers can be seen, while the Cornwall Wildlife Trust reserve at Hawkes Wood is noted for nuthatches and tawny owls.

There are three birdwatching hides overlooking the River Camel. Tregunna Hide (Grid reference SW 969 738), owned by Cornwall County Council, is located by the Camel Trail and is open to the public. Burniere Hide (Grid Reference SW 982 740) is owned by the Cornwall Birdwatching and Preservation Society (CBWPS) is open to members. In addition the CBWPS own the Walmsley Sanctuary which covers over 20 hectares (49 acres) on the River Amble, with two further hides for use by its members. The Walmsley sanctuary is nationally important for wintering waders and wildfowl. These hides are located on the estuary below Wadebridge while upstream of Wadebridge there is a hide overlooking Treraven Meadow located 500m from Guineaport towards Bodmin

Sometimes nationally rare bird species have been recorded in the Camel valley or on one of the major tributaries. In 2010 an American bittern was recorded on the River Amble having flown in from the River Camel nearby, and in 2016 a Dalmatian pelican was recorded on the River Camel at various locations between Rock and Dinham

=== Fish ===
The estuary is a sea bass conservation area. This was originally designated as being upstream from a line drawn between Stepper Point and Trebetherick Point but this was extended to include all waters upstream of a line between Stepper Point and Pentire Point in 1999. Surfers at Polzeath have recounted seeing bass swimming around their surfboards in summer. Flounders can be found in the brackish waters around the entrance to Little Petherick Creek, and Daymer Bay is noted as a location for fishing from the rocks.

Egg cases from shark and ray species are regularly found on the beaches near the mouth of the river, and have been recorded as far up as Porthilly and Dennis Cove. Species whose egg cases have been identified include Small-spotted catshark, Small-eyed Ray, Spotted Ray, Nursehound, Cuckoo Ray, Blonde Ray, Undulate Ray, and Thornback Ray.

Salmon and sea trout are found in the River Camel and have been fished since the 12th century when the Priory at Bodmin constructed a Salmon weir near Dunmere and Salmon is named as a contributary species in the designation of the River Camel as a Special Area of Conservation. More recently the Camel had a reputation for good runs of both salmon and sea trout up to the early 2000s, particularly in the area around Bodmin, but there was a rapid decline in the late 2010s leading to the Environment Agency placing restrictions on salmon fishing in the river in 2017. There have also been significant reductions in catches of sea trout and while a total of over 900 fish were caught in 2010, this reduced to less than 300 fish in 2016.

Occasionally basking sharks can be seen at the mouth of the river and very occasionally bottlenose dolphins can be seen. The largest and most unusual fish reported to have been found in the river was a sturgeon weighing 432 pounds (196 kg) which was stranded by the outgoing tide in June 1887.

=== Flora ===
By the Atlantic Ocean the flora is distinctly maritime, characterised by thrift and sea campion on exposed clifftops and spring squill and heather in the turf. Stunted blackthorn and gorse tolerate more exposed sites, while the quarry on Stepper Point is home to many species of marsh plants. Above Egloshayle there are beds of yellow flag iris while the wooded slopes of the valley are filled with bluebells in spring.

The camel is home to two invasive non-native species; Japanese knotweed and Himalayan balsam. Both are the subject of manual control on various stretches of the river.

The valley and its immediate environs are, in parts, thickly wooded with managed plantations at Cardinham and Dunmere near Bodmin and Bishop's, Hustyn, and Grogley Woods between Bodmin and Wadebridge all managed by the Forestry Commission with mature Douglas fir as well as mixed deciduous trees. Before that the Bodmin and Wadebridge Railway planted avenues of elm Trees along the line of the railway, and there were also elms near the railway between Wadebridge and Padstow, now gone as a result of Dutch elm disease. Another tree that is uncommon, but is found in the Camel valley is the wild service tree, an indicator of ancient woodland or hedgerows.

=== Mammals ===
The Camel and its tributaries are home to otters. These were hunted up to the early 20th century but are now one of the species cited in the River Camel and Tributaries SSSI.

Red deer and roe deer can both be seen in the valleys of the River Camel and its tributaries, with roe deer being the more common.

Badgers can be found throughout the Camel Valley, but in 2016 DEFRA announced a badger cull zone covering North Cornwall, the boundary of which encompasses the rivers Camel and Allen. The cull, which resulted in over 1500 badgers being killed in North Cornwall in 2016, is intended to reduce instances of Bovine TB but has proved controversial.

=== Molluscs ===
The beaches and cliffs around the mouth of the River Camel are home to a variety of marine molluscs, and on beaches exposed to longshore drift one can also find shells washed up with the tide, particularly after westerly storms. Common limpet, blue mussel and the barnacle (Chthamalus stellatus) are commonly found on rocks that are covered at high tide, with dog whelk and common periwinkle found in tidal rockpools. The banded wedge shell and blunt tellin (Arcopagia crassa) can also be found as far upstream as Padstow.

== History and infrastructure ==
=== Transport and Industry ===
Cornwall is an undulating county with high cliffs, rough moors and deep valleys, so rivers have been used for transport throughout history. Being one of the few safe havens on the north coast of Cornwall, the Camel Estuary has been used since Roman times and most likely earlier, and by the 18th century the port of Padstow was the second largest importer of coal in Cornwall after Falmouth. The river has previously been navigable beyond Wadebridge with the highest quays being at Guineaport and Egloshayle, and ships were recorded beyond that at least as far as Pendavy a mile further upstream while Polbrock was given as the limit of navigation in 1814. The river as far as Wadebridge was considered navigable for vessels up to 150 tons in 1830 and Wadebridge was used as the location for loading granite, iron ore and china Clay onto ships for onward transport. Advice from the Maritime and Coastguard Agency published in 2003 indicates that the River is now only navigable for merchant vessels as far as Brea Hill.

During the period of canal building in Britain the River Camel was investigated as one end of a canal looking to join the north and south coasts of Cornwall by linking to the River Fowey. The first plan, often referred to as the "Polbrock Canal" was put forward in 1794 and engineer John Rennie was engaged to advise on the idea. The canal was intended to be 5 foot (1.5 m) deep and 32 foot (10 m) wide, but Rennie advised that a tunnel would be required on the route and that little through traffic could be anticipated so no further effort was expended. Soon after in 1796 an act of Parliament was passed authorising a canal from Guineaport to Dunmere with a branch to Ruthernbridge but in the event no start was made and the scheme lapsed. In the 1820s Marc Brunel, the father of Isambard Kingdom Brunel considered the possibility of a ship canal looking to make a connection similar to that proposed in 1794 between the rivers Camel and Fowey but again little return on the investment was predicted and nothing was built.

With boats as one of the main methods of transporting goods until the advent of the railways there were several quays along the river, often at the limit of navigation of the many tributaries and creeks on the estuary. There were quays at Little Petherick and Trevorrick Mills on Little Petherick Creek and before construction of the railway between Wadebridge and Padstow there was a quay at Pinxton Creek. Also on the south bank of the estuary two quays served the nearby Camel Quarry and Penquean Quarry, the quays being used to export the slate quarried there and, as the slate was raised from up to 60 feet (20 m) depth, to bring in coal for the two engines used for pumping and sawing, although both quarries had ceased operation before the railway line separated them from the river. Joining the main river upstream of Camel Quarry, the River Amble was navigable up to Chapel Amble on high spring tides, with seaweed, sand and coal being taken up to the village and grain brought out again. Construction of the bridge at Trewornan did not prevent access to Chapel Amble, but the tidal barrage which prevents salt water going upstream past Burniere Point has left the River Amble inaccessible from the main river. Nearer to Wadebridge there was a quay at Trevilling on the north bank of the river built in the 19th century for a Vitriol works and thus known as the 'Vitriol Quay', the location downstream from the town near the current A39 Wadebridge Bypass bridge being appropriate for the product.

Despite the many opportunities for transport along the estuary, historically the main traffic on the river above Padstow was to the Quays at Wadebridge where there is evidence of a dock dating back as far as Elizabethan times, and in 1830 the limit of navigation was recorded as Guineaport. Construction of the Bodmin and Wadebridge Railway in 1834 was based on taking sand brought up to Wadebridge by 12 ton barges that were poled under the bridge at Wadebridge with the sand then being transhipped to the railway for onward transport. From a specially built sand dock at Wadebridge the railway took the sand further up the valley, replacing the previous use of pack animals that took the sand from landings at Sladesbridge and a quay at Marsh cottages near Egloshayle church.

In common with much of Cornwall lime was a common commodity for transportation in the 18th and 19th centuries and the Camel was no exception with lime kilns being recorded at Egloshayle with a quay adjacent, another at Bishop's Quay below Gonvena Hill, and one on the town side of the river adjacent to the Pomorla brook The furthest downstream was a lime kiln at the small inlet where the current sewage works is located.

On the estuary itself there was no need to transport sand by barge, and 'sanding lanes' were laid from local villages directly onto the foreshore so that carts could be taken down at low tide and loaded with sand. On the southern side of the estuary 'sanding lanes' linked Higher Halwyn to Oldtown Cove, Tregunna to the River at White House, Tregonce to Little Petherick Creek and also St Issey to Benuick near Sea Mills, also on Little Petherick Creek. On the northern side of the estuary the access lane to Daymer Bay has its origins as a sanding lane.

=== Historic sites ===
There are several ancient defensive sites along the Camel Valley. Penhargard Castle is an Iron Age defended settlement near Helland situated high on the eastern side of the Camel valley with extant ramparts up to 10 ft (3 m), and not far away on the other side of the river is an older hillfort. Rather earlier in date is Killibury Castle above Egloshayle which originates from the late Bronze Age, was in use throughout the Iron Age and was re-occupied during the Roman period. It is a scheduled monument of national importance. Also Roman in date but several miles up the valley there is the remains of a Roman fort near Nanstallon overlooking the river which was once thought to have been the only Roman Fort in Cornwall, and was only occupied between 60 and 80AD. Less certain is the association of a Roman legion with the area around Cant Hill. The evidence in circumstantial, with the name Cant being associated with the Latin canti meaning 'corner' and nearby Carlyon Farm through a spelling from the 13th century of Carleghion being interpreted as car meaning camp and leighion meaning legion, while the name Cant is attributed by others to ownership by the De Cant family. Although Cant Hill may not have any substantiated links to the Roman period, Roman coins, ornaments and pottery have been found in the area of Brea Hill where there is believed to have been a Roman camp.

There was at one time a small chapel located at St Saviours point downstream of Padstow where a monk would keep a light at night to assist shipping, and it is considered likely that this was associated with Bodmin Priory which held land at Padstow, although the provision of this light ceased with the dissolution of the monasteries. More certainly associated with Bodmin Priory is the building of the bridge over the Camel at Dunmere in the 12th Century and the small chapel that stood on the Bodmin side of the river at the location that is now known as St Annes Chapel Hayes.

=== Crossings ===
Wherever there are rivers, people will need to cross them. Routes of ancient trackways and Roman Roads in Cornwall are, at best, open to speculation but although most maps of Roman Roads show nothing west of Isca Dumnoniorum (modern Exeter) there is some evidence of Romans creating or using roads or paths in the county in the shape of Roman Milestones. The routes of the three main roads through Cornwall, following generally the alignment of the current A30, A38 and A39 are believed to have ancient origins, and if this is true then there would need to be a historic crossing of the Camel, most likely somewhere near Wadebridge. There is no record of how old the ford at Wadebridge is, but it is likely of great antiquity. There is also some speculation of a further ancient ford of the Camel in the area around Camelford, which in the same manner is likely near to the route of the current road through the town.

Further down towards the sea, the Black Tor Ferry has crossed the estuary between Padstow and Rock since 1337, the title to run the ferry resting with the Duchy of Cornwall.

The natural progression for a road crossing a river or stream is to replace the ford with a bridge, and the River Camel and tributaries are crossed by more listed bridges than any other river in Cornwall with the most notable being at Wadebridge. Referred to as "the longest and fairest bridge in Cornwall" it was the furthest bridge downstream on the river until the opening of the A39 Wadebridge bypass in 1993. Built in the 15th century Wadebridge bridge was built by John de Harlan at the instigation of Vicar of Egloshayle Thomas Loveybond and replaced an earlier ford which was considered so dangerous to use at certain times that a chapel was built on either bank; one to pray for a safe crossing and the other to give thanks. The bridge was made a county bridge in the reign of James I, and has been widened three times over the years, being granted Grade II listed status in 1969.

Moving upstream from Wadebridge, the other listed bridges are Helland Bridge, Wenfordbridge, Coombe Mill Bridge, Gam Bridge, and Slaughterbridge, this latter so named as it is the location of an historic battle, possibly that of King Arthur's last battle. While the heritage value of ancient crossings is great, continued use of structures that are several hundred years old and that were designed and built with lighter and less frequest traffic in mind can have a deleterious effect on the fabric of these bridges. Helland Bridge was added to the Historic England Heritage at Risk Register in 2020 citing an "Immediate risk of further rapid deterioration or loss of fabric" This is perhaps unsurprising as Hellandbridge is still completely original, while Wenfordbridge and Gam Bridge, along with Pendavey, Dunmere, Poley's and Tresarret bridges, were broken by the flood of 1847 and were subsequently rebuilt.

One of the largest structures on the Estuary is the "Iron Bridge", a three span girder bridge of 400 ft (120 m) originally built to carry the North Cornwall Railway between Wadebridge and Padstow over Petherick Creek. Good use was made of the river during construction as the metalwork was brought to Wadebridge by boat and then floated on barges down to where the bridge was being built. Sitting on Dennis Hill overlooking the bridge is an Obelisk erected to celebrate the Golden Jubilee of Queen Victoria'. Erected in 1889 the granite obelisk is Grade II listed.

=== Military ===
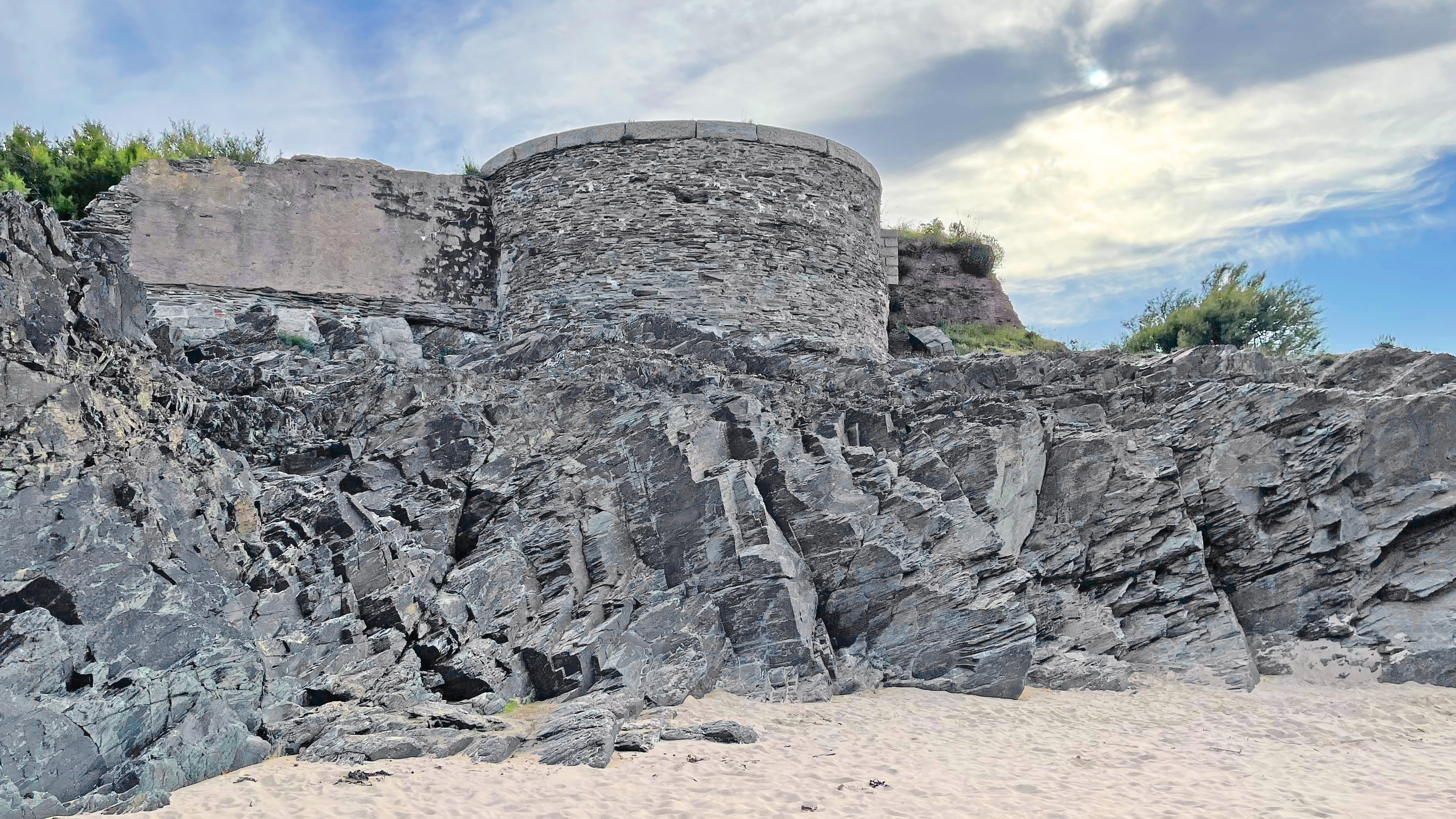
The napoleonic gun platform at Gun Point.

Although the River itself has never been a location for military bases, some parts have been used periodically for military purposes. Other than the Roman forts noted above, one of the earliest military installations was at Gun Point just downstream of Padstow. Henry VIII sited guns here when there was considered a threat of invasion by the Spanish, and Queen Elizabeth expanded these, and guns were also sited here during the Napoleonic Wars. In 1940 during World War II a pair of 4 inch naval guns were mounted on Gun Point, the installation being known as Padstow Coastal Gun Battery. The guns were replaced in 1942 with a pair of larger guns but these in turn were removed in July 1945, although some remains of the installation was still extant in 2018.

== Water pollution incident ==
In July 1988, the water supply to Camelford and the surrounding area was contaminated when 20 tons of aluminium sulphate was poured into the wrong tank at Lowermoor Water Treatment Works on Bodmin Moor. An inquiry into the incident (the worst of its kind in British history) started in 2002, and a report was issued in January 2005 but questions remain as to the long-term effects on the health of residents. Michael Meacher, who visited Camelford as environment minister, called the incident and its aftermath, "A most unbelievable scandal."

== Tributaries and their names ==
The main tributaries of the River Camel are the Allen, the Ruthern, the De Lank and the Stannon. Other tributaries include Little Petherick Creek which joins the main estuary through the Iron Bridge on the Camel Trail, the River Amble which joins the Camel though a tidal barrage near Burniere Point, and the Polmorla Brook (historically Treguddick Brook) which joins the Camel immediately above the bridge at Wadebridge.

In terms of its name there is evidence that what is now known as the River Camel has had several names in the past. The name Camel is derived from Middle Cornish "Cam-El", "Crooked one", and seems originally to have referred only to the upper parts. The lower part of the river was referred to as the River Allen, a common Celtic river name of unknown derivation, but the names were somewhat interchangeable, and even a hybrid Camb-alan wss recorded in the 16th Century. By the 19th Century the name Allen was exclusively used for the River Layne which flows into the Camel just above Egloshayle and the name Camel applied to the whole length of the river. The Camel estuary appears to have been called the River Hayle from Middle Cornish "Hayle", estuary and while this may have been as much a description as a proper name, the continued use of the name Hayle Bay for the bay containing Polzeath beach supports this. In turn it has been suggested that the River Layne may have previously been called the River Dewi given the number of places along its course which contain the element.
