= St Minver =

Village and parish in Cornwall, England

Coordinates: 50.559°N 4.874°W

St Minver: Cornish: Sen Menvra
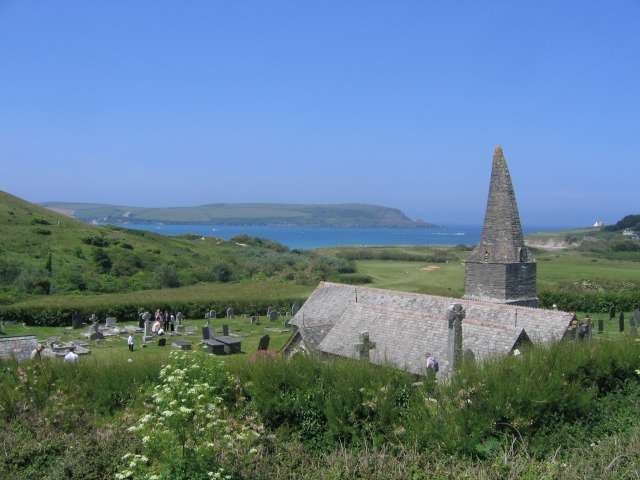
- St Enodoc Church

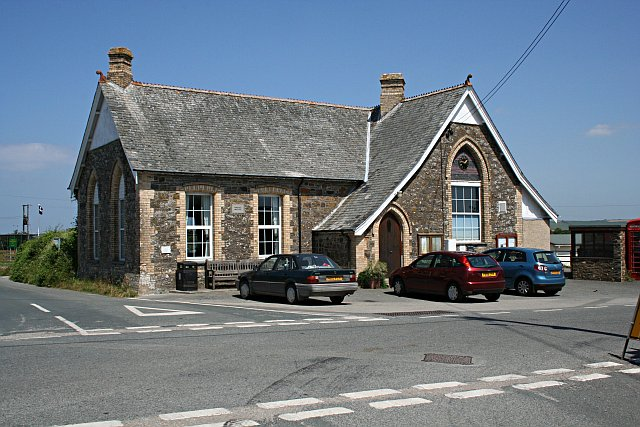
- Perceval Institute

- Location within Cornwall
- Population: 2,393 (Civil Parish, 2011)
- OS grid reference: SW 965 771
- Unitary authority: Cornwall
- Ceremonial county: Cornwall
- Region: South West
- Country: England
- Sovereign state: United Kingdom
- Post town: WADEBRIDGE
- Postcode district: PL27
- Dialling code: 01208
- Police: Devon and Cornwall
- Fire: Cornwall
- Ambulance: South Western
- UK Parliament: North Cornwall

St Minver (Cornish: Sen Menvra) is the name of an ecclesiastical parish, a civil parish and a village in north Cornwall, England, United Kingdom.

The civil parish of St Minver is in Bodmin Registration District and is nominally divided into St Minver Highlands (to the north and east) and St Minver Lowlands (to the west).

The combined parish is bounded on the south and west by the estuary of the River Camel, on the north by the Atlantic coast, and on the east by the parishes of St Endellion and St Kew. The population of the parish in the 2001 census was 2,474 (St Minver Highlands 1025; St Minver Lowlands 1449) decreasing to 2,393 at the 2011 census.

== Settlements ==
The principal villages in the combined parish are the churchtown of St Minver, Rock, Trebetherick and Polzeath. Other settlements include Tredrizzick, Penmean, Splatt, Porthilly, Pityme and Trevanger.

St Minver village is centred on a small square at the crossroads of two unclassified roads. It is situated 3 miles (4.8 kilometres) north of Wadebridge a few hundred yards west of the B3314 Wadebridge to Delabole road.

There is a holiday park formerly of the Haven brand situated on the edge of the village.

== Churches ==
The village of St Minver and its surrounding area is dominated by the tall spire of St Menefreda's church (the parish church) named after Saint Menwreda (variously St Mynfreda or St Minefreda, the origin of the present day name St Minver) who was one of the 24 children of St Brychan, a Welsh king. In the church is the brass of Roger Opy, 1517.

There are two other churches in the parish, both in St Minver Lowlands.

- St Enodoc church is situated between Rock and Trebetherick at grid reference SW 931 772. It was built on towans (coastal sand dunes) in the fifteenth century and gradually became buried by the shifting sands. It was restored in the 1860s and now stands incongruously in the middle of a golf course. John Betjeman, the former poet laureate is buried in the churchyard.
- St Michael's church stands on the south shore of Porthilly Cove, an inlet of the River Camel just south of Rock, at SW 936 753. This church was also substantially restored in the 1860s.

=== Quaker Meeting House and burial grounds ===
There was formerly a meeting-house in this parish, with a cemetery belonging to the Quakers. The walled Quaker burial ground at grid reference SW 955 778 near Treglines was used between 1665 and 1742 and twenty-eight burials are recorded. The ground contains no headstones – only trees.

A small biographical tract was published in 1709, entitled A Brief Narration of the Life, Service, and Sufferings, of That Faithful Servant of Jesus Christ, John Peters; Who Departed This Life, in the 63d Year of His Age; On the 11th Day of the 7th Month, 1708, and was Buried in Friends Burying-Place at Minver in the County of Cornwall, the 13th of the same. Together with the Testimonies of His relations and other Faithful Friends, concerning his Christian example in the Church of Christ. London: Printed and sold by T. Sowle, in White-Hart Court in Gracious-Street, 1709. This person was steward to the Carew family at Roserrow. The walls of the burial ground have been listed by English Heritage.

== Cornish wrestling ==
There have been Cornish wrestling tournaments at St Minver at various venues including the Cricket club.

John Collings (1783–1869) from Porteath in St Minver was a celebrated wrestler in his early life. He also had a famous wrestling brother called Thomas.

Colin Meneer from St Minver was the featherweight champion in 1963, 1966 and 1968.
