= Daymer Bay =

Bay and beach in north Cornwall, England

Coordinates: 50.560°N 4.925°W

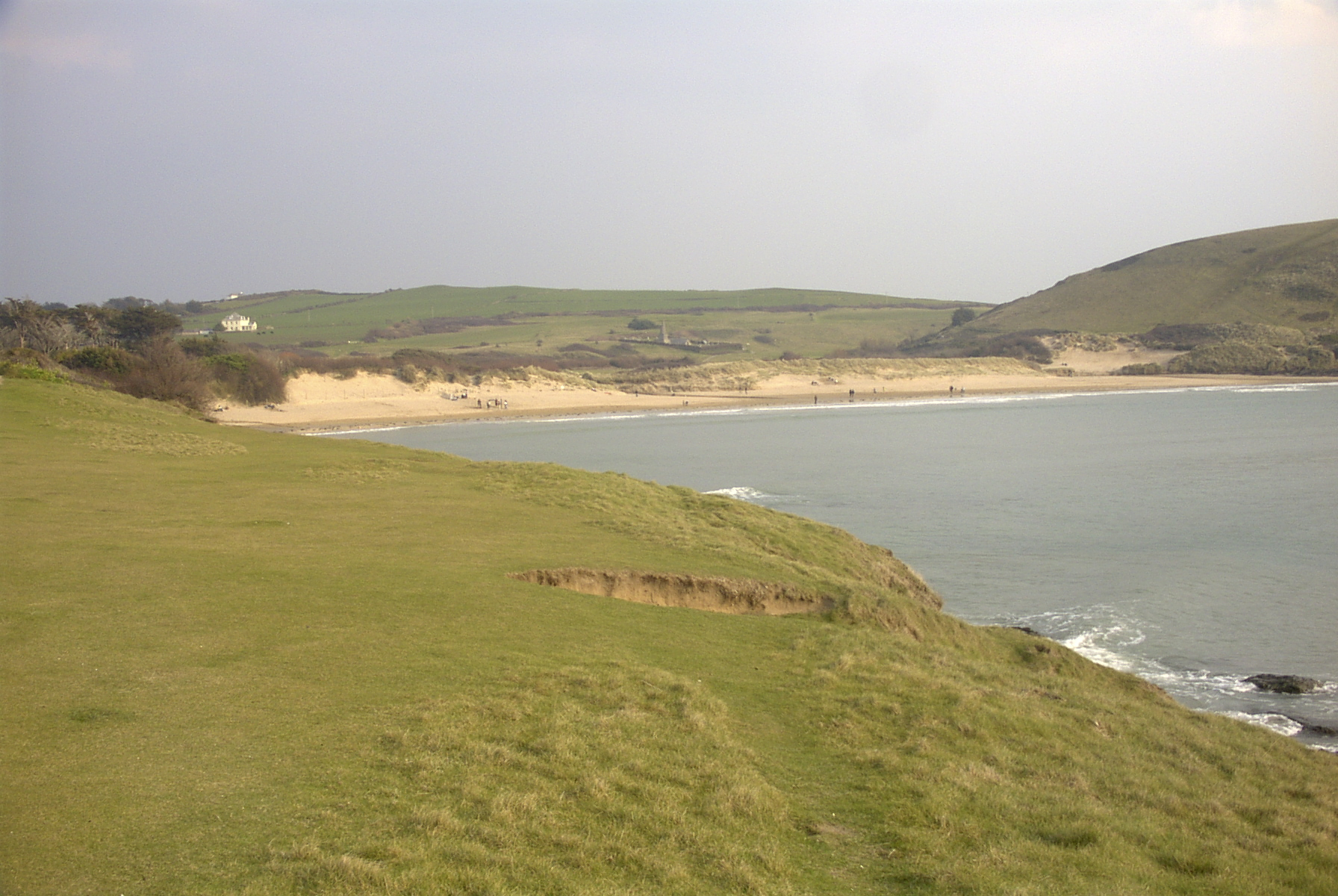
Daymer Bay seen from Trebetherick Point with Brea Hill on the right of the picture. St Enodoc's Church is visible behind the centre of the beach

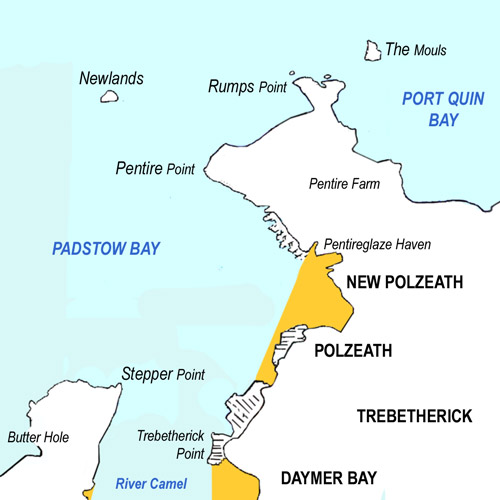
Sketch map showing Daymer Bay and surrounding area

Daymer Bay is a bay and a beach on the east side of the River Camel estuary in north Cornwall, England, United Kingdom. It is situated approximately six miles (10 km) north of Wadebridge.

Daymer Bay lies west of Trebetherick village at grid reference SW 928 775. The bay is bounded to the north by Trebetherick Point and to the south by Brea Hill.

Daymer Bay beach is backed by dunes and behind them is St Enodoc's Church where the poet John Betjeman is buried. The beach is very popular for windsurfing and kitesurfing.

Daymer Bay lies between Trebetherick Point SSSI (Site of Special Scientific Interest) and Rock Dunes SSSI. Much of Daymer Bay is designated as a County Geology Site by Cornwall Wildlife Trust because of the submerged forest sometimes visible at low tide when not totally or partially covered by sand. The submerged forest is one of many in Cornwall and includes tree stumps and roots, woody material, seeds, well-preserved land-snails and bones of frog/toad and other animals, and is dated, from one sample, at between four and four and a half thousand years old.
