= Splatt, Cornwall =

Human settlement in N.Cornwall, England

Coordinates: 50.551°N 4.900°W

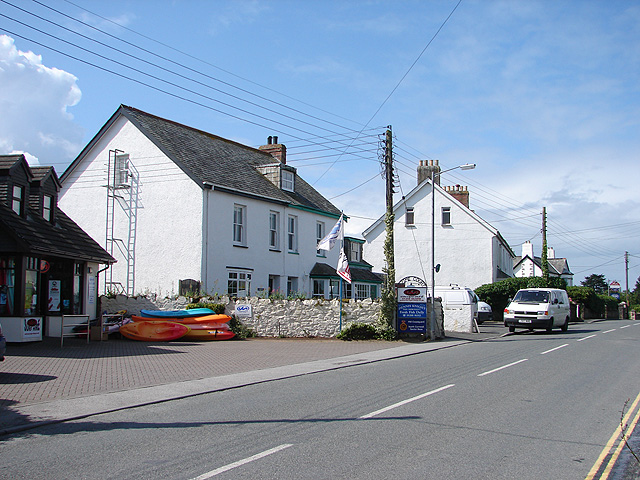
Rock Road, Splatt

Splatt is a small settlement in north Cornwall, England, at grid reference SW 945 763. It lies in St Minver Lowlands parish between Pityme and Rock, although the buildings along the Rock Road are continuous.
