= Rock, Cornwall =

Village in Cornwall, England

Coordinates: 50.5437°N 4.9182°W

Rock: Cornish: Pennmeyn
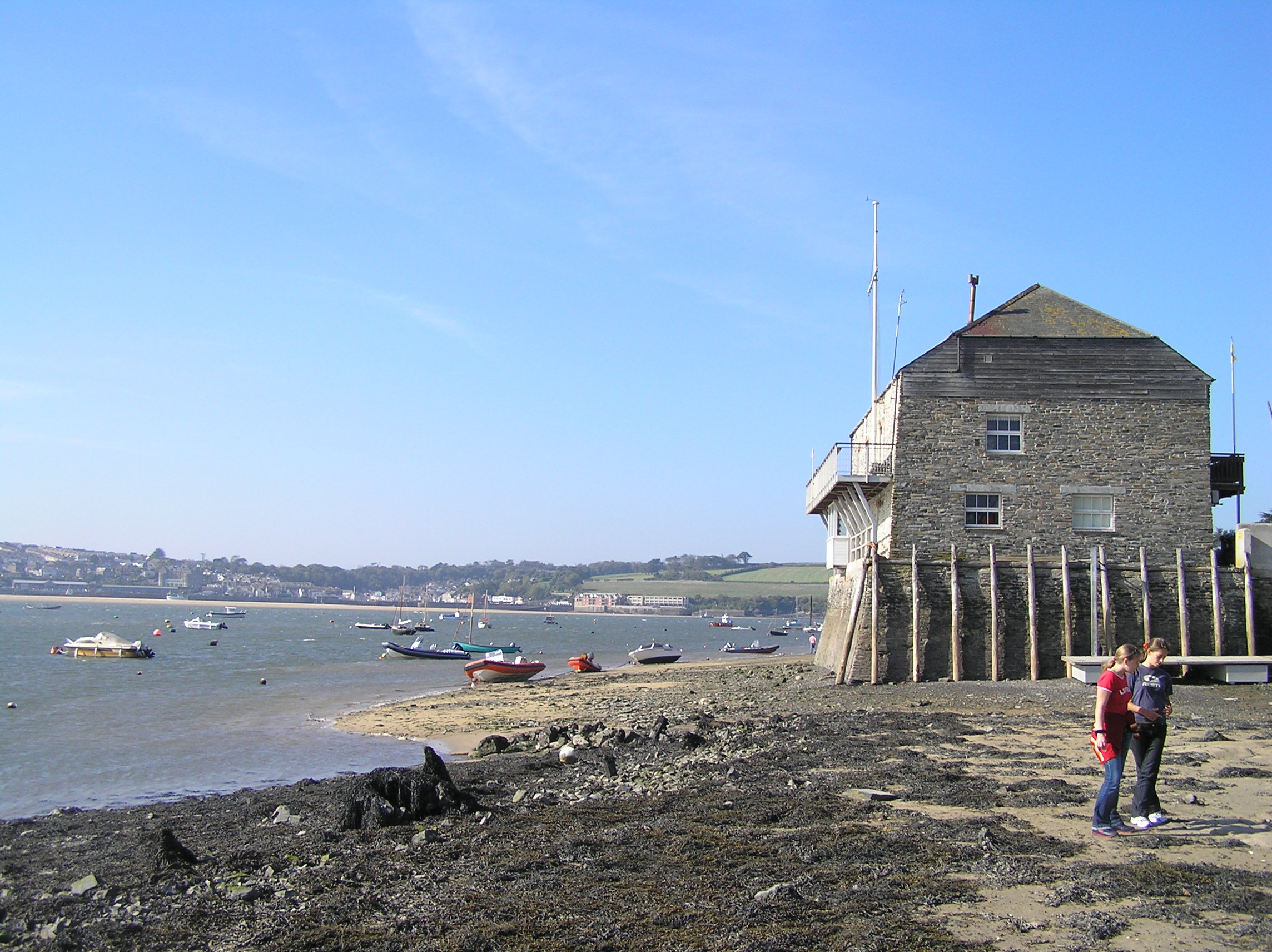
- Rock Sailing Club and the estuary looking west

- Location within Cornwall
- Population: 1,203 2011 Census
- OS grid reference: SW933757
- Civil parish: St Minver Lowlands
- Unitary authority: Cornwall
- Ceremonial county: Cornwall
- Region: South West
- Country: England
- Sovereign state: United Kingdom
- Post town: WADEBRIDGE
- Postcode district: PL27
- Dialling code: 01208
- Police: Devon and Cornwall
- Fire: Cornwall
- Ambulance: South Western
- UK Parliament: North Cornwall

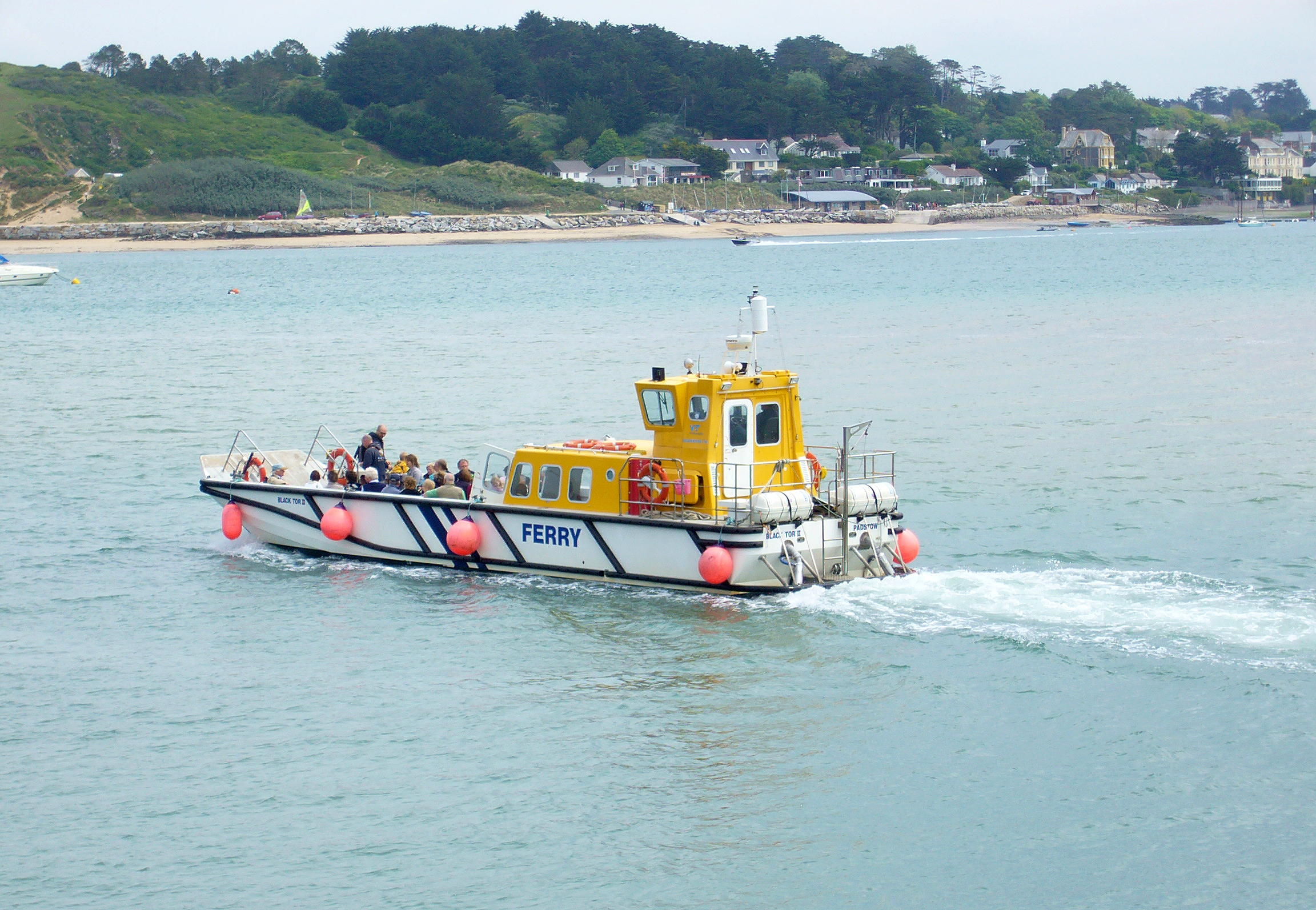
The ferry vessel Black Tor II approaching Rock from Padstow

Rock (Cornish: Pennmeyn, meaning headland of stones) is a coastal fishing village in Cornwall, England, United Kingdom. It is opposite Padstow on the north-east bank of the River Camel estuary. The village is in the civil parish of St Minver Lowlands about 4 miles (6.4 km) north-west of Wadebridge.

== Toponymy ==
The original name recorded in 1303 was Penmayn, Cornish for 'the end or head of stones'. An alternative, Blaketorre ('Black Tor'), is found in 1337. This had become Black Rock by the 18th century and was subsequently shortened to Rock. The name of the ferry that operates between Rock and Padstow recalls the old place name.

== Geography ==
The main residential area is set back from the coast along the road from Pityme and St Minver. To the northeast, Rock is contiguous with the settlements of Splatt and Pityme. Stoptide is a southern extension of Rock. Rock is best known for its estuary frontage. To the northwest, the road runs beside the estuary as a cul de sac giving access to the ferry boarding point and an intertidal beach backed by sand dunes which at low water extend for two miles past Brea Hill to Daymer Bay. To the south is the small coastal settlement of Porthilly with St Michael's Church situated on the bank of Porthilly Cove.

=== Rock Dunes ===
Rock Dunes, sand dunes to the west of the village on the banks of the River Camel, are designated a Site of Special Scientific Interest for their flora and geology. These include various vegetation found in these embryo dunes as well as various types of slate.

== Tourism ==
Burgee of Rock Sailing and Waterski Club, established in 1938

Rock is popular with holidaymakers and in 1881 the hotel was enlarged, a new sea-wall built and a bathing house erected on the beach. In the same year Silvanus Trevail designed and built two large villas. It is now a well-established centre for water sports including dinghy racing, waterskiing, windsurfing, and sailing. Rock Sailing Club's headquarters, in a converted warehouse on a wharf, is a local landmark. Rock Lifeboat Station was established in 1994. Rock has Cornwall's highest proportion of second homes in the county.

The Black Tor Ferry operates across the river to the town of Padstow, and this is a major source of tourist traffic through Rock. The early 21st century has seen extensive building work and increased prosperity for Rock. There are a large number of holiday homes, as well as a number of retail outlets. Rock is also home to Sharp's Brewery, a real ale brewery established as an independent in the mid-1990s, but taken over by Molson Coors in 2011 to secure the Doom Bar bitter brand.

Rock has been referred to as 'Britain's Saint-Tropez' and the 'Kensington of Cornwall' due to its popularity with affluent holidaymakers. The Daily Telegraph has also called it Chelsea-on-Sea and stated that David Cameron's favourite beer is brewed there.

Affluent visitors such as the late Mohamed Al-Fayed and Jay Kay of Jamiroquai would often arrive by helicopter.
