= List of hills of Cornwall =

This is a list of hills in Cornwall based on data compiled in various sources, but particularly the Database of British and Irish Hills, Jackson's More Relative Hills of Britain and the Ordnance Survey 1:25,000 Explorer and 1:50,000 Landranger map series.

Many of these hills are important historic, archaeological and nature conservation sites, as well as popular hiking and tourist destinations in the county of Cornwall in southwest England.

== Colour key ==
Class	Prominence
Marilyns	150 – 599 m
HuMPs	100 – 149 m
TuMPs	30 – 99 m
Unclassified	0 – 29 m

The table is colour-coded based on the classification or "listing" of the hill. The three types that occur in Cornwall are Marilyns, HuMPs and TuMPs, listings based on topographical prominence. "Prominence" correlates strongly with the subjective significance of a summit. Peaks with low prominences are either subsidiary tops of a higher summit or relatively insignificant independent summits. Peaks with high prominences tend to be the highest points around and likely to have extraordinary views. A Marilyn is a hill with a prominence of at least 150 metres or about 500 feet. A "HuMP" (the acronym comes from "Hundred Metre Prominence) is a hill with a prominence of at least 100 but less than 150 metres. In this table Marilyns are in beige and HuMPs in lilac. The term "sub-Marilyn" or "sub-HuMP" is used, e.g. in the online Database of British and Irish Hills to indicate hills that fall just below the threshold. To qualify for inclusion, hills must either be 300 metres or higher with a prominence of at least 30 metres, below 300 metres with a prominence of at least 90 metres (the threshold for a sub-HuMP) or be in some other way notable. For further information see the Lists of mountains and hills in the British Isles and the individual articles on Marilyns and HuMPs. In this context, a "TuMP" is a hill with a prominence of at least 30 but less than 100 metres; by way of contrast, see also the article listing Tumps (a traditional term meaning a hillock, mound, barrow or tumulus).

== List of hills ==
Hill	Height (m)	Prom. (m)	Grid ref.	Class	Parent	Range/Region	Remarks	Image
Brown Willy	420	314	SX158799	Marilyn	High Willhays	Bodmin Moor	Cornwall's county top. Highest of Cornwall's 5 Marilyns.	
Rough Tor	400	87	SX145807	TuMP	Brown Willy	Bodmin Moor	Bodmin Moor's second highest summit. Site of tor cairn and historic settlements and monuments.	
Kilmar Tor	396	118	SX252748	HuMP	Brown Willy	Bodmin Moor	Tor 50m SW of summit trig point	
Stowe's Hill	381	78	SX257724	TuMP	Brown Willy	Bodmin Moor	Massive tor enclosure (Stowe's Pound) and site of the Cheesewring	
Langstone Downs	379	33	SX255738	TuMP	Brown Willy	Bodmin Moor	Large ancient cairn at summit. S of Kilmar Tor	
Caradon Hill	371	69	SX272707	TuMP	Brown Willy	Bodmin Moor	Caradon Hill transmitting station, former mining area	
The Beacon (Hendra Downs)	369	91	SX196792	TuMP, sub-HuMP	Brown Willy	Bodmin Moor	Outcrop near fence is the summit.	
Tolborough Tor	348	42	SX175778	TuMP	Brown Willy	Bodmin Moor	Outcrop at the summit.	
Bray Down	346	54	SX189821 (est.)	TuMP	Brown Willy	Bodmin Moor	Small cheesewring at the summit.	
Buttern Hill	346	48	SX174816	TuMP	Brown Willy	Bodmin Moor	Mound is near Bronze Age chamber tomb.	
Newel Tor	346	62	SX236741	TuMP	Brown Willy	Bodmin Moor	Leaning rock slab at summit.	
Brown Gelly	342	74	SX196727	TuMP	Brown Willy	Bodmin Moor	Tor, hut circles, barrows and cairns.	
Kit Hill	334	171	SX374713	Marilyn	Brown Willy	Cornish Killas	One of Cornwall's five Marilyns Highest point in Cornwall outside Bodmin Moor	
Ridge	331	44	SX242777	TuMP	Brown Willy	Bodmin Moor	Rock on south edge of summit plateau.	
Garrow Tor	330	57	SX374713	TuMP	Brown Willy	Bodmin Moor	Several tors and extensive Bronze Age and Medieval settlements, hut circles, etc.	
Hawk's Tor, North Hill	329	36	SX253763	TuMP	Brown Willy	West Bodmin Moor	Rock tor at summit. No trig point.	
Leskernick Hill	329	36	SX183803	TuMP	Brown Willy	Bodmin Moor	Summit is grassy mound near pool.	
Fox Tor	323	35	SX226785	TuMP	Brown Willy	Bodmin Moor	Summit is a rocky tor, 20 metres SW of trig point.	
Butter's Tor	316	34	SX154783	TuMP	Brown Willy	Bodmin Moor	Outcrop at summit.	
Louden Hill	315	32	SX137803	TuMP	Brown Willy	Bodmin Moor	Flat granite plinth at summit.	
Hensbarrow Beacon	312	193	SW996575	Marilyn	Brown Willy	Hensbarrow	One of Cornwall's five Marilyns Summit dominated by spoil heaps of china clay mine	
Condolden Barrow Condolden	308	50	SX090872	TuMP		Cornish Killas	Summit trig point, Bronze Age barrows Second highest point in Cornwall outside Bodmin Moor	
Hawk's Tor, Blisland	307	61	SX143763	TuMP	Brown Willy	East Bodmin Moor	Summit is the outcrop next to the trig point. Site of Stripple stones, stone circle, Hawkstor Pit SSSI	
Brockabarrow Common	306	31	SX160747	TuMP	Brown Willy	Bodmin Moor	Pile of boulders at summit.	
Alex Tor	291	30	SX118787	TuMP		Bodmin Moor	Summit tor cairn	
Hingston Down	268	47	SX409714 (est.)	TuMP		Tamar Valley	There is a tumulus, a transmission tower and various buildings around the summit	
Carnmenellis	252	165	SW695364	Marilyn	Hensbarrow Beacon	Carnmenellis	One of Cornwall's five Marilyns Summit trig point	
Watch Croft	252	225	SW420357	Marilyn	Brown Willy	West Penwith	One of Cornwall's five Marilyns; Trig point nr summit	
Carn Marth	235	60	SW715408	TuMP		Carnmenellis	Site of former granite quarry	
Carn Brea	228	47	SW683407	TuMP		Carnmenellis	Neolithic and Iron Age settlement	
Castle Downs	216	67	SW945623	TuMP		Cornish Killas	Site of major Iron Age fort: Castle an Dinas	
Trink Hill	212	62	SW504371 (est.)	TuMP	Watch Croft	West Penwith	Trig point and mound at summit.	
Helman Tor	210	37	SX062615	TuMP		Hensbarrow	Tor, nature reserve, logan stone, prehistoric hillfort and stone hut circle	
Bin Down	203	101	SX276578	HuMP	Kilmar Tor	Cornish Killas	Tall man-made mound on summit On Looe Golf Course by 7th tee.	
Carn Kenidjack	202	~25	SW388329	Unclassified		West Penwith	Open hilltop, subpeak is Wheal Bal Hill with a transmission tower.	
Chapel Carn Brea	198	30	SW386280	TuMP		West Penwith	Hercynian granite outcrop; westernmost hill in Britain; site of old chapel, beacon.	
Tregonning Hill	194	102	SW599300	HuMP	Carnmenellis	Cornish Killas	Summit trig point	
Prospidnick Hill	162	~10	SW654312	Unclassified		Cornish Killas	Open summit; wood on SW hillside.	
Brea Hill	62	41	SW928771	TuMP		Cornish Killas	Bronze Age tumuli at summit	

== See also ==
- List of mountains and hills of the United Kingdom
- List of Marilyns in England
- Geography of Cornwall
