= Leskernick Hill =

Hill in Cornwall, England

Leskernick Hill is on Bodmin Moor in Cornwall, UK. It is 329m high and has grid reference SX183803. Leskernick Hill is within the Cornwall AONB (Area of Outstanding Natural Beauty) as part of Area 12: Bodmin Moor in the parish of Altarnun. It lies in an area of moorland that is common land. Its parent hill is Brown Willy and it is within sight of Rough Tor and other local tors

== Archaeological sites of Leskernick ==
On the south and western slopes of Leskernick Hill are 2 Bronze Age settlements, with associated field enclosures, small cairns, a cist and a propped stone, all of which were designated in October 2019 by Historic England as Scheduled Monument 1464798. It is described in the Cornwall County Council Historic Environment Record as "an extraordinarily well preserved Bronze Age settlement comprising at least 44 round houses set within a very extensive field system covering approximately 21 hectares. The site is located on the extremely stony south-west facing slopes of Leskernick Hill. The surface stones are known as “clitter”, a feature common to the granite outcrops of the South West and associated with geological processes taking place on the fringes of glaciated areas during transitional phases of the Ice Age. As the surrounding areas are relatively stone-free, the siting of the settlement in this area is assumed to be deliberate."

Associated with the Leskernick settlement site are 2 stone circles and a stone row/alignment in the valley below:

- Leskernick South Stone Circle - Scheduled Monument 1459490. "The circle consists of 23 granite stones set in a circle of approximately 30m diameter"
- Leskernick North Stone Circle - Scheduled Monument 1460916. "The stone circle comprises a recumbent stone (4m long) a little north of the circle’s centre with 25 stones in an almost-perfect circle approximately 23m in diameter£
- Leskernick Stone Alignment - Scheduled Monument 1461019. "The alignment is 317m long and comprises 47 small, low, square-topped stones, all except two lying, and mostly less than 0.5m high. There are three large recumbent stones at the western terminal. The stones are fairly evenly-spaced, 4m to 5m apart"

The stones of the circles and row were re-exposed in 2016, as they had become overgrown with turf. The work was undertaken by the Time Seekers Clearance Group volunteers, under the supervision of Historic England's area Heritage At Risk Officer. As part of their work, the volunteers recommended the three sites were designated as Scheduled Monuments, which was completed in October 2019. As described by the volunteers:

"From the very moment we arrived at Leskernick we felt we were in a special place – a place of wonder and great importance. It is enclosed by a series of hills, ridges and tors in all directions and just shouts out that importance. The landscape is breathtaking. To stand on the top of Leskernick Hill you can’t help but feel that you are in the centre of a world that was once a Kingdom - an enclosed world - with only a hint or speculation of a possible world beyond. The Beacon, Tolborough Tor, Catshole Tor, Brown Willy, Rough Tor, Showery Tor, High Moor, Buttern Hill, Bray Down, and Carne Down all lock you in - and beyond in the distance, Brown Gelly."

== Archaeological Research at Leskernick ==
Between 1995 and 1999, Barbara Bender, Sue Hamilton and Christopher Tilley directed a changing group of UCL students in the landscape investigation of the late Neolithic and Bronze Age archaeological sites on, and near, Leskernick Hill, with associated archaeological excavations. Named the Leskernick Project, this took an experimental approach to develop new techniques for post processual interpretative archaeology, with a focus on the phenomenology - the lived sensory experience - of the archaeological landscape

== Selected publications ==
- Barnatt, J,1982. Prehistoric Cornwall: The Ceremonial Monuments. Turnstone Press Limited. ISBN 0-85500-129-1
- Johnson, R. and Rose, P, 1994. Bodmin Moor: An Archaeological Survey. Vol.1: The human landscape to c1800. English Heritage. ISSN 0953-3796.
- Bender, B, Hamilton, S., and Tilley, C. 1997. Leskernick: Stone worlds, alternative narratives, nested landscapes. Proceedings of the Prehistoric Society 63: 147–178. doi:10.1017/S0079497X00002413 https://www.researchgate.net/publication/273030093
- Herring, P, 1997. Early Prehistoric Sites at Leskernick, Altarnun in Cornish Archaeology 36 pp176–185
- Hamilton, S., Tilley, C. and Bender, B. 1999. Bronze Age stone worlds of Bodmin Moor: excavating Leskernick. Archaeology International 3: 13–17.
- Hamilton, S., Harrison, S., and Bender, B. 2008. "Conflicting Imaginations: Archaeology, Anthropology and Geomorphology on Leskernick Hill, Bodmin Moor, Southwest Britain." Geoforum 39 (2): 602–15.
- Bender, B., Hamilton, S., and Tilley, C. 2016. Stone Worlds: Narrative and Reflexivity in Landscape Archaeology. London: Routledge
- Seager Thomas, M. 2011. Excavating on the Moor. Artefact Services Research Papers 1. https://archive.org/details/asrp1excavatingonthemoor

== See also ==
- Barbara Bender
- Sue Hamilton
- Christopher Tilley
- Bodmin Moor
- Cornish Bronze Age
- Cornwall Area of Outstanding Natural Beauty
- Hills of Cornwall
