= Geography of Cornwall =

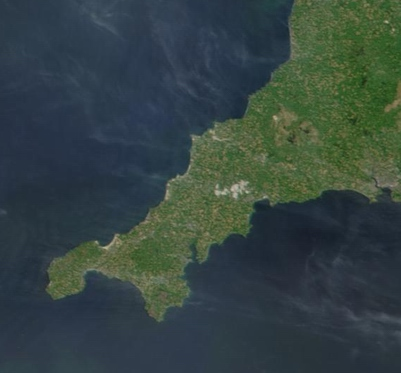
Geography of Cornwall
Continent	Europe
Island	Great Britain
Coordinates	50.3°N 4.9°W
Area	Ranked 9th out of 82 counties 3,563 km^{2} (1,376 mi^{2})
Coastline	697 km (422 mi)
Highest point	Brown Willy; 420 m (1,378 ft)
Lowest point	Sea level
Longest river	River Tamar (border); 94 km (58 mi); River Camel (within Cornwall); 50 km (31 mi)
Largest lake	The Loe

The geography of Cornwall (Cornish: Doronieth Kernow) describes the extreme southwestern peninsula of England west of the River Tamar. The population of Cornwall is greater in the less extensive west of the county than the east due to Bodmin Moor's location; however the larger part of the population live in rural areas. It is the only county in England bordered by only one other county, Devon, and is the 9th largest county by area, encompassing 3,563 km^{2} (1,376 mi^{2}). The length of the coast is large in proportion to the area of the county. Cornwall is exposed to the full force of the prevailing south-westerly winds that blow in from the Atlantic Ocean. To the north is the Celtic Sea, and to the south the English Channel.

Cornwall is the location of Great Britain's most southerly point, The Lizard, and the southern mainland's most westerly point, Land's End. A few miles further west are the Isles of Scilly.

== Physical geography ==
Cornwall is located at 50.5°N 5°W. The highest point is Brown Willy at 420 m (1,378 ft), part of the granite Bodmin Moor, of which such intrusions are covered by rough grass, heather and bog flora. Woodland is prevented from growing on the granite uplands because of the poor soil and the height giving them the full force of the wind and climate. The rest of the inland contains pastureland and arable farmland. The coastline, at 697 km (422 mi), is mostly occupied by high cliffs, but also featuring islets, stacks, coves and bays. Lowland stretches are also to be found, particularly along the south coast, sometimes backed by large expanses of towans or dunes such as near Par. The Isles of Scilly are the largest archipelago in the British Isles outside Scotland. The largest other islands are off the south coast: Looe Island and St Michael's Mount.

The sea to the north of Cornwall is the Celtic Sea; before the usage of Celtic Sea it was part of the Bristol Channel. On Joel Gascoyne's map of 1699 this part of the Atlantic Ocean was named "The North Sea or Severn Channel".

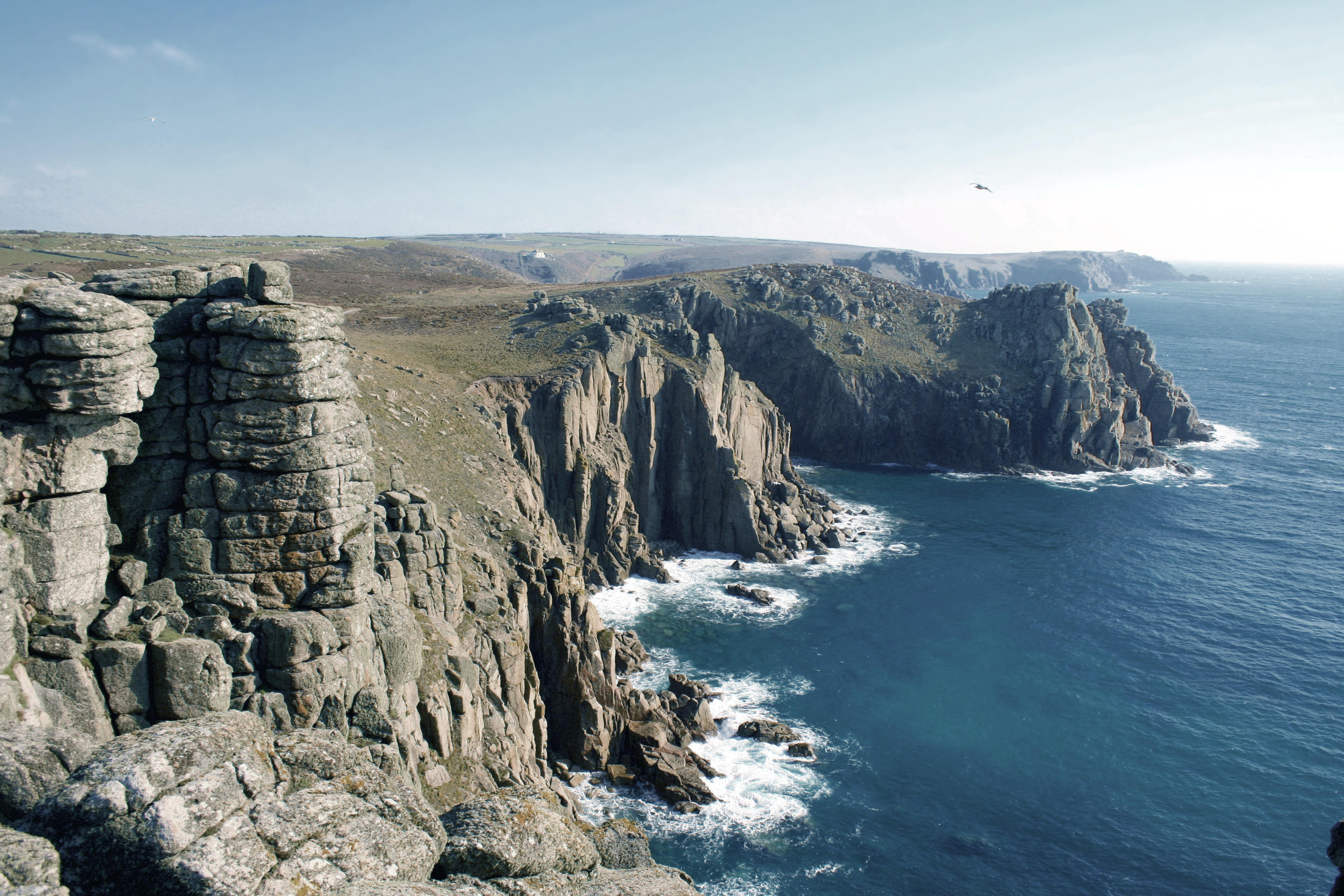
Land's End

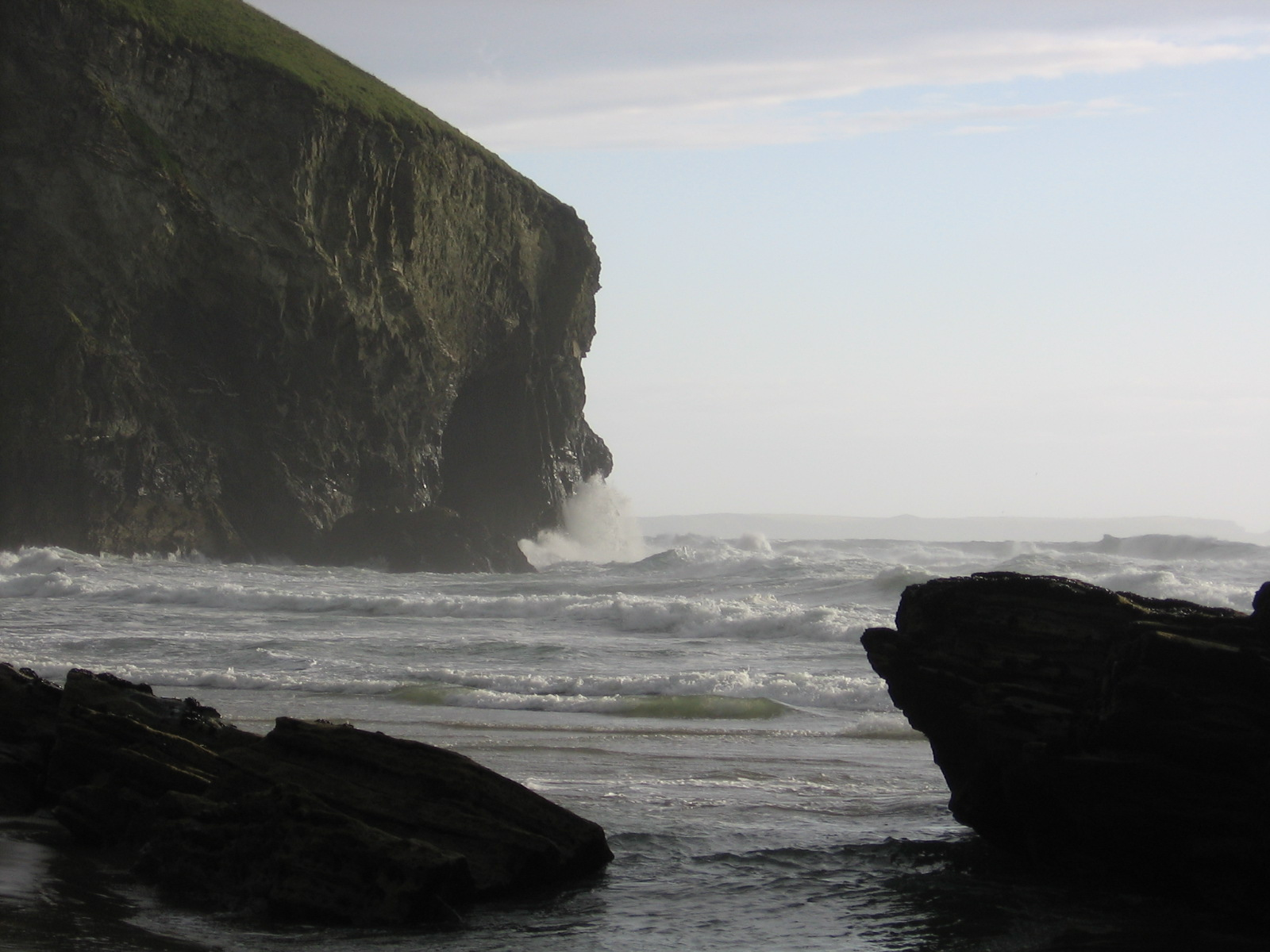
Rough seas off Trebarwith Strand on the north coast

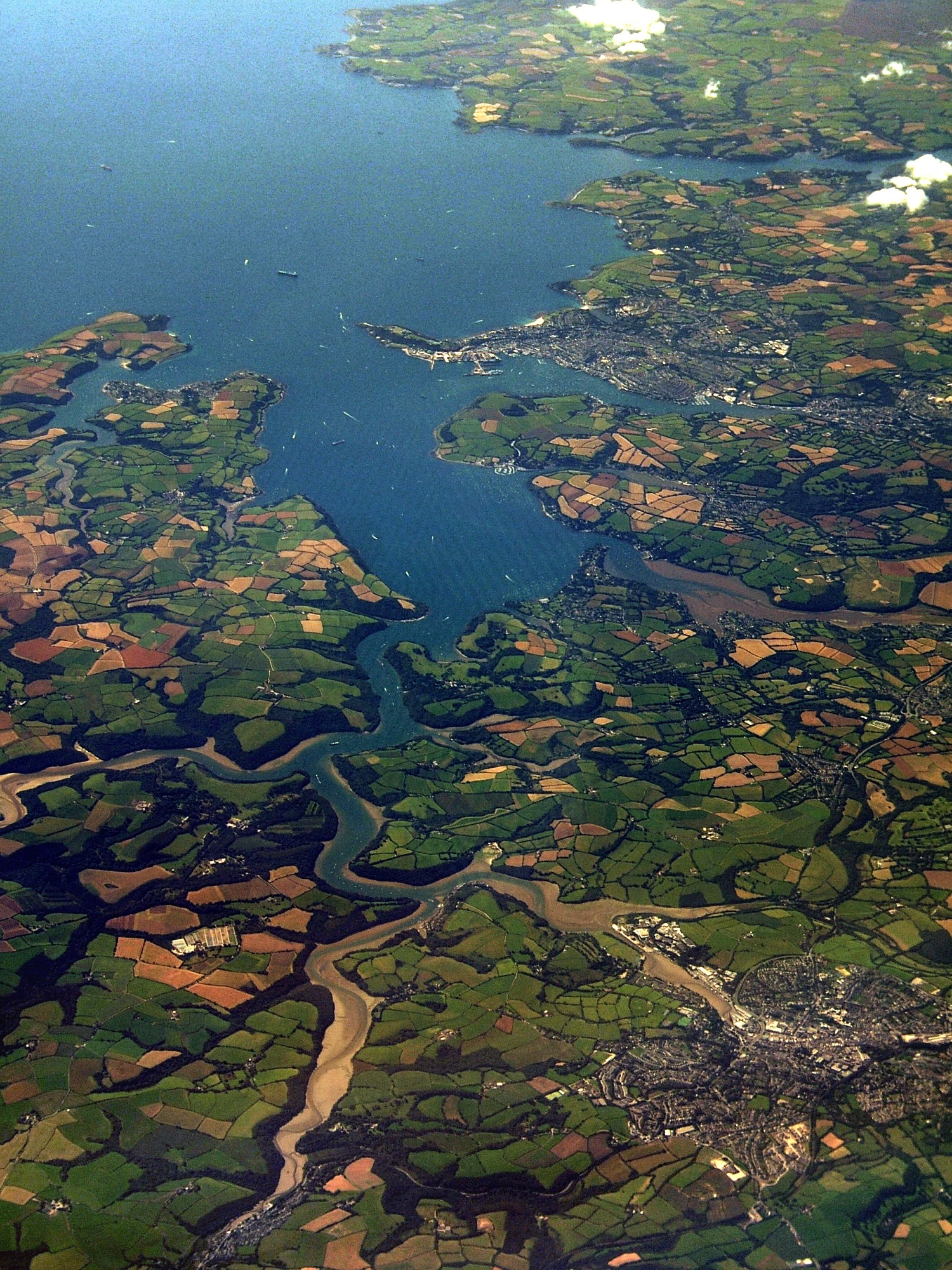
An aerial view of Carrick Roads

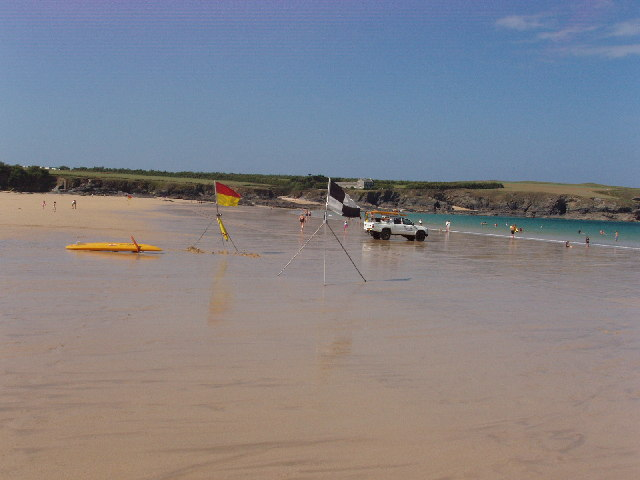
Harlyn Bay

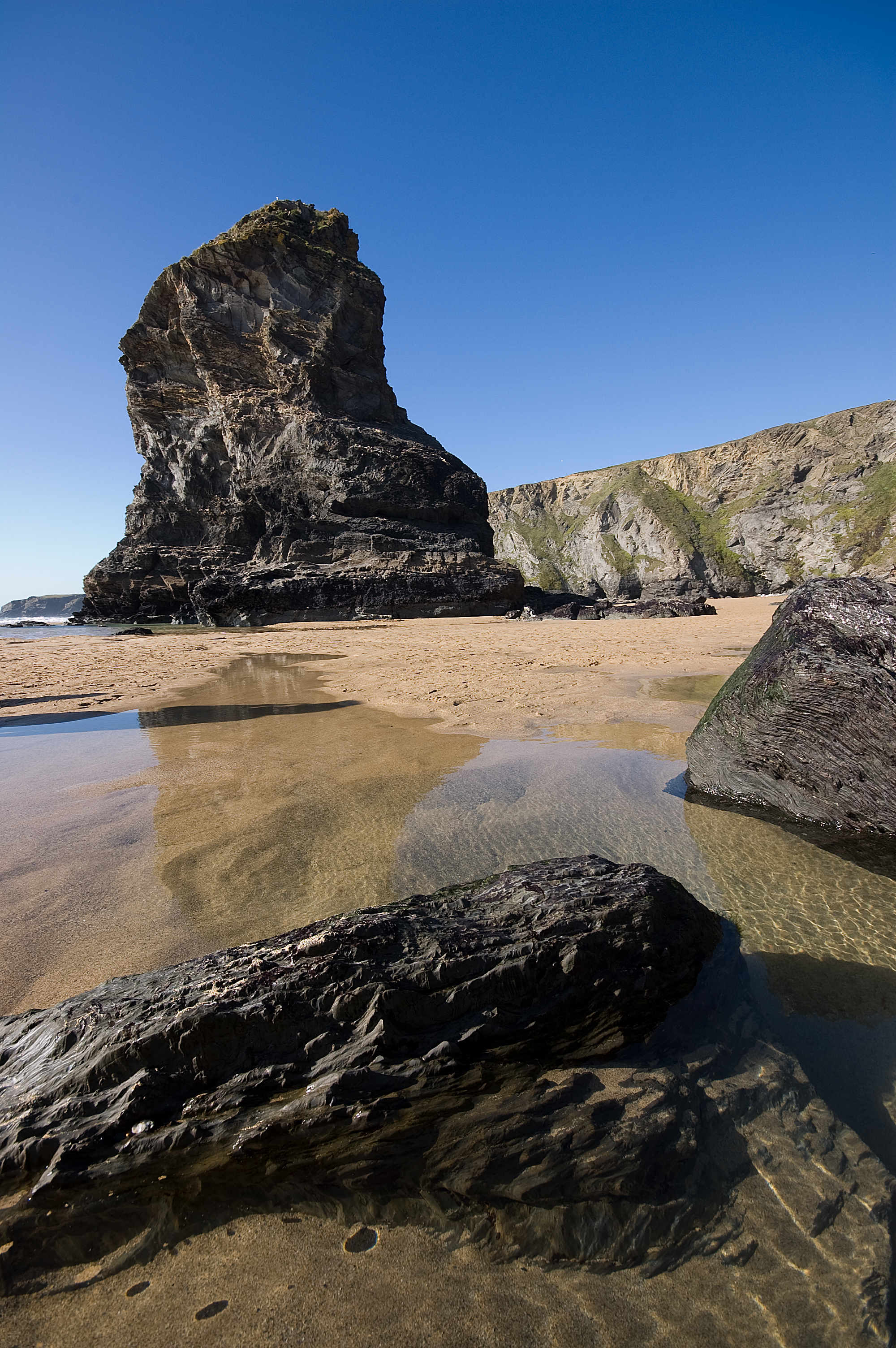
Low tide at Bedruthan Steps

Cornwall was one of the most important mining areas in Europe until the 20th century, due to its intrusions of granite into surrounding sedimentary rocks which resulted in metamorphism and mineralisation. Bodmin Moor and Carn Brea are examples of such granite intrusion. The Lizard peninsula is an example of an ophiolite.

The north coast is more exposed to the prevailing winds from the Atlantic Ocean than the south coast and is more rugged, with many sheer cliffs and steep valleys. The south coast is more sheltered and is interrupted by several rias which provide deep water harbours such as Carrick Roads.

Cornwall has varied habitats including terrestrial and marine ecosystems. One of the lower plant forms in decline locally is the Reindeer lichen, which has been made a priority for protection under the national UK Biodiversity Action Plan.

=== National character areas ===
The national character areas recognised by Natural England that lie wholly or partially on Cornish soil are:

- The Culm – NCA 149
- Cornish Killas – NCA 152
- Bodmin Moor – NCA 153
- Hensbarrow – NCA 154
- Carnmenellis – NCA 155
- West Penwith – NCA 156
- The Lizard – NCA 157
- Isles of Scilly – NCA 158
- Lundy – NCA 159

== Human geography ==
One of the oldest maps still in existence depicting Cornwall is the 1290 Hereford Mappa Mundi currently on display in Hereford Cathedral in the United Kingdom. Many maps of the British Isles prior to the 17th century showed Cornwall (Cornubia/Cornwallia/Kernow) as a nation on a par with Wales and examples include the maps of Sebastian Münster, Abraham Ortelius, and Girolamo Ruscelli. After the 17th century, maps of Cornwall tended to no longer make the distinction between Anglia and Cornubia, the British Sea was renamed the English Channel and Cornwall as a separate entity was omitted from the maps.

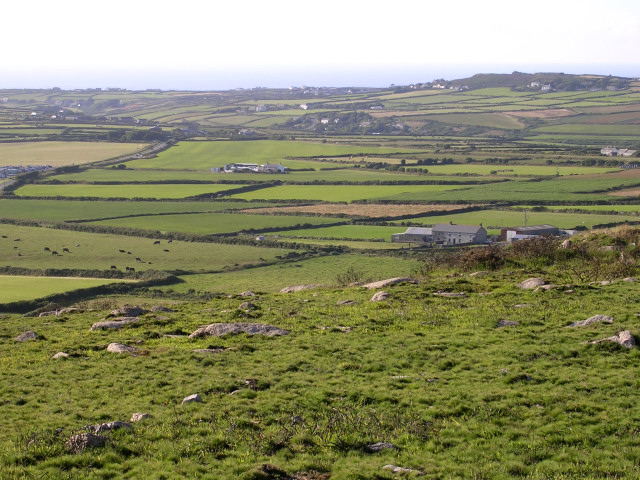
The view northwest from Carn Brea, Penwith

From 1889 to March 2009 Cornwall was administered by Cornwall County Council; the second level of local government included municipal boroughs, urban districts and rural districts, and within each of these were a number of civil parishes. Cornwall consisted from April 1974 to March 2009 of six districts, which are, from west to east: Penwith, Kerrier, Carrick, Restormel, North Cornwall, and Caradon. While traditionally administered as part of Cornwall, the Isles of Scilly are now a separate unitary authority though they are included in the ceremonial county. Natural resources include: granite, slate, tin, copper and kaolinite. Agricultural land: 73.64%; Woodland cover: 7.5%; Other types: 18.86%. The deposits of tin, copper and kaolinite were heavily exploited during the 19th and 20th centuries. Some species of fish are abundant in the coastal waters; the pilchard fishery was of great importance from the late 18th to the early 20th century.

Camborne is the county's largest town and more populous than the capital Truro. Together with the neighbouring town of Redruth, it forms the largest urban area in Cornwall, and both towns were significant as centres of the global tin mining industry in the 19th century; nearby copper mines were also very productive during that period. St Austell is also larger than Truro and was the centre of the china clay industry in Cornwall. Until four new parishes were created for the St Austell area on 1 April 2009 St Austell was the largest settlement in Cornwall.

== Climate ==
Cornwall has a temperate oceanic climate (Köppen climate classification: Cfb), with mild winters and cool summers, and hot and very cold weather are rare. Cornwall has the mildest and sunniest climate in the United Kingdom, as a result of its oceanic setting and the influence of the Gulf Stream. The average annual temperature in Cornwall ranges from 11.6 °C (53 °F) on the Isles of Scilly to 9.8 °C (50 °F) in the central uplands. Winters are amongst the warmest in the country, due to the moderating effects of the warm ocean currents, and frost and snow are very rare at the coast and are also rare in the central upland areas. Summers are, however, not as warm as those of other areas in southern England. The surrounding sea and its southwesterly position mean that Cornwall's weather is relatively changeable.

Cornwall is one of the sunniest areas in the UK, with over 1541 hours of sunshine per year, with the highest average of 7.6 hours of sunshine per day in July. The moist, mild air coming from the south west brings higher amounts of rainfall than in eastern Great Britain, at 1051 to 1290 mm (41.4 to 50.8 in) per year, though not as much as in more northern areas of the west coast. The Gulf Stream moderates the climate of Cornwall enough that Cornwall's weather is distinctly milder than other places in the world at the same latitude, such as Newfoundland. The mild climate has resulted in a number of botanical gardens, such as Trebah and the Lost Gardens of Heligan.

The Isles of Scilly, for example, is the warmest place in the whole of Great Britain with an average temperature of 11.6 °C, where there are on average less than two days of air frost per year, are in the USDA Hardiness zone 10, which is thus the only area in the UK that is in this zone. However, compared to most other climates in zone 10, Scilly has cool summers. In Scilly there is on average less than one day of air temperature exceeding 30 °C per year and it is in the AHS Heat Zone 1. Pendennis Point in Falmouth is the warmest place on mainland Great Britain, with an average temperature of 11.4 °C (52.5 °F).

Extreme temperatures in Cornwall are particularly rare; however, extreme weather in the form of storms and floods is common. The Shipping Forecast areas bordering on Cornwall are Lundy (north coast) and Plymouth (south coast).

On 24 June 2026, a dew point of 24.9 °C (76.8 °F) was recorded at Cardinham, the highest ever recorded in the United Kingdom.

=== Temperature tables ===
Climate data for Bude
Month	Jan	Feb	Mar	Apr	May	Jun	Jul	Aug	Sep	Oct	Nov	Dec	Year
Mean daily maximum °C (°F)	9 (48)	9 (48)	10 (50)	12 (54)	16 (61)	18 (64)	20 (68)	20 (68)	19 (66)	15 (59)	12 (54)	10 (50)	14 (57)
Mean daily minimum °C (°F)	4 (39)	3 (37)	4 (39)	5 (41)	8 (46)	10 (50)	14 (57)	13 (55)	11 (52)	9 (48)	6 (43)	5 (41)	8 (46)
Source: Weather Channel

Climate data for Helston
Month	Jan	Feb	Mar	Apr	May	Jun	Jul	Aug	Sep	Oct	Nov	Dec	Year
Mean daily maximum °C (°F)	9 (48)	9 (48)	10 (50)	12 (54)	15 (59)	17 (63)	19 (66)	20 (68)	18 (64)	15 (59)	11 (52)	9 (48)	13 (55)
Mean daily minimum °C (°F)	4 (39)	4 (39)	5 (41)	6 (43)	8 (46)	11 (52)	13 (55)	14 (57)	11 (52)	9 (48)	6 (43)	5 (41)	8 (46)
Source: Weather Channel

Climate data for Isles of Scilly, Cornwall
Month	Jan	Feb	Mar	Apr	May	Jun	Jul	Aug	Sep	Oct	Nov	Dec	Year
Mean daily maximum °C (°F)	10 (50)	9 (48)	11 (52)	12 (54)	14 (57)	17 (63)	19 (66)	19 (66)	18 (64)	16 (61)	13 (55)	11 (52)	14.1 (57.4)
Mean daily minimum °C (°F)	7 (45)	6 (43)	7 (45)	8 (46)	9 (48)	12 (54)	13 (55)	14 (57)	13 (55)	11 (52)	9 (48)	8 (46)	9.7 (49.5)
Average precipitation mm (inches)	91 (3.6)	71 (2.8)	69 (2.7)	46 (1.8)	56 (2.2)	49 (1.9)	61 (2.4)	64 (2.5)	67 (2.6)	80 (3.1)	96 (3.8)	94 (3.7)	844 (33.2)
Average precipitation days	22	17	16	13	14	14	16	15	16	17	19	21	200
Mean monthly sunshine hours	61	83	135	186	229	229	238	225	164	121	77	57	1,805
Source: Climate Data for Isles of Scilly

Climate data for Liskeard
Month	Jan	Feb	Mar	Apr	May	Jun	Jul	Aug	Sep	Oct	Nov	Dec	Year
Mean daily maximum °C (°F)	8 (46)	8 (46)	9 (48)	12 (54)	14 (57)	18 (64)	20 (68)	20 (68)	19 (66)	15 (59)	11 (52)	9 (48)	14.5 (58.1)
Mean daily minimum °C (°F)	4 (39)	3 (37)	4 (39)	5 (41)	8 (46)	11 (52)	13 (55)	14 (57)	11 (52)	9 (48)	7 (45)	5 (41)	9 (48)
Source: Weather Channel

Climate data for Truro, Cornwall
Month	Jan	Feb	Mar	Apr	May	Jun	Jul	Aug	Sep	Oct	Nov	Dec	Year
Mean daily maximum °C (°F)	8 (46)	8 (46)	10 (50)	12 (54)	15 (59)	18 (64)	19 (66)	20 (68)	18 (64)	15 (59)	12 (54)	9 (48)	14 (57)
Mean daily minimum °C (°F)	5 (41)	4 (39)	5 (41)	6 (43)	8 (46)	11 (52)	13 (55)	14 (57)	12 (54)	10 (50)	7 (45)	6 (43)	8 (47)
Average precipitation mm (inches)	81 (3.2)	63 (2.5)	49 (1.9)	54 (2.1)	40 (1.6)	47 (1.9)	48 (1.9)	51 (2.0)	57 (2.2)	87 (3.4)	87 (3.4)	78 (3.1)	742 (29.2)
Source: Foreca

== Natural hazards ==
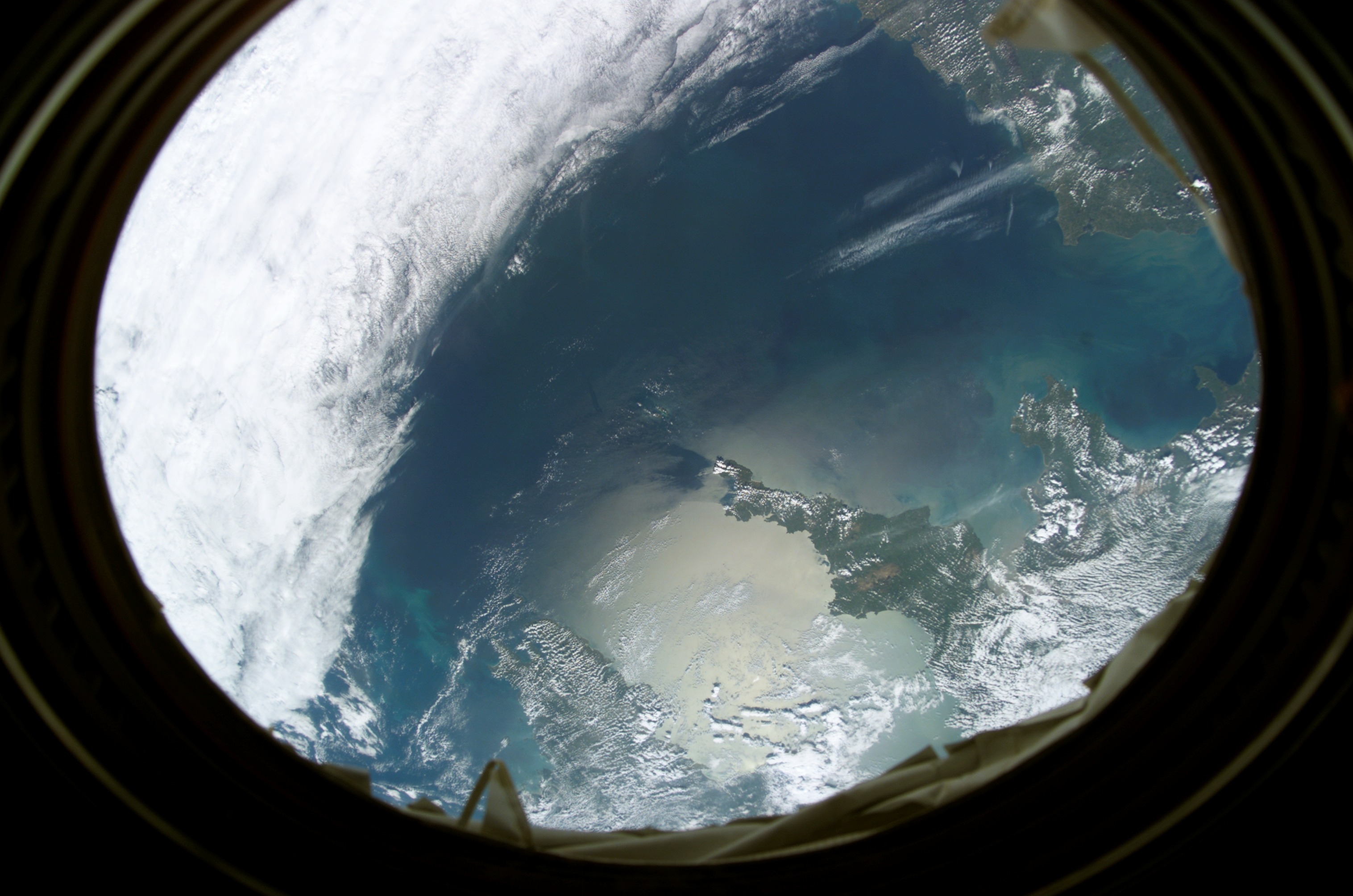
Cornwall seen from the International Space Station

Cornwall is not known for being prone to natural hazards, although they do happen. The county experiences droughts and heat waves with the rest of Europe as they happen, but its location close to the ocean dampens their severity. Also, European windstorms in the winter usually make landfall on the west coast of Europe, including Cornwall, resulting in severe gales and flooding. Cornwall's many valleys also make it prone to rapid flooding when an unusually heavy amount of rainfall occurs, as seen in the Boscastle flood of 2004.

Although not lying on any plate boundary, Britain occasionally experiences intraplate tremors as a result of the Eurasian Plate's motion, reactivating weak points in the rock. The west coast is more prone to these tremors than the east. The strongest tremor so far recorded in Cornwall was in 1815, measuring 4.4 on the Richter scale with its epicentre near Penzance.

The 1755 earthquake in Lisbon, Portugal which measured 9.0 on the Richter scale sent a tsunami towards the south coast of Cornwall. Historical accounts describe the waves of 3 metres (10 feet) in height and significant loss of life and property.

== See also ==
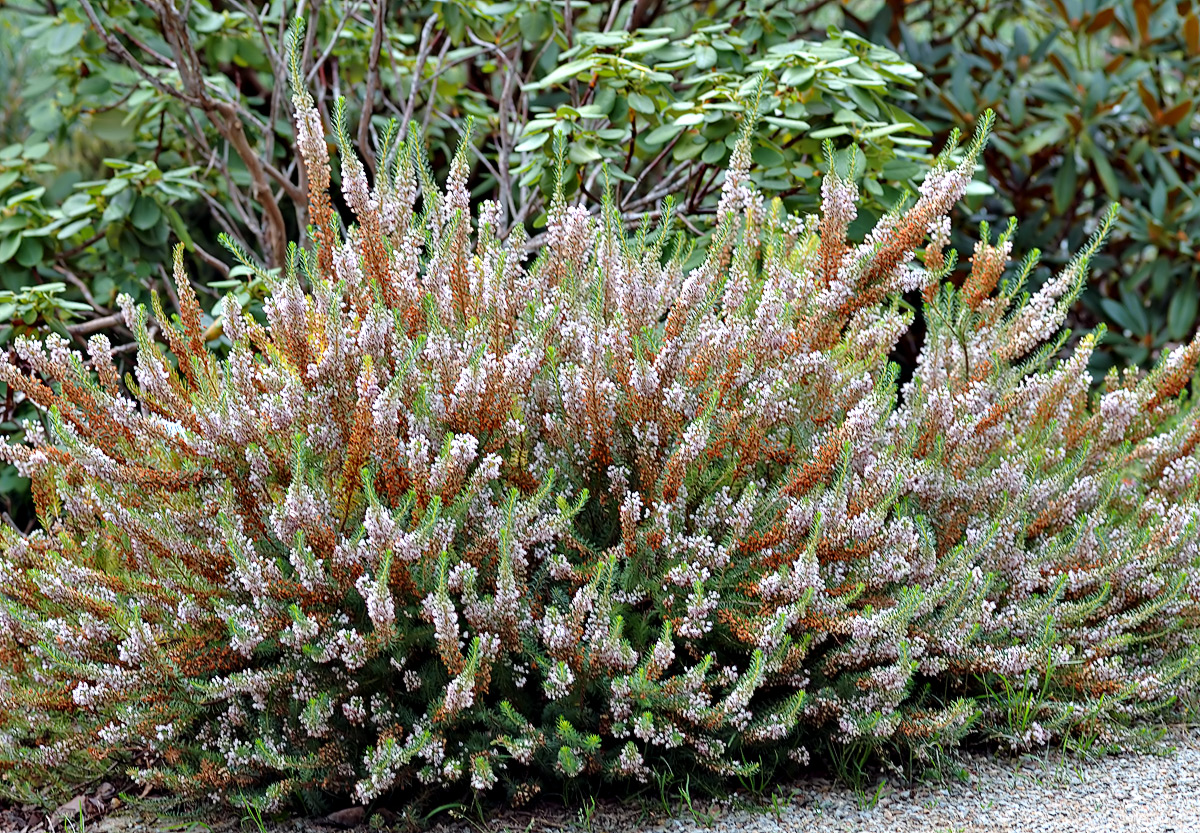
Cornish heath

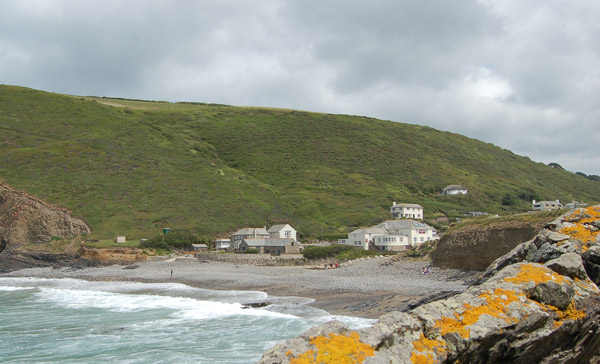
Crackington Haven seen across the beach in 2005

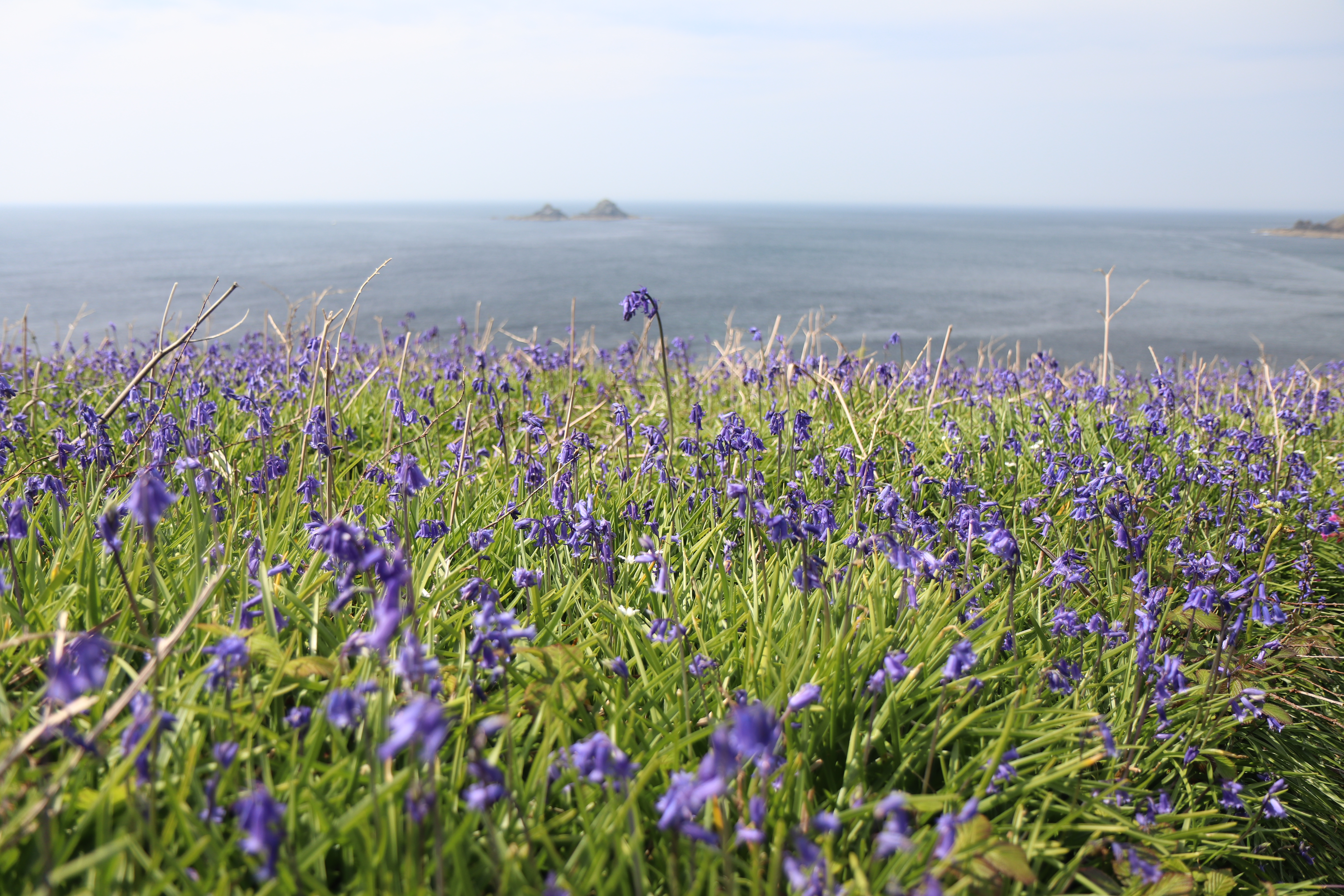
Bluebells on the Cornish coast

- Flora and fauna of Cornwall
- List of hills of Cornwall
- List of Special Areas of Conservation in Cornwall
