= Helen Nash =

Helen Nash may refer to:

- Helen Elizabeth Nash (1921–2012), first African-American doctor at the Saint Louis Children's Hospital
- Helen Nash (cellist), cellist for the electric string quartet Escala
