= Caradon (disambiguation) =

Caradon may refer to:

- Caradon - a local government district in Cornwall, United Kingdom.
- Caradon Hill - a geographic location in Cornwall, United Kingdom.
- Caradon Hill transmitting station - a telecommunications facility on Caradon Hill.
- Caradon plc - the company founded in 1985 that merged with Metal Box, and eventually became Novar plc, which itself was taken over by Honeywell in 2005.
- Hugh Foot, Baron Caradon - the British politician (Lord Caradon from 1964).
- Liskeard and Caradon Railway, a mineral line closed in 1917
