= Siblyback Lake =

Reservoir in Cornwall, England

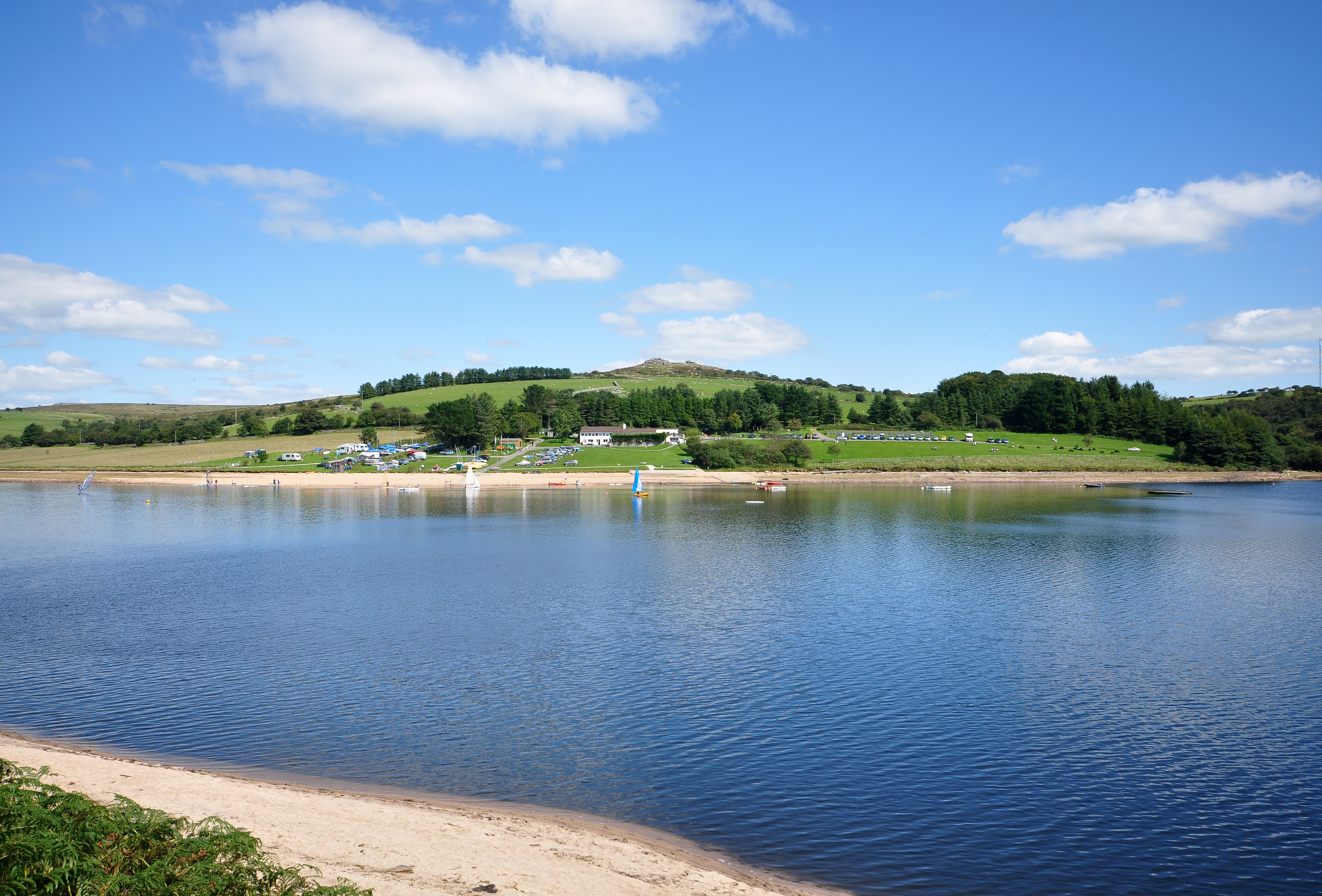
- Siblyback Lake watersports centre

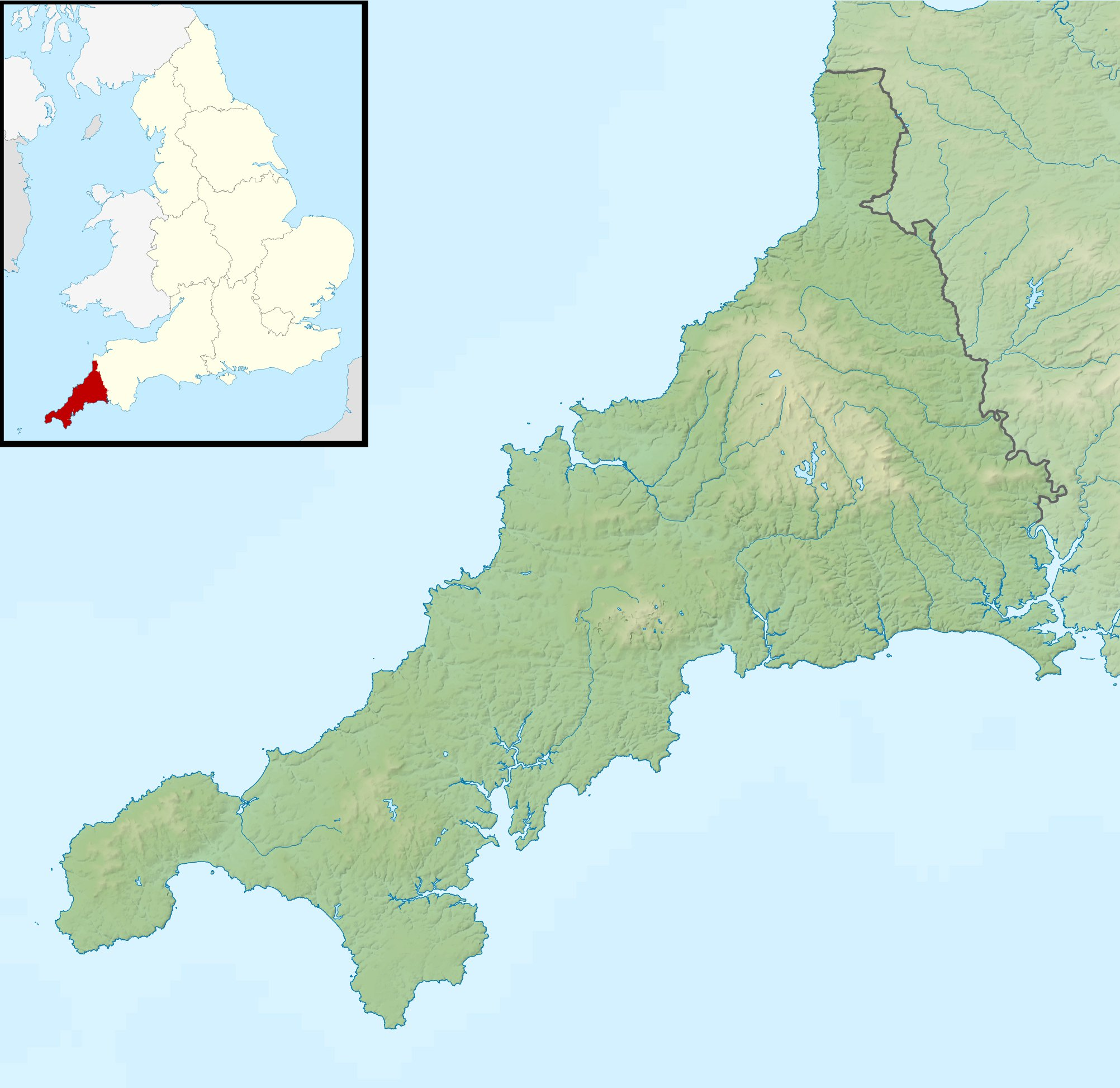
- Location within Cornwall Location within the United Kingdom
- Interactive map of Siblyback Lake
- Location: Bodmin Moor, Cornwall, England
- Coordinates: 50°30′40″N 4°29′35″W
- Type: Reservoir
- Primary outflows: River Fowey
- Catchment area: 794 hectares (1,960 acres)
- Basin countries: United Kingdom
- Managing agency: South-West Lakes Trust
- Designation: Protected
- Built: 1968
- Surface area: 56 hectares (140 acres)
- Average depth: 5.8 metres (19 ft)
- Water volume: 3 billion litres (660,000,000 imp gal; 790,000,000 US gal)
- Surface elevation: 225 metres (738 ft)
- References: U.S. Environmental Protection Agency: National Assessment Database Siblyback Lake

Siblyback Lake is a reservoir on the edge of Bodmin Moor in Cornwall, England, UK.

It is one of 12 areas in Cornwall designated as an Area of Outstanding Natural Beauty. and is managed by the South-West Lakes Trust.

The dam blocks a small tributary of the River Fowey. It was built in 1968 and at full capacity the lake holds over 3 billion litres of water. The reservoir is used to buffer the water levels in the River Fowey in the summer. The water is collected downstream for domestic drinking water at the Restormel treatment works.

In addition to watersports facilities, a 3.2-mile (5.1 km) circular path runs adjacent to the lake.

The lake has a resident population of brown trout and is regularly stocked with rainbow trout and blue trout.

== Gallery ==
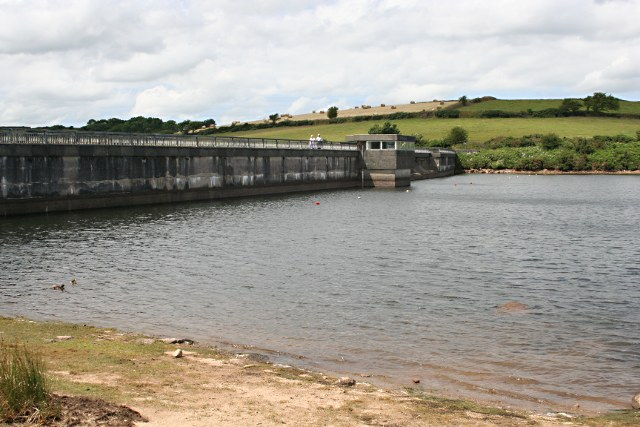
Siblyback Lake dam

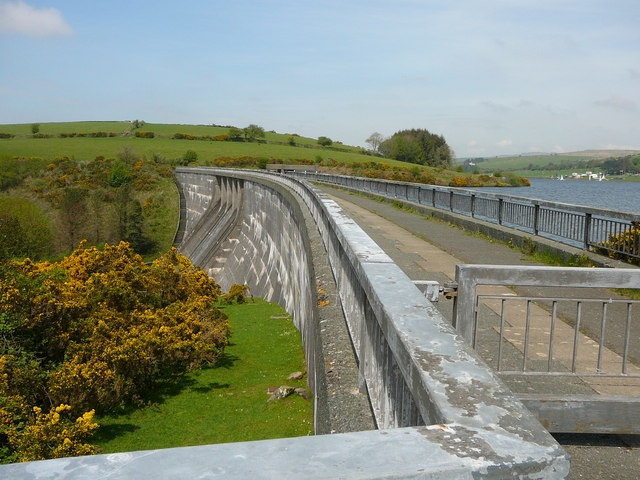
Siblyback Lake dam
