= Tor enclosure =

Type of prehistoric monument found in southwestern Great Britain

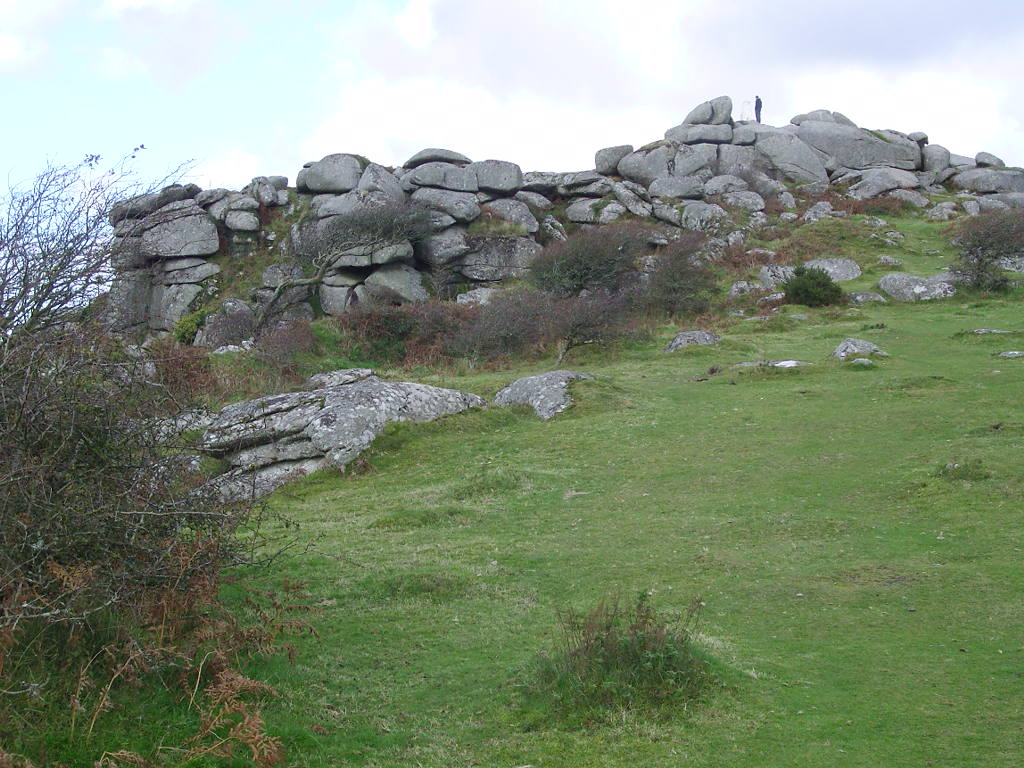
Helman Tor in Cornwall

A tor enclosure is a type of prehistoric monument found in the southwestern part of Great Britain. These monuments emerged around 4000 BCE in the early Neolithic.

Tor enclosures are large enclosures situated near natural rock outcrops, especially tors, on hilltops or the sides of hills. They consist of one or more roughly circular stone walls built around the tor. They are comparable to the causewayed enclosures found elsewhere in the British Isles and many are of similar Neolithic date although others are from later in prehistory.

== Examples ==
The best known examples are Carn Brea in Cornwall, the first to be identified, following excavations in the early 1970s, and Helman Tor between Bodmin and Lostwithiel also in Cornwall.

Other possible examples are:

- Rough Tor on Bodmin Moor, Cornwall
- Stowe's Hill, also on Bodmin Moor
- Whittor on Dartmoor.

== See also ==
- Tor cairn
