= Kilmar Tor =

Tor on Bodmin Moor, Cornwall, England

Coordinates: 50°32′N 4°28′W

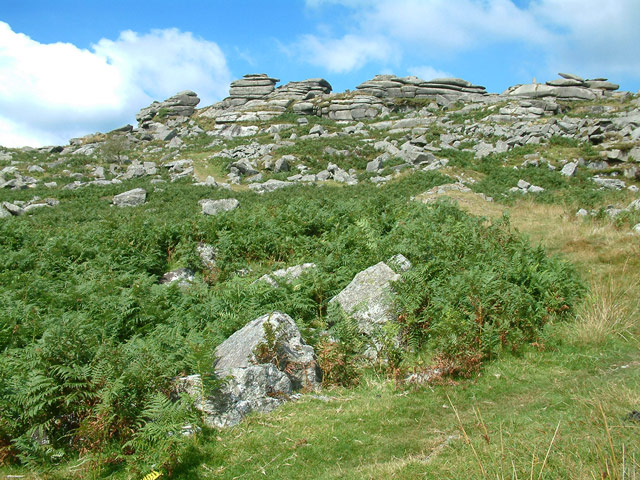
- Kilmar Tor from the SE. Trig point just visible on the right.

Highest point
- Elevation: 396 m (1,299 ft)
- Prominence: 118 m (387 ft)
- Listing: HuMP

Naming
- Native name: Karn Kilmargh (Cornish)

Geography
- Location: Bodmin Moor, Cornwall
- OS grid: SX252748
- Topo map: OS Landranger 201, Explorer 109

Geology
- Mountain type: granite tor

Kilmar Tor (Cornish: Karn Kilmargh) is an elongated hill, 396 metres (1,299 ft) high and running from SW to NE, on Bodmin Moor in Cornwall, England. Its prominence of 118 metres qualifies it as a HuMP.

Kilmar Tor is located on the eastern side of Bodmin Moor, about 2½ kilometres WSW of the hamlet of North Hill and 3½ kilometres north of Cornwall's highest village, Minions. It is surmounted by granite tors. There is trig point at the summit as well as a cairn and cist. The course of a dismantled railway runs around the hill to the south, evidence of the mining that used to be carried out in the area.

On Kilmar Tor's northern flank is Twelve Men's Moor with Trewortha Tor and Hawk's Tor beyond the saddle. To the southeast is Bearah Tor and, to the south, Langstone Downs. Withy Brook runs roughly north to south past the western end of the hill and, to the east, open moorland descends to the valley of the River Lynher.

== Popular culture ==
Kilmar Tor features in Daphne du Maurier's novel Jamaica Inn.
