= Cornish Cowboy =

- Directed by: Gareth Molan
- Produced by: Helen Nash
- Starring: Dan Wilson; Monty Roberts
- Production company: Mister Shark
- Distributed by: Amazon.com
- Release dates: 13 May 2015 (Cannes); 12 April 2017
- Country: United Kingdom
- Language: English

Cornish Cowboy is a 2015 short documentary film featuring Dan Wilson, a Cornish-based horse trainer, trained by Monty Roberts. Directed by Gareth Molan and produced by Helen Nash, the film premiered at the 2015 Cannes Film Festival.

== Plot ==
Based at his ramshackle farm on Bodmin Moor, Cornwall, England, Dan Wilson is a horse trainer, commonly referred to as a 'horse whisperer'. Using his remarkable techniques, Dan breaks in and trains horses where other trainers have tried and failed.

== Release ==
The film premiered during the 2015 Cannes Film Festival and has also been nominated for an award at the 2016 Celtic Media Festival. Amazon released the film in April 2017. In March 2017 a longer version of the film was released titled The Horse Whisperer of Bodmin Moor on Horse and Country TV.
