= Hawk's Tor, Blisland =

Hill and tor on Bodmin Moor, Cornwall, England

Coordinates: 50.5501°N 4.6249°W

Hawk's Tor
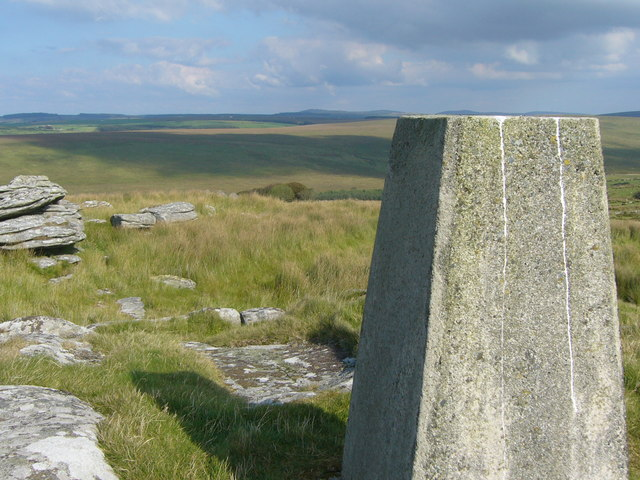
- View from the trig point on Hawk's Tor.

Highest point
- Elevation: 307 m (1,007 ft)
- Prominence: 61 m (200 ft)
- Listing: Tump

Geography
- Location: West Bodmin Moor, Cornwall
- OS grid: SX141755
- Topo map: OS Landranger 200, Explorer 109

Geology
- Mountain type: granite tor

Hawk's Tor is a hill and tor on Bodmin Moor in Cornwall, England, UK. Its summit is 307 metres (1,007 ft) above sea level.

The tor, which is in the civil parish of Blisland, is located 7 miles (11 km) north east of the town of Bodmin. The slopes of the tor contain Hawkstor Downs, the Stripple stones, a stone circle and Hawkstor Pit, which is a Site of Special Scientific Interest noted for its biological interest.

There is another Hawk's Tor (329 m) on Bodmin Moor, further east, near the village of North Hill.

In 2022 the Hawks Tor reservoir, an old clay pit, was bought online by South West Water. Its volume is about 1.5 million cubic metres.
