= Helen Nash (cellist) =

English cellist

- Born: Cornwall, England
- Education: Royal Welsh College of Music and Drama
- Occupation(s): Musician, Producer, Writer
- Years active: 2012–present
- Website: http://www.helenclarenash.com

Helen Nash is the cellist for the electric string quartet Escala.

Nash comes from Cornwall, England.

== Education ==
Nash studied cello at the Royal Welsh College of Music and Drama.

== Career ==
Nash has appeared at Kensington Palace, The Royal Albert Hall, O2 arena, The Royal Variety Performance 2012 and 2013, and others. Nash is a cellist with Escala.

In 2015, Nash became a producer of the film, Cornish Cowboy which premiered at the Cannes Film Festival.

In 2018, Nash is ranked #4 as Cornwall Sexy List 2018.

== Filmography ==
=== Films ===
- 2015 Cornish Cowboy - short. producer.
- 2015 Black Mountain Poets - music composer.
- 2017 The Eighth Wonder - writer and producer.
- 2017 The Horse Whisperer of Bodmin Moor - producer.

=== Television series ===
- 2012 The Royal Variety Performance - as herself.
- 2016 The Royal Variety Performance - as herself.

== See also ==
- List of Royal Variety Performances
