= Brown Gelly =

Hill, tor and ridge on Bodmin Moor, Cornwall, England

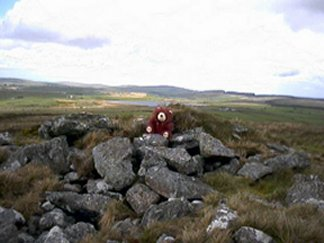
- Brown Gelly Cairn

Highest point
- Elevation: 342 m (1,122 ft)
- Prominence: 74 m (243 ft)
- Parent peak: Brown Willy
- Listing: Tump
- Coordinates: 50°31′27.74″N 4°32′52.21″W

Naming
- Native name: Bronn Gelliow (Cornish)

Geography
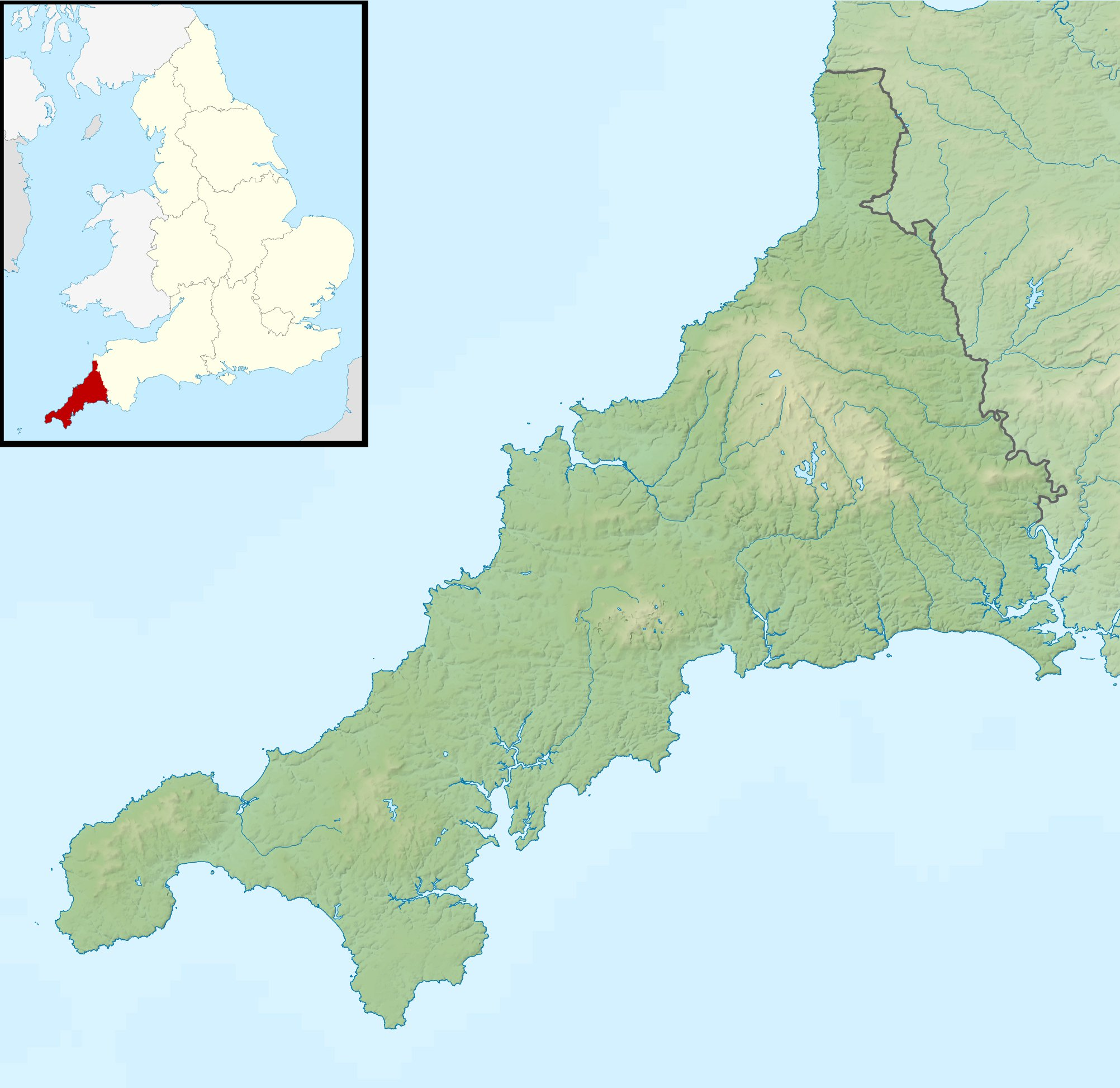
- Location within Cornwall
- Location: Bodmin Moor, Cornwall, England, UK
- OS grid: SX196727
- Topo map: OS Landranger 201

Brown Gelly (Cornish: Bronn Gelliow) is a tor, hill and ridge near Dozmary Pool on Bodmin Moor near Liskeard in Cornwall, UK.

At its foot lies Browngelly Downs, and the area has preserved various remains of hut circles, barrows and cairns. Five cairns are located in a semi-circular arc along the ridge of Brown Gelly. They are prominent from a distance and Christopher Tilley suggests they were intended to be seen as a group from the west and the east in order to "analogically resemble or simulate tors". The tor is made of a granitic rock that has less autogenic alteration than other areas of Bodmin Moor due to some type of local anomaly. Archaeological aerial reconnaissance was carried out over the area in the 1980s which suggested the remains of a prehistoric settlement comprising several dispersed hut circles. These structures have also been called a "barrow group" by John Barnatt Evidence of flint production and tin streaming has also been found in the area that supports the suggestion of an ancient settlement.

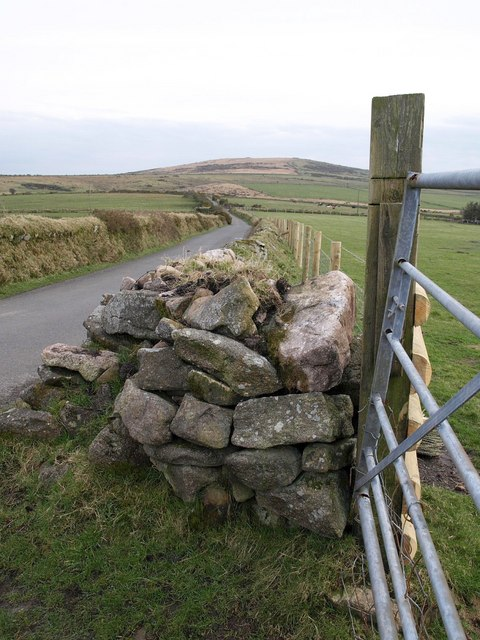
Brown Gelly from Pinnockshill
