= Stowe's Hill =

Hill in England

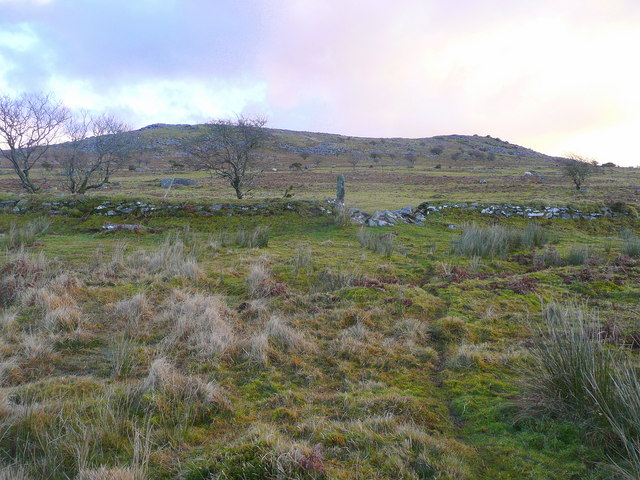
- Stowe's Hill from the west.

Highest point
- Elevation: 381 m (1,250 ft)
- Prominence: 78 m (256 ft)
- Listing: TuMP
- Coordinates: 50.5262°N 4.4593°W

Geography
- Location: Bodmin Moor, England
- OS grid: SX257724
- Topo map: OS Landranger 201, Explorer 109

Geology
- Mountain type: granite tor

Stowe's Hill is an elongated hill, 381 metres (1,250 ft) high, located on the eastern edge of Bodmin Moor in the county of Cornwall, England.

Stowe's Hill is a prominent granite ridge located about 1500 metres north of Minions, the highest village in Cornwall. It is dominated by Stowe's Pound, a huge tor enclosure comprising two massive stone-walls. The smaller enclosure surrounds the tors at the southern end of the hill; the larger one encircles the rest of the ridge. At the southern end is a large, disused quarry, but the hill is best known as the site of the Cheesewring, the extraordinary granite formation that gave the quarry its name.

Inside Stowe's Pound are two Bronze Age cairns, a stone round house and over 100 house platforms. The site is thought to be Neolithic or Bronze Age and connected with other settlements and ritual monuments in the vicinity.
