= Hawk's Tor, North Hill =

Hill in North Hill, Cornwall, England

Coordinates: 50.5613°N 4.4826°W

Hawk's Tor
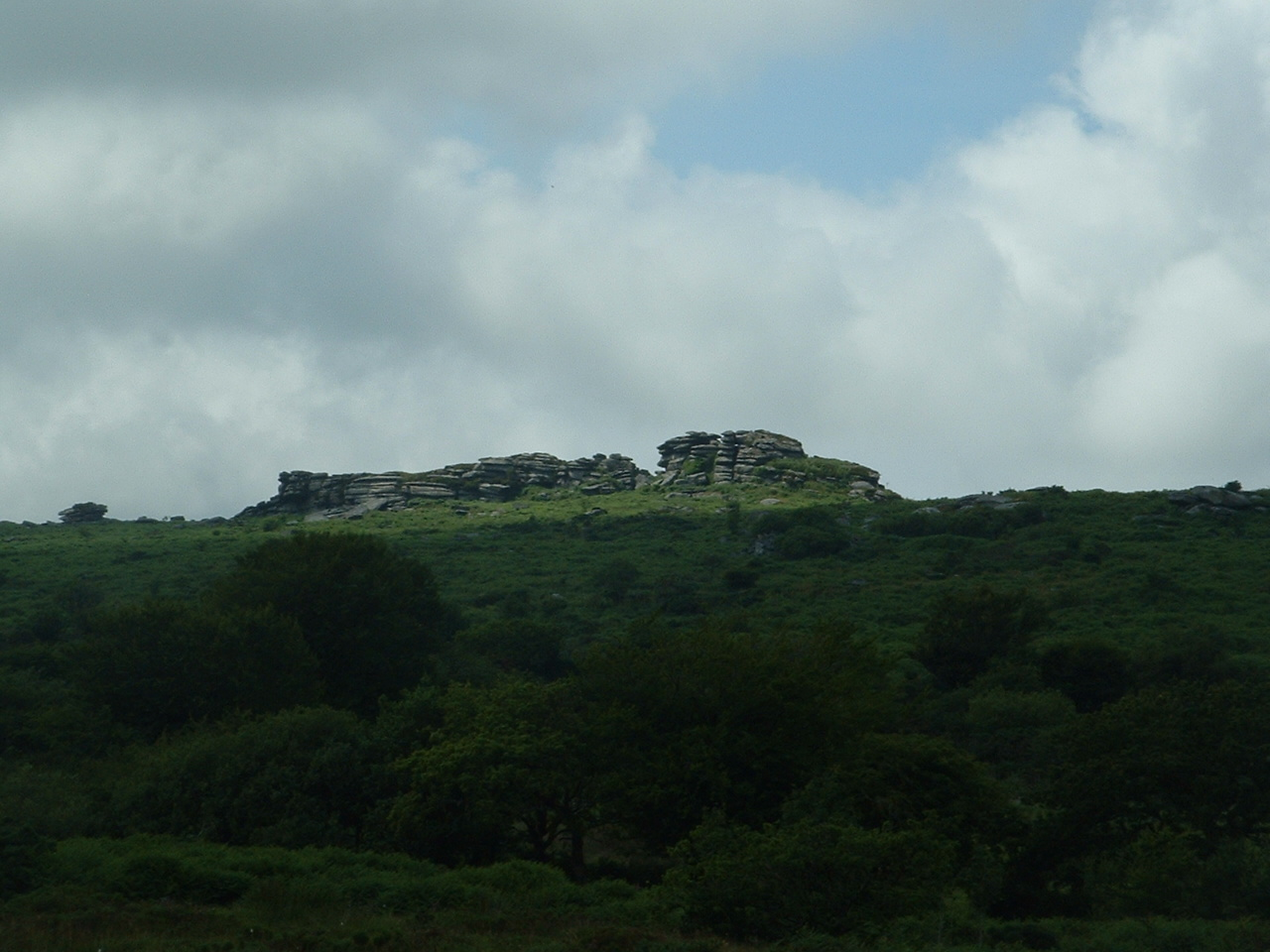
- Hawk's Tor

Highest point
- Elevation: 329 m (1,079 ft)
- Prominence: 36 m (118 ft)
- Listing: Tump

Naming
- Native name: Torr Hok (Cornish)

Geography
- Location: East Bodmin Moor, Cornwall
- OS grid: SX253763
- Topo map: OS Landranger 201, Explorer 109

Geology
- Mountain type: granite tor

Hawk's Tor (Cornish: Torr Hok) is an elongated hill, 329 metres (1,079 ft) high and running from WSW to ENE, on Bodmin Moor in the county of Cornwall, England, UK. It stands opposite the village of North Hill across the valley of the River Lynher.

There is another Hawk's Tor (307 m) on Bodmin Moor, further west, near the village of Blisland.
