= Caradon Hill =

Hill on Bodmin Moor in Cornwall, England

Coordinates: 50.51130°N 4.43667°W

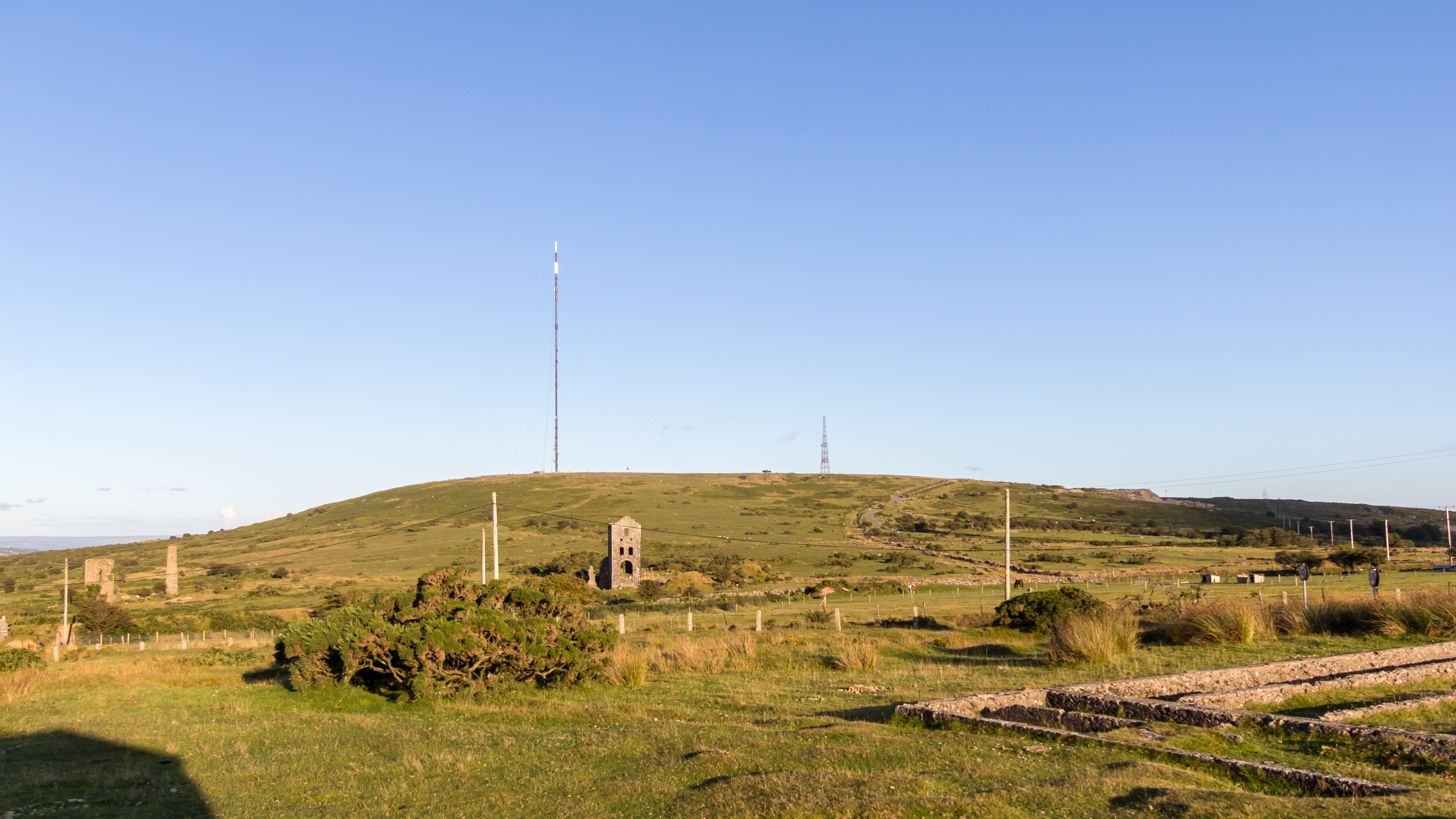
Caradon Hill

Caradon Hill (Cornish: Bre Garn) is on Bodmin Moor in the former Caradon district of Cornwall, England, United Kingdom. The summit is 371 metres (1,217 ft) above mean sea level. Caradon Hill is on the southeastern edge of the moor; it is between the villages of Minions (northwest), Upton Cross (northeast), Pensilva (southeast) and Darite (southwest).

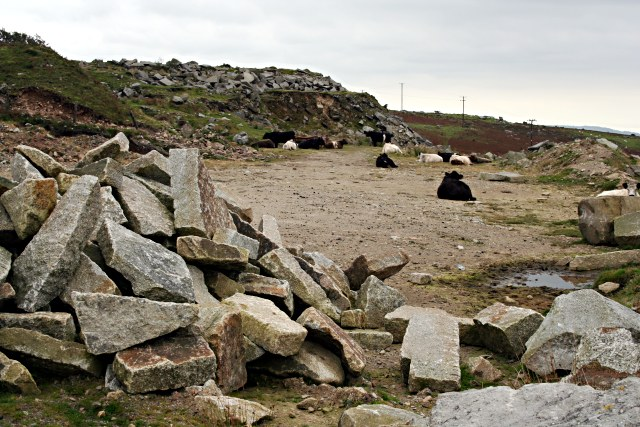
Quarry waste and cattle on Caradon Hill

The hill was once famous for its copper mines but these are now closed. The South Caradon Copper Mine, 1 km to the SW of the transmitter, was the biggest copper mine in the UK in its heyday in the second half of the 19th century. Other disused copper and tin mines are scattered around the base of the hill, including the Wheal Phoenix, well known among mineral collectors. The ruins of the Prince of Wales engine house are prominent at Wheal Phoenix. Granite was also quarried nearby. The mining area around the southwest base of the hill form part of Crow's Nest SSSI (Site of Special Scientific Interest).

The Caradon Hill transmitting station television mast is near the summit of Caradon Hill at grid reference SX 272 707.
