= Bodmin Moor =

Granite moorland in northeast Cornwall, England

Coordinates: 50.5625°N 4.6132°W

Bodmin Moor (Cornish Standard Written Form: Goon Brenn) is a granite moorland in north-eastern Cornwall, England, United Kingdom. It is 208 square kilometres (80 sq mi) in size, and the granite dates from the Permian period of geological history. It includes Brown Willy, the highest point in Cornwall, and Rough Tor, a slightly lower peak. Many of Cornwall's rivers have their sources here. It has been inhabited since at least the Neolithic era, when early farmers started clearing trees and farming the land. They left their megalithic monuments, hut circles and cairns, and the Bronze Age culture that followed left further cairns, and more stone circles and stone rows. By medieval and modern times, nearly all the forest was gone and livestock rearing predominated.

The name Bodmin Moor is relatively recent. An early mention is in the Royal Cornwall Gazette of 28 November 1812. The upland area was formerly known as Fowey Moor after the River Fowey, which rises within it.

== Geology ==
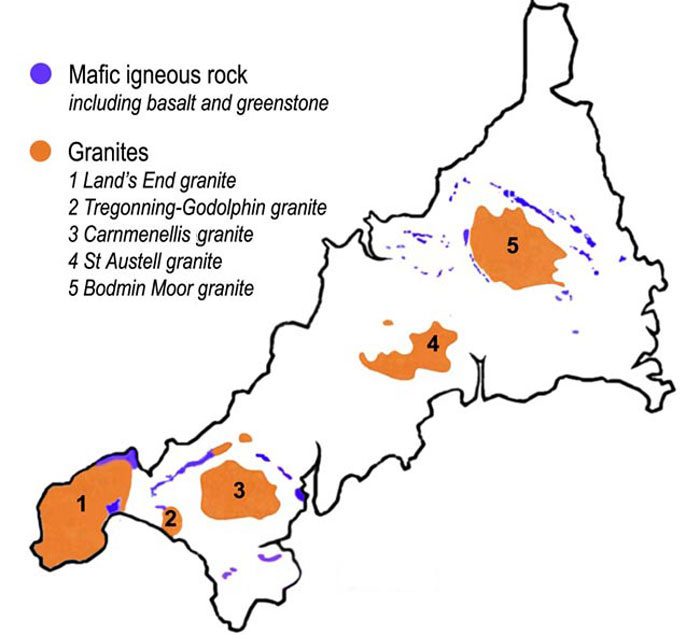
Geological sketch showing Bodmin Moor (5) in relation to Cornwall's granite intrusions

Bodmin Moor is one of five granite plutons in Cornwall that make up part of the Cornubian batholith. The intrusion dates from the Cisuralian epoch, the earliest part of the Permian period, and outcrops across about 190 km^{2} (73 sq mi). Around the pluton's margins where it intruded into Devonian slates, the country rock has been hornfelsed. Numerous peat deposits occur across the moor whilst large areas are characterised by blockfields of granite boulders; both deposits are of Quaternary age: the blockfields are a periglacial feature (i.e. Pleistocene Epoch) while the peat is Holocene age. (see also Geology of Cornwall).

== Geography ==
Dramatic granite tors rise from the rolling moorland: the best known are Brown Willy, the highest point in Cornwall at 417 m (1,368 ft), and Rough Tor at 400 m (1,300 ft). To the south-east Kilmar Tor and Caradon Hill are the most prominent hills. Considerable areas of the moor are poorly drained and form marshes (in hot summers these can dry out). The rest of the moor is mostly rough pasture or covered with heather and other low vegetation.

The moor contains about 500 holdings with around 10,000 beef cows, 55,000 breeding ewes and 1,000 horses and ponies. Most of the moor is a Site of Special Scientific Interest (SSSI), Bodmin Moor, North, and has been designated an Area of Outstanding Natural Beauty (AONB), as part of Cornwall National Landscape. The moor has been identified by BirdLife International as an Important Bird Area (IBA) because it supports about 260 breeding pairs of European stonechats as well as a wintering population of 10,000 Eurasian golden plovers. The moor has also been recognised as a separate natural region and designated as national character area 153 by Natural England.

Institutional landowners within Bodmin Moor, North SSSI include the National Trust, the Ministry of Defence, the Forestry Commission and Highways England.

=== Principal summits ===
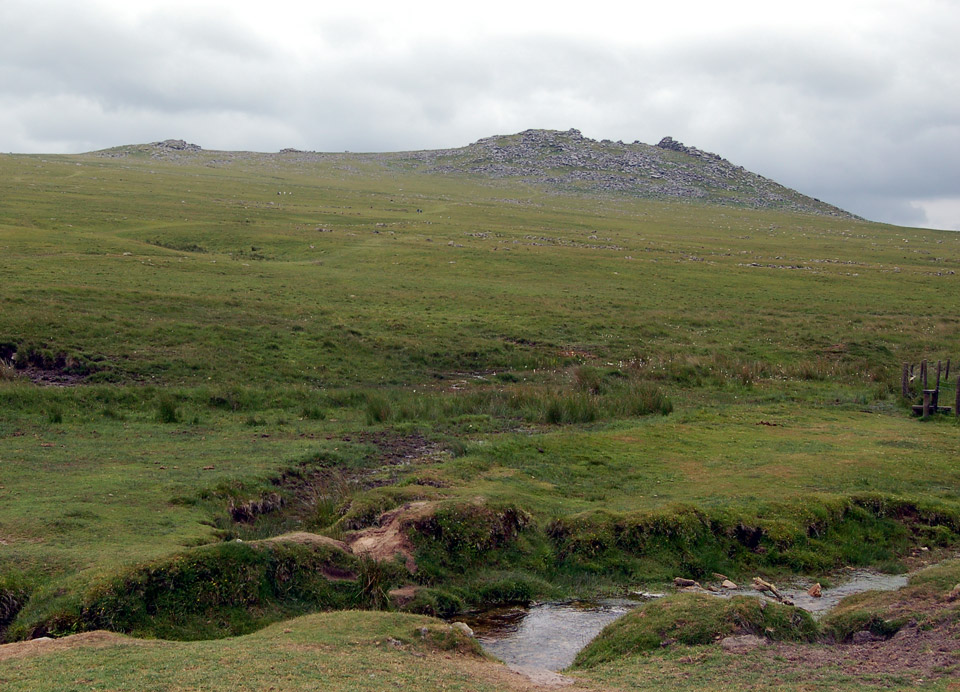
Rough Tor

The following hills in the Bodmin Moor area rise above 300 metres with 30 metres topographic prominence:

1. Brown Willy (420 m (1,380 ft))
2. Rough Tor (400 m (1,300 ft))
3. Kilmar Tor (396 m (1,299 ft))
4. Stowe's Hill (381 m (1,250 ft))
5. Langstone Downs (380 m (1,250 ft))
6. Caradon Hill (371 m (1,217 ft))
7. The Beacon (369 m (1,211 ft))
8. Tolborough Tor (348 m (1,142 ft))
9. Bray Down (346 m (1,135 ft))
10. Buttern Hill (346 m (1,135 ft))
11. Newel Tor (346 m (1,135 ft))
12. Brown Gelly (342 m (1,122 ft))
13. Garrow Tor (331.2 m (1,087 ft))
14. Ridge (331 m (1,086 ft))
15. Hawk's Tor (North Hill) (329 m (1,079 ft))
16. Leskernick Hill (329 m (1,079 ft))
17. Fox Tor (323 m (1,060 ft))
18. Butter's Tor (316 m (1,037 ft))
19. Louden Hill (315 m (1,033 ft))
20. Condolden (307.5 m (1,009 ft))
21. Hawk's Tor (Blisland) (307 m (1,007 ft))
22. Brockabarrow Common (306 m (1,004 ft))

Apart from Caradon Hill, all these summits lie within the Cornwall National Landscape.

=== Rivers and inland waters ===
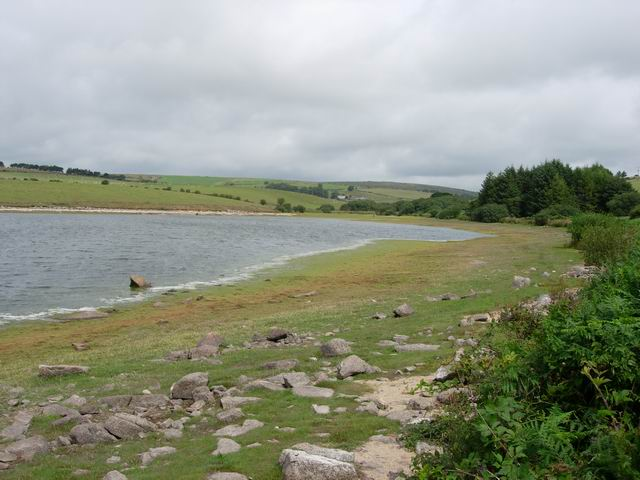
Siblyback Lake

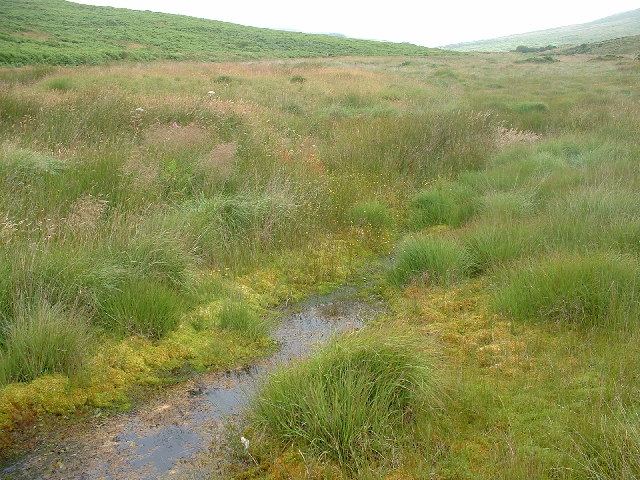
The De Lank River at Garrow Tor

Bodmin Moor is the source of several of Cornwall's rivers: they are mentioned here anti-clockwise from the south.

The River Fowey rises at a height of 290 m (950 ft) and flows through Lostwithiel and into the Fowey estuary.

The River Tiddy rises near Pensilva and flows southeast to its confluence with the River Lynher (the Lynher flows generally south-east until it joins the Hamoaze near Plymouth). The River Inny rises near Davidstow and flows southeast to its confluence with the River Tamar.

The River Camel rises on Hendraburnick Down and flows for approximately 40 km (25 mi) before joining the sea at Padstow. The River Camel and its tributary the De Lank River are an important habitat for the otter, bullhead fish and salmonids, and both have been proposed as Special Areas of Conservation (SAC). The De Lank River rises near Roughtor and flows along an irregular course before joining the Camel south of Wenford.

The River Warleggan rises near Temple and flows south to join the Fowey.

On the southern slopes of the moor lies Dozmary Pool. It is Cornwall's only natural inland lake. In the 20th century three reservoirs have been constructed on the moor; these are Colliford Lake, Siblyback Lake and Crowdy reservoirs, which supply water for a large part of the county's population. Various species of waterfowl are resident around these rivers.

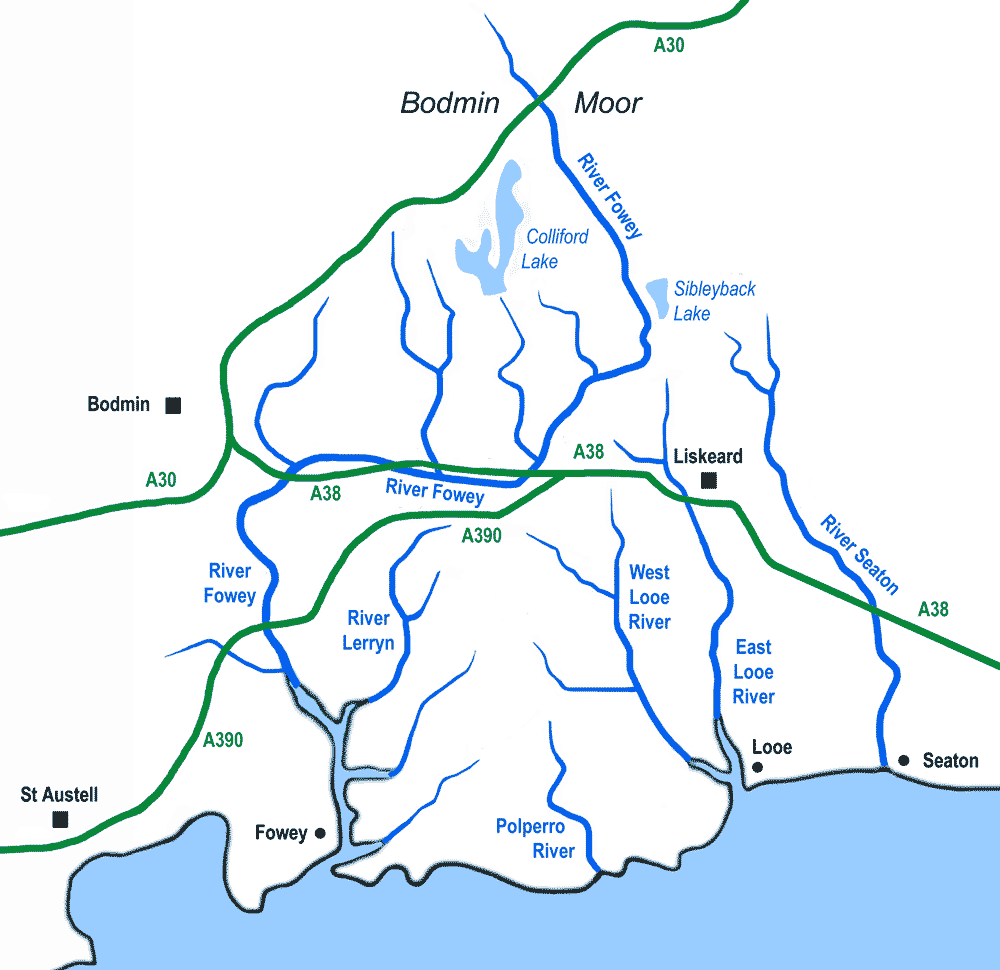
Rivers south of Bodmin Moor

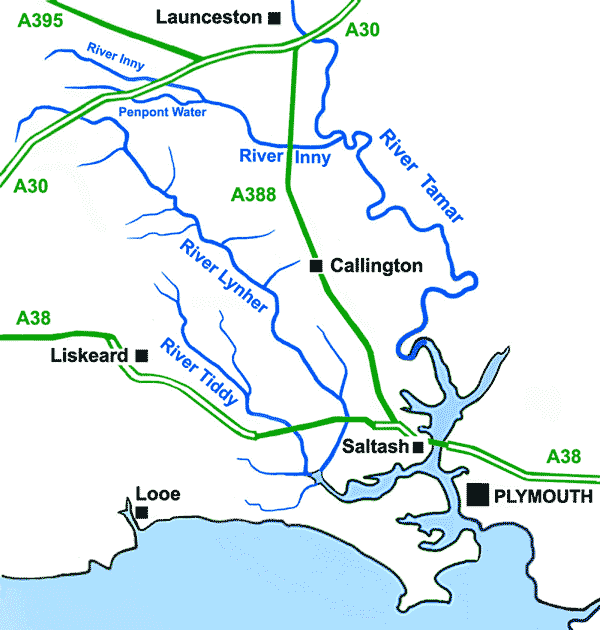
Rivers southeast of Bodmin moor

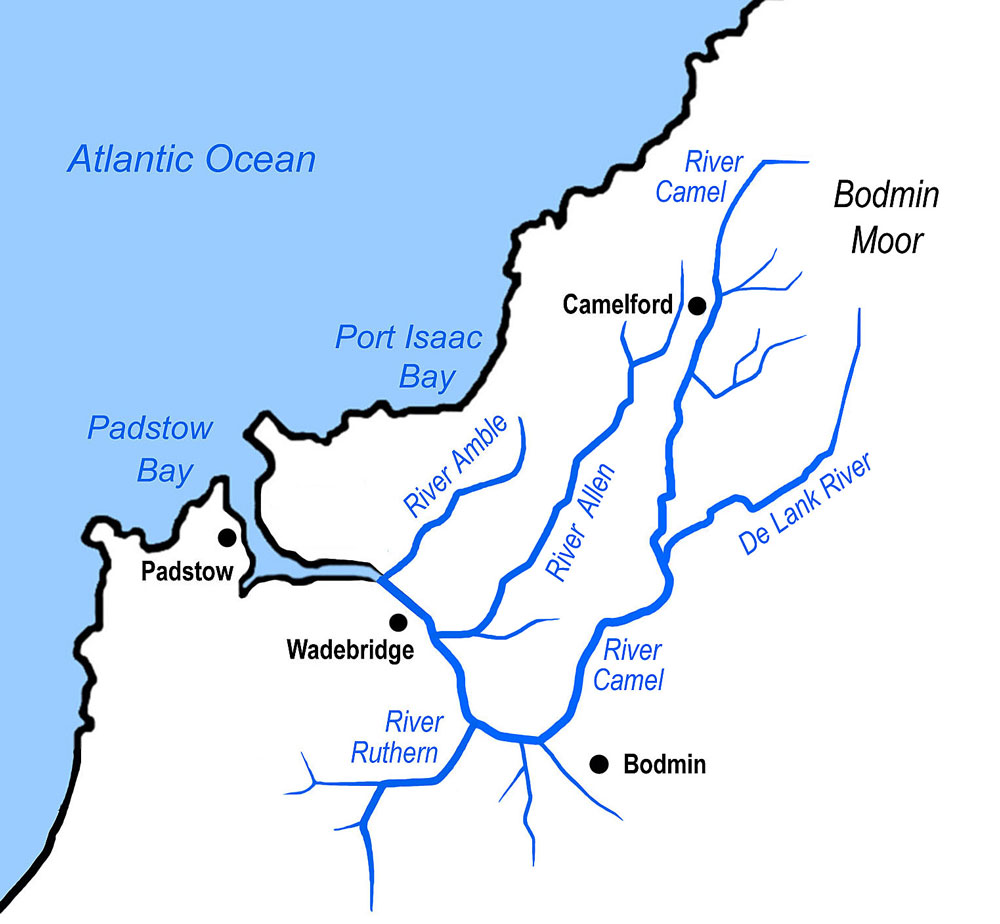
Rivers northwest of Bodmin Moor

== Parishes ==
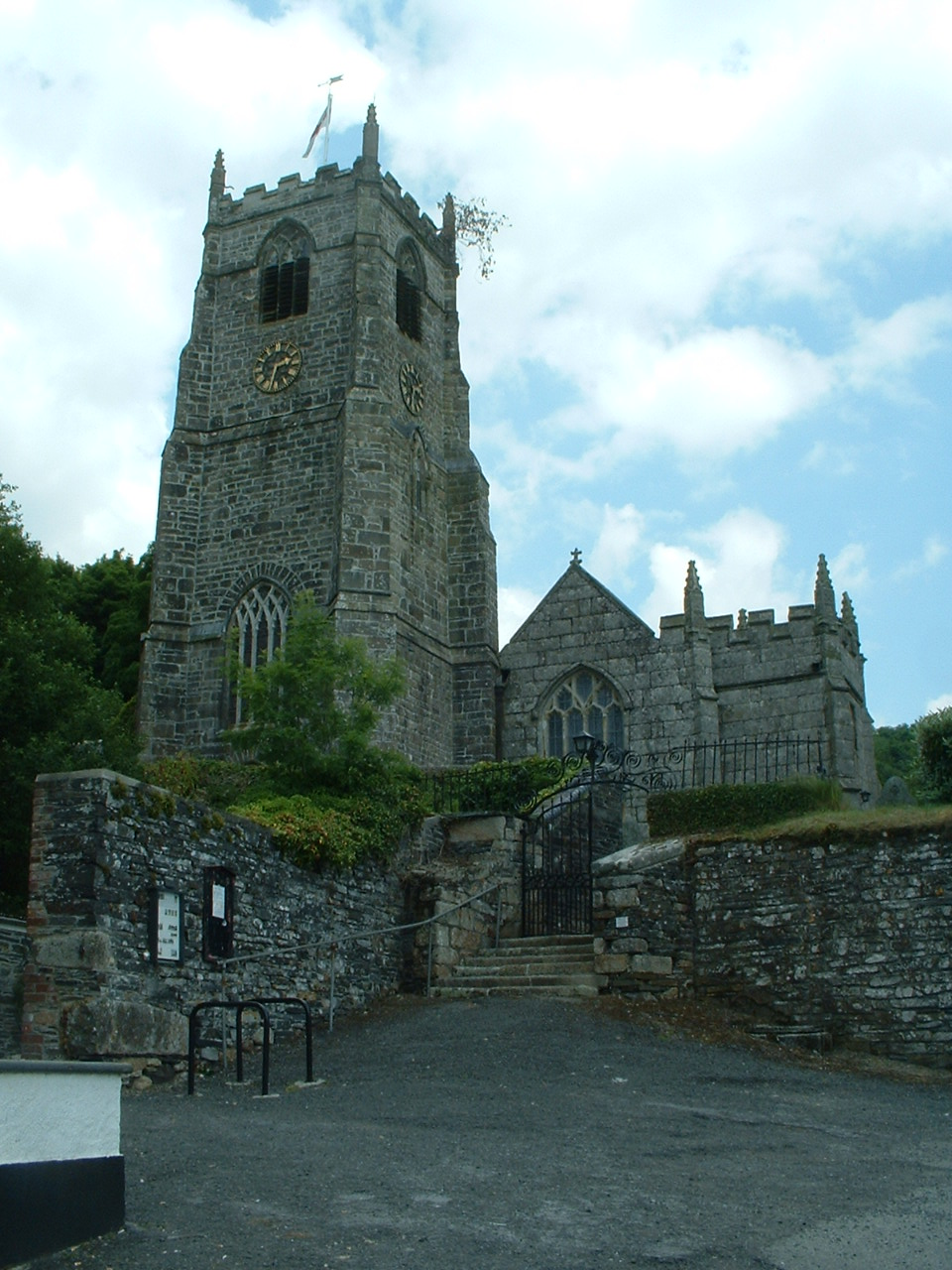
Church in St Neot

The parishes on the moor are as follows:

- Advent
- Altarnun
- Blisland
- Bolventor
- Camelford
- Davidstow
- Lewannick
- Linkinhorne
- North Hill
- St Breward
- St Cleer
- St Clether
- St Ive
- St Neot
- Warleggan

== History and antiquities ==
=== Prehistoric times ===
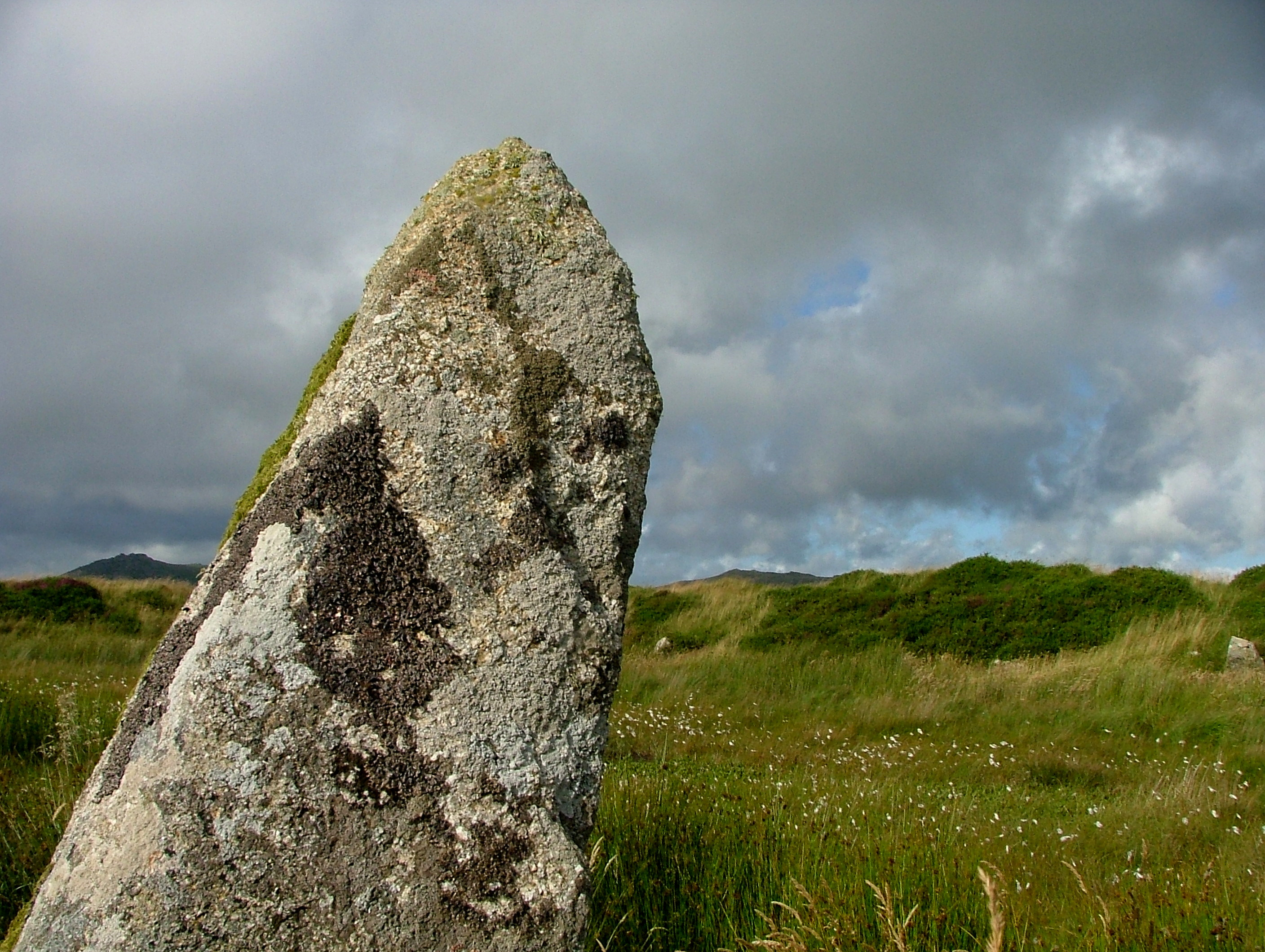
King Arthur's Hall

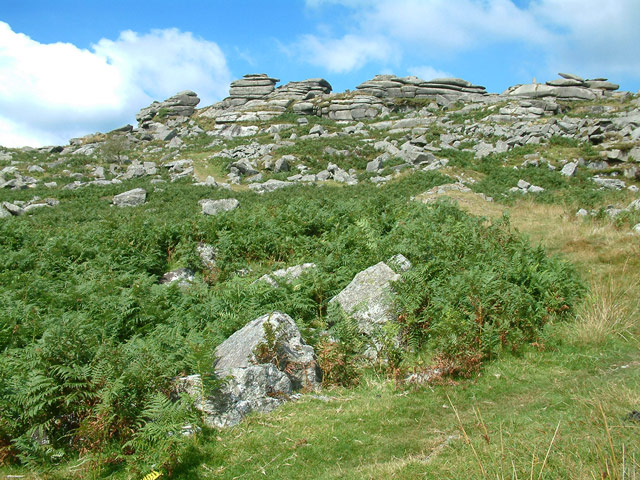
Kilmar Tor

10,000 years ago, in the Mesolithic period, hunter-gatherers wandered the area when it was wooded. There are several documented cases of flint scatters being discovered by archaeologists, indicating that these hunter-gatherers practised flint knapping in the region.

During the Neolithic era, from about 4,500 to 2,300 BC, people began clearing trees and farming the land. It was also in this era that the production of various megalithic monuments began, predominantly long cairns (three of which have currently been identified, at Louden, Catshole and Bearah) and stone circles (sixteen of which have been identified). It was also likely that the naturally forming tors were also viewed in a similar manner to the manmade ceremonial sites.

In the following Bronze Age, the creation of monuments increased dramatically, with the production of over 300 further cairns, and more stone circles and stone rows. More than 200 Bronze Age settlements with enclosures and field patterns have been recorded. and many prehistoric stone barrows and circles lie scattered across the moor. In the late 1990s, a team of archaeologists and anthropologists from UCL researched the Bronze Age landscapes of Leskernick over several seasons (Barbara Bender; Sue Hamilton; Christopher Tilley and students). In a programme shown in 2007 Channel 4's Time Team investigated a 500-metre cairn and the site of a Bronze Age village on the slopes of Rough Tor.

King Arthur's Hall, thought to be a late Neolithic or early Bronze Age ceremonial site, can be found to the east of St Breward on the moor.

=== Medieval and modern times ===
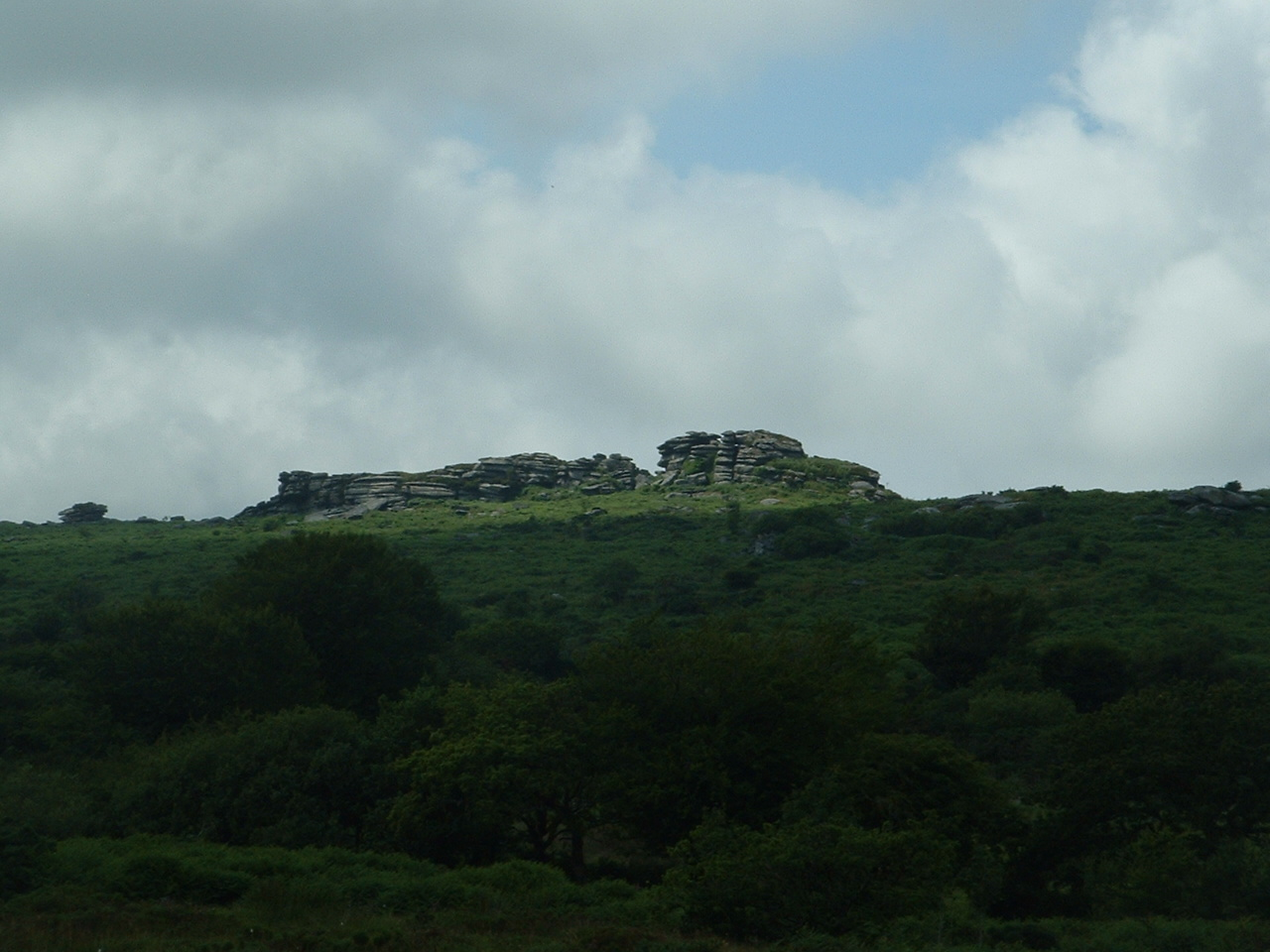
Hawk's Tor, west of North Hill

Where practicable, areas of the moor were used for pasture by herdsmen from the parishes surrounding the moor. Granite boulders were also taken from the moor and used for stone posts and to a certain extent for building (such material is known as moorstone). Granite quarrying only became reasonably productive when gunpowder became available.

The moor gave its name (Foweymore) to one of the medieval districts called stannaries which administered tin mining: the boundaries of these were never defined precisely. Until the establishment of a turnpike road through the moor (the present A30) in the 1770s the size of the moorland area made travel within Cornwall very difficult.

Its Cornish name, Goen Bren, is first recorded in the 12th century.

English Heritage monographs "Bodmin Moor: An Archaeological Survey" Volume 1 and Volume 2 covering the post-medieval and modern landscape are publicly available through the Archaeology Data Service.

Jamaica Inn is a traditional inn on the Moor. Built as a coaching inn in 1750 and having an association with smuggling, it was used as a staging post for changing horses.

After an accidental release of aluminium sulphate in July 1988 into the water supply in Camelford there have been problems. The Camelford water pollution incident has involved ongoing medical research after many people had medical issues and some died.

From 1960 to 2018 Robin Hanbury-Tenison farmed over 2,000 acres of hill farm on Bodmin Moor with sheep and cattle, diversified with Angora goats, red deer and wild boar from Russia, and later farming energy from wind, solar, water and biomass. The farm has been farmed by Merlin Hanbury-Tenison since 2018 who aims for greater sustainability.

=== Monuments and ruins ===
Roughtor was the site of a medieval chapel of St Michael and is now designated as a memorial to the 43rd Wessex Division of the British Army. In 1844 on Bodmin Moor the body of 18-year-old Charlotte Dymond was discovered. Local labourer Matthew Weeks was accused of the murder, and at noon on 12 August 1844 he was led from Bodmin Gaol and hanged. The murder site now has a monument erected from public money, and her grave is at Davidstow churchyard.

== Legends and traditions ==
Dozmary Pool is identified by some people with the lake in which, according to Arthurian legend, Sir Bedivere threw Excalibur to The Lady of the Lake. Another legend relating to the pool concerns Jan Tregeagle.

The Beast of Bodmin has been reported many times but never identified with certainty. The Beast of Bodmin is an instance of sightings of a British big cat. Searches for physical "evidence" to support such a claim has typically been found to have far more ordinary and less sensational origins. In the case of the Beast of Bodmin, when a skull found in the River Fowey was presented to the Natural History Museum as proof of its existence, it was found to have been cut from a leopard skin rug.

== In popular culture ==
Cornish Cowboy, a 2014 short documentary film screened at the 2015 Cannes Film Festival, was shot on Bodmin Moor. The film features the work of St Neot horse trainer, Dan Wilson.

The moor features as the location of Ross Poldark’s cottage in the BBC TV historical drama series Poldark.

Nick Louth’s detective novel “The Last Ride” takes place on Bodmin Moor.

Daphne du Maurier's novel "Jamaica Inn" also takes place on the Bodmin Moor.

== See also ==
- List of topics related to Cornwall
- Brown Willy effect
