= The Beacon, Cornwall =

Hill on Bodmin Moor, Cornwall, England

The Beacon
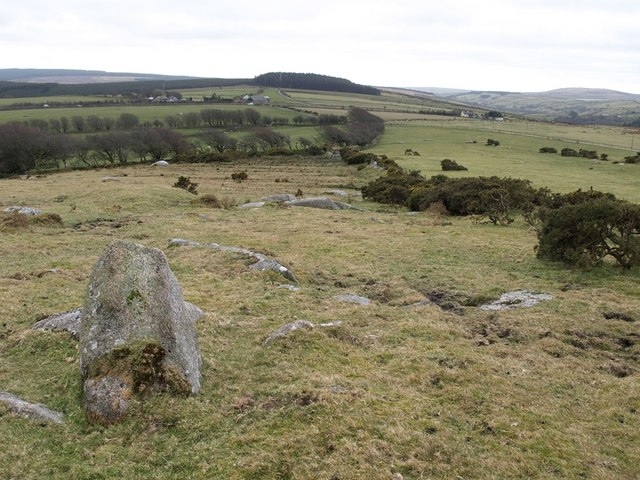
- Southern slopes of The Beacon below Elephant Rock.

Highest point
- Elevation: 369 m (1,211 ft)
- Prominence: 91 m (299 ft)
- Listing: TuMP, sub-HuMP
- Coordinates: 50.5865°N 4.5505°W

Naming
- Native name: An Tansys (Cornish)

Geography
- Location: Bodmin Moor, England
- OS grid: SX196792
- Topo map: OS Landranger 201, Explorer 109

The Beacon (Cornish: An Tansys) on Hendra Downs is a prominent hill, 369 metres (1,211 ft) high, located on the northeastern side of Bodmin Moor in the county of Cornwall, England.
