= Brown Willy =

Highest point in Cornwall, England

- Bronn Wennili
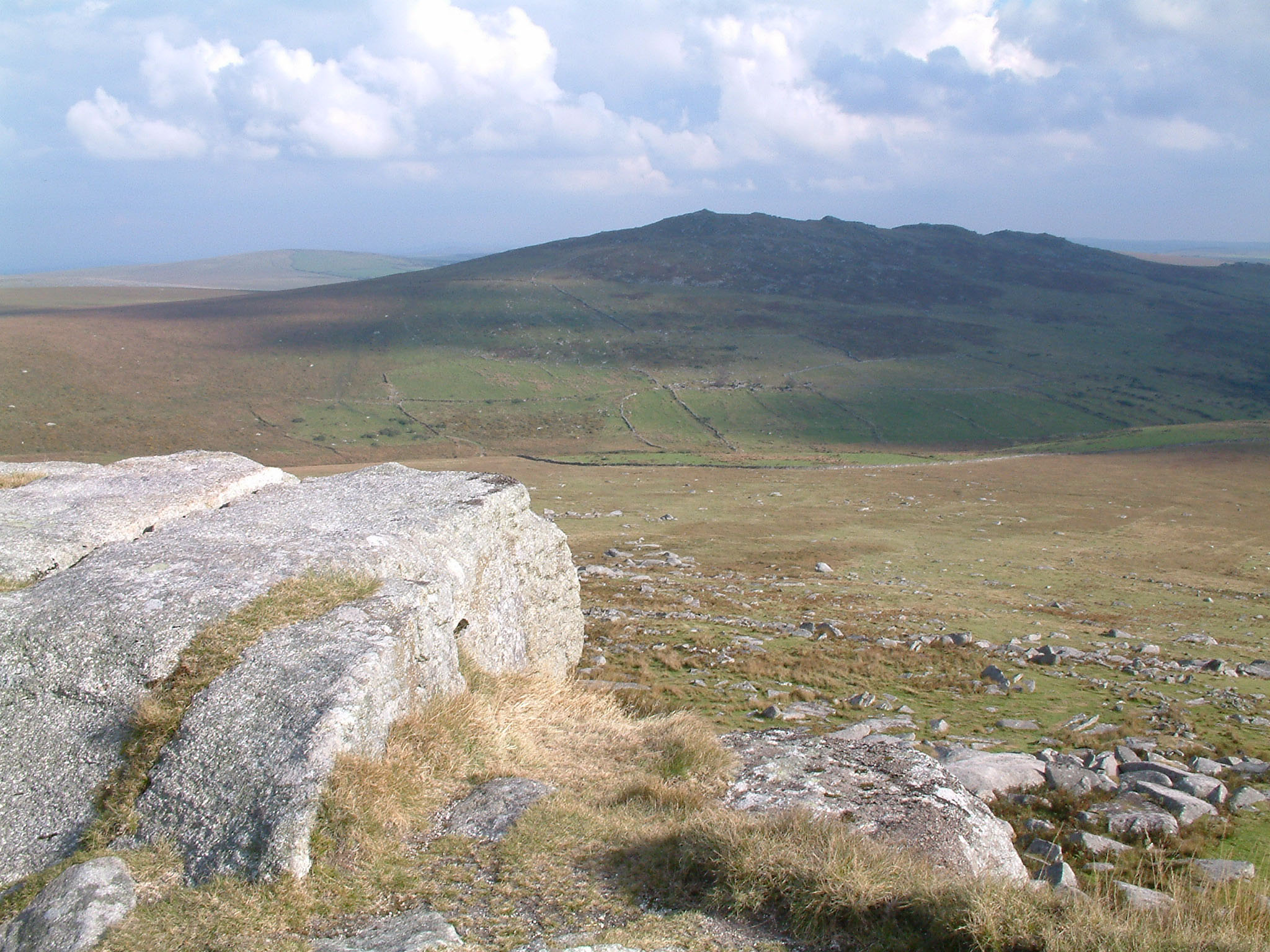
- Brown Willy from the summit of Rough Tor

Highest point
- Elevation: 420 m (1,380 ft)
- Prominence: 314 m (1,030 ft)
- Parent peak: High Willhays
- Listing: Marilyn, County Top
- Coordinates: 50°35′20″N 4°36′08″W

Geography
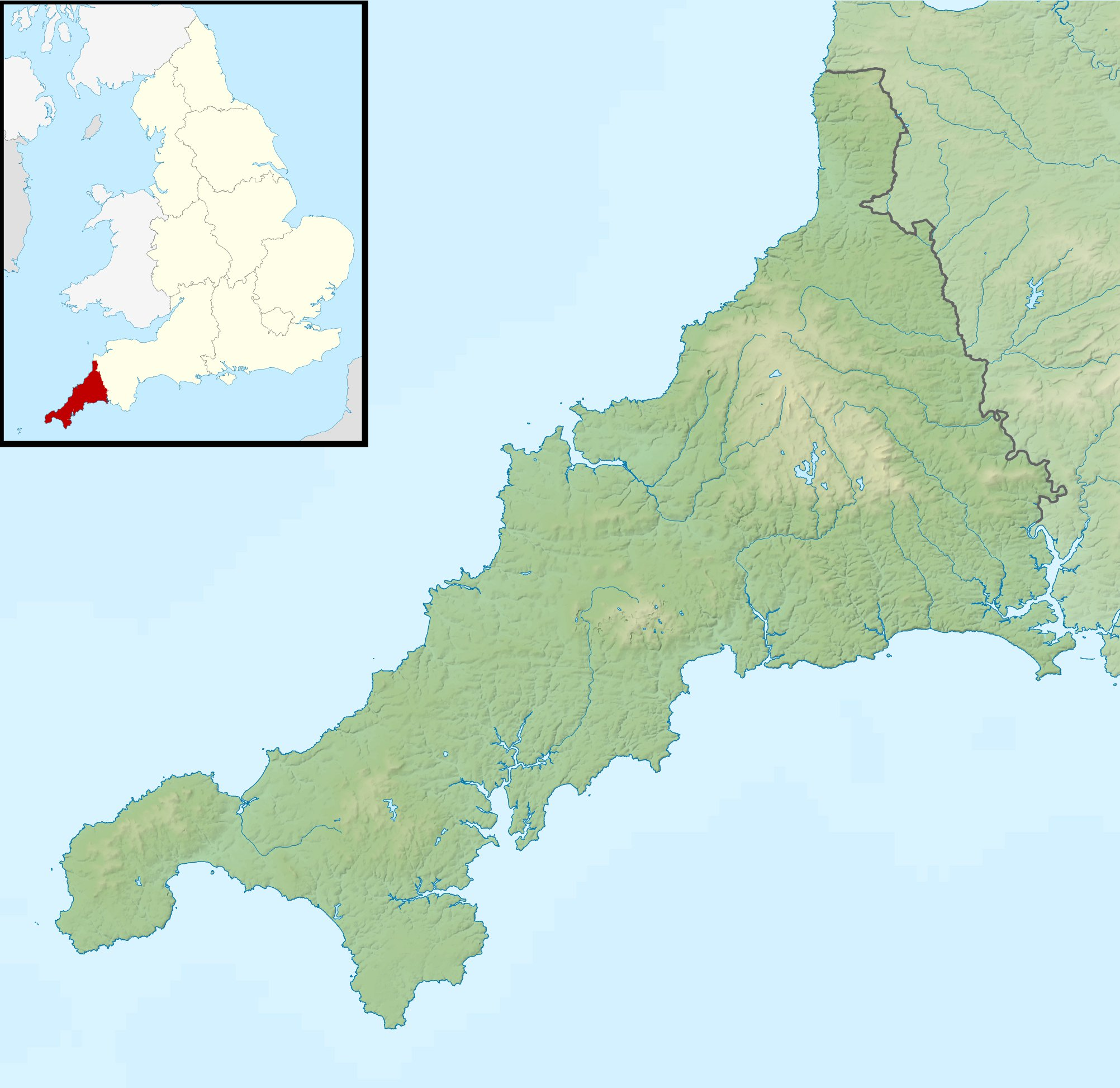
- Location within Cornwall Location within the United Kingdom
- Location: Bodmin Moor, Cornwall, UK
- OS grid: SX158799
- Topo map: OS Landranger 201

Brown Willy (Cornish: Bronn Wennili, meaning "the hill of swallows") is a hill in Cornwall, United Kingdom. The summit, at 1,378 feet (420 metres) above sea level, is the highest point of Bodmin Moor and of Cornwall as a whole. It is about 2 1/2 miles (4 kilometres) northwest of Bolventor and 4 miles (6 kilometres) southeast of Camelford. The hill has a variable appearance that depends on the vantage point from which it is seen. It bears the conical appearance of a sugarloaf from the north but widens into a long multi-peaked crest from closer range.

== Toponymy ==
The first part of the hill's name is a common Brythonic element meaning "breast, pap; hill-side, slope, breast (of hill)", which is frequent in Welsh placenames. The Cornish historian and language expert Henry Jenner suggested that the name came from a corruption of the Cornish words bronn ughella/ewhella meaning "highest hill", as it is the highest point of Bodmin Moor and of Cornwall. The highest hill in Devon has the similar name, High Willhays which falls in line with this theory. In 1988, toponymist Oliver Padel has put forward the alternative suggestion, that he suggests, could be from 'Bronn Wennili' which translates as 'Hill of Swallows'. The name has evolved through a variety of historical spellings as follows: Brunwenely c.1200, 1239; Brown Wenely 1239; Brenwenelyn 1276; Bronwenely, Brunwely 1280; Brounwenely 1350, 1362; Broun Welyn 1386; Brounwenyly 1401; Brownwenelegh 1450, 1470; Brounwellye, Bronwelly 1576; Brown-wellye 1584; Brounwellie 1639; Menar Brownuello 1754.

It has frequently been noted on lists of unusual place names. In 2012 a campaign was launched to have the hill's name restored to the original Bronn Wennili on the grounds that it would be "slightly more attractive to residents and tourists than Brown Willy". Cornish residents objected to the idea. One commented: "It's been Brown Willy for as far back as living memory goes and I suspect, as others have pointed out, that it will always be called that, whatever name we may formally give it." The Daily Telegraph ran an editorial supporting the existing name and called for campaigners to keep their "hands off Brown Willy".

== Geography and geology ==
The summit of Brown Willy is 1,378 feet (420 metres) above sea level, the highest point on Bodmin Moor and in the county of Cornwall. The geography of the surrounding terrain is typical of Bodmin Moor – tors surrounded by desolate moorland. Streams and marshes are common surrounding the summit, and the River Fowey rises nearby. There are naturally occurring piles of granite boulders around the summit.

The hill is part of a 1,221-acre (494-hectare) estate known as Fernacre and includes a five-bedroom farm house. The property was put on the market in September 2016 for £2.8 million and sold to an undisclosed buyer the following April. The new owner has the grazing rights for the property and shooting rights for deer, snipe and woodcock. Under the Countryside and Rights of Way Act 2000, the public will continue to have the right to walk on the hill.

== Brown Willy Cairns ==
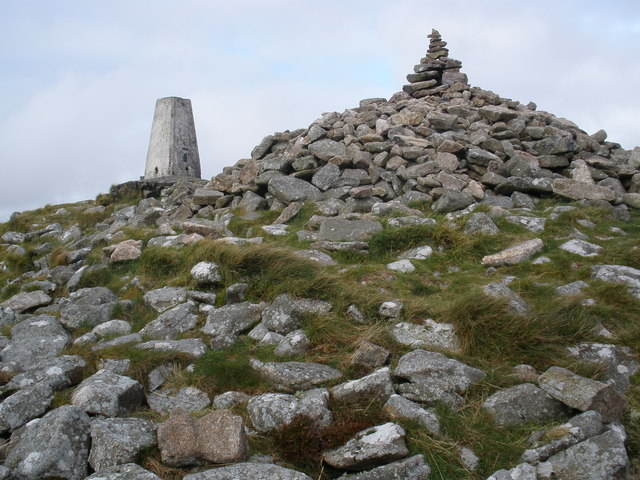
Brown Willy Summit (North) Cairn with Ordnance Survey triangulation station

There are two man-made cairns on the summit. Brown Willy Summit Cairn or Brown Willy North Cairn is a man made rock pile that sits alongside an Ordnance Survey triangulation station.

The Cornish word for "cairn" is karn (from karnow, meaning "rock piles"), and it has been suggested that Cornwall's ancient name Kernow is related. William Copeland Borlase classified ridge-top cairns such as these in the most common category a "bowl"- or "cone"-shaped tumulus. He also referred to them as "sepulchral mounds" but admitted that burials had not been found at many. Brown Willy Summit Cairn has never been excavated and folklore suggests an ancient Cornish king may lie entombed underneath. Nicholas Johnson and Peter Rose dated nine of the cairns on Bodmin Moor, eight have mean dates which range between 2162 and 1746 cal BC, suggesting the early Bronze Age was the main building period for cairns of this type. These are amongst the most intact due to their remote and inaccessible location. Many rocks from similar cairns have been spoiled and removed over centuries of neglect to be re-used in dry stone walling and other local construction.

Rodney Castleden has suggested that from the centre of Stannon stone circle, the autumn equinox sun rises over Brown Willy North Cairn. and Christopher Tilley refers to a "dramatic association with Rough Tor. These purported alignments have been taken as evidence of some astronomical purpose in cairn placement and construction.

== Recreation ==
Here, in his deafness and his loneliness,
My father's sad grey eyes in gathering dusk
Saw Roughtor and Brown Willy hide the view
Of that bold coast-line where he was not born—

— John Betjeman, Summoned by Bells (1960)

Brown Willy is a popular destination for walkers and is said to be one of "the UK's best-loved high points". The hill features in an annual race held on New Year's Day that starts and finishes at Jamaica Inn, an old coaching inn made famous by Daphne du Maurier's 1936 novel of the same name.

Brown Willy and Rough Tor are listed in a Ward Lock travel guide from the 1920s as places to visit, saying that 'The scenery is wildly grand, rugged and bleak' and recommending hiring a vehicle from Camelford for the visit.

The hill is regarded as a sacred mountain by members of the Aetherius Society, a UFO religion founded in 1954 by George King. They believe that Brown Willy was charged with "holy energy" on 23 November, which they celebrate each year as "Charging Day", and gather at the hill on that day each year to celebrate the sun's alignment with "positive and negative rocks". Other Aetherian "holy mountains" include Mount Kilimanjaro in Tanzania, a mountain in California, two in New South Wales in Australia and two in Devon.

== Environment ==
The hill is known for a meteorological phenomenon known as the Brown Willy effect, in which heavy rainfall develops over high ground and then travels downwind for a long distance. The effect produces heavy localised rain which can cause disastrous flash flooding such as the Boscastle flood of 2004. In another case when the effect was manifested, a continuous line of showers developed on 27 March 2006 stretching 145 miles (233 kilometres) from Brown Willy to Oxfordshire.

Brown Willy is unusual in that, unlike other hills on Bodmin Moor, there is little evidence of prehistoric settlement around it. It may have instead been set aside for use as a communal area for people from the surrounding settlements, who may have used the ridge as a ceremonial procession route. There are no house circles or platforms in the area of the summit. The remains of seventeen houses and platforms have been found on the lower part of the eastern slopes and another 23 low on the western slopes; they were crudely constructed and probably only used seasonally. Nearly two-thirds of them were constructed in positions with a clear line of sight to the summit of Brown Willy and the nearby hill of Rough Tor, suggesting that the hilltops were viewed as special places.

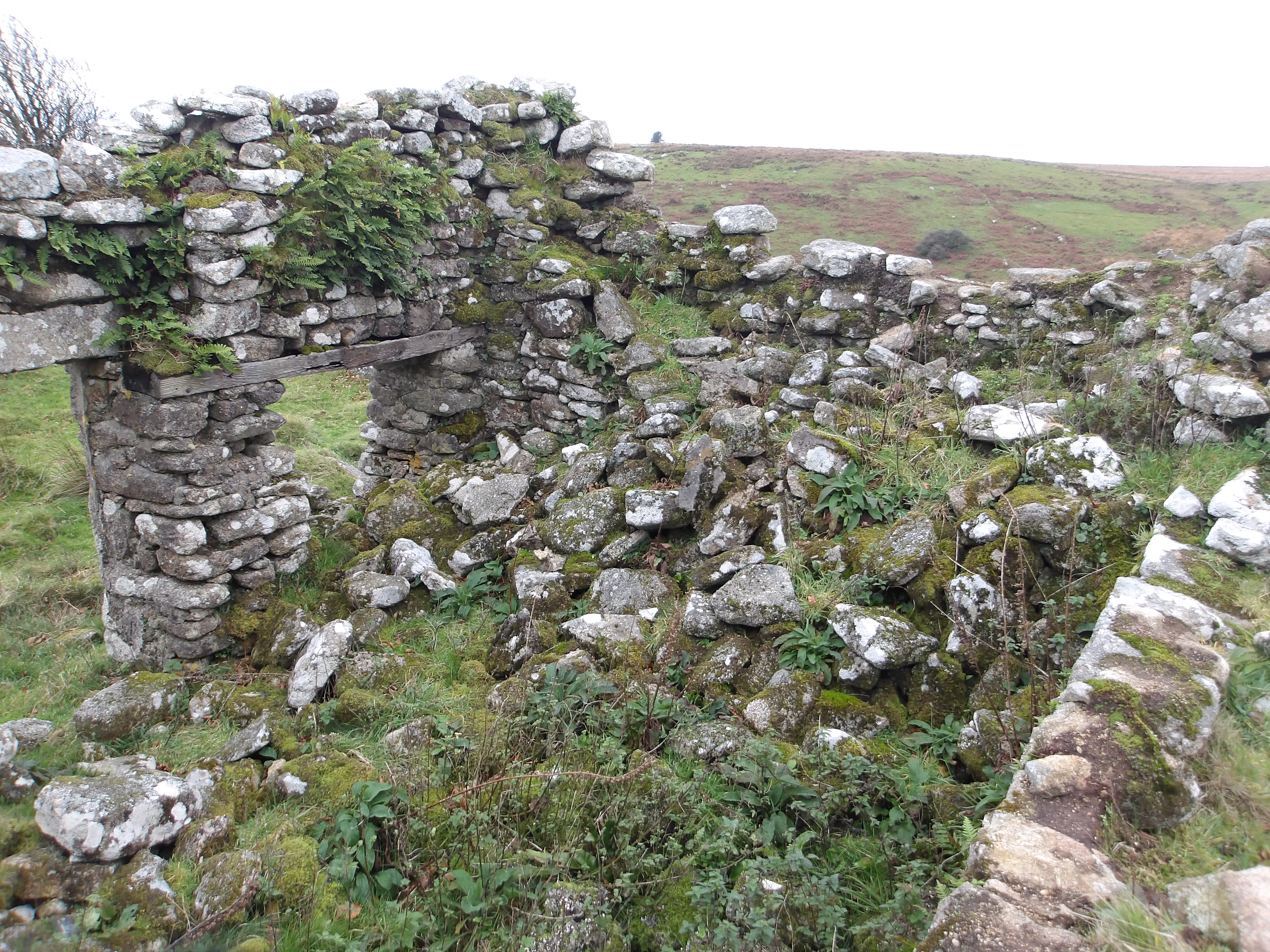
A deserted village in the valley in between Brown Willy and Showery Tor

== Media ==
It is the location for a comedy film of the same name, about two 40-year-old former school-friends on a misguided stag do, written and directed by Brett Harvey.
