= Cornwall National Landscape =

Designated coastal areas and a moorland in southwesternmost county of England

- Tirwedh Genedhlek Kernow
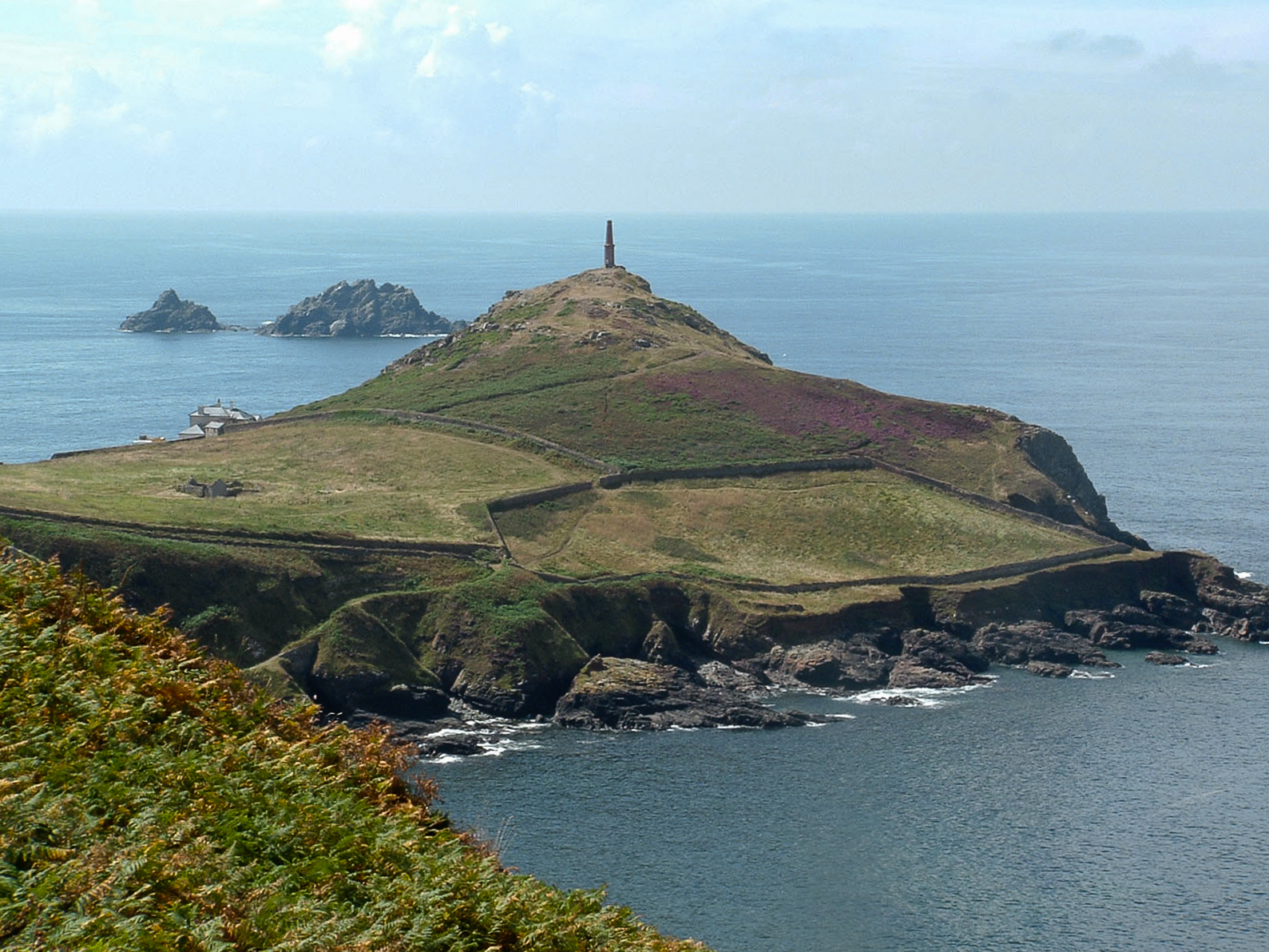
- Cape Cornwall

- Location of Cornwall AONB
- Interactive map of Cornwall National Landscape
- Location: Cornwall, England
- Established: 1959
- Website: www.cornwall-landscape.org

Cornwall National Landscape (Cornish: Tirwedh Genedhlek Kernow) is an Area of Outstanding Natural Beauty (AONB) in Cornwall, England, United Kingdom. It was formerly known as, and is still legally designated as, Cornwall Area of Outstanding Natural Beauty (Cornish: Ranndir a Dekter Naturek a Vri Kernow), with the National Landscape branding adopted in November 2023.

The National Landscape covers 958 square kilometres (370 sq mi), or about 27% of the total area of the county. It comprises 12 separate sections, of which 11 cover stretches of coastline and one Bodmin Moor, which together are treated as a single National Landscape.

It was designated in 1959 for special landscape protection, and under the Countryside and Rights of Way Act 2000, Cornwall Council is required to produce a 5-year management plan, and authorities must have regard to the purpose of conserving and enhancing natural beauty when discharging any function affecting land within the National Landscape.

== Designation ==
The sections were designated under the National Parks and Access to the Countryside Act 1949 in 1959, except for the Camel estuary which was added in 1981. The list of designated sections is:

1. Hartland (Morwenstow and Kilkhampton)
2. Pentire Point to Widemouth
3. Camel Estuary
4. Trevose Head to Stepper Point (Bedruthan to Padstow)
5. St Agnes
6. Godrevy to Portreath
7. West Penwith
8. South Coast—Western (Lizard and Marazion to Helford River)
9. South Coast—Central (Mylor and the Roseland to Porthpean)
10. South Coast—Eastern (Par Sands to Looe)
11. Rame Head
12. Bodmin Moor

There are two other National Landscapes in Cornwall, Tamar Valley National Landscape (which straddles the county boundary with Devon) and the Isles of Scilly.

== Management ==
Cornwall National Landscape is managed by a partnership of 21 organisations, including:

- Cornwall Agri-food Council
- Cornwall Association of Local Councils
- Cornwall Council
- Cornwall Heritage Trust
- Cornwall Rural Community Charity
- Cornwall Sustainable Tourism Project (CoaST)
- Cornwall Wildlife Trust
- Country Land and Business Association
- ERCCIS (Environmental Records Centre for Cornwall & the Isles of Scilly)
- Historic England
- Farming & Wildlife Advisory Group (FWAG)
- King Harry Ferry
- National Farmers Union
- National Trust
- Natural England
- Rural Cornwall & Isles of Scilly Partnership (RCP)
- University of Exeter in Cornwall
- VisitCornwall
- Volunteer Cornwall
- Westcountry Rivers Trust

The partnership meets twice a year to identify the prioritisation of action and the implementation of the plan. The partnership also has an advisory role, providing advice to Cornwall Council and other organisations on matters such as planning and project development. The partnership is supported by a team of officers, the Cornwall AONB Unit, who exist to administer the partnership, undertake delivery, access resources, influence, enable and support partner organisations in the delivery of the management plan.

The first management plan was adopted by the members of the partnership in July 2004. The latest Cornwall AONB Management Plan, 2022-27, was adopted by Cornwall Council and the members of the partnership in May 2022.

== Principal summits ==
Hills within the National Landscape with more than 30 metres of prominence
Hill	Elevation	Prominence	Grid reference
Brown Willy	420 m (1378 ft)	322 m	SX158800
Rough Tor	400 m (1312 ft)	86 m	SX145807
Kilmar Tor	396 m (1299 ft)	118 m	SX252748
Stowe's Hill	381 m (1250 ft)	78 m	SX257724
Langstone Downs	380 m (1247 ft)	33 m	SX255738
The Beacon	369 m (1211 ft)	92 m	SX196792
Tolborough Tor	348 m (1142 ft)	42 m	SX175778
Newel Tor	346 m (1135 ft)	62 m	SX236741
Bray Down	346 m (1135 ft)	56 m	SX188821
Buttern Hill	346 m (1135 ft)	48 m	SX174816
Brown Gelly	342 m (1122 ft)	74 m	SX195727
Garrow Tor	331.2 m (1087 ft)	56.6 m	SX145785
Ridge	331 m (1086 ft)	44 m	SX242777
Hawk's Tor (east)	329 m (1079 ft)	37 m	SX253763
Leskernick Hill	329 m (1079 ft)	35 m	SX183803
Fox Tor	323 m (1060 ft)	35 m	SX226785
Butter's Tor	316 m (1037 ft)	34 m	SX154783
Louden Hill	315 m (1033 ft)	32 m	SX137803
Condolden Barrow	307.5 m (1009 ft)	48.5 m	SX090871
Hawk's Tor (west)	307 m (1007 ft)	60 m	SX141755
Brockabarrow Common	306 m (1004 ft)	31 m	SX160747
Alex Tor	291 m (955 ft)	30 m	SX118787
Berry Down	283 m (928 ft)	37 m	SX196690
Carburrow Tor	280 m (919 ft)	41 m	SX155708
Notter Tor	279 m (915 ft)	42 m	SX271737
Temple Tor	275.3 m (903 ft)	34.5 m	SX140736
Great Care Hill	272.7 m (895 ft)	31.8 m	SX141712
Tresparrett Down	263 m (863 ft)	65 m	SX134932
Watch Croft	252.9 m (830 ft)	227.2 m	SW420357
Trendrine Hill	247 m (810 ft)	63 m	SW478387
Rosewall Hill	227 m (745 ft)	68 m	SW487391
Boswens Common	225.4 m (740 ft)	44 m	SW401325
Bartinney Downs	224 m (735 ft)	50 m	SW394293
Mulfra Hill	221 m (725 ft)	33 m	SW450354
Trink Hill	212 m (696 ft)	58 m	SW504371
Carn Brea	199 m (653 ft)	31 m	SW385280
St Agnes Beacon	192 m (630 ft)	85 m	SW710502
Trencrom Hill	176 m (577 ft)	46 m	SW518362
Tregole Hill	156 m (512 ft)	30 m	SX194974
Pencarrow Head	137 m (449 ft)	66 m	SX152510
Castle Dore Hill	127.1 m (417 ft)	39.5 m	SX103555
Maker Heights	123 m (404 ft)	54 m	SX436515
Rame Hill	122 m (400 ft)	38 m	SX432495
Golant Down	119 m (390 ft)	35 m	SX118544
Dodman Point	114 m (374 ft)	39 m	SX002394
Goonhilly Down	114 m (374 ft)	54 m	SW725212
Roskruge Beacon	113 m (371 ft)	37 m	SW779231
Crousa Common	111.5 m (366 ft)	30.8 m	SW771208
Lobb's Shop Hill	108.7 m (357 ft)	41 m	SX029491
Penhalt Cliff	103 m (338 ft)	31 m	SS188004
Castle Point	103 m (338 ft)	31 m	SX145976
Parnall's Hill	97.9 m (321 ft)	32 m	SW963415
Trebollack Hill	96 m (315 ft)	32 m	SW887438
Treveor Hill	94 m (308 ft)	34 m	SW873442
Carlyon Hill	90 m (295 ft)	35 m	SW957753
Tolverne Hill	88 m (289 ft)	44 m	SW851397
The Island	86 m (282 ft)	59.1 m	SX049890
Mount Cundy	86 m (282 ft)	43 m	SW857423
Porth Kea Hill	85 m (279 ft)	31 m	SW830417
Windmill Hill	82 m (269 ft)	31 m	SW850353
Long Island	81.6 m (268 ft)	81.6 m	SX073905
Curgurrell Hill	79 m (259 ft)	32 m	SW886378
Crugmeer Hill	78 m (256 ft)	32 m	SW902763
Lye Rock	76 m (249 ft)	64 m	SX063897
Cant Hill	75.6 m (248 ft)	34.8 m	SW948744
Bohortha Hill	75 m (246 ft)	59 m	SW861326
Tregew Hill	74.8 m (245 ft)	30.6 m	SW807349
Trevose Head	74 m (243 ft)	55 m	SW852764
Drake's Downs	67.8 m (222 ft)	33.7 m	SW850312
Trewince Hill	67.1 m (220 ft)	31 m	SW864337
Trelease Hill	66 m (217 ft)	34 m	SW844409
Cape Cornwall	64 m (210 ft)	33 m	SW350318
St Michael's Mount	61 m (200 ft)	61 m	SW514298
Gull Rock (Boscastle)	60 m (197 ft)	60 m	SX117933
Woodbury Hill	58 m (190 ft)	35 m	SW846421
Carnewas Island	51 m (167 ft)	36 m	SW846689
The Mouls	50 m (164 ft)	50 m	SW938815
Gull Rock (Lizard)	48.7 m (160 ft)	48.7 m	SW682130
Gull Rock (Trebarwith)	48.4 m (159 ft)	48.4 m	SX038864
The Vro	46.3 m (152 ft)	41 m	SW663175
Short Island	46 m (151 ft)	46 m	SX076908
Middle Merope Island	44.1 m (145 ft)	44.1 m	SW894771
Pen a Grader East	42.5 m (139 ft)	37.8 m	SW733529
Ardevora Veor	41 m (135 ft)	34 m	SW875410
Grower Rock	40 m (131 ft)	40 m	SX083908
Lion Rock	39.6 m (130 ft)	38.2 m	SW687129
Newland	39 m (128 ft)	39 m	SW914811
Higher Merope Island	39 m (128 ft)	39 m	SW895772
Hells Mouth Stack	38.5 m (126 ft)	38.5 m	SW603430
Diggory's Island	38 m (125 ft)	38 m	SW847701
Samaritan Island	38 m (125 ft)	38 m	SW848697
Lower Merope Island	37.5 m (123 ft)	35.1 m	SW894770
Crane Island	37.2 m (122 ft)	37.2 m	SW633441
Gull Rock (Veryan)	37 m (121 ft)	37 m	SW927368
Hanover Cove Stack	37 m (121 ft)	37 m	SW737532
Porthmoina Island	37 m (121 ft)	35 m	SW415368
Meachard	36.7 m (120 ft)	36.7 m	SX089916
Samphire Island	36.2 m (119 ft)	36.2 m	SW638447
Pendarves Island	36.1 m (118 ft)	34.2 m	SW847693
The Sisters South	35.8 m (117 ft)	35.8 m	SX060899
The Sisters North	33.4 m (110 ft)	33.4 m	SX060900
The Brisons	33 m (108 ft)	33 m	SW340311
Mullion Island	32.6 m (107 ft)	32.6 m	SW659175
Sevensouls Rock	32 m (105 ft)	32 m	SW934812
Bosistow Island	31.8 m (104 ft)	31.8 m	SW356231
Gulland Rock	30 m (98 ft)	30 m	SW878789
