= Leaze stone circle =

Stone circle on Bodmin Moor, Cornwall, England

- Location within Cornwall
- 50.565529°N 4.63246°W
- Type: Stone circle
- Periods: Bronze Age
- Location: Bodmin Moor, Cornwall

Leaze stone circle is a stone circle located in the parish of St. Breward on Bodmin Moor in Cornwall, UK (grid reference SX13667728).

== Description ==
The circle stands in enclosed pasture near the buildings of Leaze farm and is composed of sixteen stones, six of which have fallen. It is approximately twenty four metres in diameter and is cut through the centre by a hedge. It has been estimated the circle once comprised twenty two stones. There is one stone positioned outside of the circle along with three dips suggested to have been formed by removed stones. The stones are of squarish granite of approximately 1.22 metres (4.0 ft) in height and around .50 metres (1.6 ft) wide. Rough Tor, Tolborough Tor and Catshole Tor can be seen from the site with Brown Willy obscured behind Garrow Tor.

The fragmentary remains of two other stone circles (Emblance Downs stone circles) can be found about 300 metres northwest of Leaze stone circle. Less than 1 kilometre in a west by north-west direction lies the enigmatic enclosure known as King Arthur's Hall.

== Alignments ==
Alexander Thom proposed a definitely indicated, site to stone, solar alignment at the site.
