= Emblance Downs stone circles =

Stone circles on Bodmin Moor, Cornwall, England

- Dons Meyn Goon Gompes (Cornish)
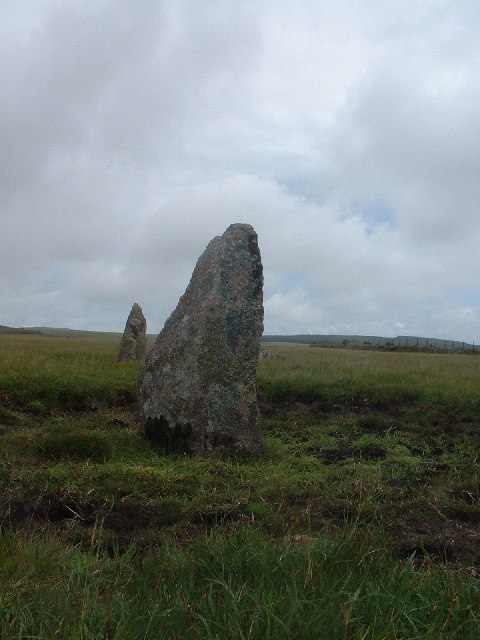
- Part of the Emblance Downs stone circles

- Location within Cornwall
- 50.567448°N 4.635109°W
- Type: Stone circles
- Periods: Bronze Age
- Location: Bodmin Moor, Cornwall

Emblance Downs stone circles (Cornish: Dons Meyn Goon Gompes) are a pair of stone circles located in the parish of St. Breward on Bodmin Moor in Cornwall, UK.

== Description ==
The two ruined stone circles are situated between King Arthur's Downs and Emblance Downs, on Bodmin Moor (grid reference SX134775). They lie close together separated by 2.5 metres and each has a diameter of about 23 metres. The circles had a very irregular spacing of stones, and each ring has an exceptionally large stone to the southeast.

The western circle is better preserved with six upright and two fallen stones on the perimeter, with the one in the southeast being 1.6m long. Another two fallen and perhaps displaced stones are near the centre of the circle. There may have been about 15 stones originally.

The eastern circle has eight surviving stones, with four upright stones and one fallen stone on the perimeter. There are two slabs lying outside the circle, and within the circle there is a long slab (3.3 metres) in the southeast quadrant.

The remains of another stone circle known as Leaze stone circle can be found about 300 metres to the southeast. Around 500 metres in a west by north-west direction lies the enigmatic enclosure known as King Arthur's Hall.
