= Alex Tor =

Stone circles on Bodmin Moor, Cornwall, England

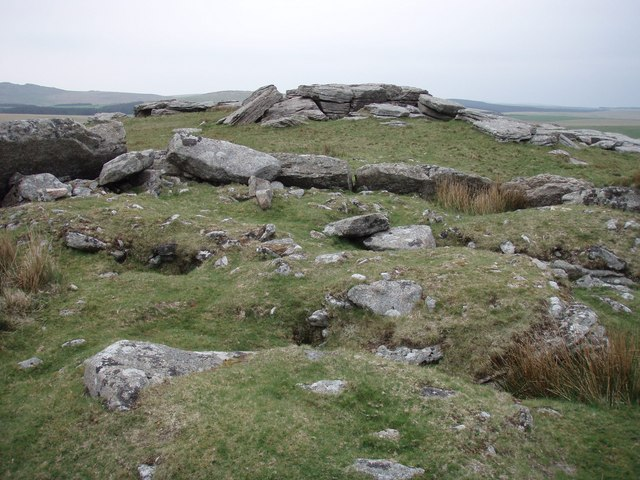
- The large and intricate cairn on the summit.

Highest point
- Elevation: 291 m (955 ft)
- Prominence: 30 m (98 ft)
- Isolation: 2.22 miles
- Listing: TuMP
- Coordinates: 50°35′N 4°40′W

Geography
- Location: Bodmin Moor, England
- OS grid: SX118787
- Topo map: OS Landranger 200, Explorer 109

Geology
- Mountain type: granite tor

Alex Tor is a conical hill, 291 metres (955 ft) high, located in the west of Bodmin Moor in the county of Cornwall, England.

At the summit of Alex Tor are granite rock outcrops and a large and intricate tor cairn. There are panoramic views from the summit plateau and other tors visible include: Rough Tor, Brown Willy, Showery Tor, Garrow Tor and Butter's Tor.

Parking is possible on the lane running SW to NE past the tor, but not beyond the Private Road sign. From here it is an easy climb of less than 1 kilometre.

On the western flank of the hill there are hut circles and the remains of an ancient farmstead.
