= Fernacre =

Stone circle on Bodmin Moor, Cornwall, England

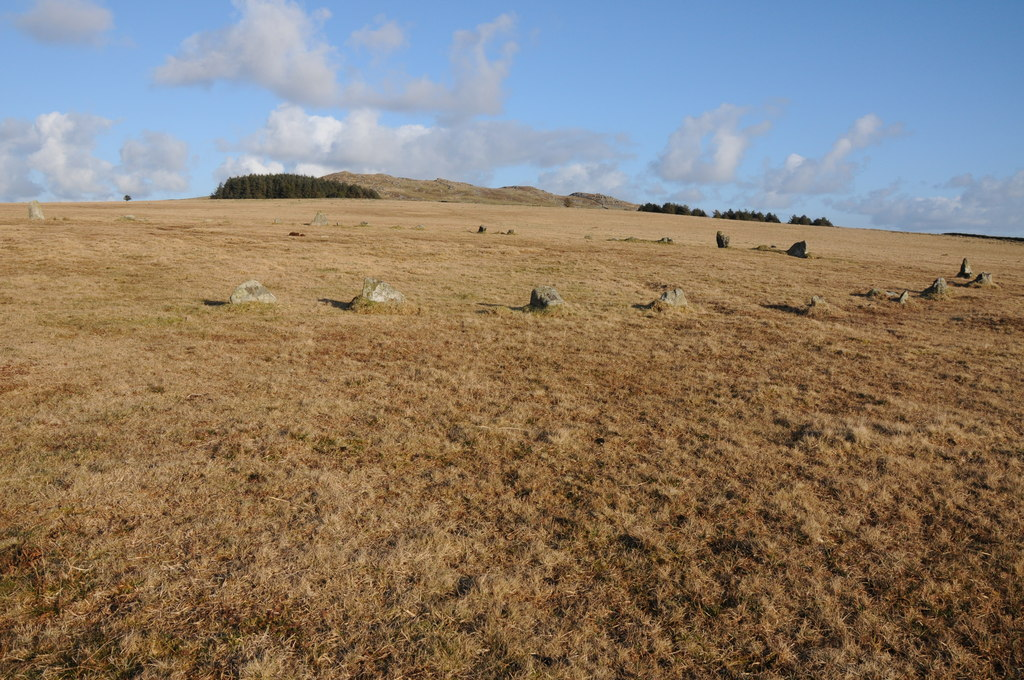
- Fernacre stone circle

- Location within Cornwall
- 50.58995°N 4.62237°W
- Type: Stone circle
- Periods: Bronze Age
- Location: Bodmin Moor, Cornwall

Fernacre (grid reference SX14477997), also known as Fernacre stone circle or Fernacre circle, is a stone circle located on the slopes of the De Lank River, 1.25 miles (2.01 km) northeast of St Breward on Bodmin Moor in Cornwall in the United Kingdom.

== Description ==
It has been suggested to mean bracken-land or come from the old plural for fairy; feren, who was said to be sacred to the ancient Cornish. Fernacre is one of the biggest stone circles in Cornwall. It is slightly flattened in a northwest to southeast direction, measuring 46.2 metres (152 ft) by 43.3 metres (142 ft) The circle contains some 68 or 69 stones with a further 3 displaced within, 38 or 39 remain standing upright. They are deeply sunk into the soil with the tallest stone measuring 1.3 metres (4.3 ft) high and the longest fallen stone 2.1 metres (6.9 ft). Fernacre is a marker for the start of a medieval drove road from Rough Tor to Garrow.

== Archaeology ==
The ruins of what was called Fernacre farm were first recorded in 1327 AD. Numerous hut circles dot the landscape nearby and it has been suggested that the dating for Fernacre is contemporary with these. No bones or remains were found in these hut circles, only a few flaked flints gave clues to its occupation. The Fernacre settlement covered 164 acres, of which 84 show signs of having been farmed. The dating of the sites is uncertain. However, it has been suggested to have been constructed either in the Neolithic or Bronze Age. There are signs that the circle had a retaining bank of earth on its southeast.

== Alignments ==
Fernacre carries a pivotal location between Rough Tor located due north and Brown Willy located due east. Garrow Tor also lies to the east and Louden Hill to the west-southwest. It is only 100 ft from being in a direct line in an easterly direction between Stannon and Brown Willy Cairns; another small erect stone stands in this line eastwards on the way to Brown Willy which has been suggested to mark the equinox sunrise. William Page note that when viewed from the centre of Fernacre circle the sunset on 1 May would align approximately with Louden Hill.

== Literature ==
- William Borlase (1754). Observations on the antiquities, historical and monumental, of the county of Cornwall ...: Consisting of several essays on the first inhabitants, Druid-superstition, customs, and remains of the most remote antiquity, in Britain, and the British Isles ... With a summary of the religious, civil, and military state of Cornwall before the Norman Conquest ... Printed by W. Jackson, in the High-Strand.
- William Copeland Borlase (1872). Naenia Cornubiae: the cromlechs and tumuli of Cornwall. Llanerch. ISBN 978-1-897853-36-8.
- William C. Lukis (1885). The prehistoric stone monuments of the British Isles: Cornwall. Printed for Nichols and Sons for the Society of Antiquaries.
- Aubrey Burl (2005). A guide to the stone circles of Britain, Ireland and Brittany. Yale University Press. ISBN 978-0-300-11406-5.
