= Lank, Cornwall =

Village in Cornwall, England

Coordinates: 50.54791°N 4.69786°W

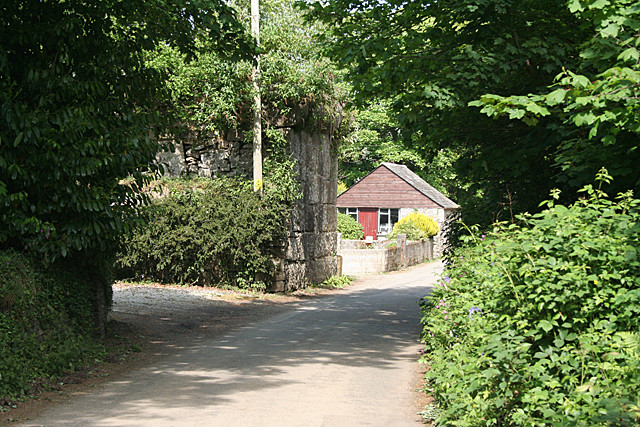
Lower Lank

Lank (Cornish: Lonk) is a settlement in Cornwall, England, United Kingdom. It is situated approximately one mile (1.6 km) south of St Breward and six miles (10 km) east-northeast of Wadebridge in St Breward civil parish. It is in the civil parish of Blisland.

The settlement consists of two hamlets, Higher Lank (to the north) and Lower Lank (to the south), situated on high ground between the valleys of the River Camel and De Lank River from which the settlements take their name.

The De Lank granite quarry is half-a-mile east of Lower Lank. It is owned by Ennstone plc, a multinational asphalt and aggregates business.

Wenfordbridge is half-a-mile to the west and was the terminus of a branch of the Bodmin and Wadebridge railway. A siding from Wenfordbridge ran between Higher Lank and Lower Lank and served the quarry via a rope-worked incline. The siding shut in 1940 but rail services to Wenfordbridge continued until 1985. The trackbed of the line south of Wenfordbridge is now part of the Camel Trail long-distance path and cycleway.
