= Hanscomb (surname) =

Hanscomb is a surname. Notable people with the surname include:

- Brian Hanscomb (born 1944), English artist engraver
- John Hanscomb (1924–2019), British politician

== See also ==
- Hanscom
