= Tor cairn =

Bronze Age sites in Wales and southern England

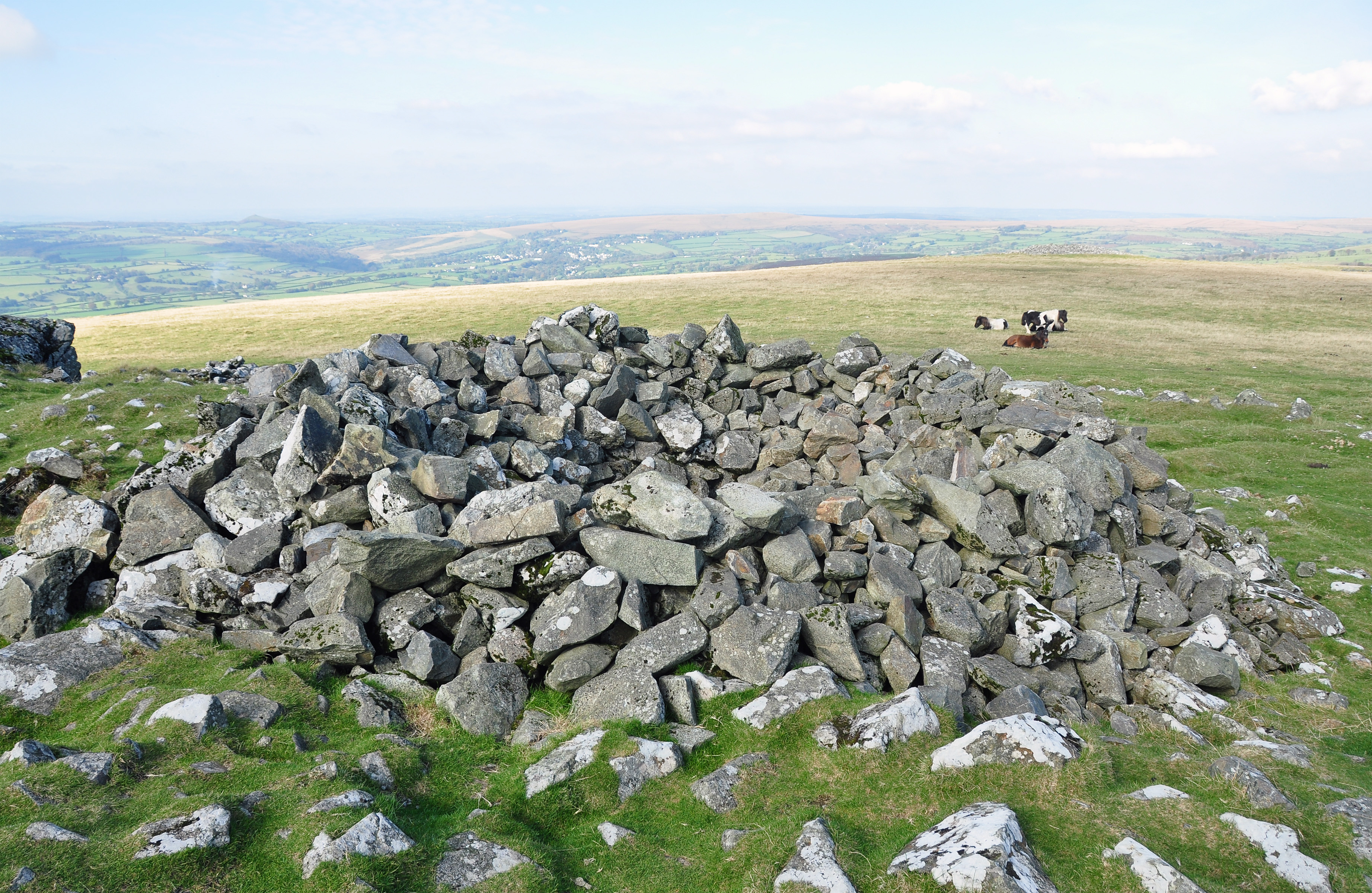
Cox Tor cairn - a platform of loose stones

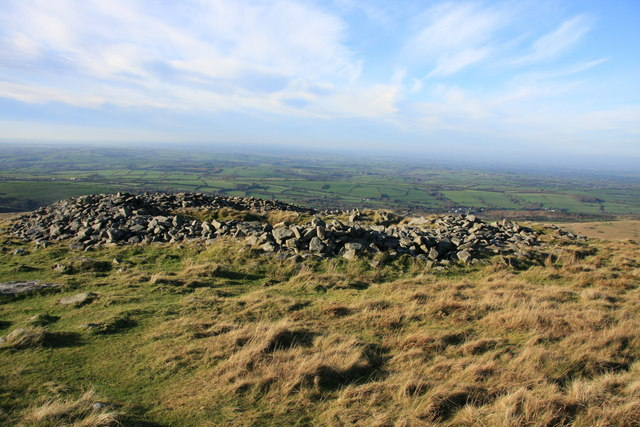
Yes Tor cairn

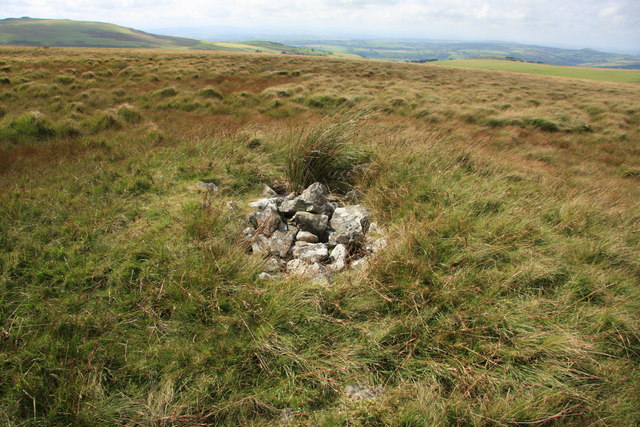
Roos Tor cairn

A tor cairn is a prehistoric cult site occurring in the British Isles, especially in Cornwall and Devon but also in Wales. It consists of a circular enclosure of stones or a platform of loose rocks surrounding a natural tor, sometimes encircled by a ditch. The diameter of the roughly 35 tor cairns ranges from 12 to over 30 metres and their height varies from 0.5 to 4.0 metres. There is usually an entrance to the enclosed area and pits in the ground between the rock outcrop (tor) itself and the enclosure.

Finds of flint tools, pottery, gravel, quartz and bronze weapons and jewellery have enabled the sites to be dated to the early 2nd millennium B.C., i.e. the early Bronze Age.

Examples are the tor cairns of: Alex Tor, Catshole Tor, Corndon Tor, Cox Tor, Hameldown Tor, Limsboro Cairn, White Tor (Peter Tavy), Rough Tor, Tolborough Tor, Top Tor, Tregarrick Tor and Yes Tor.

== See also ==
- British megalith architecture
- Tor enclosure

== Literature ==
- Frances Lynch: Megalithic tombs and Long Barrows in Britain. Shire, Princes Risborough 1997, ISBN 0-7478-0341-2 (Shire archaeology 73).
- Elizabeth Shee Twohig: Irish Megalithic tombs. Shire, Princes Risborough 1990, ISBN 0-7478-0094-4 (Shire archaeology 63).
- Jürgen E. Walkowitz: Das Megalithsyndrom. Vol. 36 in Beiträge zur Ur- und Frühgeschichte Mitteleuropas, 2003, ISBN 9783930036707.
