= Tuckingmill =

Tuckingmill or Tucking Mill may refer to:

- Fulling mill, part of the textile industry

== Places ==
- Tucking Mill, a hamlet in Somerset, England
- Tuckingmill, Camborne, Cornwall, a village in Camborne, Cornwall, England
- Tuckingmill, St Breward, Cornwall, England
- Tuckingmill, Wiltshire, England
