= Stannon stone circle =

Stone circle on Bodmin Moor, Cornwall, England

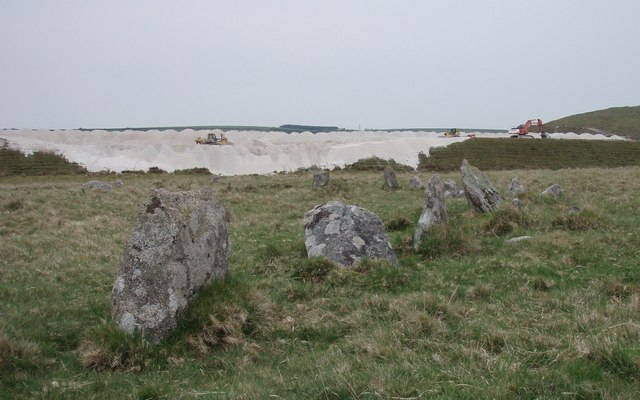

- Location within Cornwall
- 50.589546°N 4.650258°W
- Type: Stone circle
- Periods: Bronze Age
- Location: Bodmin Moor, Cornwall

Stannon stone circle (also known as Stannon circle or simply Stannon) is a stone circle located near St. Breward on Bodmin Moor in Cornwall, England.

== Description ==
Stannon takes its name from the nearby farm and is sited between two streams on the gentle slopes of Dinnever Hill, two and a half miles southeast of Camelford. It is overlooked on one side by a massive china clay works that now blights the landscape. The circle's remoteness is part of its charm with only the wild animals of the moor likely to be encountered.

Stannon stone circle is a fine example of a Cornish ring and contains 47 upright stones, 30 recumbent and 2 displaced regularly spaced within an impressive 42.6 metres (140 ft) by 40.5 metres (133 ft) metre circle with four outlying, jagged stones. The stones average size is around 0.5 metres (1.6 ft) with the largest stone in the group having a base width of over 1.2 metres (3.9 ft). Like Fernacre, Stannon is an example of Alexander Thom's Type A flattened circle, being noticeably flattened on the north side. The circle dates from either the late Neolithic or early Bronze Age. Aubrey Burl and contended that they may be earlier in date than other circles in the southern area of the moors such as the Stripple stones. John Barnatt suggested this dating and surveyed the site.

== Archaeology ==
Excavations in the area of Stannon Down were carried out by R. J. Mercer in the late 1960s. He was able to study eight unenclosed round house sites that were suggested to be a settlement of over twenty, approximately 6 metres (20 ft) to 8 metres (26 ft) metres in diameter covering an area of approximately 150 metres (490 ft) x 100 metres (330 ft) with fields for farming along with rectangular enclosures tentatively identified as corrals or used for stock control and have shown that the area would have been close to mixed oak woodlands and oaks would have grown in the area that would probably have been cleared in the first phases of settlement. Houses were constructed of posts, supporting thatched roofs, partitioned with wood with paved or compressed earth floors, incorporating drainage and furniture. Pottery, flint tools were discovered along with a whetstone that suggested the possibility of metal blades. The settlement was estimated to have a population of around one hundred people and dated to the Middle Bronze Age, a later date than suggested for the circle itself.

== Alignments ==
When standing in the supposed centre of Stannon Circle, a point between twenty-two and twenty-eight degrees north from east is marked by Rough Tor. Matthew Gregory Lewis found a relation of these monuments to the neighbouring hills which indicated that they were designed with special consideration of the position of the sunrise at certain times of year. Andy M. Jones reviews studies of the area and called Stannon a Ceremonial Complex.

== Literature ==
- William Borlase (1754). Observations on the antiquities, historical and monumental, of the county of Cornwall ...: Consisting of several essays on the first inhabitants, Druid-superstition, customs, and remains of the most remote antiquity, in Britain, and the British Isles ... With a summary of the religious, civil, and military state of Cornwall before the Norman Conquest ... Printed by W. Jackson, in the High-Strand.
- William Copeland Borlase (1872). Naenia Cornubiae: the cromlechs and tumuli of Cornwall. Llanerch. ISBN 978-1-897853-36-8.
- William C. Lukis (1885). The prehistoric stone monuments of the British Isles: Cornwall. Printed for Nichols and Sons for the Society of Antiquaries.
- Aubrey Burl (2005). A guide to the stone circles of Britain, Ireland and Brittany. Yale University Press. ISBN 978-0-300-11406-5.
- Mercer, R. J., The excavation of a Bronze Age hut-circle settlement, Stannon Down, St. Breward, Cornwall., Cornish Archaeology 9, pp. 17–46, 1968.
- Mercer, R. J. & Dimbleby, G. W., Pollen analysis and the hut circle settlement at Stannon Down., Cornish Archaeology 17, 1978.
