= Hanscom =

Hanscom may refer to:

- Adelaide Hanscom Leeson (1875–1931), an artist and photographer.
- Alfred H. Hanscom (1819 – c. 1880), a Speaker of the Michigan House of Representatives.
- Andrew J. Hanscom (1828–1907), a politician.
- Ben Hanscom, a character in the Steven King novel It.
- Dick Hanscom, a professional golfer.
- Elizabeth Deering Hanscom (1865–1960), American professor of English at Smith College
- Hanscom Smith, a career member of the US Senior Foreign Service.
- Moses C. Hanscom (1842-1873), a Medal of Honor recipient.

== See also ==
- Hanscom Air Force Base
- Hanscom Field
- Hanscom Park
- Hanscom Park United Methodist Church
- Hanscomb
- Hanscomb (surname)
