= De Lank Quarries =

Quarry and Site of Special Scientific Interest in Cornwall, England

Coordinates: 50.54655°N 4.68173°W

De Lank Quarries, Hantergantick
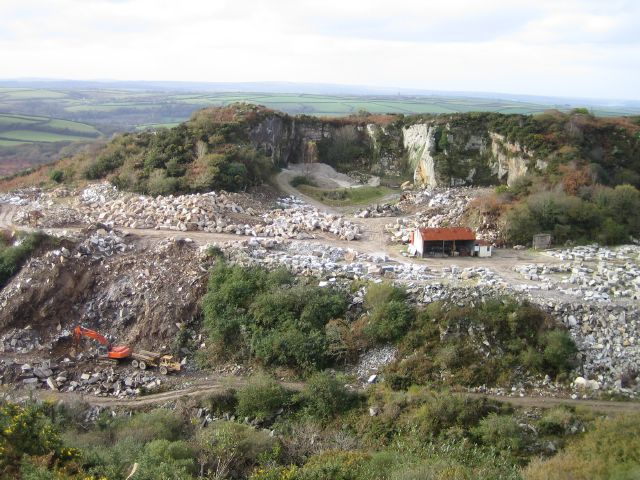
- Interactive map of De Lank Quarries, Hantergantick

De Lank Quarries (grid reference SX101753) is an active quarry and a 54-acre geological Site of Special Scientific Interest in St Breward parish, north Cornwall, England, UK. The quarry, which received its SSSI notification in 1994, takes its name from the nearby De Lank river. The quarry produces typical biotite granites and are of such quality that a slab now forms the base section of the reception desk at the Geological Society of London. Other notable structures built of De Lank granite are the fourth Eddystone Lighthouse, 1882; the Royal Opera House in Covent Garden, London and Portcullis House,the New Parliamentary Building in Whitehall, London

== Geology ==
De Lank quarry is located on the edge of the igneous rocks that form the majority of Bodmin moor, with the change to slate formations occurring less than 0.5 miles (0.80 km) to the west. The bedrock in the quarry is granite, predominantly biotite-bearing granites and aplogranite with some felsite intrusions.

== History ==
In the 1950s the quarry was owned by T W Ward & Son Ltd.

From the 1890s until 1950 there was a connection from the quarry to the Bodmin and Wadebridge railway at Wenfordbridge. To achieve this one of the sidings at Wenfordbridge extended on a sharp curve across a road and then over several fields before going down a rope-worked incline to the quarry below. Originally horses were used to haul wagons on this private line from Wenfordbridge, but between 1926 and 1950 it was worked by an 0-4-0 simplex locomotive. The incline had three rails with the centre rail common between the upward and downward lines, and worked on the balance principle with the weight of the wagons going down the slope acting to haul the upward-bound wagons. Use of the incline, and despatch of stone via the railway, ceased around 1940, although the line was not officially closed until 1950.

Within the quarry itself there was a 2 ft (610 mm) line which brought stone to the foot of the incline. In 1961 a small 0-4-0 petrol-engined locomotive was purchased from Tregoneeves Quarry near St Austell when it closed, and in 1963 an 0-4-0 diesel locomotive was also acquired. However neither the petrol locomotive, an Orenstein & Koppel of 1930s vintage, or the diesel appear to have been a success and both were scrapped in December 1965.
