= Crowdy Reservoir =

Reservoir in Cornwall, England

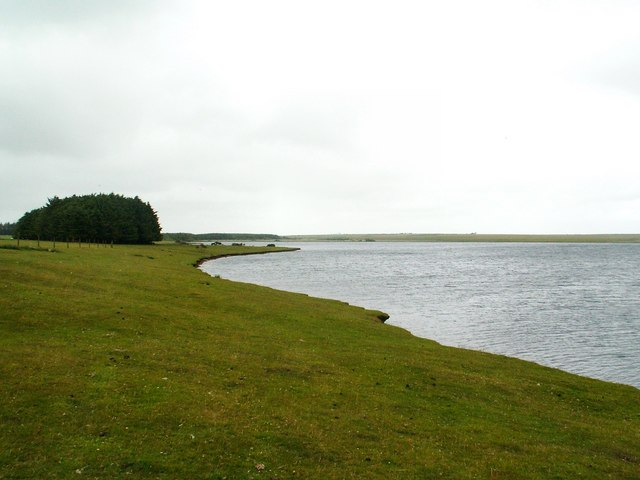

- Location within Cornwall
- Location: Cornwall
- Coordinates: 50°37′20″N 4°37′20″W
- Type: reservoir
- Basin countries: United Kingdom
- Surface area: 115 acres (47 ha)
- Average depth: 7.5 feet (2.3 m)

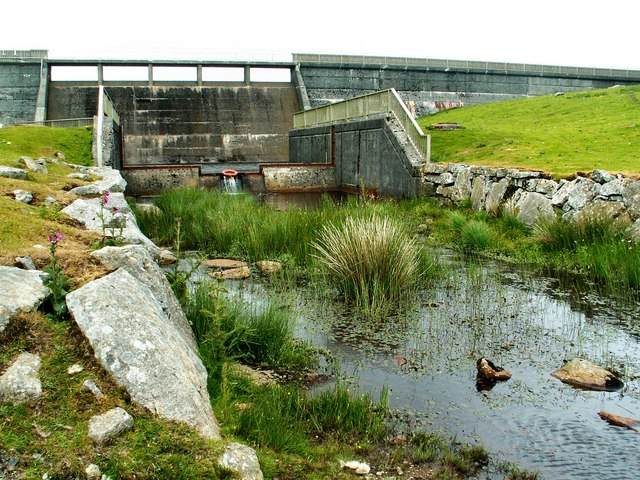
Crowdy Reservoir Dam.

Crowdy Reservoir is located on Bodmin Moor near Camelford in north Cornwall. It is currently managed jointly by the South West Lakes Trust and South West Water. There is public access to the reservoir away from the nature reserve. The reservoir supplies water to the North Cornwall water distribution network via treatment at the Lowermoor Water Treatment Works.

== History ==
The concrete dam was completed on Crowdy Marsh in 1973.

== Geography ==
Crowdy Reservoir is a reservoir on the northern edge of Bodmin Moor Cornwall. It is mostly in the civil parish of Advent and includes a small area in Davidstow parish and is fed by run-off and drainage from the surrounding moorland. The nearest town is Camelford 2 miles (3.2 km) to the east; Roughtor is 1 mile (1.6 km) to the south; Davidstow Moor on the east shore and to the north is the former Davidstow Airfield now partially covered by a Forestry England plantation, Davidstow Woods. The eastern two-thirds is within the Bodmin Moor, North Site of Special Scientific Interest (SSSI). The reservoir provides water to parts of North Cornwall.

== Natural history and ecology ==
Built on a marsh, the reservoir still retains a high degree of biological interest with a gradual transition from emergent vegetation with islets and peat to open water. Cornwall's only major colony of black-headed gull (Chroicocephalus ridibundus) breed here and a number wildfowl also breed or overwinter here. Some of the species include, gadwall (Anas strepera), goldeneye (Bucephala clangula), goosander (Mergus merganser), mallard (Anas platyrhynchos), common pochard (Aythya ferina), shoveller (Anas clypeata), teal (Anas crecca) and tufted duck (Aythya fuligula).

== See also ==
- List of reservoirs and dams in the United Kingdom
