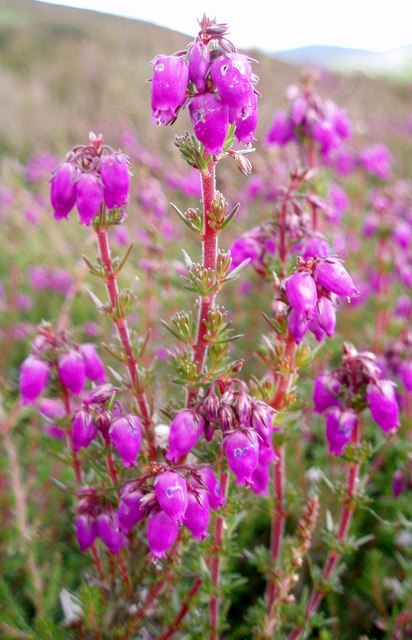

Conservation status
- Least Concern (IUCN 3.1)

Scientific classification
- Kingdom: Plantae
- Clade: Embryophytes
- Clade: Tracheophytes
- Clade: Angiosperms
- Clade: Eudicots
- Clade: Asterids
- Order: Ericales
- Family: Ericaceae
- Genus: Erica
- Species: E. cinerea

Binomial name
- Erica cinerea L.

= Erica cinerea =

Species of flowering plant in the heather family

Erica cinerea, the bell heather, is a species of flowering plant in the heath family Ericaceae, native to western and central Europe.

== Description ==
It is a low, spreading shrub growing to 15–60 centimetres (6–23 1/2 inches) tall, with fine needle-like leaves 4–8 millimetres (1/8–3/8 in) long arranged in whorls of three. The flowers are bell-shaped, purple (rarely white), 4–7 mm (1/8–1/4 in) long, produced in mid- to late summer. The flowers are dry, similar in texture to the strawflower.

== Etymology ==
The Latin specific epithet cinerea means "ash coloured".

== Distribution and habitat ==
E. cinerea is native to the west of Europe, where it is most abundant in Britain and Ireland, France, northern Spain and southern Norway. It also occurs in the Faroe Islands, Belgium, Germany, north-western Italy, and the Netherlands.

It mostly occurs on moors and heathland with relatively dry, acidic, nutrient poor soils. It occurs in coastal dune heath and dune slack and occasionally in woodland.

== Ecology ==
The plant provides a great deal of nectar for pollinators. It was rated in the top 5 for most nectar production (nectar per unit cover per year) in a UK plants survey conducted by the AgriLand project which is supported by the UK Insect Pollinators Initiative.

It is described as "of least concern" on the IUCN Red List of Threatened Species.

== Cultivation ==
It is grown as an ornamental plant, cultivated in a wider range of colors. It is drought-tolerant and grows well in full sun with well-drained soil. Like most heathers, it is a calcifuge and dislikes alkaline soils (e.g. calcareous) which cause the symptoms of iron deficiency. Like other cultivated heathers, it is often seen as groundcover among plantings of dwarf conifers.

These cultivars have gained the Royal Horticultural Society's Award of Garden Merit:

- 'C.D. Eason'
- 'Pink Ice'
- 'Stephen Davis'
- 'Velvet Night'

'Eden Valley' has lavender flowers shading to white at the base of the corolla and a prostrate habit. The original plant was found on Trink Hill, Cornwall, by Miss Gertrude Waterer.

== Uses ==
Bell heather is a source of heather honey.
