= Showery Tor =

Tor on Bodmin Moor, Cornwall, England

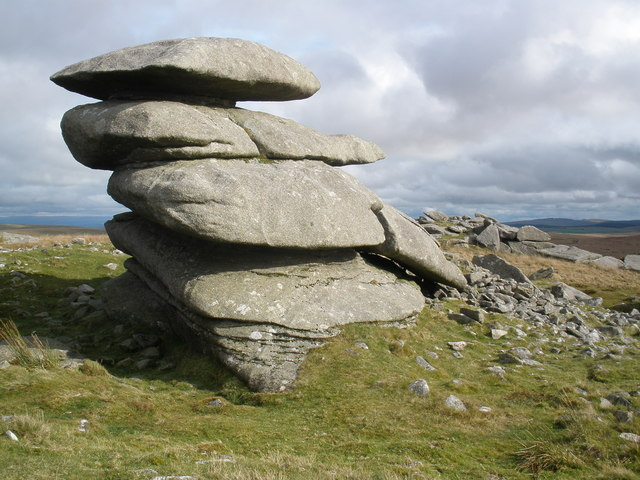
- Showery Tor Cairn and natural outcrop

- Location of Showery Tor within Cornwall Showery Tor (England)
- 50.601389°N 4.615833°W
- Location: near Camelford, Bodmin Moor, Cornwall

Site notes
- Architectural style: British pre-Roman Architecture

Showery Tor is a rocky outcrop on a ridge-top approximately 0.6 kilometres (0.37 mi) north of the Rough Tor summit, near Camelford on Bodmin Moor in Cornwall. It is notable for its rock formations and prehistoric monuments.

The Tor is a prominent landmark for a wide area. It consists of a natural 5-metre (16 ft) outcrop of weathered granite enveloped by a giant man-made ring cairn of stones, each up to 30 metres (98 ft) in diameter and 1.2 metres (3.9 ft) high. Christopher Tilley has estimated the height of the cairn on which the outcrop stands to be 3 metres (9.8 ft).

The site was thought to have been a religious focal point, possibly from the Neolithic or Bronze Age period. No excavations have been recorded at the site, and it is not known if any burials were made there.

The granite outcrop is reminiscent of the Cheesewring and made of individual blocks on underlying outcrops formed by erosion along horizontal fractures in the granitic mass. Aerial photography has revealed more about the layout of the structures on Showery Tor and it stands out as the only natural formation to have been used in this way by the cairn designers.

== Pictures ==
Showery Tor
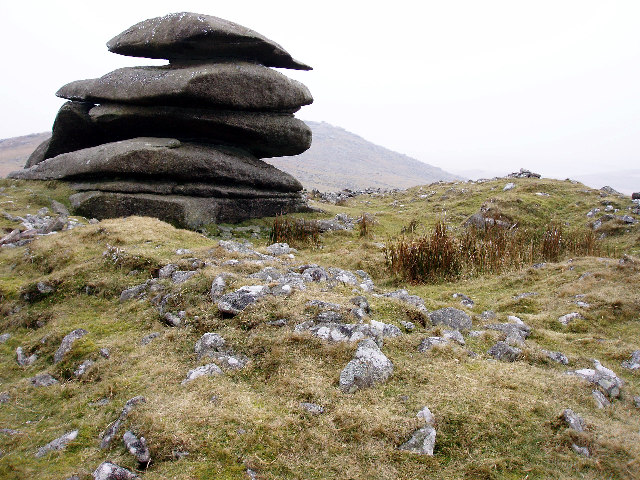
Showery Tor Ring Cairn

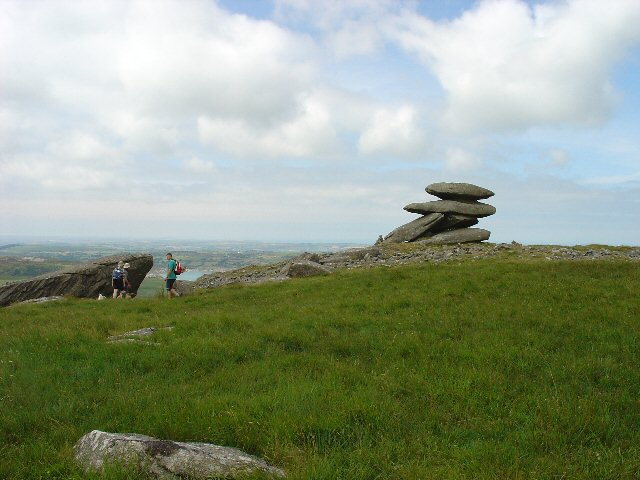
Cairn from a distance

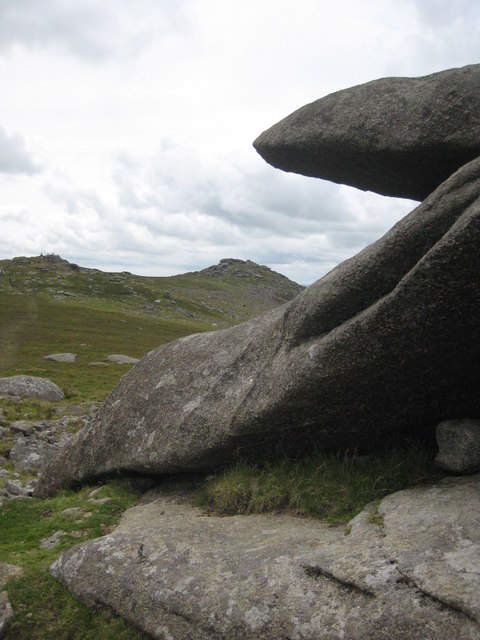
View towards Rough Tor from Showery Tor Cairn

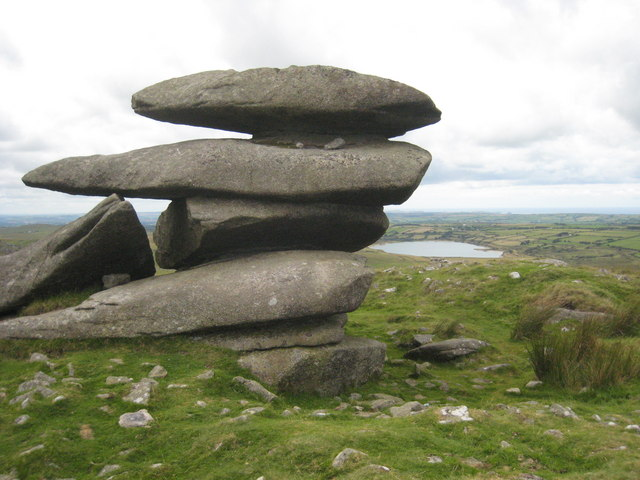
Another view from Showery Tor

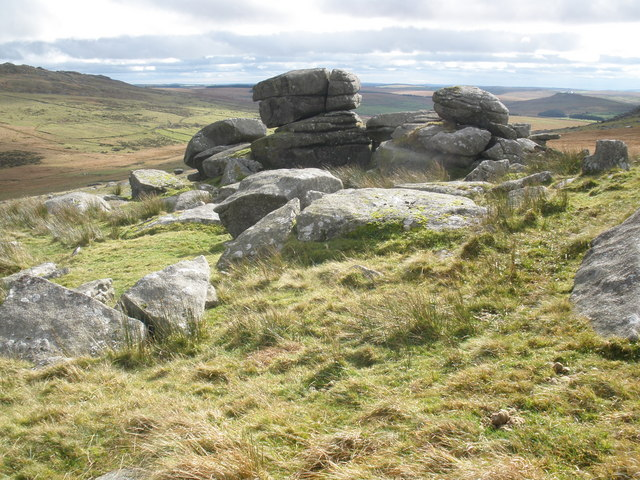
Granite boulders on Showery Tor

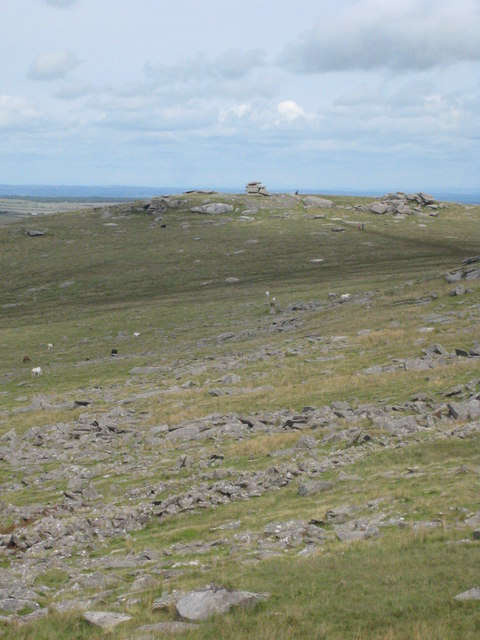
View towards Showery Tor and Little Rough Tor from Rough Tor
