= De Lank River =

River in north Cornwall, England

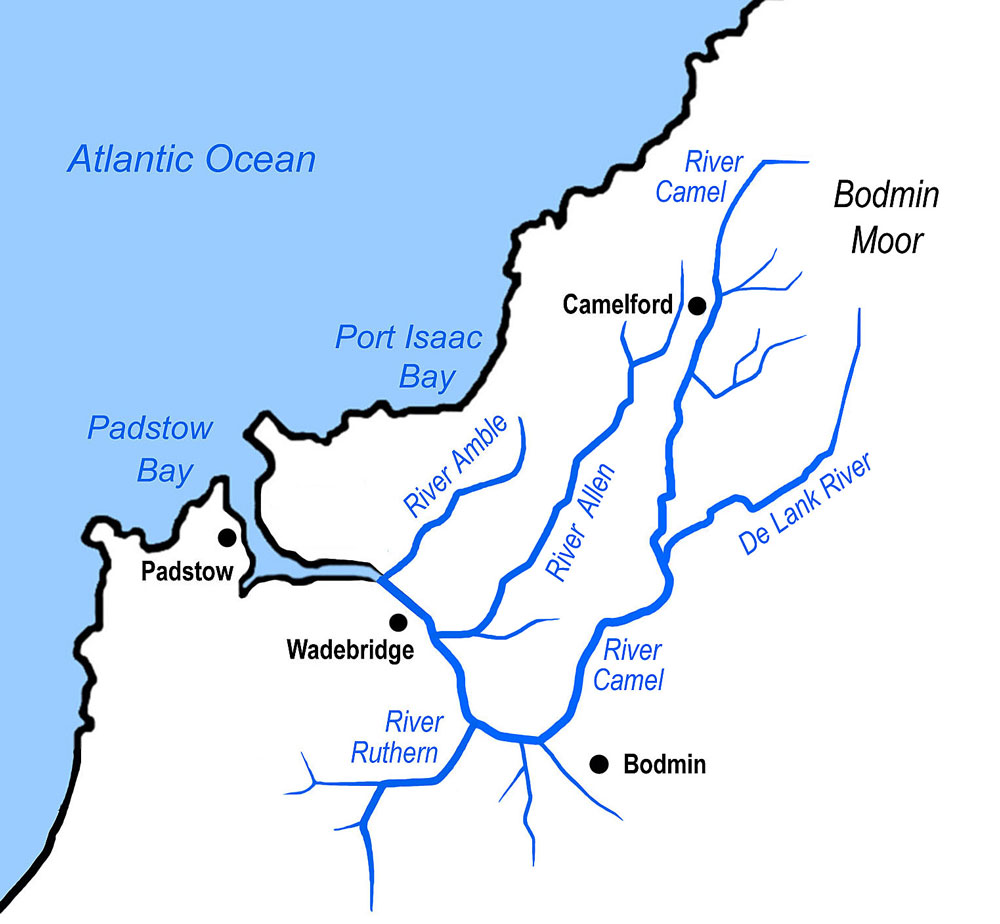
Sketch map showing the De Lank River as a tributary of the River Camel

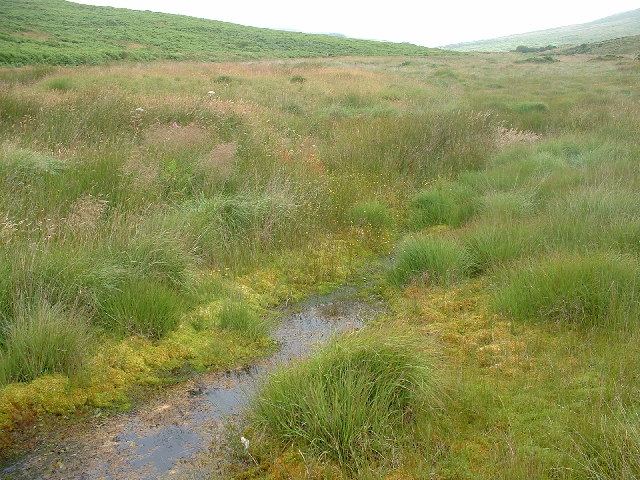
The De Lank River at Garrow Tor

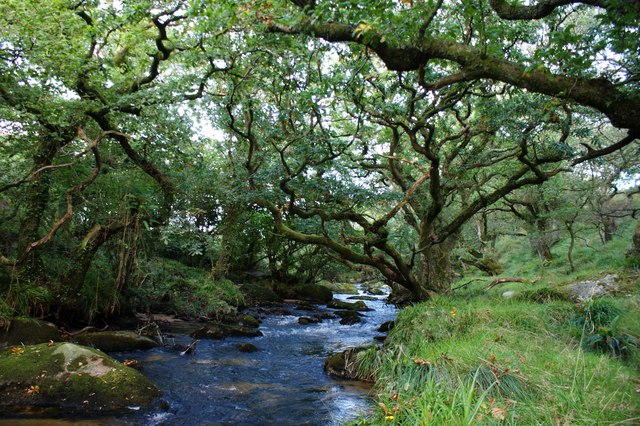
The De Lank River near Hantergantick

The De Lank River (Cornish: Dowr Dinlonk, meaning ravine fort river) is a small river in north Cornwall, England. It is a tributary of the River Camel and is approximately nine miles (14 km) long from its source on Bodmin Moor to its confluence with the Camel two miles (3.2 km) south of St Breward.

The De Lank River springs from Rough Tor Marsh between the two highest peaks on Bodmin Moor, Rough Tor and Brown Willy. Initially, its course is south between the peaks before turning southwest, past the southern foot of Garrow Tor, heading for the Camel. The De Lank's course is within the civil parish of St Breward.

The river flows through an isolated area with few riverside settlements. Its upper reaches cross a bare moorland plateau and its lower reaches are characterised by ancient deciduous woodland. At Lank, near the confluence with the River Camel, the river flows through De Lank Quarries (the site of a Geological SSSI).

The De Lank River is an important wildlife habitat noted for diverse and abundant flora and fauna. Together with the River Camel, the De Lank is an important habitat for the otter which is present along the whole length of the river. The De Lank is included in the Camel Special Area of Conservation (SAC) and River Camel SSSI.

== Location ==
- Source coordinates 50.60852°N 4.61314°W OS grid reference SX155816
- Confluence coordinates 50.52933°N 4.70387°W OS grid reference SX084734
