= Camelford water pollution incident =

1988 mass poisoning in England

Coordinates: 50.617°N 4.683°W

Camelford shown within Cornwall.

The Camelford water pollution incident involved the accidental contamination of the drinking water supply to the town of Camelford, Cornwall, in July 1988. Twenty tonnes of aluminium sulphate was inadvertently added to the water supply, raising the concentration to 3,000 times the permissible level. As the aluminium sulphate broke down it produced several tonnes of sulphuric acid which "stripped a cocktail of chemicals from the pipe networks as well as lead and copper piping in people's homes." Many people who came into contact with the contaminated water experienced a range of short-term health effects, and many victims suffered long-term effects whose implications remained unclear as of 2012. There has been no rigorous examination or monitoring of the health of the victims since the incident, which is Britain's worst mass poisoning event. Inquests on people who died many years later found very high levels of aluminium in the brain. Dame Barbara Clayton led a Royal Commission on Environmental Pollution enquiry into the incident.

Immediately after the contamination the authorities said that the water was safe to drink, possibly with juice to cover the unpleasant taste. In an inquest in 2012 into the death of one of the victims, the coroner stated that South West Water Authority had been "gambling with as many as 20,000 lives" when they failed to inform the public about the poisoning for 16 days, a delay he called unacceptable. In the aftermath of the contamination the public were reassured that there was no risk to health. There were allegations of a cover-up and West Somerset Coroner Michael Rose stated: "I found there was a deliberate policy to not advise the public of the true nature until some 16 days after the occurrence of the incident." Following an investigation by the government's Committee on Toxicity of Chemicals in Food, Consumer Products and the Environment, Michael Meacher, the former Environment Minister, claimed that "various associated bodies tried to bury the inquiry from the start." Meacher told one newspaper: "This has become a tug of war between the truth and an attempt to silence the truth."

An April 2013 report by the Lowermoor subgroup of the Committee on Toxicity of Chemicals in Food, Consumer Products and the Environment concluded that exposure to the chemicals was unlikely to cause "delayed or persistent harm" and was also unlikely to cause future ill health. In September 2013 the government admitted that there had been a "manifest failure to give prompt appropriate advice and information to affected consumers" and offered an unreserved apology.

== Cause ==
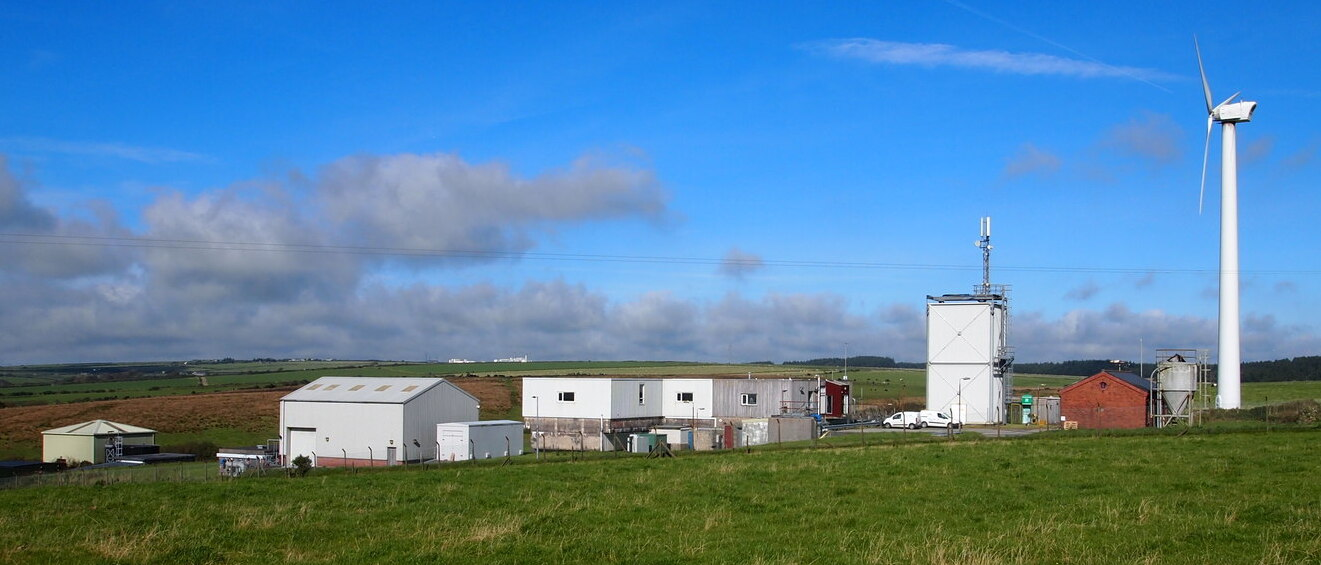
Lowermoor Water Treatment Works, where the contamination originated

On 6 July 1988, John Stephens, a relief tanker driver working for ISC Chemicals, a Bristol-based subsidiary of Rio Tinto Zinc, arrived at Lowermoor Water Treatment Works on Bodmin Moor and found it unmanned. Being unfamiliar with the location, Stephens had been given a key by another driver and told simply that "once inside the gate, the aluminium sulphate tank is on the left". However, the key fitted almost every lock used by the South West Water Authority (SWWA). After twenty minutes looking for the correct tank Stephens tried the key on a manhole cover and when it unlocked believed he had accessed the correct tank. He poured the load of 20 tonnes of aluminium sulphate, used to remove solid particles from raw water, into the tank, which actually held treated water prior to distribution to the consumers in Camelford. This immediately contaminated the water supply to 20,000 local people and up to 10,000 tourists. The maximum recorded aluminium concentration was 620 milligrams per litre compared with the maximum concentration admissible at the time by the European Community of 0.2 milligrams per litre.

== Response ==
For several days the water authority insisted the water was safe, and should be mixed with orange juice to disguise the taste of the as yet unknown contaminant. One customer who telephoned the authority the day after the contamination was told "there had been some acidity, but the water was perfectly safe to drink," and was no more harmful than lemon juice. On 14 July 1988 the authority sent a circular letter to all customers "asserting that the water from the treatment works was of the right alkalinity and was safe to use and drink." Within two days, the authority suspected the source of the contamination was the erroneous delivery, which was confirmed on 12 July when the driver was asked to return to the treatment works. However, it was not until ten days later on 22 July that the authority's chairman Keith Court authorised a public notice, containing the first mention of the aluminium sulphate, to be published in the sports section of a local newspaper, the Western Morning News. Stephens stated that after the site meeting where he confirmed he had delivered the chemical to the wrong tank he was told by the authority "not to mention it to anyone else". The SWWA district manager, John Lewis, said they had realised within 48 hours that aluminium sulphate was the likely cause of the contamination, but Lewis said he had been instructed by Leslie Nicks, the head of operations, not to tell the public.

Douglas Cross, a consultant biologist based in Camelford, tested the water and found that it contained "not only aluminium sulphate but other noxious substances, too. As the acidic liquid travelled from the plant into people's homes, it corroded the copper pipes and their soldered joints, made of zinc and lead." Official advice to boil the water before drinking was, according to Cross, "dangerous advice because it concentrates the contaminants. They kept flushing the pipes out for months after the incident. This will have stirred up debris in the bends and only have lengthened the amount of time the water was coming through the taps with all sorts of metals in it."

Sixty-thousand (60,000) salmon and trout were killed in the Camel and Allen rivers during the flushing out process. The contamination was compounded by the failure of the authority to carry out the required six-monthly cleaning of the tank, which had not been cleaned for three years, leading to a build up of sludge.

A month after the contamination, Michael Waring at the Department of Health (DH) wrote to every doctor in Cornwall saying that, "although he had no detailed information on what was exactly in the water or how much people might have drunk, he could assure them that no lasting ill effects would result." G. K. Matthews, a senior toxicologist at the DH, suggested a team of medical experts should be sent to the area immediately, but a month later said he had been "overruled". The National Union of Public Employees said that the procedure by which the driver had access to the site was common through the region and that they believed this was connected with reduced staffing levels and privatisation plans. They added that they were concerned about the three-week delay in reporting what had happened, and that SWWA district manager John Lewis had been "instructed at a very high level to say nothing". Lewis (not a member of the union) had been dismissed; the union said, "To single him out is unfair."

== Reports and inquiries ==
In August 1988 a highly critical report by Dr John Lawrence, a senior ICI scientist and non-executive member of the water authority, blamed lax procedures. He also criticised communication failures which kept information from the public.

=== Lowermoor Incident Health Advisory Group report ===
The Lowermoor Incident Health Advisory Group (LIHAG) was set up in January 1989 to provide expert advice to the Cornwall and Isles of Scilly District Health Authority on the health implications for the population of the Camelford area. In 1989 the LIHAG reported that there was no convincing evidence of a harmful build-up of aluminium and that there was no increase in ill health from poisoned water. A further enquiry by the same group in 1991 acknowledged the affair had caused "real suffering" in the community. However, Dame Barbara Clayton concluded that this was because of sensational reporting of the incident. She stated that "In our judgment it is likely that these symptoms would have occurred in the normal course of events," and the symptoms were wrongly attributed to the contamination because of "inaccurate and exaggerated" claims of health damage by scientists and the news media. When the Clayton report was released in July 1989, it caused "outrage in Camelford and wide disbelief in the scientific community." One section was later amended to read "alarming statements by pseudo-scientists" rather than "...by some scientists".

=== COT Lowermoor Subgroup report ===
In June 2000 Environment minister Michael Meacher announced that there would not be an independent public inquiry, and declared "All the facts are fully known and there is no reason to believe that a public inquiry could add to that." In November 2000 the Environmental Law Centre prepared a petition to the European Parliament calling for a Brussels-based inquiry. On 14 August 2001 the government announced that an investigation – although not a full public inquiry – into the incident would take place. The investigation was to be undertaken by the newly formed Lowermoor Subgroup (LSG) consisting of scientific and health experts and local resident representatives, chaired by Frank Woods, a professor of medicine at the University of Sheffield. Woods was also the head of the government's Committee on Toxicity of Chemicals in Food, Consumer Products and the Environment (COT), of which the Lowermoor team was a subgroup. Its remit was to advise on whether the incident had caused, or was expected to cause, long-term harm to human health and examine whether the existing programme of monitoring and research into the human health effects was sufficient.

==== 2005 draft report ====
A draft report, published on 26 January 2005, was inconclusive, saying that the long-term health effects on the population were still unknown and that there was insufficient scientific information available to determine whether the health problems being experienced were caused by the contamination. Woods called for further studies and said: "We will be putting the strongest possible case to the minister. I believe carrying out that work is important, it is not something which should be dropped and pushed aside."

The following year, Meacher made several criticisms of the group:

- the requirement to examine the DoH's handling of the incident was removed from the terms of reference
- no independent expert on aluminium toxicology was included in the working group
- an attempt was made to include Waring as medical adviser to the group, even though he was the author of the original letter stating that no lasting ill effects would result
- no objective testing of the exposed population was carried out
- too much reliance was placed on the water sample analysis from the South-West Water Authority, the compromised party
- the amount of sludge reported to have been in the contact tank at the time was ignored
- experts were drawn on who had potentially vested interests in the aluminium industry
- the DoH pre-released a highly misleading statement of the findings two days before the draft report was due to be made public
- the executive summary, prepared without the group's approval, and which effectively concluded that the illnesses reported bore no connection with the water poisoning, was "misleading and biased".

Two members of the LSG committee claimed in December 2007 that the DoH had known from the start that some people were at especially high risk from aluminium poisoning but deliberately suppressed this evidence to protect the government's plans for water privatisation.

==== 2013 final report ====
The final report was published in April 2013, and concluded that it was unlikely that the exposure to chemicals could have caused long-term health problems. Key findings of the report include:

- there is no evidence that the combination of metals which occurred as a result of the incident could have caused delayed health effects
- there was an increase in childhood infections in the area, but this increase occurred before the pollution incident
- a study of cancer incidence and mortality showed that there was no increase in cancer incidence in the area after the pollution incident
- a dermatologist investigated skin and nail problems reported by individuals affected by the incident, and reported that the problems are similar to those experienced by the general population
- there is no evidence that the contaminants can cause joint or muscle pain and/or swelling, and these complaints are common in the general population
- a Camelford resident who died of severe cerebral amyloid angiopathy was found to have higher than normal aluminium concentrations in the brain during an autopsy. However samples from the brain of a patient with similar neuropathology but unknown aluminium exposure found similar higher than usual concentrations. Research commissioned by the coroner compared 60 postmortem brains and found no correlation between aluminium or iron concentrations and the level of congophilic angiopathy or senile plaques

== Health effects ==
=== Short-term ===
A diverse array of short-term health effects was reported by members of the public who either drank the contaminated water or came into contact with it while bathing. These included:

- urinary complaints,
- blistering and peeling of skin,
- hair turning blue or green,
- diarrhoea and vomiting
- joint pains.

=== Long-term ===
A 1999 report in the British Medical Journal concluded that some victims had suffered "considerable damage" to their brain function. This contradicted the 1991 LIHAG report telling residents that their symptoms were due to anxiety. The study was led by a consultant nephrologist at John Radcliffe Hospital, Oxford, and was the first large-scale clinical study of the affected residents. The report stated that their symptoms were similar to those of Alzheimer's disease, which has also been linked with large quantities of aluminium accumulating in the brain. Rejecting the findings of the LIG, the report called for further research to determine the longer term prognosis for the affected individuals and led to fresh calls for a public inquiry into the pollution incident. Although the study was carried out in 1991, its publication was delayed by the ongoing litigation between SWWA and the victims.

Victims have reported:

- fatigue,
- fibromyalgia,
- premature ageing,
- loss of short-term memory, and
- multiple chemical sensitivity.

Seven months after the contamination, one victim underwent a bone biopsy which "found a ring of aluminium like the rings you see in trees" that could not have resulted from normal aluminium absorption.

=== Later deaths of victims ===
The husband of Carol Cross, who died of a rare form of dementia in 2004, said in 2006 that he believed that his wife and twenty other people had died as a result of the disaster, and that more cases were emerging.

Victim Sarah Sillifant, who was in her twenties when she was exposed, hanged herself in 2005 after suffering dementia and other symptoms similar to those experienced by Carol Cross. In June 2007, Irene Neal, who lived in Rock, near Camelford at the time of the incident, died aged 91. A post-mortem examination found an "unacceptable amount of aluminium in the brain".

==== Carol Cross ====
In 2006 a post-mortem inquest into the death of Carol Cross at age 58, who was exposed to the contaminated drinking water aged 44, showed that her brain contained 23 micrograms of aluminium per gram of brain, compared to the normal brain levels of 0–2 micrograms per gram. Her death was caused by a form of early-onset beta amyloid angiopathy, a cerebro-vascular disease usually associated with Alzheimer's, which could be connected to the abnormally high level of aluminium in her brain. Michael Rose, the West Somerset Coroner, said of the findings: "Further research will be needed before the significance of the elevated brain aluminium concentration in this case can be clarified. A scientific report on the case has been submitted for publication." Daniel Perl, of New York's Mount Sinai School of Medicine said: "If additional similar cases were to appear among the 20,000 exposed individuals then the implications of this incident would become extremely important. Only time will tell. At the very least, increased efforts towards surveillance of individuals exposed in Camelford is certainly warranted."

Rose had adjourned the inquests for Cross and Neal pending further studies, but in 2008 said the Government had refused "to either finance or assist" research to test the hypothesis of a link between exposure to aluminium and congophilic amyloid angiopathy. He said this research was necessary to determine the consequences of the deceased having such a high level of aluminium. He later sought support from Somerset County Council so that the work could go ahead and once more adjourned the inquest into the death of Carol Cross, although Neal's inquest went ahead.

In July 2009 Rose announced that the inquest into Cross's death would resume in November 2010. Rose said that "ongoing medical research would not be completed until late summer" 2010. He explained "This research is necessary to prove whether or not the high level of aluminium in Mrs Cross's brain causing her death through beta amyloid angiopathy (a form of cerebrovascular disease) on 19 February 2004, could be attributed to the aluminium sulphate placed in the public water supply at Lowermoor treatment works on 6 July 1988. This is the last adjournment I am able to agree and the inquest will commence on Monday 1 November 2010 at Taunton."

When the inquest was reconvened Dr. Chris Exley, a reader in bioinorganic chemistry at Keele University, said "The brain aluminium concentration was so high that it is highly likely that it contributed to her brain pathology, probably being responsible for the aggressive form and very early onset of the disease." Neuropathologist Prof. Margaret Esiri, from the John Radcliffe Hospital, said "I have never seen a case such as this at this age. I have seen one case in a woman who died aged 81 but the literature shows only a handful of cases worldwide." As a result of their evidence the inquest was again adjourned to allow South West Water Authority time to seek its own expert evidence.

Carol Cross's inquest was finally completed in March 2012. The coroner returned a narrative verdict recording the circumstances without attributing the cause, in which he said the water supply company, South West Water Authority had been "gambling with as many as 20,000 lives" when they failed to inform the public about the poisoning for 16 days, a delay he called unacceptable. An expert said at the inquest that the levels of aluminium in her brain were "beyond belief".

Rose stated: "I found there was a deliberate policy to not advise the public of the true nature until some 16 days after the occurrence of the incident," and that "[T]he failure of the authority to visit every house after the incident to advise them to thoroughly flush their systems [w]as a serious dereliction of duty. I can say that the incident may either have contributed to or possibly caused Mrs Cross's death, but I do not have sufficient evidence to say so conclusively."

== Legal actions against South West Water Authority ==
In 1991 the South West Water Authority was fined £10,000 and ordered to pay £25,000 costs at Exeter Crown Court for supplying water likely to endanger public health. The authority paid at least £123,000 to settle almost 500 initial compensation claims and in 1997 a further 148 victims accepted out-of-court damages totalling almost £400,000, approved by a High Court judge sitting in Truro. The settlements ranged from £680 to £10,000. Some later claimed they were "railroaded" into accepting the out-of-court settlements after being told that their legal aid funding would be withdrawn if they continued with the lawsuit. The judge, Mr Justice Wright, said: "If the case had been contested, there would have been awesomely complex argument over how much [water] they consumed" and that they were "extraordinarily well advised to accept the offer." Cross later said: "The official medical claim from the health authority was that there was no known pathway for aluminium to be absorbed into the body. I would argue that this was a misrepresentation of scientific facts, however it was accepted by the judge [and he] instructed the jury that medical damages could not be awarded. The victims therefore received negligible compensation. This alone is adequate reason for a judicial review, since it resulted in a miscarriage of justice for the victims."

== Allegations of a cover-up ==
On 13 December 2007 Michael Rose announced that, in light of "a possible attempt to initially suppress the seriousness of the incident, I am asking the chief constable of Devon and Cornwall to hand me evidence gathered at the time of the original investigation," and for the chief constable to appoint a senior detective "to look into the allegations of a possible cover-up."

At the time of the incident the water industry was about to be privatised by the Conservative government of the day; a letter written from a water official to Michael Howard, then Minister of State for Water and Planning, emerged which stated that a police investigation into the poisoning incident was viewed as "very distracting" and that any subsequent prosecution of South West Water would also "be totally unhelpful to privatisation... and render the whole of the water industry unattractive to the City". The Western Morning News, using a Freedom of Information Act request, uncovered a briefing note to the then Environment Minister, Nicholas Ridley, warning: "Those of the South West board with a commercial background are deeply concerned by the investigation." There was speculation in the news media that commercial concerns were given priority over public health.

The former North Cornwall Liberal Democrat Member of Parliament (MP) Paul Tyler also uncovered documents contradicting the water authority's claim that it had advised consumers not to drink the water, and that this advice had been given in a radio broadcast at 6 am on 7 July 1988 and subsequently. The documents, relating to the prosecution of South West Water, alleged that this "was not the advice given to the public on the 6th, 7th, 8th, or indeed on the 12th," and added that the prosecution would say that the authority "misled Mr Healey (the head of the drinking water division at the Department of Environment)... There is evidence that a deliberate decision was made to conceal the truth from the public." Tyler said "I can't think of any comparable accident or mistake anywhere in Britain, particularly one involving what was a government agency, where there was no attempt to investigate what went wrong and why."

In 2001 Environment Minister Michael Meacher claimed that the Government feared what an unrestricted inquiry might find, and that "There was then a great deal of shenanigans about the terms of reference and fighting at all levels in order to limit the ambit of the committee to get the result they wanted. This inquiry was always potentially hugely damaging and hugely worrying to the establishment in terms of the way they handled the incident and clearly there are elements that want to shut it down." No named individuals were ever prosecuted. The national water industry was sold, under the Conservative government, for £3.59 billion, with the sale of South West Water Authority raising around £300 million.

== See also ==
- Armley asbestos disaster
- Love Canal
- Sydney Tar Ponds
- Cancer Alley
- Abbeystead disaster
