= Brian Hanscomb =

English Artist

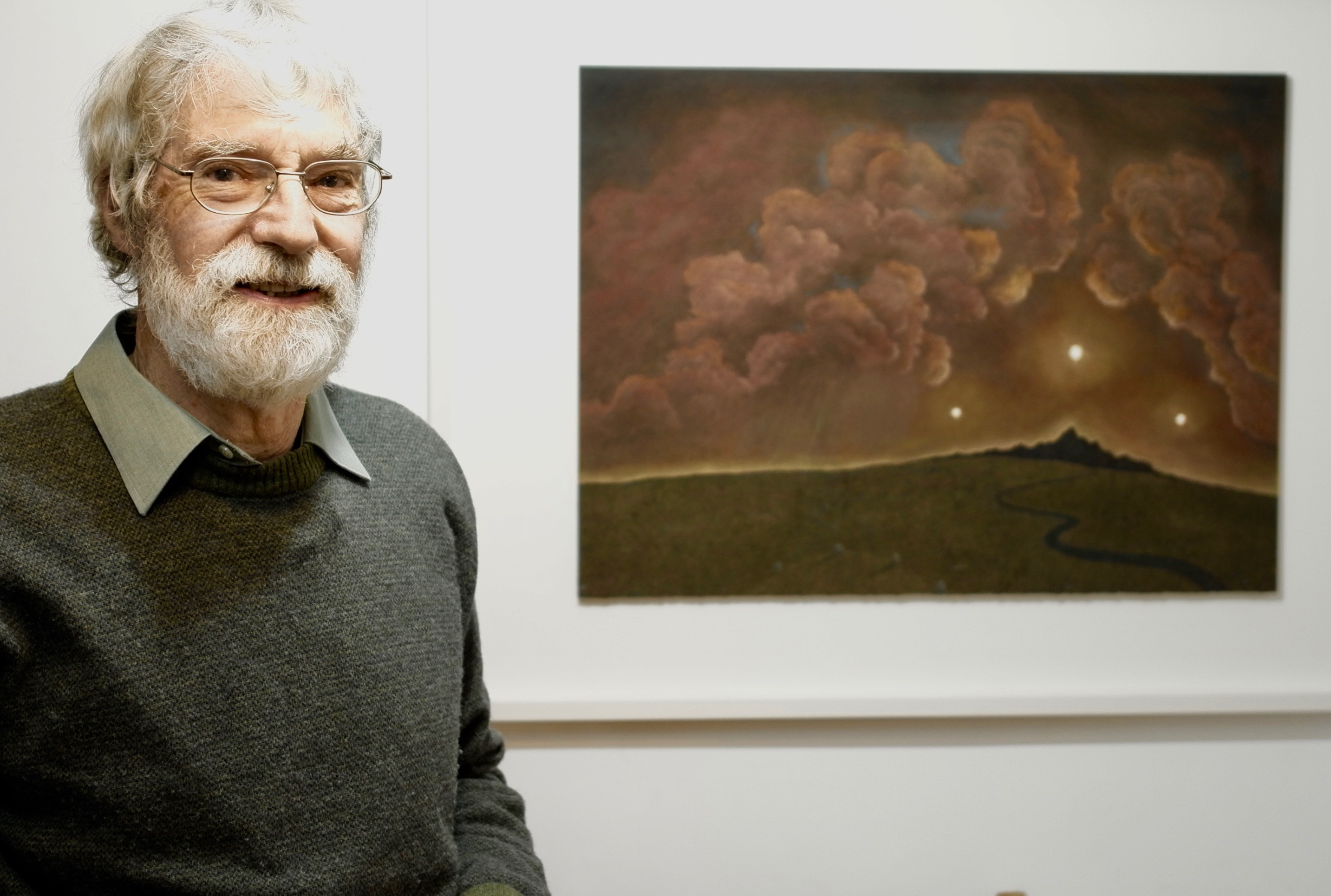
- Brian Hanscomb at the Terre Verte gallery Altarnun 2019
- Born: 1944 (age 80–81)
- Occupation: Artist engraver
- Spouse: Married

Brian Hanscomb is an artist engraver from St Breward, Cornwall.

Brian Hanscomb was born in 1944 at Croxley Green, Hertfordshire. His work is inspired by Quakerism, Zen Buddhism and Bodmin Moor. He served an apprenticeship in letterpress engraving and also trained as a gravure engraver.

His work is in the Government Art Collection, New York Public Library the Science Museum, London and the National Gallery of Australia. Hanscomb is a Fellow of the Royal Society of Painter-Printmakers.

In 2010 Resurgence magazine described Hanscomb as "Britain's leading copperplate engraver".

== Books ==
- illustrator for Oxley, William, The Mansands Trilogy. Richmond, Surrey: The Keepsake Press, 1988 ISBN 0901924776
- Sun, Sea & Earth Whittington Press, 1989 ISBN 185428004X
- Cornwall; an Interior Vision: copper-engravings & texts Whittington Press, 1992
- The Phoenix: copper-engravings & haiku Whittington Press, 2005
