= Tuckingmill, St Breward, Cornwall =

Hamlet in St Breward, Cornwall, England

Coordinates: 50°34′09″N 4°41′52″W

Tuckingmill is a small hamlet near St Breward, Cornwall. It is located within the parish of St. Breward. It contains a number of properties including a former reading room.
