= Lowermoor Water Treatment Works =

Treatment facility in Cornwall, England

Coordinates: 50°37′N 4°40′W

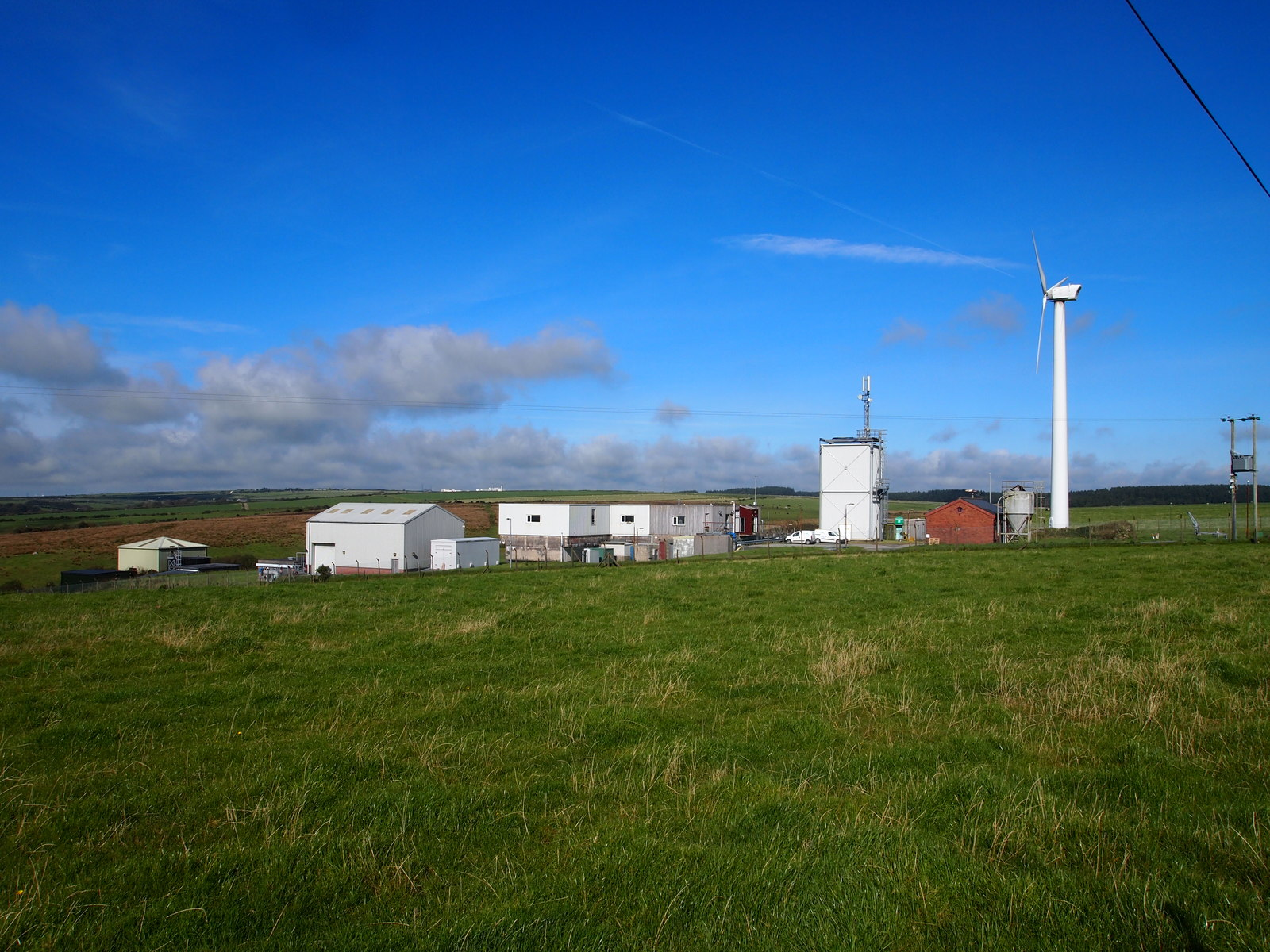
Lowermoor Water Treatment Works, in 2017

The Lowermoor Water Treatment Works supplies drinking water to the north Cornwall water distribution network. Raw water is obtained from the Crowdy Reservoir, which is 3/4 mile to the north east, and which is filled predominantly by run-off and drainage from surrounding moorland. The works were constructed in 1973.

At the time of the Camelford water pollution incident, water treatment was being carried out by South West Water.
