= Trink Hill =

Hill in west Cornwall, England

Coordinates: 50.18121°N 5.497563°W

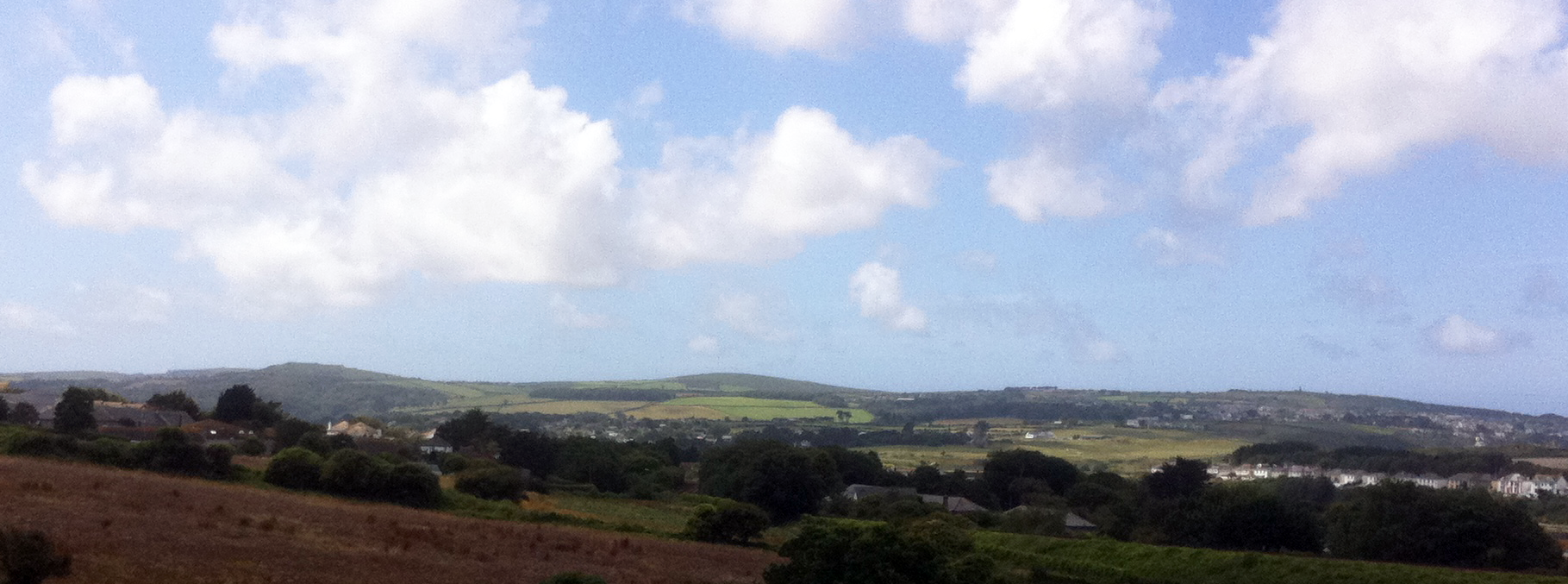
View of Trencrom Hill, Trink Hill and Worvas Hill (Knill's Monument) from Hayle

Trink Hill (Cornish: Karn Boslenwow, meaning tor of a dwelling with strips of land) is a 212-metre-high hill that lies between the hamlets of Trink (Cornish: Trefrynk) and Cripplesease, near to the village of Nancledra (Cornish: Nanskledri). Trencrom Hill (Cornish: Torr Krobm) lies one kilometre to the South East.

== Location ==
(grid reference SW504371), Landranger Map Number: 203 Latitude: 50.181219N Longitude: 5.497563W

== History ==
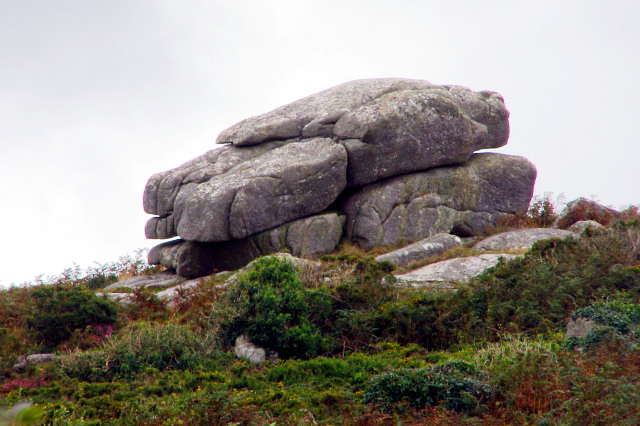
Twelve O'Clock rock, Trink Hill

A Round barrow exists at the summit, an OS Trig point within it.

A stone named after the nearby Giew Mine (or Trink Hill menhir) stands on the western slope of the hill.

Twelve O'Clock Rock (Cornish: Men Hanter-nos) is a granite outcrop, supposed to be an unusual logan stone in that it can only be rocked at midnight.

Wheal Sister mine, covering both Trencrom and Trink hills was a consolidation of four tin mines in October 1875. The mines were previously known as Wheals Kitty, Margaret, Mary and Trencrom.

There is a covering of bell heather (Erica cinerea) on the hill and in 1926 Miss Gertrude Waterer found a variety with a prostrate habit and lavender flowers. It was commercially introduced by Knap Hill Nursery's in 1933 and awarded a Royal Horticultural Society's Award of Merit in the same year and in 1984 a Garden Merit.
