= Moses C. Hanscom =

American Civil War Medal of Honor recipient (1842–1873)

- Born: 1842; Danville, Maine
- Died: 1873 (aged 30–31)
- Burial place: Auburn, Maine
- Military career
- Allegiance: United States
- Branch: United States Army
- Rank: Corporal
- Units: Company F, 19th Maine Volunteer Infantry Regiment
- Conflicts: American Civil War; Battle of Bristoe Station
- Awards: Medal of Honor

Moses C. Hanscom (1842 – July 26, 1873) was a Union Army soldier in the American Civil War who received the U.S. military's highest decoration, the Medal of Honor.

Hanscom was born in 1842 in Danville, Maine and entered service at Bowdoinham, Maine. He was awarded the Medal of Honor, for extraordinary heroism shown on October 14, 1863, at the Battle of Bristoe Station, while serving as a corporal with Company F, 19th Maine Volunteer Infantry Regiment. His Medal of Honor was issued on December 1, 1864, and is on display at the Maine State Museum.

Hanscom died at the age of 30, on July 26, 1873, and was buried at Oak Hill Cemetery in Auburn, Maine.

== Medal of Honor citation ==
The President of the United States of America, in the name of Congress, takes pleasure in presenting the Medal of Honor to Corporal Moses C. Hanscom, United States Army, for extraordinary heroism on 14 October 1863, while serving with Company F, 19th Maine Infantry, in action at Bristoe Station, Virginia, for capture of the flag of 26th North Carolina (Confederate States of America).

== See also ==
- Battle of Bristoe Station
- Battle of Gettysburg
- 19th Maine Volunteer Infantry Regiment

== Bibliography ==
- Civilwarhome - Gettysburg Union order of battle
- Civil War Trust - Gettysburg Union order of battle
- Dyer, Frederick H. (1908). A Compendium of the War of the Rebellion. Des Moines, IA: Dyer Pub. Co. ASIN B01BUFJ76Q.
- Eicher, David J. (2002). The Longest Night: A Military History of the Civil War. New York, NY: Simon & Schuster. ISBN 978-0684849454.
- Eicher, John H. "Gettysburg Order of Battle" at Gettysburg Discussion Group website.
- Gettysburg Discussion Group - Union order of battle
- Gettysburg National Military Park - The Army of the Potomac at Gettysburg
- Huntington, Tom (2018). Maine Roads to Gettysburg: How Joshua Chamberlain, Oliver Howard, and 4,000 Men from the Pine Tree State Helped Win the Civil War's Bloodiest Battle. Mechanicsburg, PA: Stackpole Books. ISBN 978-0-8117-1840-0..
- Tighe, Adrian (13 August 2013). The Bristoe Campaign: General Lee's Last Strategic Offensive with the Army of Northern Virginia- October 1863. Xlibris Corporation. ISBN 978-1-4568-8870-1.
- U.S. War Department, The War of the Rebellion: a Compilation of the Official Records of the Union and Confederate Armies. Washington, D.C.: U.S. Government Printing Office, 1880–1901.
