= Trencrom Hill =

Hillfort in Cornwall, England

Coordinates: 50.1736°N 5.4776°W

- Torr Krobm (Cornish)
- Trecrobben
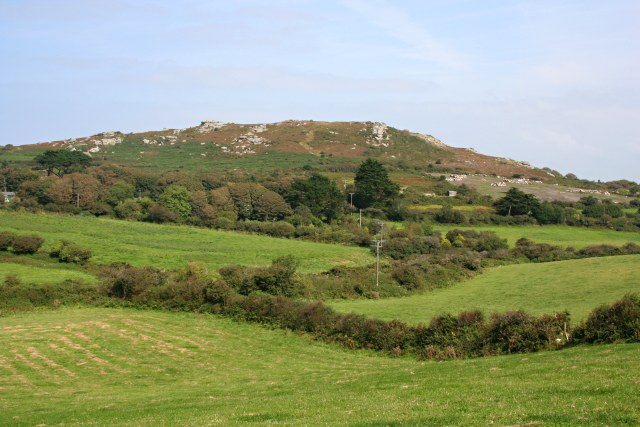

- Location within Cornwall
- Type: Tor enclosure Hill fort
- Periods: Neolithic; Iron Age
- Location: Cornwall

Trencrom Hill, or Trecrobben, (Cornish: Torr Krobm, meaning curved hill) is a prominent hill fort, owned by the National Trust, near Lelant, Cornwall. It is crowned by an univallate Neolithic tor enclosure and was re-used as a hillfort in the Iron Age. Cairns or hut circles can be seen in the level area enclosed by the stone and earth banks. The hill overlooks the Hayle Estuary and river, and Mount's Bay and St Michael's Mount can be seen to the south. The hill was recorded as Torcrobm in 1758 which is derived from Cornish "torr crobm", i.e. 'hunched bulge'.

Trink lies one kilometre to the north west.

== National Trust ==
Trencrom Hill was acquired by the National Trust as freehold on 8 August 1946 from Lieutenant Colonel G L Tyringham. The freehold was 25.568 hectares (63.18 acres). On ascending the hill from the north side there is a plaque in situ in the rock facing the path. It reads:

"This property was presented to the National Trust by Lt Col C L Tyringham, of Trevethoe in March 1946 & at his wish is to be regarded as a memorial to the men and women of Cornwall, who gave their lives in the service of their country during the two world wars. 1914 – 1918, 1939 – 1945"

The well on the west side of the ramparts of the hill fort is known as the Giant's Well. James Halliwell-Phillipps mentioned it in 1861 in Rambles in Western Cornwall, "Outside the vallum at Trecrobben, or, as it is called by the rustics, Trancrom, is the Giant's Well". The well low down on the eastern flank of the hill is not the Giant's Well and is a disused shaft of the Praed Consols (Wheal Cherry/New Trencrom) sett, which was used as a well after the mine had flooded.

== Mining ==
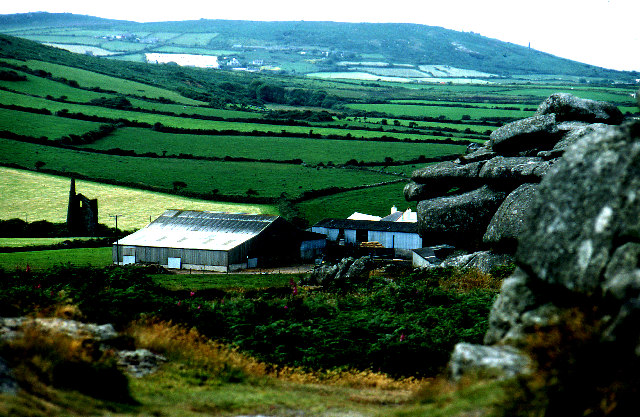
View North-West from the summit

The sett (area) of Wheal Cherry (later known as New Trencrom Mine and Mount Lane Mine) included the summit of Trencrom Hill. Trencrom is within the granite and the sett also covered the metamorphosed killas to the east. Wheal Cherry seems to have been short-lived with £2,293 spent on the erection of a 24-inch pumping engine and 24 inch whim with stamps in 1857/58 and by September 1858 the sett and materials being offered for sale. The sale notice stated that Wheal Cherry was ″a valuable property″. There was another attempt at the start of the 20th century by the Gerry Brothers of Lelant and after five years they sold their interest in 1907. At this time a new shaft was being sunk on the eastern slope and at a depth of 7 fathoms (42 ft; 13 m) found a 2 feet (0.61 m) wide lode which yielded 60 pounds (27 kg) of black tin to the ton. Work was still continuing on Wheal Cherry in 1916. A further attempt in 1943 at the mine, now known as the Mount Lane Mine was unsuccessful.

A survey in January 1996 found small scale quarrying, mostly post-medieval using drills but in some cases using wedges which may be earlier. Large parts of the granite summit have been levelled and a paved track was probably used to transport stone from the quarry face on carts.

== Mythology ==
Trecobben, the giant of Trencrom, was supposed to have killed Cormelian (wife of Cormoran) by throwing a hammer across to St Michael's Mount.
