= Garrow Tor =

Hill and tor on Bodmin Moor, Cornwall, England

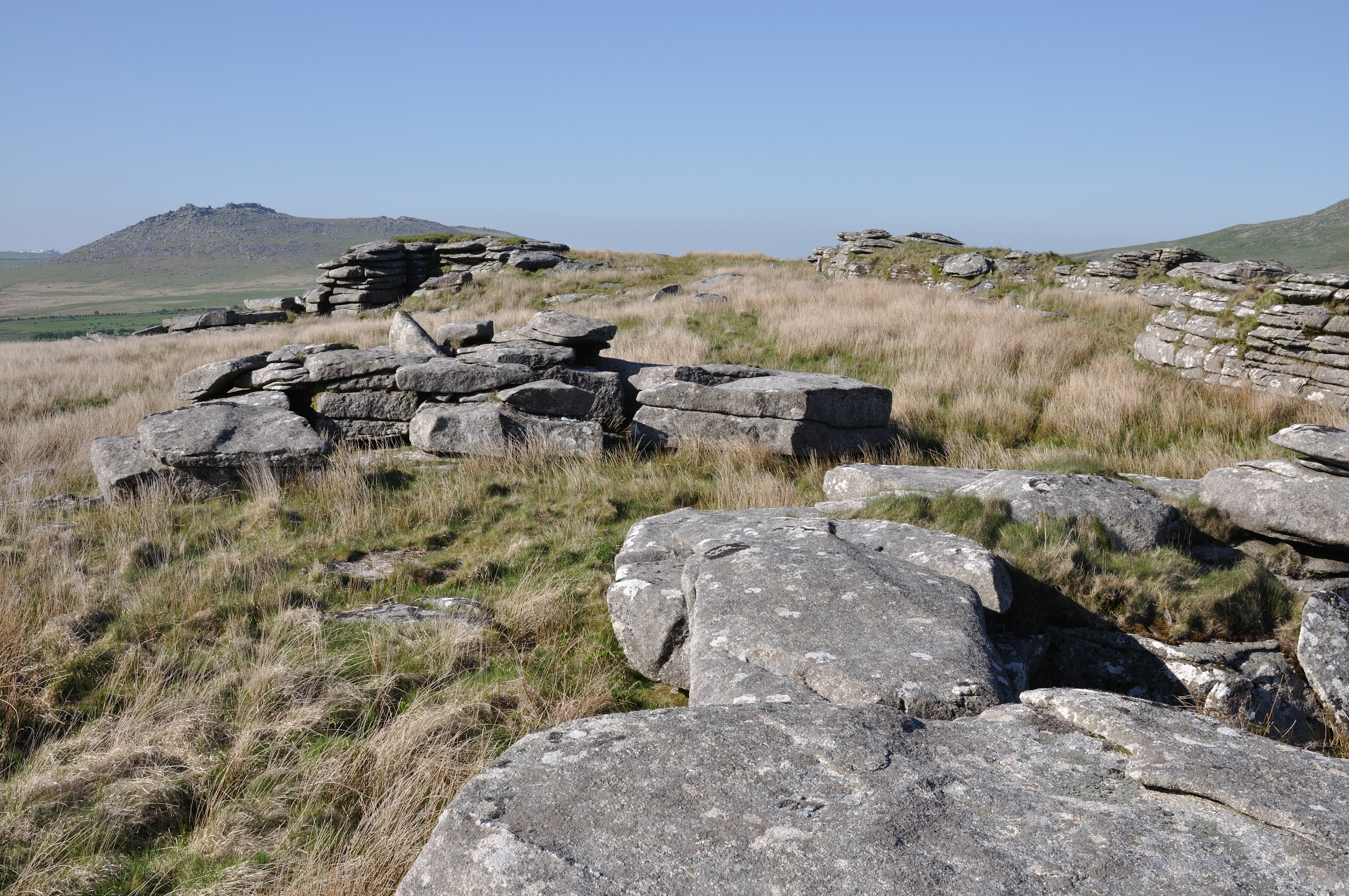
- On Garrow Tor

Highest point
- Elevation: 330 m (1,080 ft)
- Prominence: 57 m (187 ft)
- Listing: TuMP
- Coordinates: 50°34′34.03″N 4°37′12.81″W

Naming
- Native name: Karn Garros (Cornish)

Geography
- Location: Bodmin Moor, Cornwall
- OS grid: SX145780
- Topo map: OS Landranger 200, Explorer 109

Geology
- Mountain type: granite tor

Garrow Tor (Cornish: Karn Garros, meaning tor of rough heath) is a bare, tor-crowned hill, 330 metres (1,080 ft) high, located on Garrow Downs in the northwest of Bodmin Moor in Cornwall, England, UK.

At the summit of Garrow Tor are granite rock outcrops and the hill also bears extensive evidence of early settlement, including a massive stone hedge, Bronze Age settlements and hut circles and Medieval settlements. Panoramic views from the summit include Caradon Hill to the south, Rough Tor and Brown Willy to the north, Butter's Tor to the east, clay country to the west and the Atlantic Ocean to the northwest.

The De Lank River runs past the eastern flank of the tor from north to south, before swinging southwest around the southern foot of the hill. King Arthur's Hall lies a kilometre to the southwest.

When visiting the hill, a useful place to park is by the waterworks to the southwest.
