= King Arthur's Hall =

Megalithic enclosure on Bodmin Moor, Cornwall, England

- Hel Myghtern Arthur (Cornish)
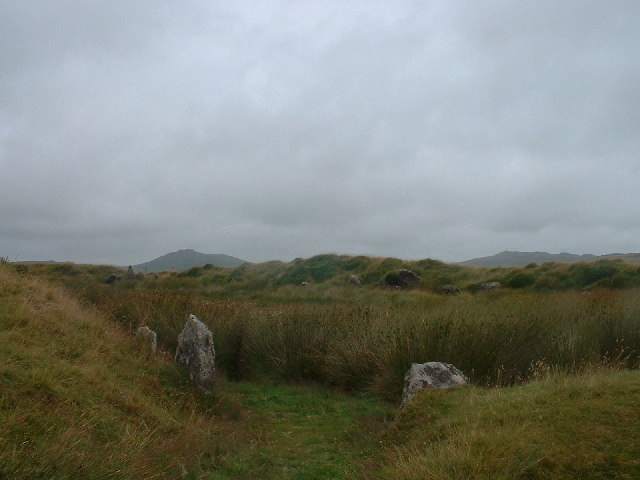

- Location within Cornwall
- 50°34′06″N 4°38′33″W
- Type: Megalithic enclosure
- Periods: Neolithic / Bronze Age
- Location: Bodmin Moor, Cornwall

King Arthur's Hall (Cornish: Hel Myghtern Arthur) is a megalithic enclosure on Bodmin Moor in Cornwall, UK. It is thought to be a late Neolithic or early Bronze Age ceremonial site.

== Description ==
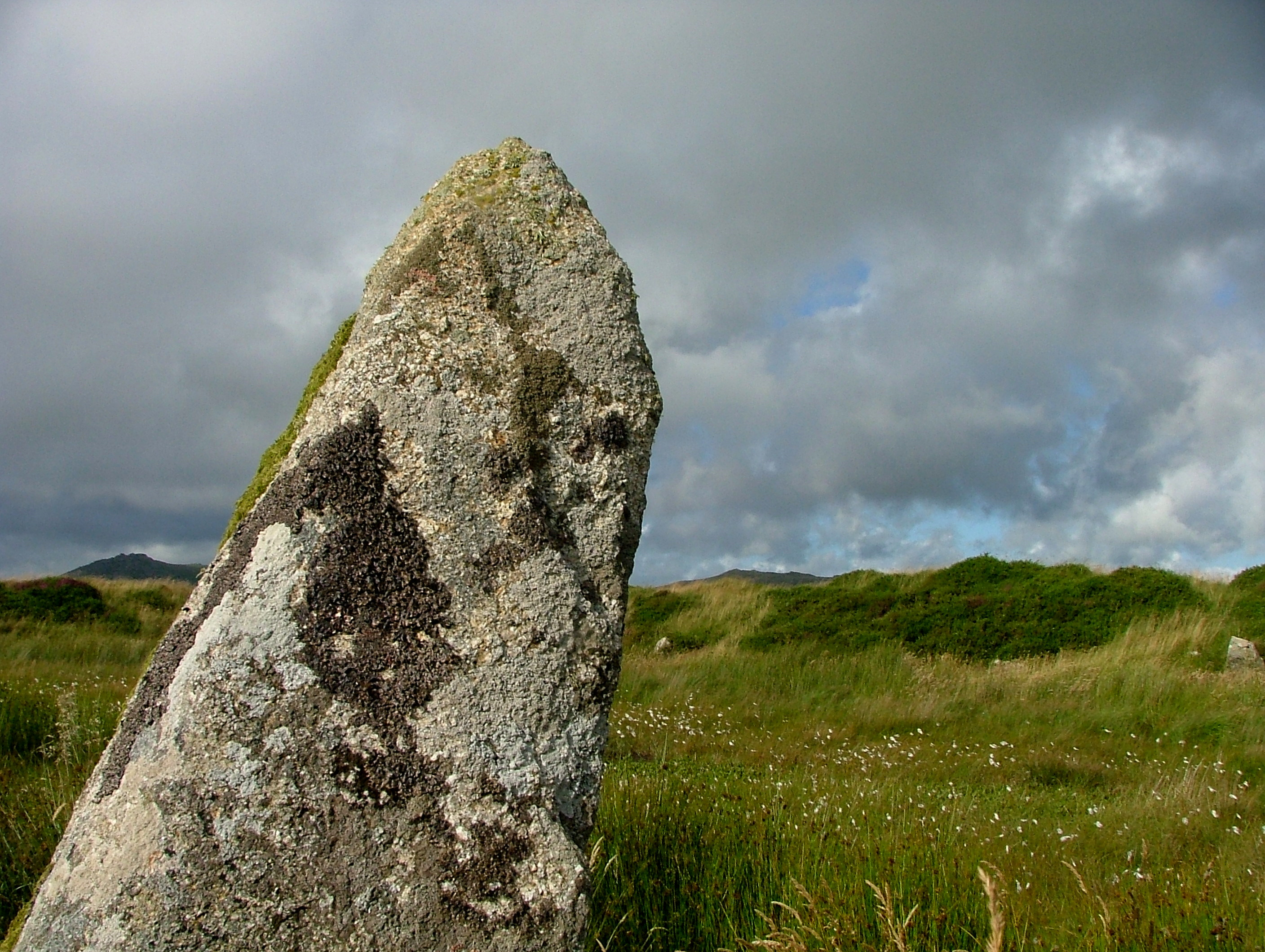
King Arthur's Hall on Bodmin Moor

The monument consists of fifty-six stones arranged in a rectangle with a bank of earth around them and measures approximately 20m by 47m. The interior fills with water and a contemporary ground level has not been established. It has suffered damage by cattle in the past and is now protected by a gated fence. It can be reached by footpaths east of St Breward.

The surrounding area contains many stone circles, hut circles, cairns and cists.

== Origin and use ==
In the absence of any archaeological finds, its origin and use is only speculative. A similar enclosure exists in Brittany which was a Bronze Age cremation site, but a similar rampart construction at Lough Gur in Ireland suggests an earlier Neolithic date. It has even been suggested that it was merely a medieval cattle pound, but the effort required to build the bank and to erect the slabs suggests that it had a more important function.

Some clearance and investigation of King Arthur's Hall was conducted by members of The Heritage Trust in 2013/14. Their work revealed a revetment wall built to retain the inner bank. It was concluded that over time the earth had covered over the top of the revetment wall and that around 140 upright stones now lie buried, recumbent, or standing at an angle. It was suggested that the structure originally formed a tank which filled with water, or was possibly used ritualistically.

In September 2022 Cornwall AONB’s Monumental Improvement project worked with the Cornwall Archaeological Unit to conduct an excavation, to determine when the structure was built. A group of specialists from UK universities have now dated the site to the Neolithic period.

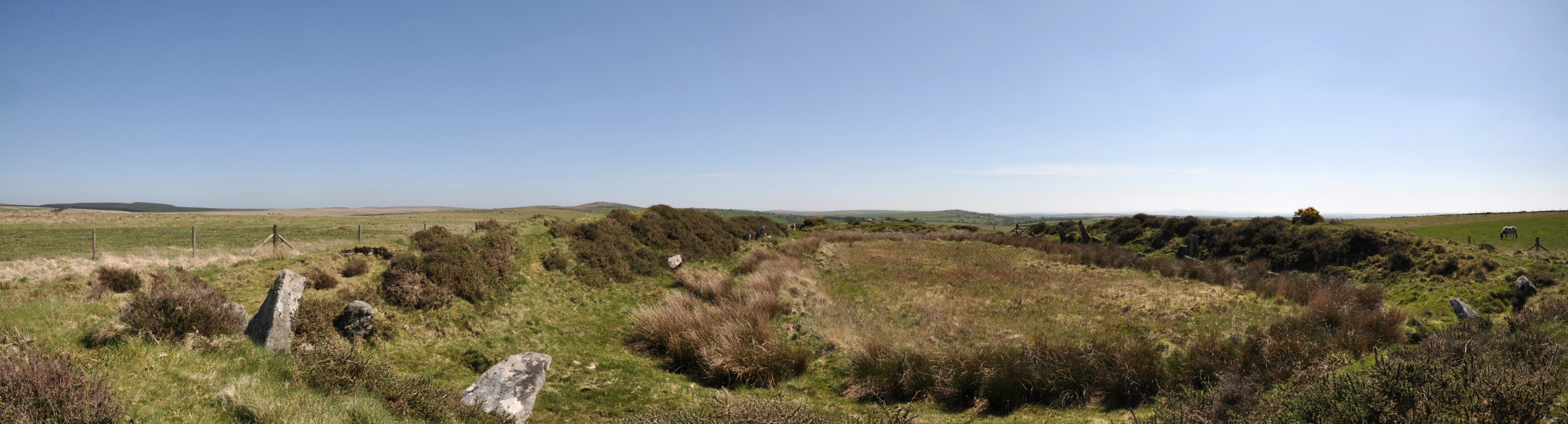
Panoramic view of King Arthur's Hall
