= Rough Tor =

Tor on Bodmin Moor, Cornwall, England

Coordinates: 50°35′47″N 4°37′25″W

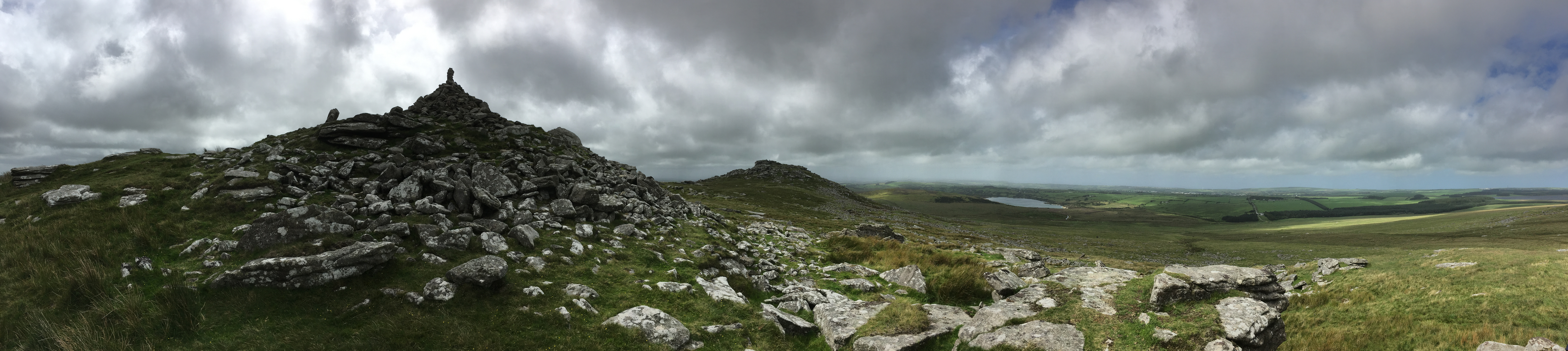
- Little Rough Tor and Rough Tor viewing south west

Highest point
- Elevation: 400 m (1,300 ft)

Naming
- Native name: Torr Garow (Cornish)

Geography
- Location within Cornwall
- Location: Cornwall, UK

Rough Tor (/ˈraʊtər/), or Roughtor (Cornish: Torr Garow), is a tor on Bodmin Moor, Cornwall, England, United Kingdom. The site comprises the tor summit and logan stone, a Neolithic tor enclosure, many Bronze Age hut circles, and some contemporary monuments.

== Toponymy ==
In the 19th century, the hill was known as Router, and even into the late 20th century, some locals used this pronunciation.

== Geography ==
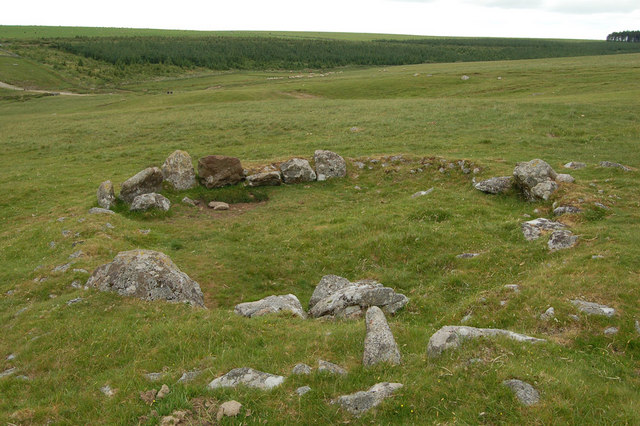
Iron Age remains, Rough Tor.

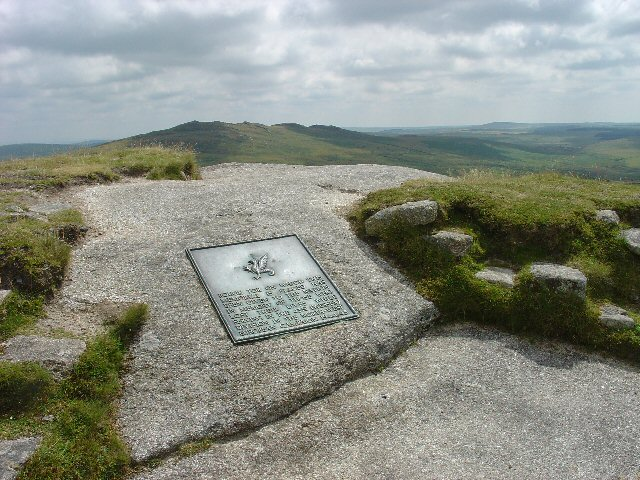
43rd Wessex Division Memorial

Rough Tor is approximately one mile northwest of Brown Willy, Cornwall's highest point, on Bodmin Moor. Its summit is 1313 ft (400m) above mean sea level, making it the second highest point in Cornwall. Both hills are in the civil parish of St Breward and near Camelford. The De Lank River rises nearby and flows between the two hills. Rough Tor and Little Rough Tor are twin summits of a prominent ridge of granite, though there are actually three tors at the site: Showery Tor (Also known as Flat Cap Ned), Little Rough Tor, and Rough Tor. Crowdy Reservoir and the Lowermoor Water Treatment Works are not far away from the hill.

Hikes to the summit and neighbouring Brown Willy are popular, though the walk may be strenuous; a road provides easy access to a car park, which is about a mile and a half from the summit.

=== Neolithic ===
The summit of Rough Tor once had a Neolithic tor enclosure. The summit is encircled by rough stone walls that align with natural stone outcroppings on the tor. The walls would have originally completely encircled the tor and would have had numerous stone lined openings. In the circle's interior, there are remains of terraces levelled into the slopes, which archaeologists believe formed the foundations of circular wooden houses. There are also cleared areas near the terraces that have been garden plots.

=== Bronze Age ===
The Rough Tor enclosure is located in an area containing numerous upstanding monuments and other Bronze Age sites, such as Fernacre stone circle, which is only 200 metres from the site. Stannon stone circle is also located nearby, and there are numerous cairns and burial monuments in the vicinity.

On the southern slopes of Rough Tor, there are the remains of numerous stone hut circles, set around three or four enclosures that may have held stock. There are also the remains of a large field system, partially overlain with a medieval field system. The purpose of this field system has been debated, with historians disagreeing whether the fields were used for cereals or stock.

=== Medieval ===
The summit of the tor was once the site of a medieval chapel which was built into the side of one of the cairns, and was dedicated to St. Michael. The chapel was recorded in the 14th century, and is the only known hilltop chapel on Bodmin Moor. As it overlooks an ancient trackway across the moor, it may have served as a guide for travellers. There are remains of a second medieval building at the bottom of the summit and a beacon may have been maintained here or at the summit by a hermit.

A medieval field system based on straight lines overlays the Bronze Age field system at Rough Tor, and several medieval artifacts have been found in the area, such as the base for a stone cross and a small stone cross.

=== Contemporary ===
A memorial stands below Rough Tor, commemorating the men of the 43rd (Wessex) Division who lost their lives in the Second World War. The Memorial reads:

ROUGH TOR ON WHICH THIS
MEMORIAL IS PLACED HAS
BEEN GIVEN TO THE NATION
IN MEMORY OF THOSE WHO
LOST THEIR LIVES WHILE
SERVING IN THE 43RD (WESSEX)
DIVISION IN THE NORTH-WEST
EUROPEAN CAMPAIGN 1944/5

There is also a memorial to Charlotte Dymond, who was murdered on the Tor in 1844.

In a programme shown in 2007 Channel 4's Time Team investigated a 500-metre cairn and the site of a Bronze Age village on the slopes of Rough Tor.

There is also a Rough Tor on Dartmoor in Devon, three miles west of Postbridge.

The early colonial name for Mount Barrow, in Northern Tasmania, was 'Row Tor, - believed to be the homonym of 'Rough Tor': named by Matthew Flinders on his maritime survey.

== Popular culture ==
Rough Tor features in Daphne du Maurier's novel Jamaica Inn.

Rough Tor and Brown Willy are listed in a Ward Lock travel guide from the 1920s as places to visit, saying that 'The scenery is wildly grand, rugged and bleak' and recommending hiring a vehicle from Camelford for the visit.

== Cornish wrestling ==
Cornish wrestling tournaments, for prizes, were held on Rough Tor in the 1800s, often as part of larger festivals.
