= St Breward =

Civil parish and village in Cornwall, England

Coordinates: 50.559°N 4.690°W

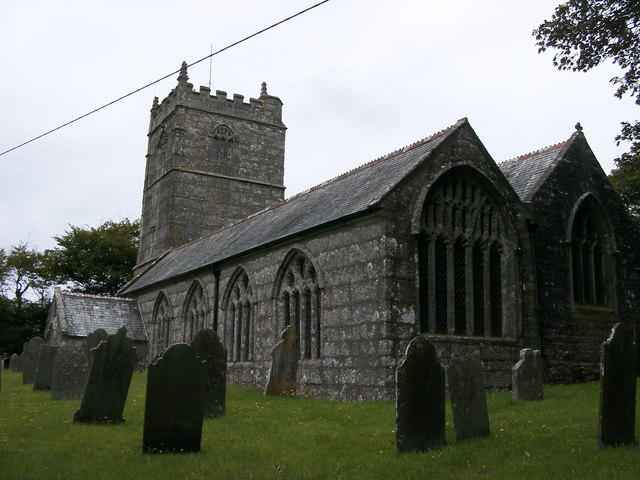
St Breward Church

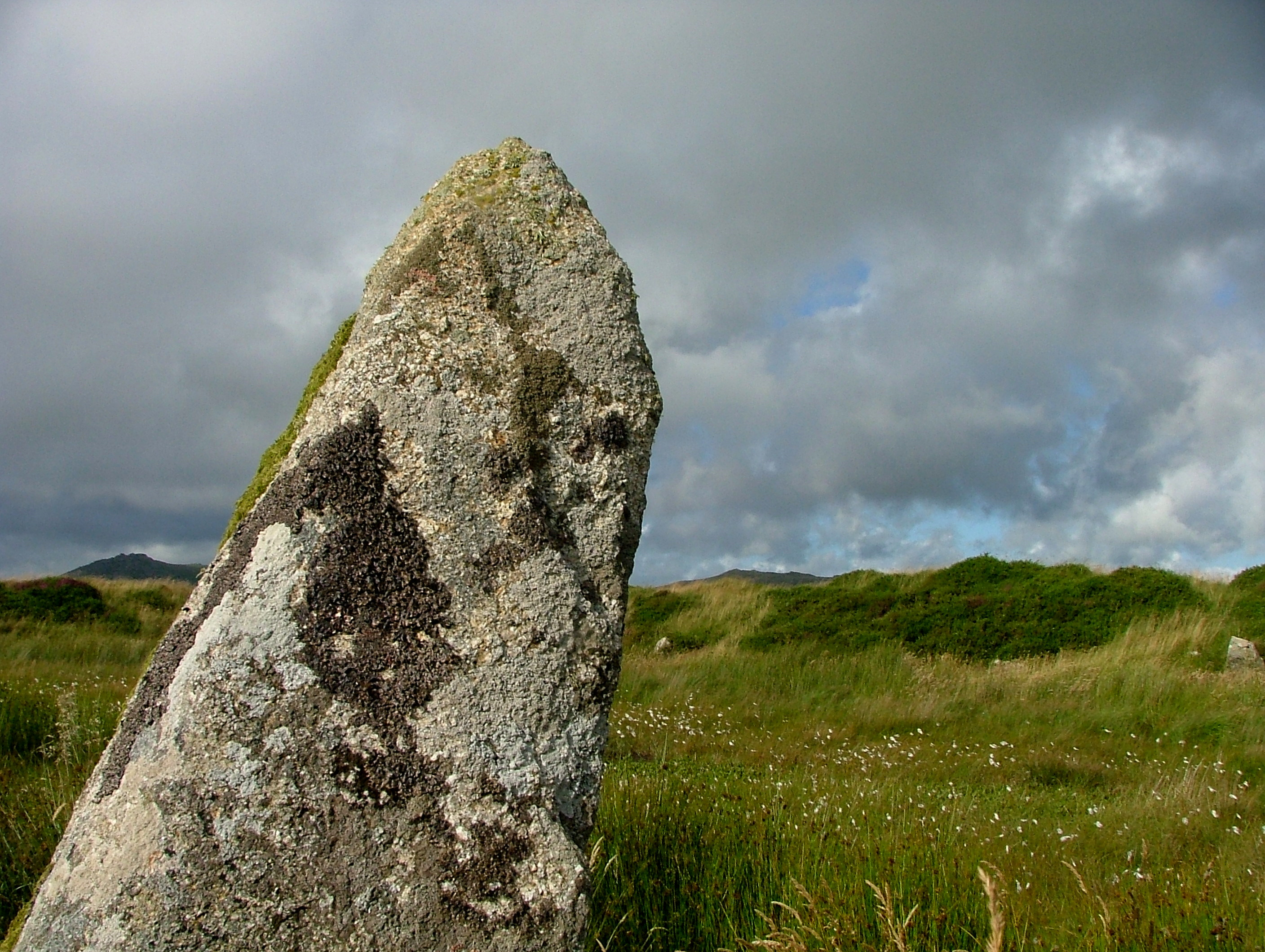
King Arthur's Hall, Bodmin Moor

St Breward (Cornish: S. Bruwerd) is a civil parish and village in Cornwall, England, United Kingdom. It is on the western side of Bodmin Moor, about 6 miles (10 km) north of Bodmin. At the 2011 census the parish population including Cooksland and Fentonadle was 919.

The parish name derives from Saint Branwalader. Until the 19th century it was commonly known by the corrupt form of the name: 'Simonward'.

== Local amenities ==
The village has a footpath which travels in a loop past the holy well and the church. There is a shop & post office, a village hall, a football club (Brake Parc FC), a playground, a Methodist chapel, an Anglican church, a pub (The Old Inn) a war memorial hall and a primary school.

=== Parish church ===
St Branwalader's Church, St Breward
- St Branwalader's Church, St Breward
- Denomination: Church of England
- Churchmanship: Broad Church

History
- Dedication: St Branwalader

Administration
- Province: Canterbury
- Diocese: Truro
- Archdeaconry: Bodmin
- Parish: St Breward

The church is situated at the northern end of the village and is dedicated to St Branwalader (or Brueredus). It is a substantial building of the Norman period to which a south aisle and western tower were added in the 15th century (these additions are of granite). It was restored in the 19th century, and only parts of the Norman north arcade remain. There were in the medieval period three chapels in the parish: at Hamatethy the manorial chapel of the Peverells, St Michael's Chapel, Roughtor, and another at Chaple. Thomas Taylor the historian was vicar here and edited the parish registers. St Breward feast is observed on the Sunday next after February 2.

=== Institute and War Memorial Hall ===
Situated at Limehead, the Hall is fully accessible for disabled users and is equipped with Superfast Broadband, and a Smartboard with PA & Hearing Loop Systems. The Hall is used for social, education and craft activities and is also the home of the St Breward Archives, managed by the History Group. The small kitchen is well equipped for preparing and serving light refreshments.

=== Hamatethy Manor ===
Hamatethy Manor house and estate lies about half a mile north of St Breward. The Manor of Hamatethy dates back to before the Norman Conquest. After 1066 it was held by Count Robert of Mortain, half-brother of William the Conqueror. From the 12th to the 15th century the Manor was held by the Peverell family, then passed to the Hungerford family and later the Mitchell and Onslow families. The present manor house was built in the early 1800s and extended in 1924 when it incorporated some features from the demolished house at Trewinnow, Davidstow, including a doorway date 1678.

== History and antiquities ==
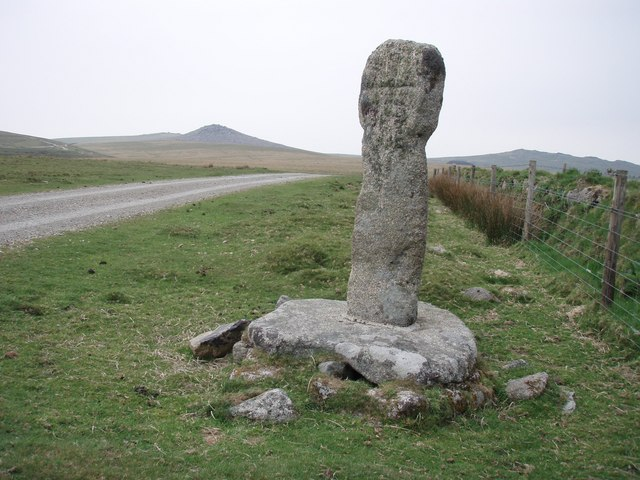
Middle Moor cross

The moorland area of the parish is notable for prehistoric remains, including the earthwork known as King Arthur's Hall. For many centuries St Breward's main industry was the mining of granite which has been used in Cornwall and exported to many other places. The most important quarry is De Lank which produces granite of very high quality. More recently china clay has also been quarried there. There is another important china clay works at Stannon.

The most important prehistoric remains are the earthwork already mentioned, the Fernacre stone circle and two other stone circles (one 2.5 miles north-east and the other near Leaze Farm). The first of these has 76 stones in the circle and a single outlying stone; the latter has 16 stones but probably had 22 originally. Arthur Langdon (1896) records seven crosses and six cross-bases in the parish: two of the crosses are at Lanke; other crosses are at Penvorder, Deaconstow and Middlemoor. In 1998, 1999 and 2000 three seasons of archaeological recording work were undertaken at the china clay works on Stannon Down to learn more about the numerous Bronze Age remains to be found there.

== Geography ==
In the 17th century St. Breward was two separate villages, Churchtown (higher) and St. Breward (lower). More houses were built and slowly the villages merged into one. There are several main parts to the village: Churchtown, Rylands, Row, Limehead, Wenford, Penvorder, Higher Penquite and Lower Penquite.

The bridge and hamlet of Wenfordbridge and Tuckingmill lies on the River Camel at the boundary of St Breward parish with the neighbouring parish of St Tudy. The parish includes a moorland area which contains Rough Tor and Brown Willy, which is the highest point in Cornwall.

== Cornish wrestling ==
Cornish wrestling tournaments, for prizes, have been held at St Breward for centuries. Venues included the Football Field.

See also wrestling in Wenfordbridge.

== Notable people ==
- George Martin (1864–1946) was a priest in the Church of England who gave up his living and went to Southwark, where he became known among the poor as the modern St Anthony. He was born at St Breward.
- Trevor Colman (1941–2022), former UKIP MEP was born and raised in St Breward.
- Brian Hanscomb (born 1944), an artist engraver, lives in the village.
