= Nanjizal =

Bay in Cornwall, UK

Coordinates: 50.054°N 5.693°W

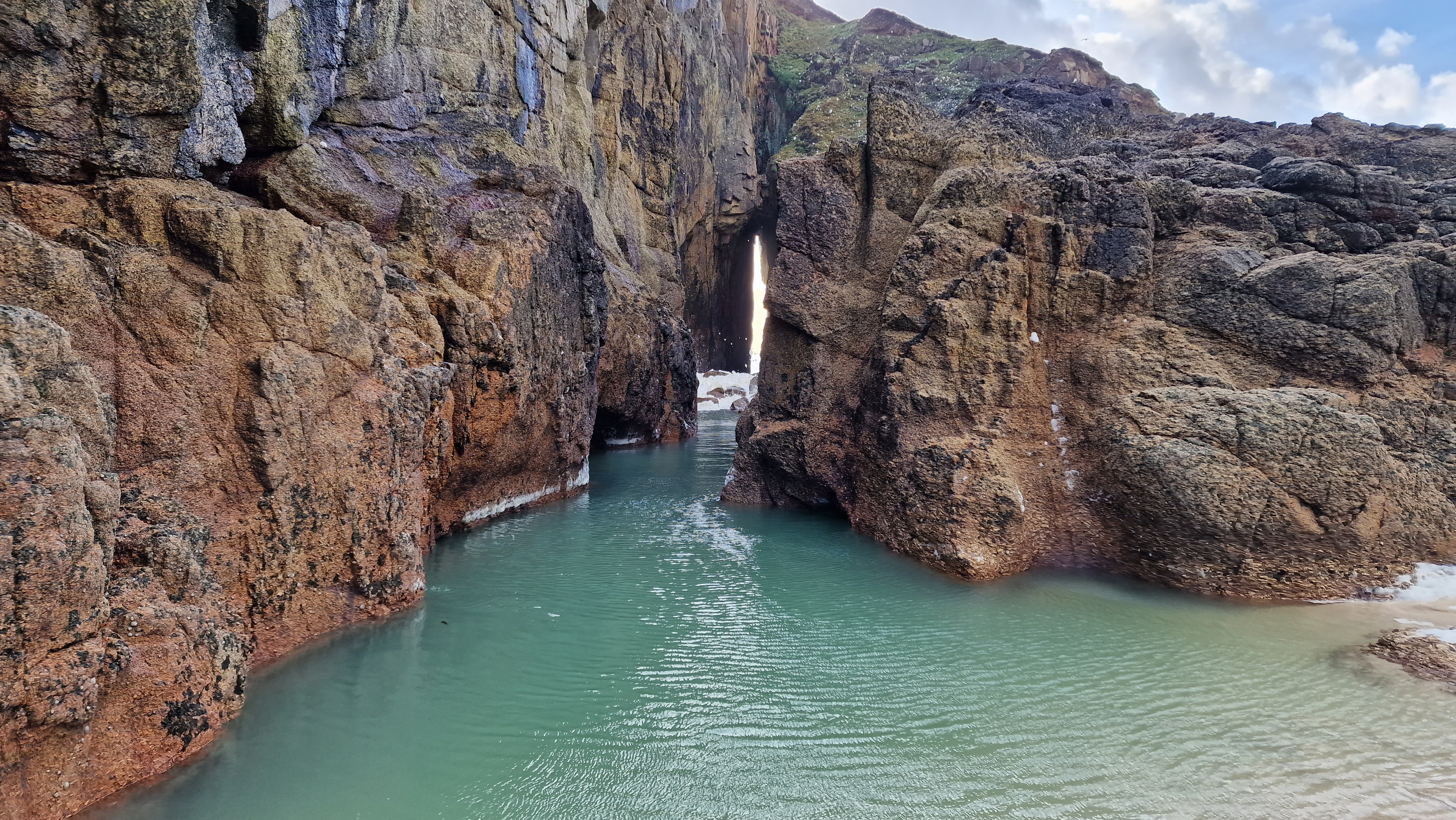
The entrance to the cave is a famous swimming spot

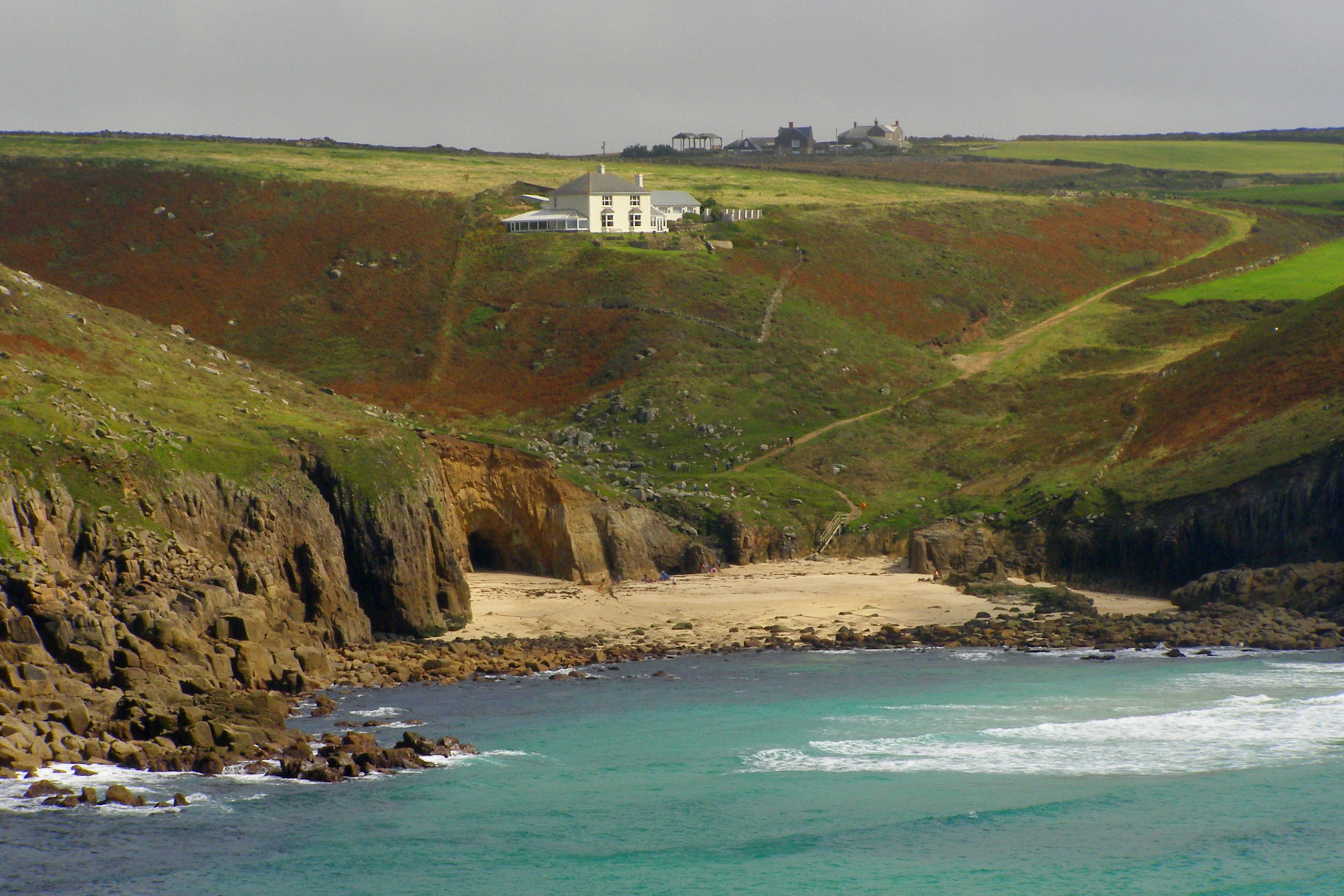
Nanjizal

Nanjizal (/nænˈdʒɪzl/; Cornish: Porth Nansusel, meaning "cove of the howling valley"), (Note: Although the Akademi Kernewek translate Nanjizal Cove to Porth Nansisel, ("cove of the low valley"), Craig Weatherhill ruled out the translation of 'low valley' in 2017, based on a spelling from 1302. He instead suggested the translation Porth Nansusel, which uses a particle from the Cornish usa ("to howl") rather than isel ("low"), due to the valley's orientation in the direction of the prevailing wind.) also known as Mill Bay, is a beach and cove in the civil parish of St Levan, Cornwall, on the south-western coast of Great Britain. Situated one mile to the south-east of Land's End, Nanjizal has no direct access via road, and is usually reached via the South West Coast Path from Land's End in the north, or from Porthgwarra to the south. Nanjizal is also a noted bird watching location.

== Geography ==
Nanjizal is a cove and valley facing west into the Atlantic Ocean. It is bounded on the north side by the headland of Carn Boel and Trevilley Cliff and to the south is the headland of Carn Lês Boel and Higher Bosistow Cliff. Depending on tides and storms the beach can vary from sand to boulders. On the south is Zawn Pyg (pointed chasm) also known as 'Song of the Sea', an arch where the sea has worn through a tall narrow passageway. The large pools near the zawn are called Big and Little Muzzan (Morzawn, zawn of the sea) and the current that leads from the zawn to the Longships is called Froze Muzzan (current of the sea zawn). Inside the cove are large rock-pools with many types of sea anemones and seaweeds. To the north is a distinctive rock close to the cliff known as the 'Diamond Horse'. There are also a number of other caves further round the beach.

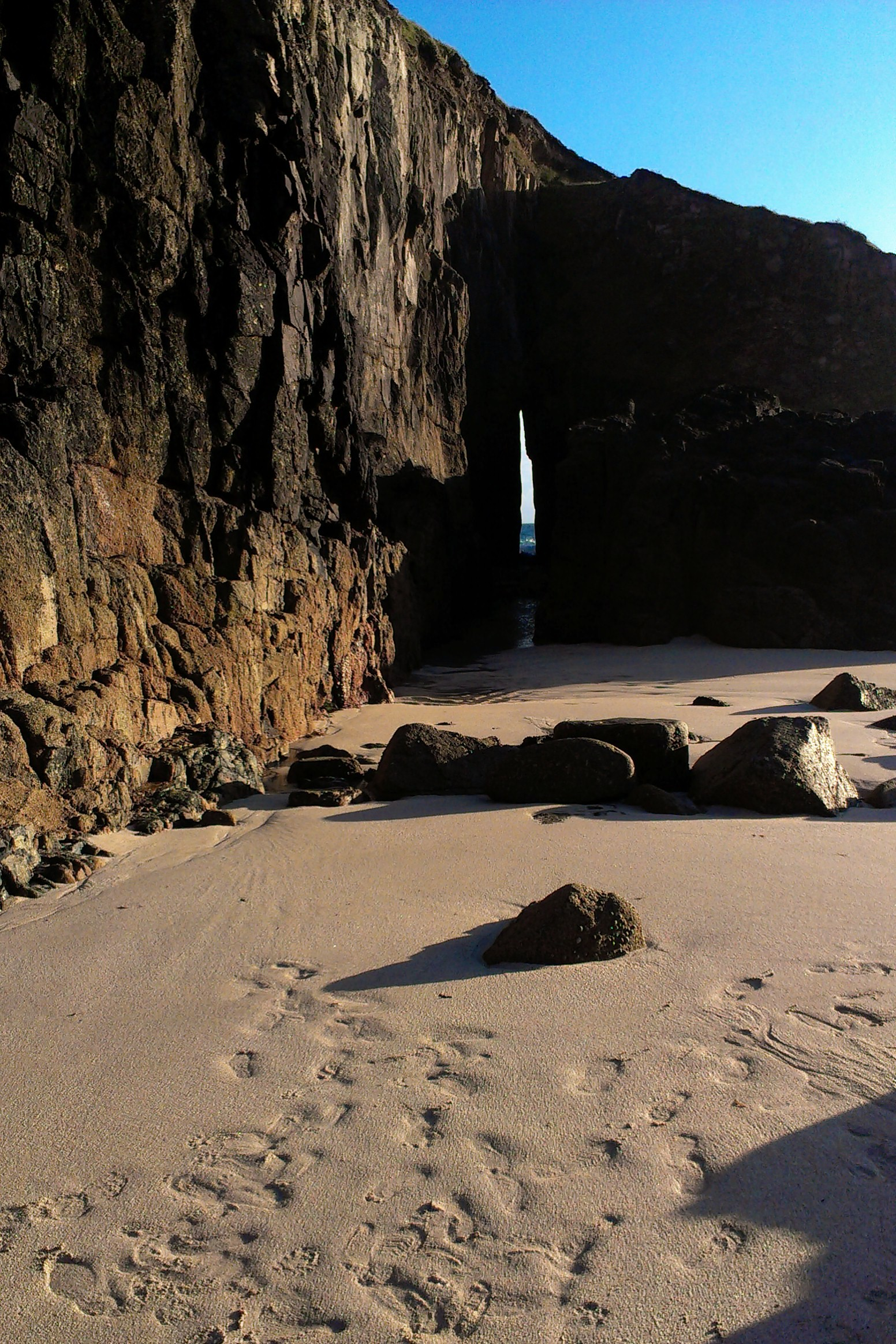
The Zawn Pyg ('Song of the Sea') rock arch

== History ==
The City of Cardiff was a collier in water ballast heading for her home port of Cardiff. She left Le Havre on 6 March 1912 and rounded the Lizard at midnight on 20 March in a freshening southerly gale. By dawn she was trying to round Land's End but was beaten back as far as Porthcurno. She passed close to Tol-pedn at 0900 and there were fears for her safety as the gale increased and veered WSW. By 1100, unable to make headway she anchored a mile south of Land's End and less than half a mile from Carn Lés Boel, the southern flank of Nanjizal. Her engines were kept on full ahead but she was slowly drifting towards the shore and with a sudden squall she struck rocks 150 yards (140 m) out. She was brought ashore on a flooding tide. The crew, two wives and a two-year-old were carried to land on the rocket apparatus by the Sennen Life-saving Apparatus Team who had followed the ship along the shore. The skeleton can be seen at low tide.

== Wildlife and ecology ==
Nanjizel is within the Porthgwarra to Pordenack Point Site of Special Scientific Interest (SSSI), designated in 1977 for its granite cliffs and maritime heath. The valley is a constant effort site (CES) for the West Cornwall Ringing Group which monitors the birds in the valley. Breeding birds include common chiffchaff (Phylloscopus collybita), common whitethroat (Sylvia communis), dunnock (Prunella modularis), Eurasian blackcap (Sylvia atricapilla), Eurasian wren (Troglodytes troglodytes) and sedge warbler (Acrocephalus schoenobaenus). Other birds found include brambling (Fringilla montifringilla), cirl bunting (Emberiza cirlus), common grasshopper warbler (Locustella naevia), Eurasian siskin (Spinus spinus), lesser redpoll (Acanthis cabaret) and subalpine warbler (Sylvia cantillans). Rareties ringed in the autumn of 2014 were aquatic warbler (Acrocephalus paludicola), barred warbler (Sylvia nisoria) and paddyfield warbler (Acrocephalus agricola). A first for Britain occurred on 8 October 2008 with the trapping, and the measuring of biometric data, of an alder flycatcher (Empidonax alnorum). A first for Cornwall occurred on 2 September 2015, when a Blyth's reed warbler (Acrocephalus dumetorum) was ringed. There have been six Isles of Scilly records and one from Devon so it was considered long overdue for Cornwall.

== In popular culture ==
The four-part Doctor Who serial "The Smugglers" was filmed here on 19 June 1966; in which "The TARDIS" materialises on a beach.

== Gallery ==
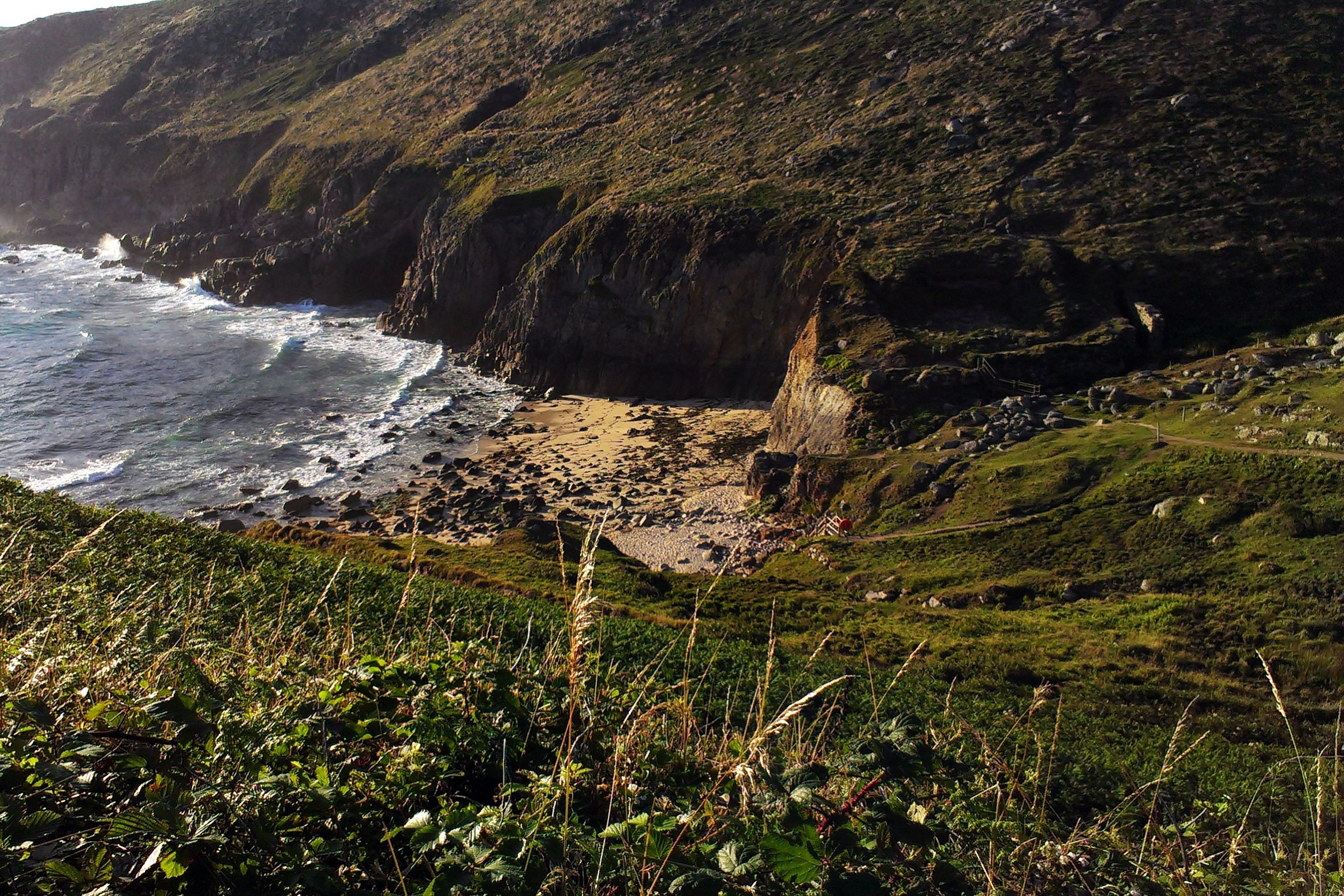
View north across Nanjizal cove from Higher Bosistow Cliff

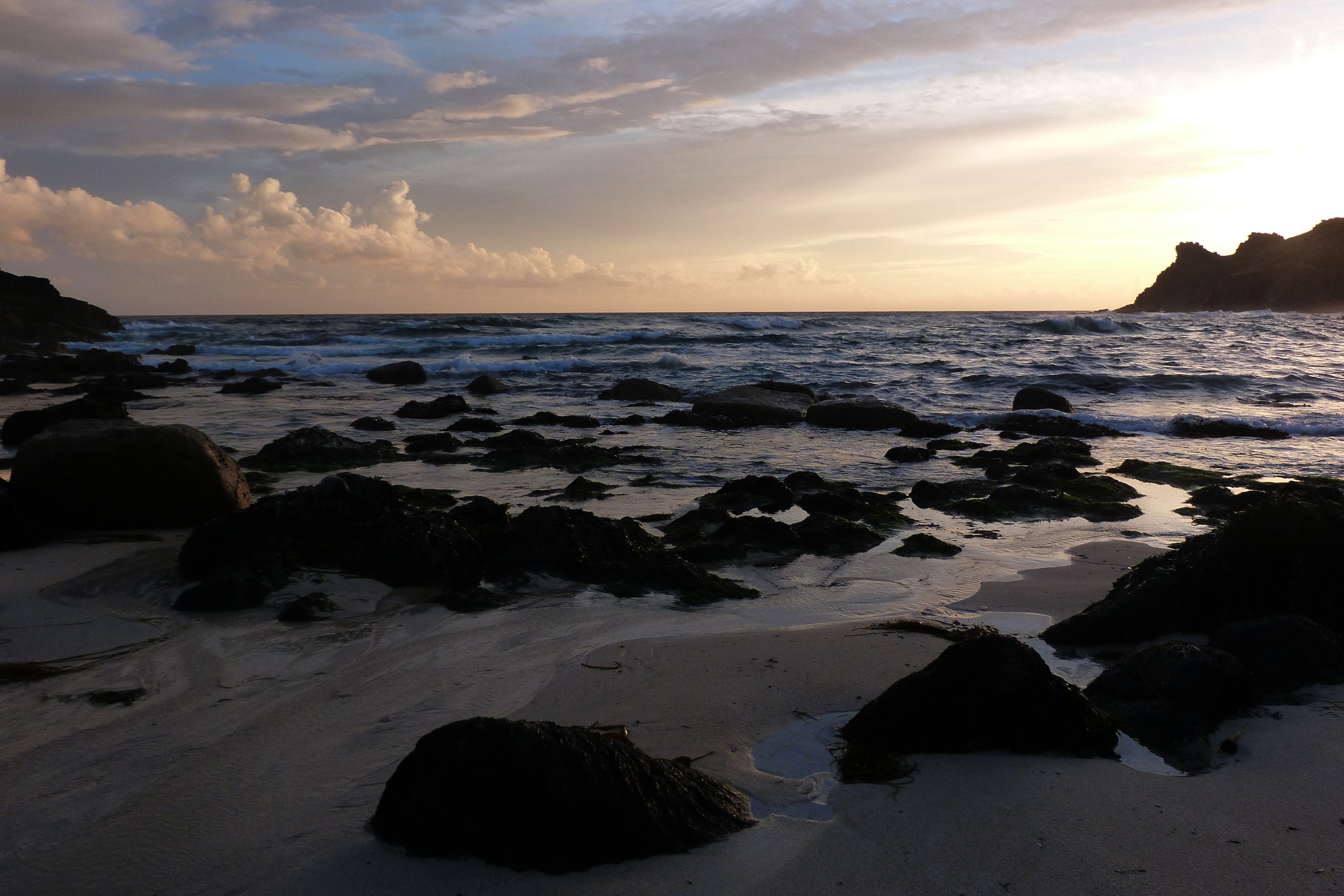
Nanjizal beach at sunset, looking out to sea

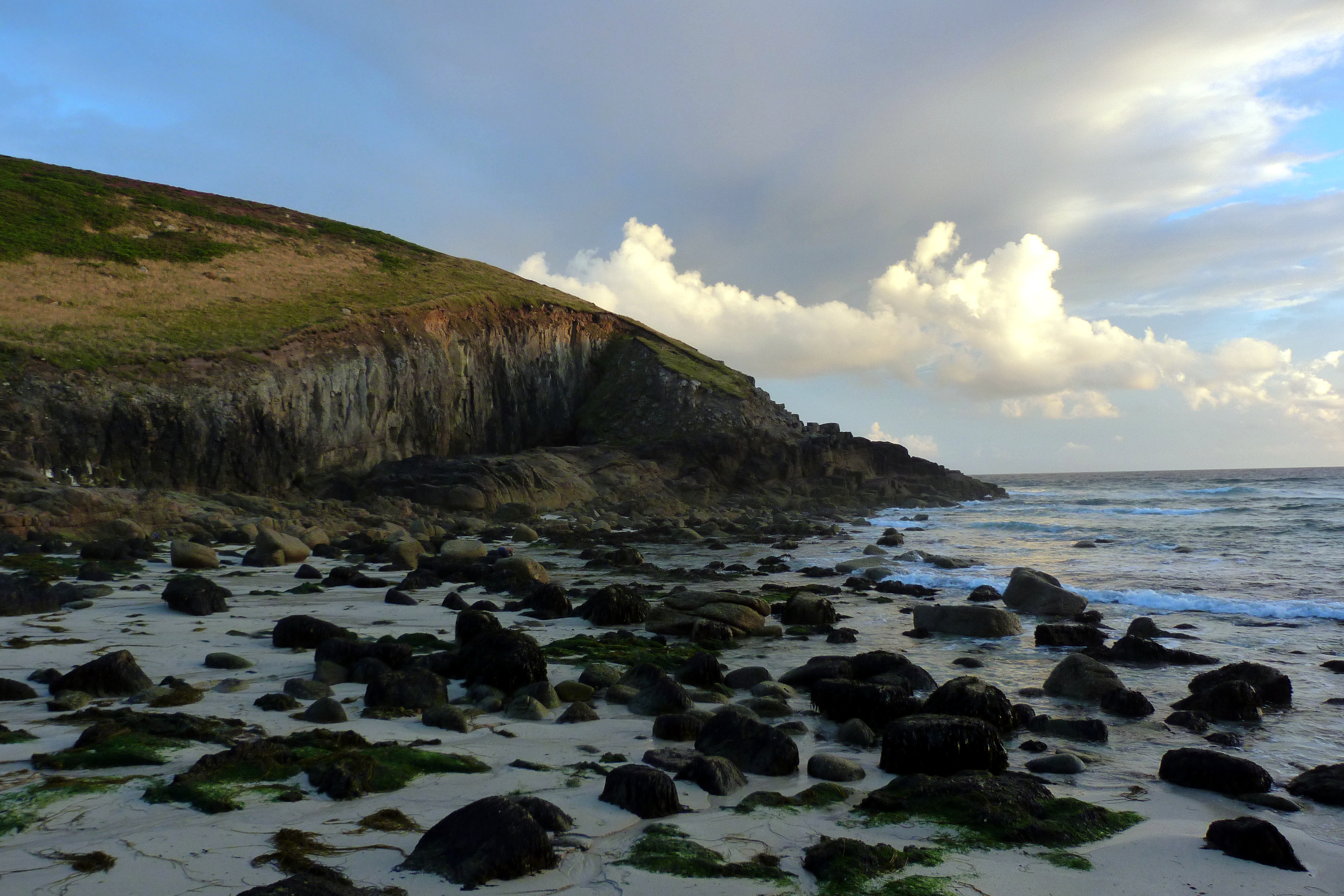
Nanjizal beach at sunset, looking south

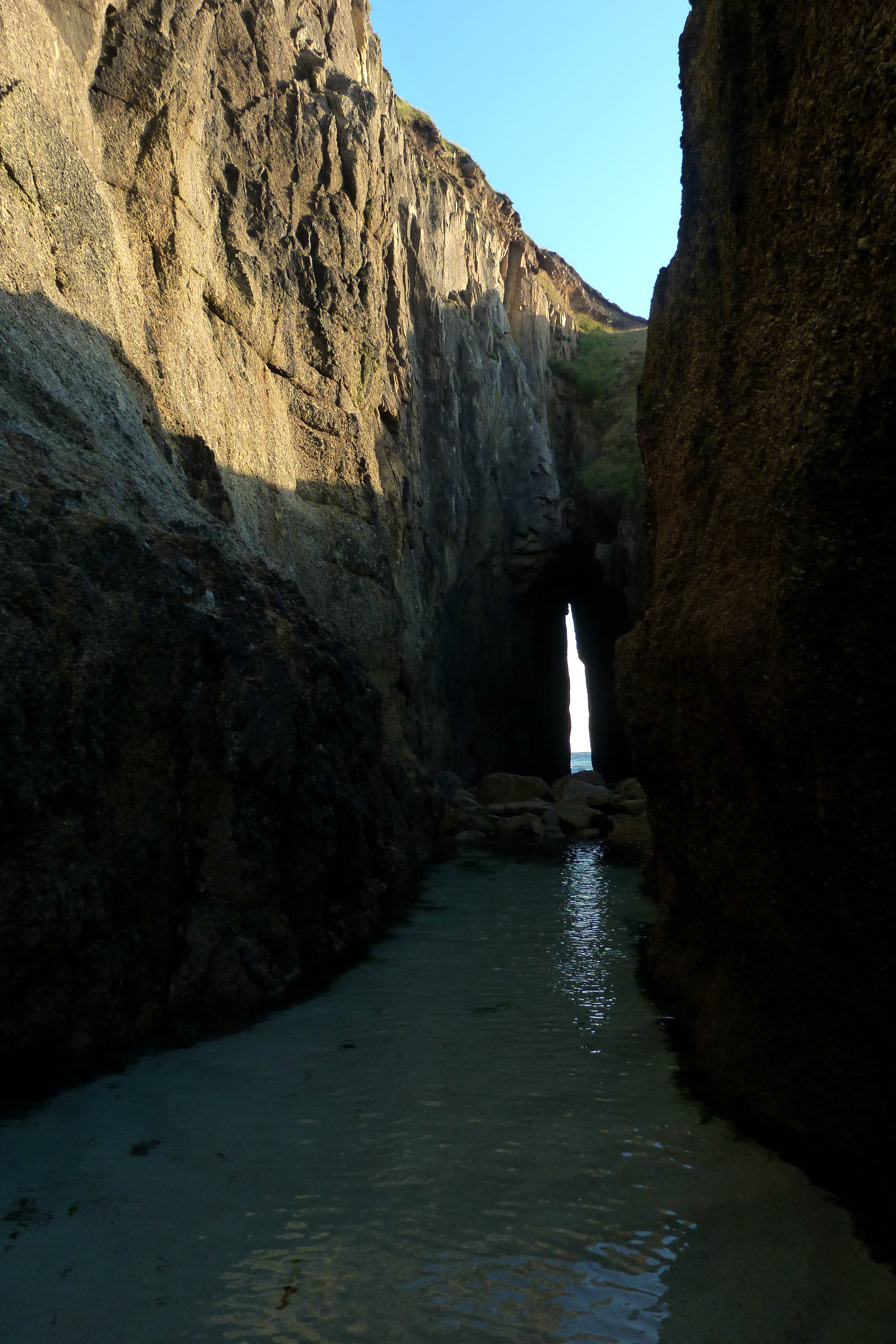
View through the Zawn Pyg rock arch

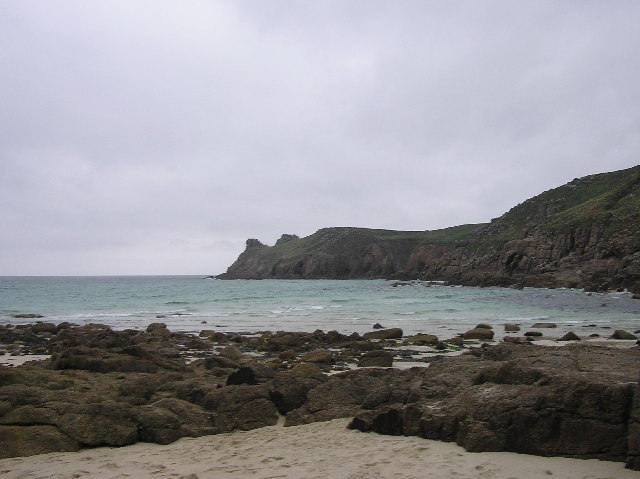
Mill Bay, or Nanjizal, June 2005
