= Gwennap Head =

Headland in Cornwall, England

Coordinates: 50.0365°N 5.6804°W

Gwennap Head: Cornish: Pedn Pennwydh
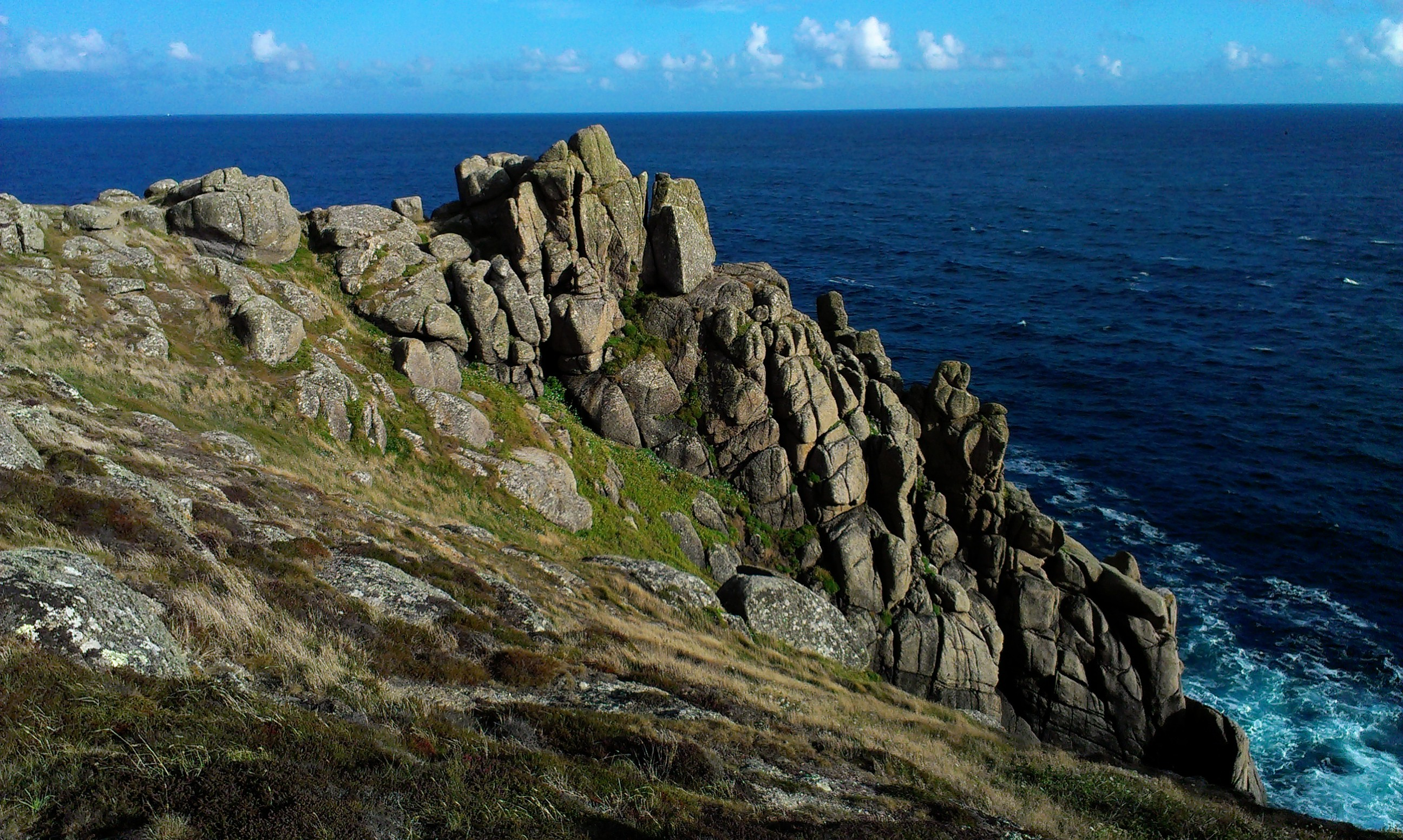
- Granite cliffs at Gwennap Head (Tol-Pedn-Penwith) near Porthgwarra

- Location within Cornwall
- OS grid reference: SW365217
- Unitary authority: Cornwall
- Ceremonial county: Cornwall
- Region: South West
- Country: England
- Sovereign state: United Kingdom
- Postcode district: TR19
- Police: Devon and Cornwall
- Fire: Cornwall
- Ambulance: South Western

Gwennap Head (Cornish: Pedn Pennwydh, meaning head of Penwith; grid reference SW3621) is a headland on the south coast of the Penwith peninsula, Cornwall, United Kingdom. It is within the parish of St Levan and approximately 4 miles (6.4 km) south of Land's End, and less than 1 mile (1.6 km) north-west of Porthgwarra, the nearest village. The area of Gwennap Head is designated as part of the Penwith Heritage Coast and also designated as part of the Cornwall Area of Outstanding Natural Beauty. The South West Coast Path closely follows the coastline around the headland.

Its intricate and varied granite cliffs include the famous Chair Ladder crag, making it a popular destination for recreational climbers of all abilities. The older and more correct name for the headland is Tol-Pedn-Penwith (locally "Tol-Pedn" for short) which comes from the Cornish for 'the holed headland of Penwith', referring to the awesome vertical blowhole from the clifftop to a sea cave. From 1888 the name was changed to Gwennap Head, perhaps named after a local family, but the new name did not enter local usage until the 1970s.

The inshore waters around the headland are busy with shipping of all sizes. There is a Coastwatch station on the headland in the former coastguard building. The area is also popular with naturalists who, at the appropriate time of the year, can see rare animals such as chough (Pyrrhocorax pyrrhocorax), great shearwater (Puffinus gravis), basking shark and ocean sunfish (Mola mola).

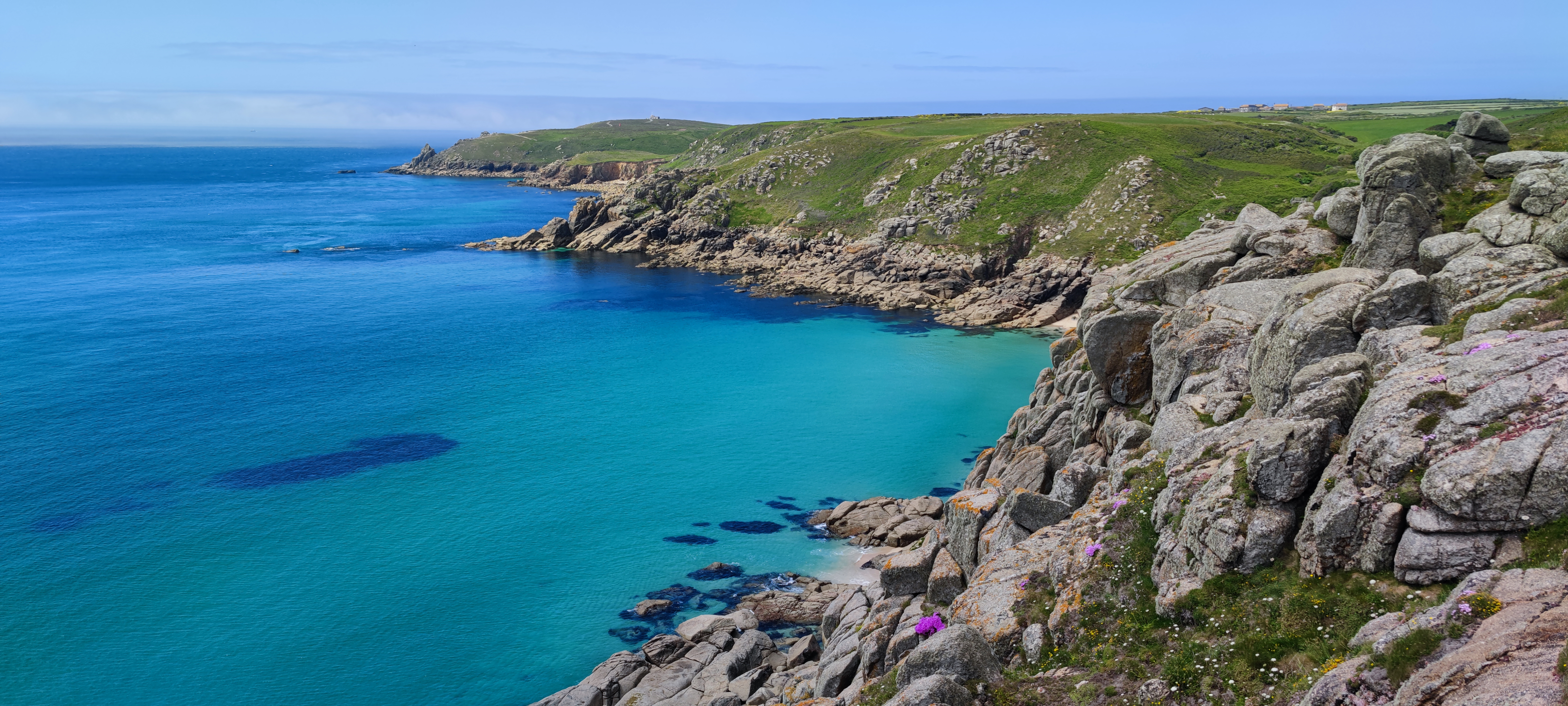
Gwennap Head overlooking Porthchapel Beach

== History ==
Tol Pedn was once known as Land's End, and in the early 19th century was usually called St Leven's Land's End in order to distinguish it from the present day Land's End, which was then called Sennen Land's End and Cape Cornwall which has also been known as Land's End.

It would seem that, in the past Tol-pedn was considered to be a larger area, than what is today considered to be the headland of Gwennap Head. Hitchens (1824) writes that ″Tolpedn-Penwith is divided from the mainland by an ancient stone wall″, which he thought might have been for defence. A stone wall exists to this day to the north reaching the sea near Black Carn although it seems to be a boundary and/or stock wall rather than defensive. He also indicates that there was other evidence for ancient fortifications in the area. In the 1840s H McLauchlan reported seeing ″faint traces of a Bronze Age tumulus at the top″ of Tol-pedn-Penwith, although today there are no traces, and the highest point is now occupied by the NCI Coastwatch station. Reports of a cliff castle are considered doubtful, partly because there are no traces but also because the site is considered unsuitable.

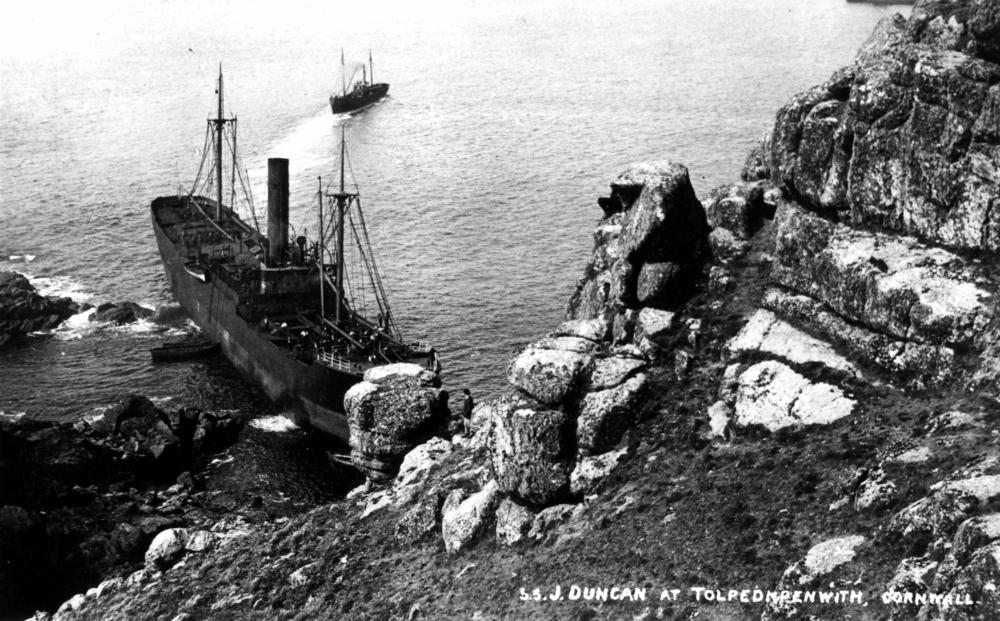
The cargo steamship J Duncan wrecked on Gwennap Head in 1913

On the north side of Gwennap Head is a stream that flows into the boulder-strewn cove of Porth Loe. On 14 March 1905 the Kyber was seen from the Wolf Rock, on a bearing to pass The Lizard. The next morning the barque was seen coming ashore at Porth Loe and broke up within fifteen minutes. Men building the nearby coastguard houses used ladders to save three of the crew and a further twenty-three are buried in a mass grave in St Levan churchyard.

Roskestral Farm was put up for auction in May 1887 and included Tol Pedn Penwith, the Funnel Hole and portions of Carn Glaze Common. The St Aubyn Estate owns the area.

=== NCI Coastwatch ===
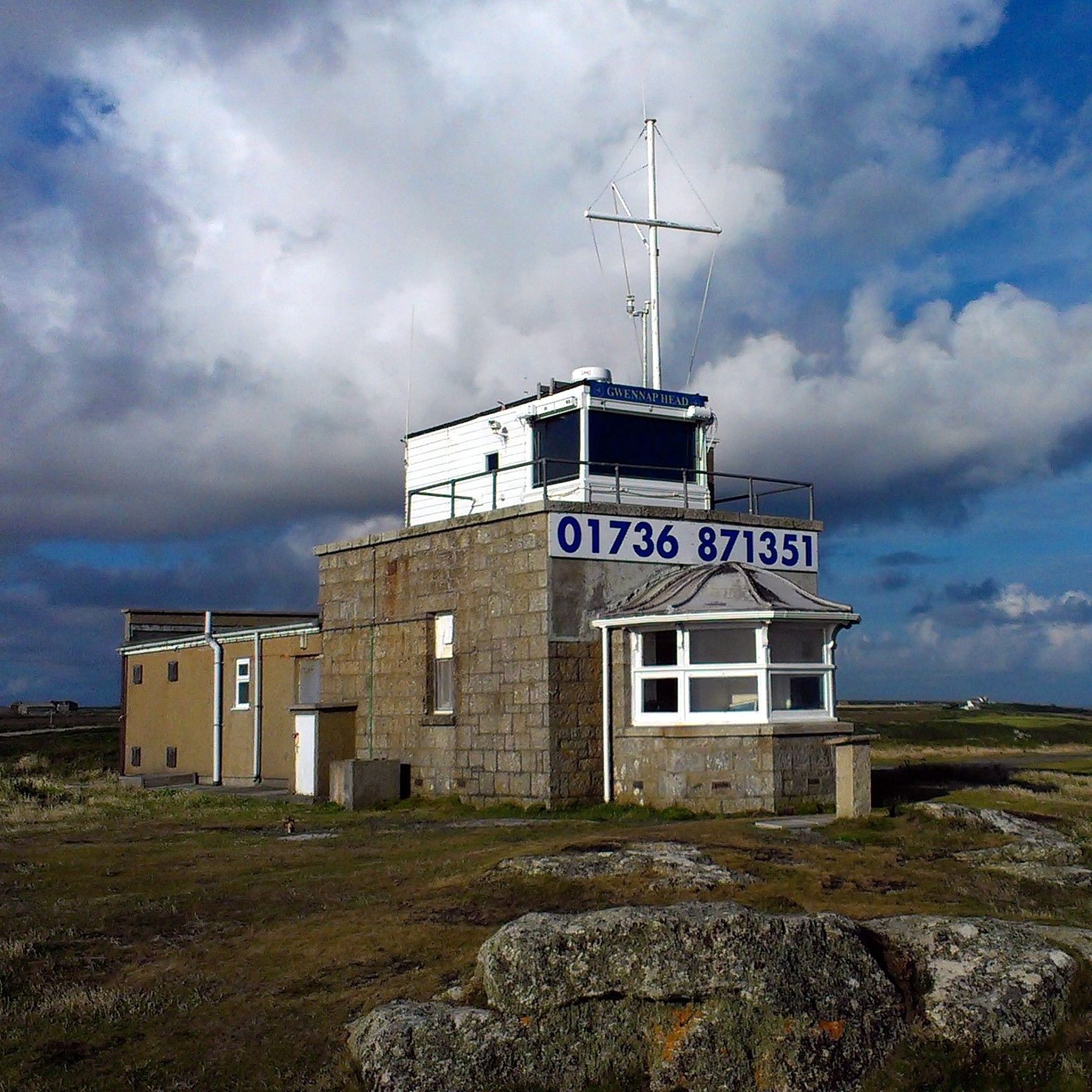
National Coastwatch Institution station on Gwennap Head near Porthgwarra, Cornwall.

There is evidence that the headland has been used as a base for watching ships for centuries. In the museum at Truro there is a photograph of a signal station which has been identified as being on Tol-pedn; the Union Flag dating it to before 1801. Early maps also show a station here and a photograph shows a two-arm semaphore dating to circa 1900–10.

The current prominent building was begun in around 1905, as a one-storey Coastguard lookout station, and was opened by 1910. A second storey was added to give extra height to the watch room after a French trawler was wrecked at the foot of Wireless Point, Porthcurno on 14 March 1956. The Vert Prairial could not be seen when she was wrecked, and seventeen crew lost their lives. The coastguard station was closed in 1994, and re-opened on 21 October 1996 as NCI Gwennap Head.

=== Day marks ===
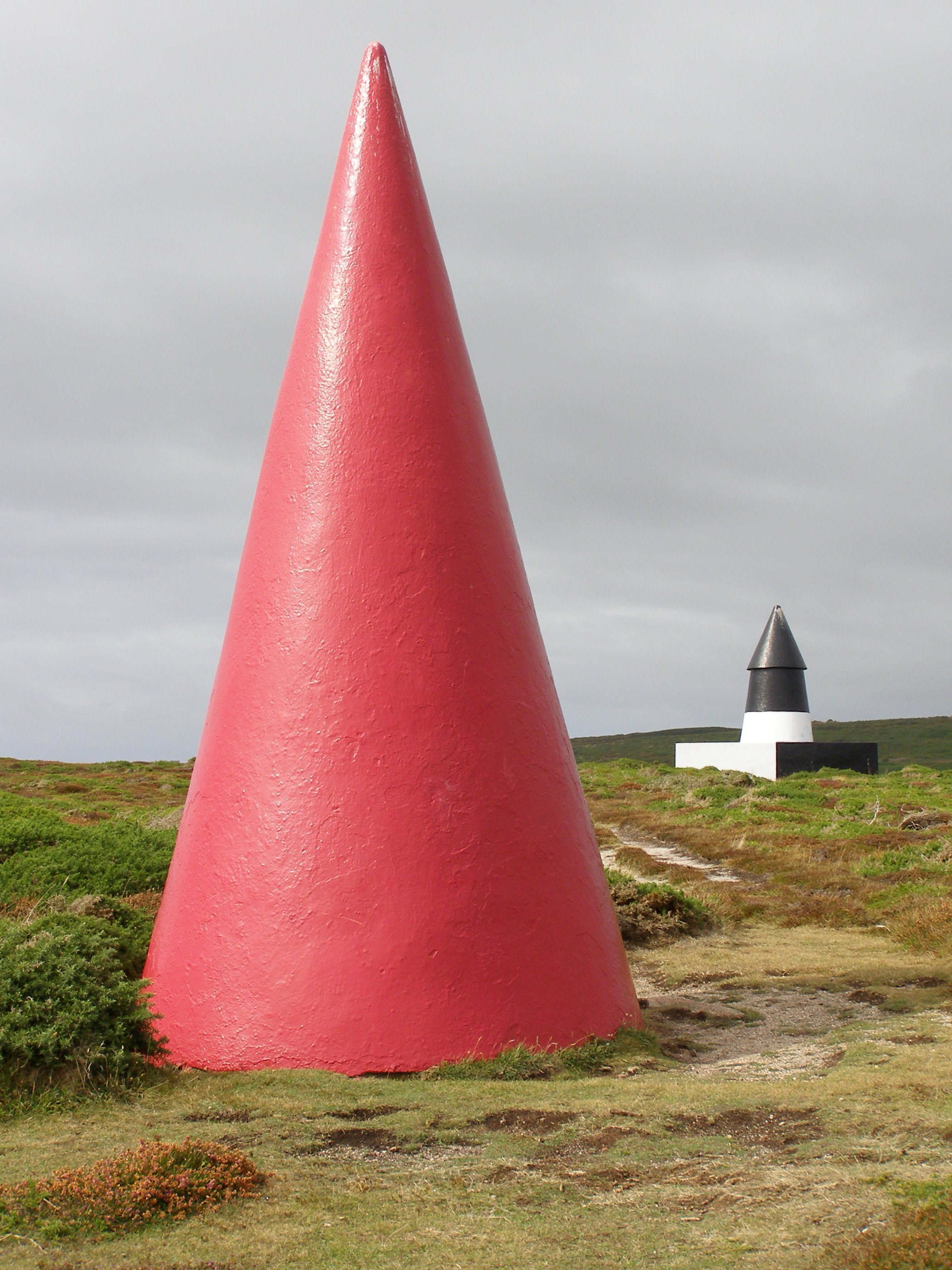
Runnelstone navigation markers on Gwennap Head

There are a pair of cone-shaped navigation markers on Gwennap Head, in line with the Runnelstone buoy. These are day markers warning vessels of the hazard of the Runnel Stone. The cone to the seaward side is painted red and the inland one is black and white. When at sea the black and white one should always be kept in sight in order to avoid the submerged rocks nearer the shore. If the black and white cone is completely obscured by the red cone then the vessel would be directly on top of the Runnel Stone. The black and white landmark was erected by the Corporation of Trinity House in 1821 – an event recorded on a plaque on the back of the marker. Between 1880 and 1923 over thirty identified steamships were wrecked, stranded or sank in the area. There have been none since 1923.

The navigation markers feature as "the Cones of Runnel" in Hammond Innes's 1940 thriller "The Trojan Horse".

== Wildlife and ecology ==
Gwennap Head is part of the Porthgwarra to Pordenack Point Site of Special Scientific Interest (SSSI) designated for its vegetation of waved maritime heath, and for being of considerable ornithological interest; especially for passage migrants. It is renowned for its relative abundance of passing marine bird species with many common species such as northern gannet (Morus bassanus), Manx shearwater (Puffinus puffinus), common guillemot, (Uria aalge), razorbill (Alca torda), northern fulmar (Fulmarus glacialis), shag (Phalacrocorax aristotelis) and cormorant (Phalacrocorax carbo). The headland is favoured by birdwatchers and many travel the length and breadth of Britain to track rare seabirds. In July and August there is a chance to see two large shearwater species outside of their breeding season. The great shearwater breeds in the south Atlantic on islands in the Tristan da Cunha group and the Cory's shearwater (Calonectris diomedea) breeds in the Mediterranean, and on North Atlantic islands; mostly among the Azores. Many birds follow the coast as they migrate north in spring to breed or head south in the autumn to overwinter in warmer places.

At Gwennap Head many waders, ducks, larks and finches are seen especially during the peak times in May and October. Breeding birds include the red-billed choughs (Pyrrhocorax pyrrhocorax) which have recently been breeding successfully on Gwennap Head, but lost their young to a predator in early May 2015.

From 2007 to 2011, the Seawatch SW survey was organised by Dr Russell Wynn with the aim of recording the numbers of targeted species from a designated location close to the cliff edge on Gwennap Head. The survey ran from 15 July to 15 October each year and most of the recording was by volunteers who spent up to twelve hours a day on seawatch. The main targeted species were Balearic shearwater (Puffinus mauretanicus) and basking shark, along with the ocean sunfish (or common mola). Marine mammals such as whales, dolphins and grey seal (Halichoerus grypus) were additional main targets. During a seawatch on 28 August 2015 a red-billed tropicbird (Phaethon aethereus) was seen over the Runnel Stone, a bird that usually frequents tropical areas.

Gwennap Head is part of the Land's End granite massif with shallow, free-draining and acidic soils. The dominant plants of the maritime heath are heather (Calluna vulgaris), bell heather (Erica cinerea) and western gorse (Ulex gallii). Near the edges of the cliff there is maritime grassland and includes the red data species, perennial centaury (Centaurium scilloides), and early meadow-grass (Poa infirma), along with the rare hairy bird's-foot trefoil (Lotus subbiflorus) and yellow bartsia (Parentucellia viscosa). The grassland can be colourful in the spring and early summer with spring squill, thrift, sea campion and kidney vetch in flower followed by the purple and yellow of the maritime heath in mid and late summer.

In 2010 perennial centaury, a national rarity, was refound by Helen and Laurie Oakes. Despite many searches by botanists the species had not been seen in Cornwall (and England) since 1962 (or possibly 1967), and survived on only one Welsh site; coastal footpaths of Pembrokeshire National Park, Wales. The re-discovery follows the re-introduction of cattle grazing under a HLS Stewardship agreement.

Resident butterflies include large white (Pieris brassicae), small copper (Lycaena phlaeas), common blue (Polyommatus icarus), small tortoiseshell (Aglais urticae), peacock (Aglais io), comma (Polygonia c-album), small pearl-bordered fritillary (Boloria selene), speckled wood (Pararge aegeria), grayling (Hipparchia semele) and wall (Lasiommata megera). As well as birds, some insects also migrate and butterflies often seen include clouded yellow (Colias croceus), red admiral (Vanessa atalanta) and painted lady (Vanessa cardui). Migrant moths include rush veneer (Nomophila noctuella), rusty-dot pearl (Udea ferrugalis), hummingbird hawk-moth (Macroglossum stellatarum) and silver Y (Autographa gamma).

=== Marine Conservation Zone ===
The Runnel Stone Marine Conservation Zone (also known as Land's End (Runnel Stone)) was designated on 29 January 2016, covers 20 km^{2} and is based on a 3.5 km arc measured from the NCI lookout. Included is much of the coast from Gwennap Head to Hall Dinas on the east side of Treryn Dinas. As well as protecting deep sea rocks on the Runnel Stone reef, the MCZ also protects other habitats ranging from exposed rock on the coast to soft sediments on the sea floor.

== See also ==
- Runnel Stone
