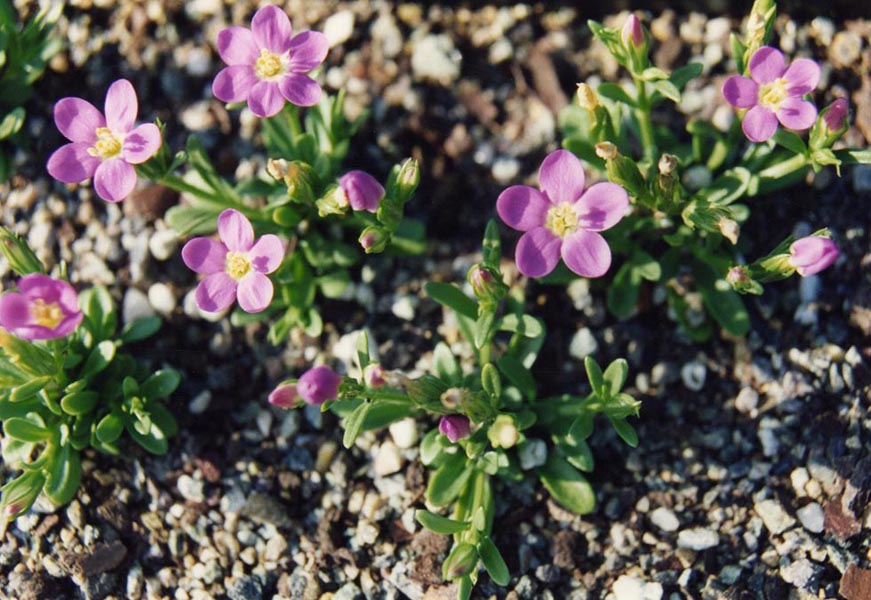
- Centaurium scilloides photographed in France in 2009

Conservation status
- Endangered (IUCN 3.1)

Scientific classification
- Kingdom: Plantae
- Clade: Embryophytes
- Clade: Tracheophytes
- Clade: Angiosperms
- Clade: Eudicots
- Clade: Asterids
- Order: Gentianales
- Family: Gentianaceae
- Genus: Centaurium
- Species: C. scilloides

Binomial name
- Centaurium scilloides (L.f.) Samp.

Synonyms
- Erythraea scilloides (L.f.) Chaub. ex Puel; Centaurium portense; Centaurium massonii hort.

= Centaurium scilloides =

Species of plant

Centaurium scilloides, also known as perennial centaury, is a flowering plant in the family Gentianaceae. It is native to Atlantic Europe (England, western France and the northwestern Iberian Peninsula) and the Azores. Plants from the Azores have white flowers (as opposed to pink) and are genetically different with some treating it as a different species.

== History ==
The species has been in cultivation in Britain since being introduced probably from the Azores by William Aiton in 1777. In 1781, Carl Linnaeus the Younger described the species as Gentiana scilloides, after F. Masson returned with a specieman from Azores.

Before its extinction in England in 1967, Centaurium scilloides was abundant in Cornwall, S.W. England where it was recorded from two settlements Porthgwarra and St Levan between 1952–1967. It survived in Pembrokeshire, Wales where it grows in Newport since its discovery there in 1918. In 2012, the species was recorded from the Azores, but was proven to be of different species.

== Description ==
It is a perennial, herbaceous species, growing to a maximum height of 15 centimetres (5.9 in).

== Habitat and distribution ==
Centaurium scilloides is found on coastal cliffs and dunes grassland. It grows all along the Atlantic coast of Europe.

== Conservation ==
As of 2001, its conservation status was evaluated as 'Endangered' by the IUCN.

== Uses ==
In Japan, C. scilloides, is popularly used for decoration purposes. It is used as a border in rock gardens and grows in pots and on verandas.

== Subspecies ==
- Centaurium scilloides subsp. massonii (Sweet ex H.C.Watson) Palhinha
