= Runnel Stone =

Hazardous rock pinnacle in Cornwall, UK

Coordinates: 50.030°N 5.675°W

- Reef
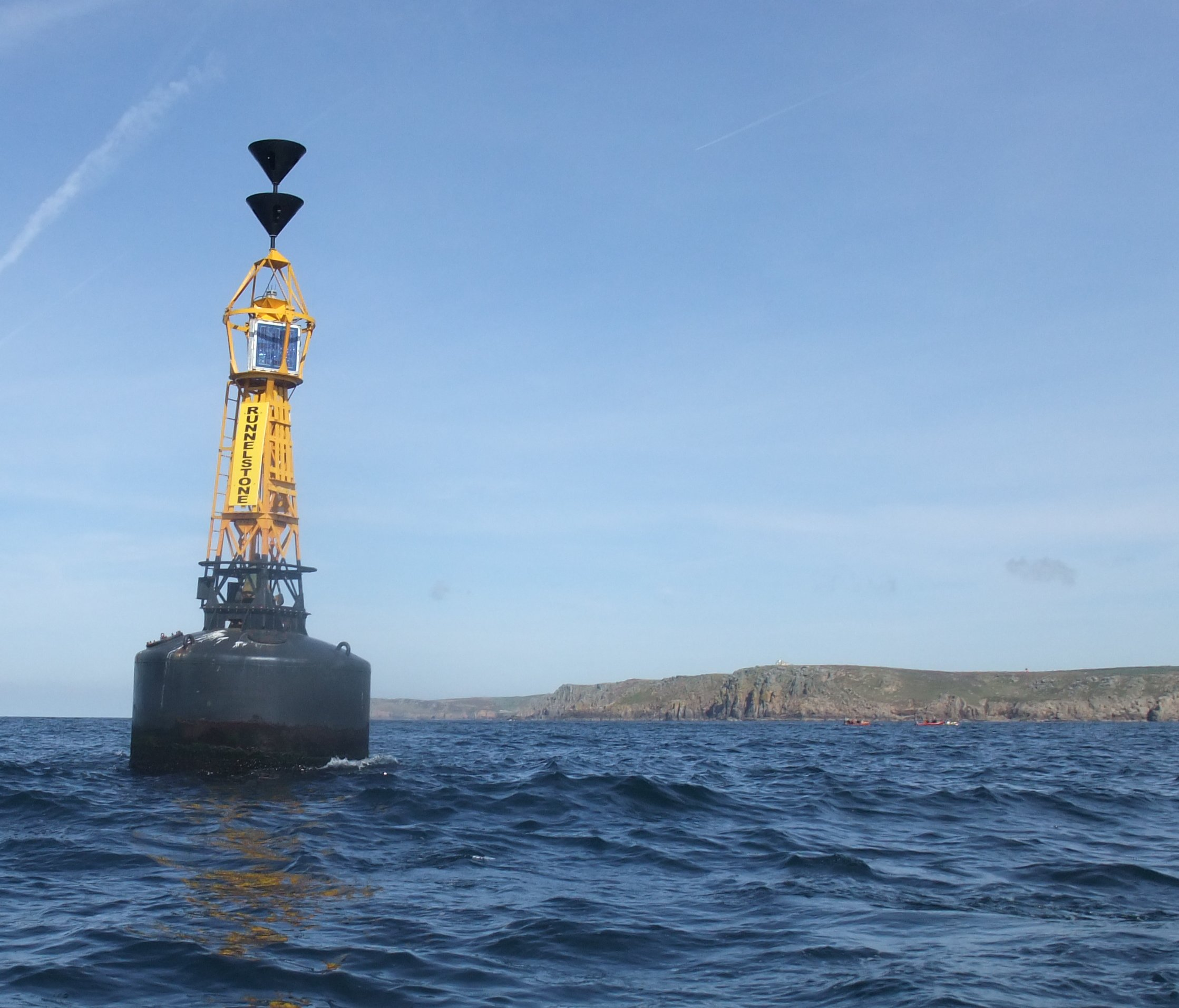
- Cardinal mark anchored to the south of the Runnel Stone to guide ships away from the reef

- Location within Cornwall
- Coordinates
- Location: Cornwall, UK

The Runnel Stone, Runnelstone (Cornish: Men Reunel, meaning stone abounding in seals), or Rundle Stone, is a hazardous rock pinnacle about 1-mile (1.6 km) south of Gwennap Head, Cornwall, England, United Kingdom. It used to show above the surface at low water until a steamship struck it in 1923.

== Marks ==
=== Current ===
==== Runnelstone buoy ====
A buoy currently marks the position of the Runnel Stone. Until May 2012 it was topped with a flashing light, a bell which peals with the movement of the waves and was also fitted with a whistle set in a tube, which emitted a moaning sound when there was a good swell running. This mournful noise could be heard clearly from Gwennap Head, drifting in from the sea, and added to the eerie atmosphere on the cliffs in foggy conditions. In a gale during the 1960s, the buoy became tangled in a drifting cargo ship's anchor line, and the buoy was towed into Mount's Bay. On 13 May 2012, the buoy was replaced by THV Patricia with a larger one, with a whistle to replace the bell.

==== Day markers on Tol-pedn ====
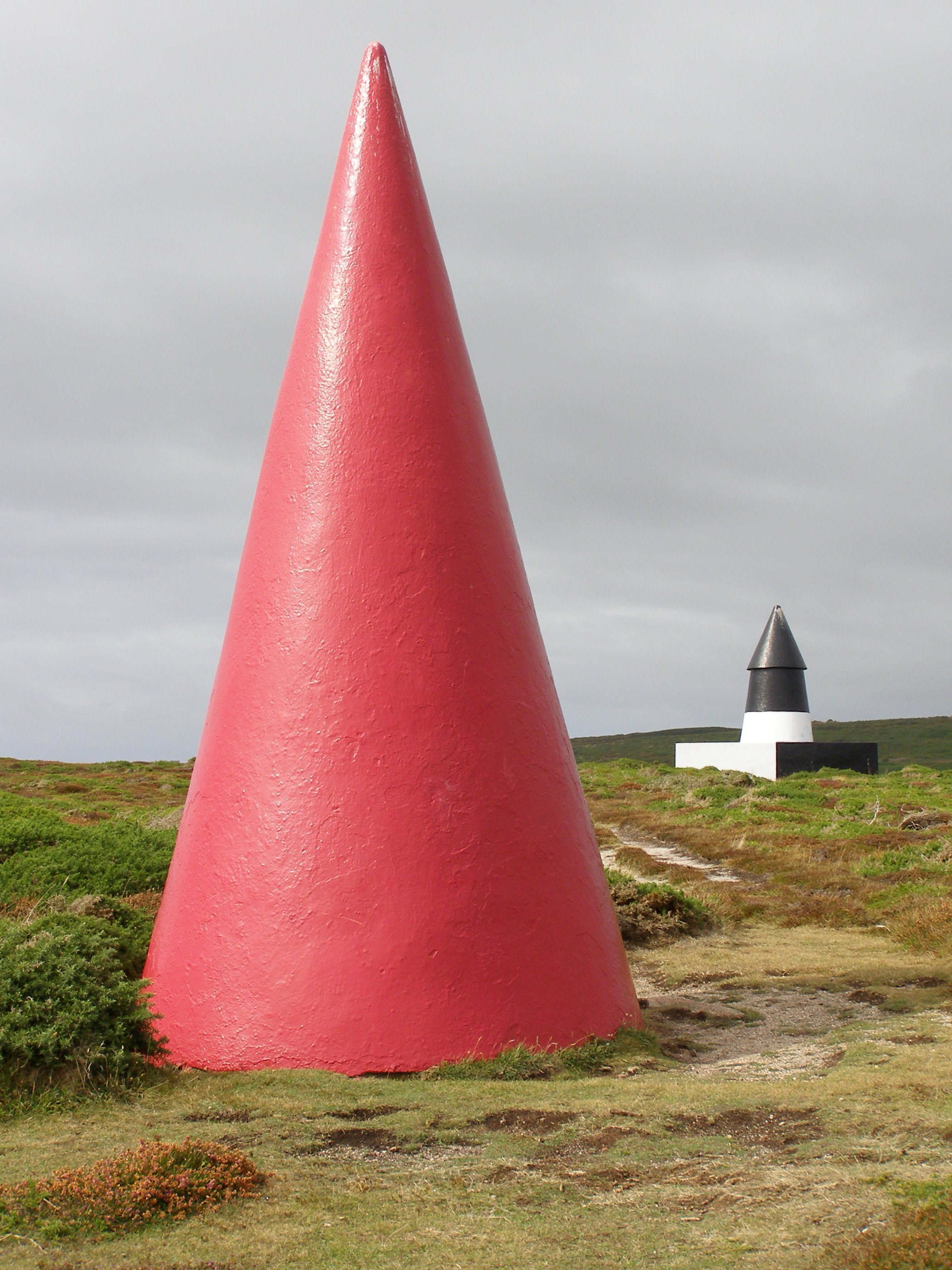
Couple of daymarks on Gwennap Head: when the red cone obscures the black and white one, the observer at sea is directly above the stone

On the mainland, there is a pair of cone-shaped navigation markers on Gwennap Head, in line with the Runnel Stone buoy. These are day markers warning vessels of the hazard of the Runnel Stone. The cone to the seaward side is painted red and the inland one is black and white. When at sea the black and white one should always be kept in sight in order to avoid the submerged rocks nearer the shore. If the black and white cone is completely obscured by the red cone then the vessel would be directly on top of the Runnel Stone. The landmark was erected by the Corporation of Trinity House in 1821 – an event recorded on a plaque on the back of the black and white marker.

=== Historic ===
==== Beacons ====
In 1795, following numerous petitions from mariners for dangers around Land's End to be marked by lights and beacons, Trinity House built a lighthouse on the Longships, and beacons on Wolf Rock and the Rundlestone. The latter, a bare wrought iron pole, was 'soon carried away by the sea'. In 1841, work began on erecting a replacement beacon (designed by James Walker, chief engineer at Trinity House). The process was one of 'great difficulty and danger': only a small portion of the rock protruded from the water, and landing by boat was only ever achievable during spring tides; even then 'the sea was seldom smooth enough to admit of a footing on the rock'. The beacon was completed on 27 June 1843: a wrought iron mast of 6 in (150 mm) diameter standing some 19 ft 4 in (5.89 m) above mean high water springs and topped by a ball-shaped top-mark, 4 ft 3 in (1.30 m) wide (which had been reduced in size from 6 ft after heavy seas were observed to submerge the top of the mast). In October the following year the beacon was snapped off in a gale, leaving a 2 ft (0.61 m) stump (which was itself carried away, following a ship collision, before repairs could be effected). A replacement, 20 feet (6.1 m) high with a 3 ft (0.91 m) top-mark, was installed the following summer and remained in place until 1854, when it too was carried off in a storm. Another replacement was therefore erected, by James Douglass in the spring of 1856, but it too was destroyed in December that same year. Thereafter the decision was taken to mark the hazard with a buoy.

==== Buoys ====
There had been previous attempts to attach buoys, with the first led by the naval Lieutenant Hugh Goldsmith (nephew of the famous poet Oliver Goldsmith) aboard the cutter HMS Nimble in 1824. (After several unsuccessful attempts Lt Goldsmith and a number of his crew turned their attention to, and succeeded in toppling the famous rocking stone, Logan Rock from its precarious perch on the Treryn Dinas headland east of Porthcurno, much to the dismay of local people.) Buoys were also placed from time to time in the absence of the beacon.

Douglass designed the first permanent Rundlestone bell buoy following the destruction of his 1856 beacon; it had a ball-shaped top-mark and the bell was struck by four clappers. Various buoys have since been attached, as in December 1880 when the local newspaper (The Cornishman) reported that the Trinity House vessel Stella put into Penzance with about 30 tons of mooring-chain, etc. for the Sevenstones Lightship and the Rundlestone buoy. A second buoy was attached in June 1881 with a bell and four large iron balls which ran in grooves. As one side of the buoy was raised by a wave, the movement sent one of the balls against the bell. The buoy and the mooring costs was paid for by the blacksmith who designed it. People living at Tol-pedn and Porthgwarra were asked to listen for the two ″bell-buoys″ as a means to test the new buoy. Another buoy, Sherwell's patent bell-buoy, was placed nearby in Autumn 1881 and was substituted for the original bell-buoy in March 1882. The Cornishman newspaper reported in March 1883 that the spherical buoy was removed and replaced with a bell buoy, which was knocked off by a passing vessel sometime around October 1885.

==== Other ====
When the Longships Lighthouse was rebuilt in the early 1870s, its fixed white light was provided with a pair of red sectors to indicate nearby hazards, one of which was angled towards the Runnel Stone.

== Shipwrecks ==
Between 1880 and 1923 over thirty identified steamships were wrecked, stranded or sunk in the area.

On a calm midsummer day during World War I, a Royal Navy minesweeper hit the rock despite a local fisherman serving on board as a rating. He was aware that the ship was on a collision course, but was advised to keep quiet by a colleague in case he might be disciplined for criticising his superiors.

On a foggy day at 3pm on 8 October 1923, the 6,000 ton City of Westminster, bound from Belfast to Rotterdam with a cargo of South African maize, knocked the top of the reef clean off. A total of seventy-two people were taken off by the Sennen and Penlee lifeboats. Today, the remains of the ship lie in 30 metres (98 ft) of water, jammed into a gully on the eastern side of the stone. The rock is now less dangerous and there have been no wrecks since, although the Zeebrugge trawler Stella Mary (Z525) struck the Runnelstone before sinking on 14 February 2023. The crew were rescued by the Sennen Cove Lifeboat.

== Diving ==
Due to its exposure to the ocean currents and its relative accessibility of slipways at Porthgwarra and Lamorna, the Runnel Stone is known as one of the best dive sites in the whole of Cornwall. Diving must be carried out at slack water, which is about one and a half hours before high water at Newlyn. The highlights include visibility of up to 20m, numerous wrecks, and anemones in a vast array of colours.

== Marine Conservation Zone ==
The Runnel Stone Marine Conservation Zone (also known as Land's End (Runnel Stone)) was designated on 29 January 2016 and covers 20 km². The Conservation Zone boundary is a 3.5 km arc based on and to the south of the National Coastwatch Institution lookout on Gwennap Head. Included is the coast from Gwennap Head to Hall Dinas on the east side of Treryn Dinas. As well as protecting deep sea rocks on the Runnel Stone reef, the MCZ also protects other habitats ranging from exposed rock on the coast to soft sediments on the sea floor. Animals within the zone include sea anemones, sea fans and sponges.

== Literature ==
The Cones of Runnel are used as a clue in the 1940 World War II thriller The Trojan Horse by Hammond Innes.

In the book The Medley of Mast and Sail: A Camera Record by Hurst, Alex. & others, a Captain Lille describes the harrowing passage he inadvertently took with his ship, the barque Favell, sailing her between the Runnel Stone and the shore on 5 October 1934.
