= Porthgwarra to Pordenack Point =

Protected area in Cornwall, England

- Site of Special Scientific Interest
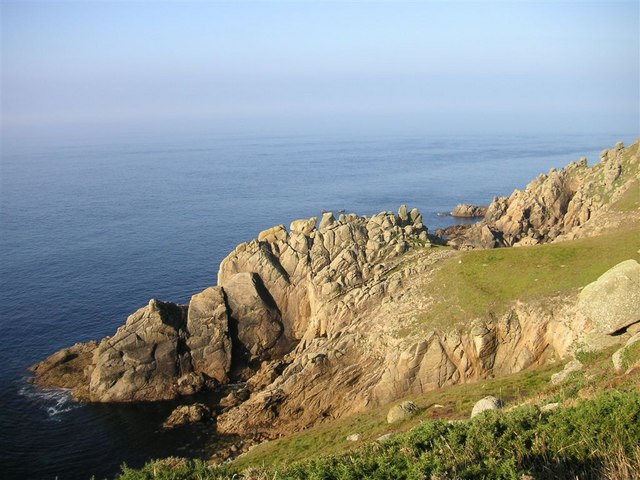
- Headland between Hella Point and Gwennap Head within the SSSI

- Location within Southwest Cornwall
- Location of Porthgwarra to Pordenack Point.
- Area of search: Cornwall
- Grid reference: SW371217 to SW345241
- Coordinates: 50.0444°N 5.6866°W
- Interest: Biological
- Area: 158 hectares (1.58 km^{2}; 0.610 sq mi)
- Notification date: 1977

Porthgwarra to Pordenack Point is a coastal Site of Special Scientific Interest (SSSI) in west Cornwall, England, noted for its biological characteristics. The South West Coast Path runs through the SSSI.

== Geography ==
The 158-hectare (390-acre) site, notified in 1977, is located on the western coast of Cornwall, 2.5 miles (4 km) south of Land's End. It starts in the south at the settlement of Porthgwarra and continues north along the coast of the last sections of the English Channel to Pordenack Point in the north. Other designations are part of the Cornwall Area of Outstanding Natural Beauty, a Geological Conservation Review site, part of the Penwith Heritage coast, Nature Conservation Reviewsite and there are scheduled monuments within the area.

== Wildlife and ecology ==
Porthgwarra to Pordenack Point Site of Special Scientific Interest (SSSI) is designated for its vegetation of waved maritime heath, and for being of considerable ornithological interest; especially for passage migrants. The southern section, Tol Pedn or Gwennap Head, in particular is favoured by birdwatchers and many travel the length and breadth of Britain to track rare seabirds. The headland is renowned for its relative abundance of passing marine bird species with many common species such as northern gannet (Morus bassanus), Manx shearwater (Puffinus puffinus), common guillemot, (Uria aalge), razorbill (Alca torda), northern fulmar (Fulmarus glacialis), shag (Phalacrocorax aristotelis) and cormorant (Phalacrocorax carbo). Forty-five breeding species have been recorded including the red-billed choughs (Pyrrhocorax pyrrhocorax) which have recently been breeding successfully on Gwennap Head, but lost their young to a predator in early May 2015. Other species include Eurasian teal (Anas crecca), which is a rare as a breeding bird in Cornwall and European stonechat (Saxicola rubicola) and common whitethroat (Sylvia communis).

Resident butterflies include the silver studded blue (Plebejus argus), large white (Pieris brassicae), small copper (Lycaena phlaeas), common blue (Polyommatus icarus), small tortoiseshell (Aglais urticae), peacock (Aglais io), comma (Polygonia c-album), small pearl-bordered fritillary (Boloria selene), speckled wood (Pararge aegeria), grayling (Hipparchia semele) and wall (Lasiommata megera). Some insects also migrate and butterflies often seen include clouded yellow (Colias croceus), red admiral (Vanessa atalanta) and painted lady (Vanessa cardui). Migrant moths include rush veneer (Nomophila noctuella), rusty-dot pearl (Udea ferrugalis), hummingbird hawk-moth (Macroglossum stellatarum) and silver Y (Autographa gamma).

In 2010 perennial centaury (Centaurium scilloides), a national rarity, was refound by Helen and Laurie Oakes. Despite many searches by botanists the species had not been seen in Cornwall (and England) since 1962 (or possibly 1967), and survived on only one Welsh site; coastal footpaths of Pembrokeshire National Park, Wales.
