= List of shipwrecks in March 1884 =

The list of shipwrecks in March 1884 includes ships sunk, foundered, grounded, or otherwise lost during March 1884.

== 1 March ==
List of shipwrecks: 1 March 1884
| Ship | State | Description |
|---|---|---|
| Rose | United Kingdom | The steamship was driven ashore at Millport, Great Cumbrae, Inner Hebrides. She was refloated on 27 March and beached. |

== 2 March ==
List of shipwrecks: 2 March 1884
| Ship | State | Description |
|---|---|---|
| Pizarro | United Kingdom | The barque was sighted off Gabo Island, Victoria. She subsequently foundered off the coast of Queensland with the loss of all hands. She was on a voyage from Barrow-in-Furness, Lancashire to Cooktown, Queensland. |

== 4 March ==
List of shipwrecks: 4 March 1884
| Ship | State | Description |
|---|---|---|
| Ama | Sweden | The barque collided with the steamship Bertha (United Kingdom) and sank off Cape Trafalgar, Spain with the loss of all but her captain. She was on a voyage from Cagliari, Sardinia, Italy to Härnösand. |

== 5 March ==
List of shipwrecks: 5 March 1884
| Ship | State | Description |
|---|---|---|
| Chance | Norway | The barque was abandoned in the Atlantic Ocean. Her crew were rescued by the barque Phœnix (Norway). Chance was on a voyage from New York, United States to Stockholm, Sweden. |

== 6 March ==
List of shipwrecks: 6 March 1884
| Ship | State | Description |
|---|---|---|
| Progress | United Kingdom | The schooner collided with the steamship .Nieta (United Kingdom) and drove ashore at Rock Ferry, Cheshire |
| Raja Nattianunhar | Siam | The steamship was wrecked on Pulu Panjang, Cocos Islands. She was on a voyage from Hong Kong to Bangkok. |

== 8 March ==
List of shipwrecks: 8 March 1884
| Ship | State | Description |
|---|---|---|
| Ethel Gwendoline | United Kingdom | The ship ran aground and sank 4 nautical miles (7.4 km) south of Piel Island, Lancashire. Her crew survived. She was on a voyage from Plymouth, Devon to Fleetwood, Lancashire. She was later refloated and taken in to Barrow-in-Furness, Lancashire in a leaky condition. |
| Venture | United Kingdom | The smack sprang a leak and was beached opposite Pladda. Her crew survived. Venture was on a voyage from Troon, Ayrshire to Campbeltown, Argyllshire. She subsequently floated off and sank. |

== 9 March ==
List of shipwrecks: 9 March 1884
| Ship | State | Description |
|---|---|---|
| Samson | United Kingdom | The schooner was driven ashore near Wick, Caithness with the loss of all six crew. |
| Mayflower | United Kingdom | The steamship ran aground on the Annat Bank, off Montrose, Forfarshire. Her crew were rescued by the Montrose Lifeboat. She was on a voyage from the Forth and Clyde Canal to Montrose. |

== 10 March ==
List of shipwrecks: 10 March 1884
| Ship | State | Description |
|---|---|---|
| Helene | Germany | The barque struck a buoy off the coast of Norfolk, United Kingdom and was holed. She beached at Sea Palling. Her sixteen crew were rescued by the Palling Lifeboat. She was on a voyage from Newcastle upon Tyne, Northumberland, United Kingdom to Alexandria, Egypt. |
| Samson | United Kingdom | The schooner was driven ashore and wrecked in Keiss Bay with the loss of all hands, at least two lives. |
| Skarphenden | Denmark | The schooner was wrecked at Sumburgh, Shetland Islands, United Kingdom. She was on a voyage from Copenhagen to Iceland. |

== 12 March ==
List of shipwrecks: 12 March 1884
| Ship | State | Description |
|---|---|---|
| Septimus | United Kingdom | The collier was driven ashore at the Camden Fort, Cork. She subsequently broke up. |

== 13 March ==
List of shipwrecks: 13 March 1884
| Ship | State | Description |
|---|---|---|
| Amethyst | United Kingdom | The steamship was driven ashore at Cimbritshamn, Sweden. She was on a voyage from Liepāja, Russia to Dundee, Forfarshire. |

== 14 March ==
List of shipwrecks: 14 March 1884
| Ship | State | Description |
|---|---|---|
| Albuera | United Kingdom | The ship was sighted in the Atlantic Ocean whilst on a voyage from Tuticorin, India to London. No further trace, reported missing. |

== 15 March ==
List of shipwrecks: 15 March 1884
| Ship | State | Description |
|---|---|---|
| Glenhaven | United Kingdom | The ship departed from the Sapelo River for Cardiff, Glamorgan. No further trace, reported overdue. |
| Martha Jane | United Kingdom | The ship departed from Swansea, Glamorgan for Killala, County Mayo. No further trace,. reported missing. |

== 16 March ==
List of shipwrecks: 16 March 1884
| Ship | State | Description |
|---|---|---|
| Lucia | Germany | The barque was run into by the barque Annie Johnson (United States) and sank with the loss of six of her crew. |
| Mary Boyns | United Kingdom | The schooner was stuck by the steamer Mulgrave (United Kingdom) and sank in the Bristol Channel. Her crew were rescued by Mulgrave. Mary Boyns was on a voyage from Neath, Glamorgan to Penzance, Cornwall. |
| Rayner | United Kingdom | The steamship was damaged by fire at Brăila, Romania. She was on a voyage from Brăila to Antwerp, Belgium. |
| Victoria | Sweden | The brig was abandoned in the Atlantic Ocean (39°31′N 32°46′W). Her captain and six of the crew were rescued by Astoria (Flag unknown). Victoria was on a voyage from Old Harbour, Jamaica to Goole, Yorkshire, United Kingdom. |

== 17 March ==
List of shipwrecks: 17 March 1884
| Ship | State | Description |
|---|---|---|
| Angelo | United Kingdom | The steamship ran aground on the Basfo Reef, off Horten, Norway. |
| Elmira Woolny | United States | The schooner was abandoned in the Atlantic Ocean. Her crew were rescued by the steamship Oranmore (United Kingdom). Elmira Woolny was on a voyage from New York to Norfolk, Virginia. |
| Glanwern | United Kingdom | The steamship was driven ashore at "Scardovari Portobello", Italy. She was on a voyage from Troon, Ayrshire to Venice, Italy. |
| Mokta | United Kingdom | The steamship ran aground at "Zafarana", Egypt. She was on a voyage from the East Indies to London. |
| Scotia | United Kingdom | The barque ran aground on the Haisborough Sands, in the North Sea off the coast of Norfolk. She was on a voyage from Newcastle upon Tyne, Northumberland to Villaricos, Spain. |

== 18 March ==
List of shipwrecks: 18 March 1884
| Ship | State | Description |
|---|---|---|
| Aristocrat | United Kingdom | The steamship foundered off Île-Molène, Finistère, France. Her crew were rescued. She was on a voyage from Alexandria, Egypt to Hull, Yorkshire. |
| Flowery Land | United Kingdom | The lugger foundered in the North Sea 20 nautical miles (37 km) off Eyemouth, Berwickshire. Her crew were rescued by the fishing lugger Bethel (United Kingdom). |
| Saint Pierre | France | The smack was driven ashore and wrecked near Ballinskelligs, County Kerry, United Kingdom. Her crew were rescued. |

== 19 March ==
List of shipwrecks: 19 March 1884
| Ship | State | Description |
|---|---|---|
| Cambrian Queen | United Kingdom | The ship was driven ashore on Scattery Island, County Clare. |
| Gleamer | United Kingdom | The fishing trawler was run into by the barque William (United States) and sank off the Kent coast with the loss of two of her six crew. Survivors were rescued by William. |

== 20 March ==
List of shipwrecks: 20 March 1884
| Ship | State | Description |
|---|---|---|
| Ardangorm | United Kingdom | The steamship ran aground on Cefn Wrach, off Cardiff, Glamorgan. |
| Ashfield | United Kingdom | The steamship ran aground on Cefn Wrach. She was refloated and resumed her voyage. |
| Atlanta | Sweden | The schooner was driven ashore and severely damaged at Broughty Ferry Castle, Forfarshire, United Kingdom. She was on a voyage from Tayport, Fife, United Kingdom to "Muhlgraben". |
| Dagmar | Norway | The barque was driven ashore near Campbeltown, Argyllshire, United Kingdom. She was on a voyage from Liverpool, Lancashire, United Kingdom to Halifax, Nova Scotia, Canada. |
| Driffield | United Kingdom | The steamship ran aground on Cefn Wrach. |
| Enna | Italy | The steamship was driven ashore on Giannutri. All on board were rescued. |
| Frigorifique, and Rumney | France; United Kingdom | The steamships collided off the Île de Sein, Finistère and both vessels sank. Their crews were rescued. Frigorifique was on a voyage from Pasaia, Spain to Rouen, Seine-Inférieure. Rumney was on a voyage from Cardiff, Glamorgan to Rochefort, Charente-Inférieure. |
| Marengo | United Kingdom | The steamship ran aground in the Humber at Hull, Yorkshire. She was on a voyage from New York to Hull. She was refloated and taken in to Hull. |
| Mary Elizabeth | United Kingdom | The brigantine was driven ashore and wrecked at Portrush, County Antrim. She was on a voyage from Bangor, County Down to Portrush. |
| Petchelee | United Kingdom | The schooner was driven ashore in Ardnell Bay, Ayrshire. Her crew were rescued by rocket apparatus. She was on a voyage from Troon, Ayrshire to Christiania, Norway. |
| Prince Soltykoff | United Kingdom | The steamship ran aground on Cefn Wrach. |
| Sydenham | United Kingdom | The steamship ran aground on the Shoebury Sands, in the Thames Estuary off the coast of Essex. She was refloated the next day and towed in to Gravesend, Kent. |

== 21 March ==
List of shipwrecks: 21 March 1884
| Ship | State | Description |
|---|---|---|
| Assyria | United Kingdom | The ship was driven ashore and wrecked on Texa, Inner Hebrides. Her crew were rescued. She was on a voyage from New York, United States to Liverpool, Lancashire. |
| Elinor | United Kingdom | The brig was driven ashore at Asdal, Denmark. Her crew were rescued. She was a total loss. |
| Thomas Adams | United Kingdom | The steamship sprang a leak and foundered in the North Sea 50 nautical miles (93 km) east of the Farne Islands, Northumberland with the loss of four of her sixteen crew. Survivors were rescued by the smack Thornbeck (United Kingdom). Thomas Adams was on a voyage from Hamburg, Germany to Greenock, Renfrewshire. |

== 23 March ==
List of shipwrecks: 23 March 1884
| Ship | State | Description |
|---|---|---|
| Eagle | United States | The barque was driven ashore on Ereikoussa, Greece. Her crew were rescued. She was on a voyage from New York to Fiume, Austria-Hungary. |

== 25 March ==
List of shipwrecks: 25 March 1884
| Ship | State | Description |
|---|---|---|
| Achievement | United Kingdom | The steam trawler was run into and sunk by the steamship Dunelm (United Kingdom) off Seaham, County Durhame. Her crew were rescued by 'Dunelm. |
| Emily | United Kingdom | The ship foundered off Islay, Inner Hebrides. |
| William Owen | United Kingdom | The schooner ran aground off Faro, Portugal. She was on a voyage from Cardiff, Glamorgan to Faro. |

== 26 March ==
List of shipwrecks: 26 March 1884
| Ship | State | Description |
|---|---|---|
| Heinrich | Germany | The schooner was driven ashore and wrecked at Dungeness, Kent, United Kingdom. Her crew were rescued. She was on a voyage from Antwerp, Belgium to Gijón, Spain. |
| Speculator | United Kingdom | The fishing smack collided with the steamship Pacific (United Kingdom) and sank with the loss of a crew member. Survivors were rescued by Pacific. |

== 27 March ==
List of shipwrecks: 27 March 1884
| Ship | State | Description |
|---|---|---|
| Huntcliffe | United Kingdom | The steamship arrived at Maassluis, South Holland, Netherlands, on fire and was scuttled. She was on a voyage from Middlesbrough, Yorkshire to Rotterdam, South Holland. She was a total loss. |
| Middlesbrough | United Kingdom | The steamship ran aground on the Middelgrunden, in the Baltic Sea. She was on a voyage from Middlesbrough to Stettin, Germany. |
| Ville de Caen | France | The steamship was wrecked at "Jubal". Her crew survived. She was on a voyage from Havre de Grâce, Seine-Inférieure, France to Nouméa, New Caledonia. |

== 28 March ==
List of shipwrecks: 28 March 1884
| Ship | State | Description |
|---|---|---|
| Anne and Mary | United Kingdom | The schooner sprang a leak and was beached at Angle, Pembrokeshire. She was on a voyage from Caernarfon to Guernsey, Channel Islands. |
| Balbec | United Kingdom | The steamship struck a rock about 1 nautical mile (1.9 km) south-east of the Longships Lighthouse, Cornwall ans was beached at Nanjizal, Cornwall. All on board survived. She was on a voyage from Liverpool, Lancashire to Havre de Grâce, Seine-Inférieure, France. |
| Barbara | United Kingdom | The schooner sprang a leak and was beached at Angle. She was on a voyage from Caernarfon to London. |
| Grassbrook | Germany | The steamship collided with the steamship Portia (Germany) and sank at Hamburg. |

== 30 March ==
List of shipwrecks: 30 March 1884
| Ship | State | Description |
|---|---|---|
| Souvenir | France | The schooner was wrecked at Sant Feliu de Guíxols, Spain. Her crew were rescued. |

== 31 March ==
List of shipwrecks: 31 March 1884
| Ship | State | Description |
|---|---|---|
| San Josef | Flag unknown | The derelict vessel was found about 6 nautical miles (11 km) south-east of the Longships Lighthouse, Cornwall, United Kingdom with only a dog on board. She was towed to Penzance, Cornwall by the lugger William and Annie (United Kingdom). |
| William S. Baker | United States | The schooner sank in a gale between New York City and Boothbay, Maine. Lost with all five crew. |

== Unknown date ==
List of shipwrecks: Unknown date in March 1884
| Ship | State | Description |
|---|---|---|
| Archimedes | Germany | The brig was driven ashore at "Aghalmsand", Denmark. She was on a voyage from Danzig to Rouen, Seine-Inférieure, France. |
| Belgenland | Belgium | The steamship was driven ashore at New York, United States. She was on a voyage from Antwerp to New York. She was refloated and taken in to New York, where she collided with the quayside. |
| Breeze | United Kingdom | The brig was driven ashore at Kingsdown, Kent. She was on a voyage from South Shields, County Durham to Havre de Grâce, Seine-Inférieure, France. She was reflaoted and assisted in to Ramsgate, Kent. |
| Caroline | United Kingdom | The ketch was wrecked on the Tuskar Reef, off Porthcawl, Glamorgan. |
| Cassiope | United Kingdom | The ship was presumed to have foundered in a cyclone near Mauritius. |
| Charles | France | The sloop was driven ashore at Étaples, Pas-de-Calais. She was on a voyage from Saint-Valery-sur-Somme, Somme to Boulogne, Pas-de-Calais. |
| Colon | Flag unknown | The ship ran aground on the Romer Shoal, off the coast of New Jersey, United States. She was later refloated and taken in to New York. |
| Columbus | Netherlands | The brig was abandoned at sea. She was subsequently towed in to Ferrol, Spain. |
| Cygnus | United Kingdom | The brig ran aground at the mouth of the Gun Elbe River, Africa and sank. |
| Esmeralda | United Kingdom | The steamship was driven ashore. She was refloated and put back to Hong Kong. |
| Fayaway | United Kingdom | The schooner was wrecked at Bunbeg, County Donegal. She was on a voyage from Killybegs to Bunbeg. |
| Fleetwing | United Kingdom | The brigantine was driven ashore and wrecked at Chatham, Massachusetts, United States. |
| Gertrude | United Kingdom | The steamship was driven ashore on Sanda Island. Her crew were rescued. |
| G. M. Stephen | United Kingdom | The schooner was run into by the tug Stormcock (United Kingdom). G. M. Stephen was driven into the full-rigged ship Earl of Beaconsfield (United Kingdom) and sank in the Clyde. Her crew were rescued by Earl of Beaconsfield. |
| Grimaldi | United Kingdom | The schooner was driven ashore at Great Yarmouth, Norfolk. She was refloated and taken in to Great Yarmouth in a leaky condition. |
| Hannah | United Kingdom | The schooner ran aground on the Banjaard Sand, in the North Sea off the coast of Zeeland, Netherlands. She was on a voyage from Fowey, Cornwall to Antwerp. |
| Isabella | United Kingdom | The schooner was driven ashore and sank at Campbeltown, Argyllshire. Her crew were rescued. She was on a voyage from Lochcarron, Ross-shire to Liverpool, Lancashire. |
| Jacob Kienzle | United States | The schooner was abandoned in the Atlantic Ocean. Her crew were rescued by the steamship Mentmore (United Kingdom). Jacob Kienzle was on a voyage from New Orleans, Louisiana to New York. |
| J. B. S. | United Kingdom | The brig was wrecked south of Penedo, Brazil. Her crew were rescued. She was on a voyage from Penedo to the English Channel. |
| Joseph and Mary | United Kingdom | The schooner ran aground on the Shingles, off the Isle of Wight. She was on a voyage from Plymouth, Devon to London. She was refloated and resumed her voyage, but was subsequently assisted in to Ramsgate in a leaky condition. |
| Lord Gough | United Kingdom | The steamship ran aground in the Schuylkill River. She was on a voyage from Liverpool to Philadelphia, Pennsylvania, United States. She was refloated and completed her voyage. |
| Maggie | United Kingdom | The ship was driven ashore near Dunbar, Lothian. Her crew were rescued. She was on a voyage from Bridgeness, Lothian to Lindisfarne, Northumberland. |
| Morning Star | United Kingdom | The ship struck the pier at Lowestoft, Suffolk and was beached in a leaky condition. She was on a voyage from Sunderland, County Durham to London. |
| Palmen | Norway | The brig ran aground in the Nieuwe Diep and became waterlogged. |
| Oleander | United Kingdom | The ship foundered before 5 March. Her crew were rescued. She was on a voyage from Shark Bay to Hamburg, Germany. |
| Panay | Spain | The steamship was wrecked off the coast of Paraguay. All on board were rescued. |
| Pizzaro | United Kingdom | The barque was sighted off Gabor Island, off Cape Howe, Victoria/New South Wales in the first week of March whilst on a voyage from Barrow-in-Furness, Lancashire to Cooktown, Queensland. No further trace, reported severely overdue, feared to have foundered. |
| Rose | United Kingdom | The steamship was driven ashore at Farlane Point, Great Cumbrae, Inner Hebrides. |
| Theodor Bernicke | Germany | The barque was wrecked near the Chincoro Bank. Her crew were rescued. She was on a voyage from Belize City, British Honduras to London. |
| Vindobala | United Kingdom | The steamship ran aground in the Schuylkill River. She was later refloated. |
| William Griffiths | United Kingdom | The steamship was lost at Bilbao, Spain. Her crew were rescued. |
| Wismar | Germany | The steamship was driven ashore on the Danish coast. She was later refloated and resumed her voyage. |
