= Porthchapel Beach =

Beach in Cornwall, England

Porthchapel Beach Porth Selevan (Cornish)
- Beach
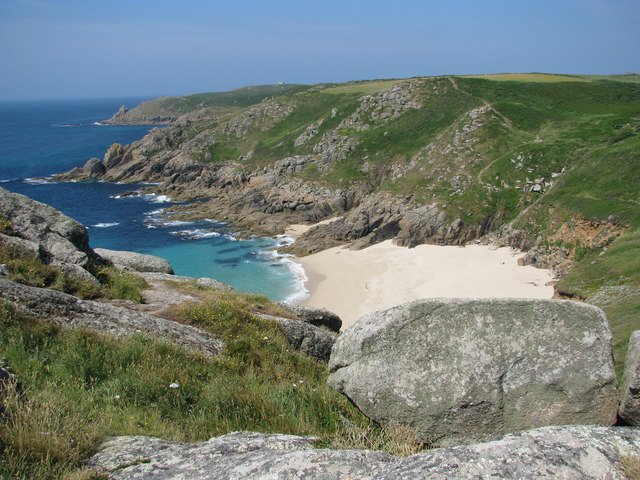
- Porthchapel from Pedn-men-an-Mere
- Interactive map of Porthchapel Beach
- Coordinates: 50.03940°N 5.65829°W
- Location: Cornwall

Porthchapel Beach (Cornish: Porth Selevan, meaning Selevan's cove) is a secluded beach located on the south coast of the Penwith Peninsula in Cornwall, England. Situated near the village of St Levan, it is renowned for its white shell-sand, turquoise waters, and rugged granite cliffs with the The Independent naming it as the sixth most beautiful beach in Cornwall in 2025.

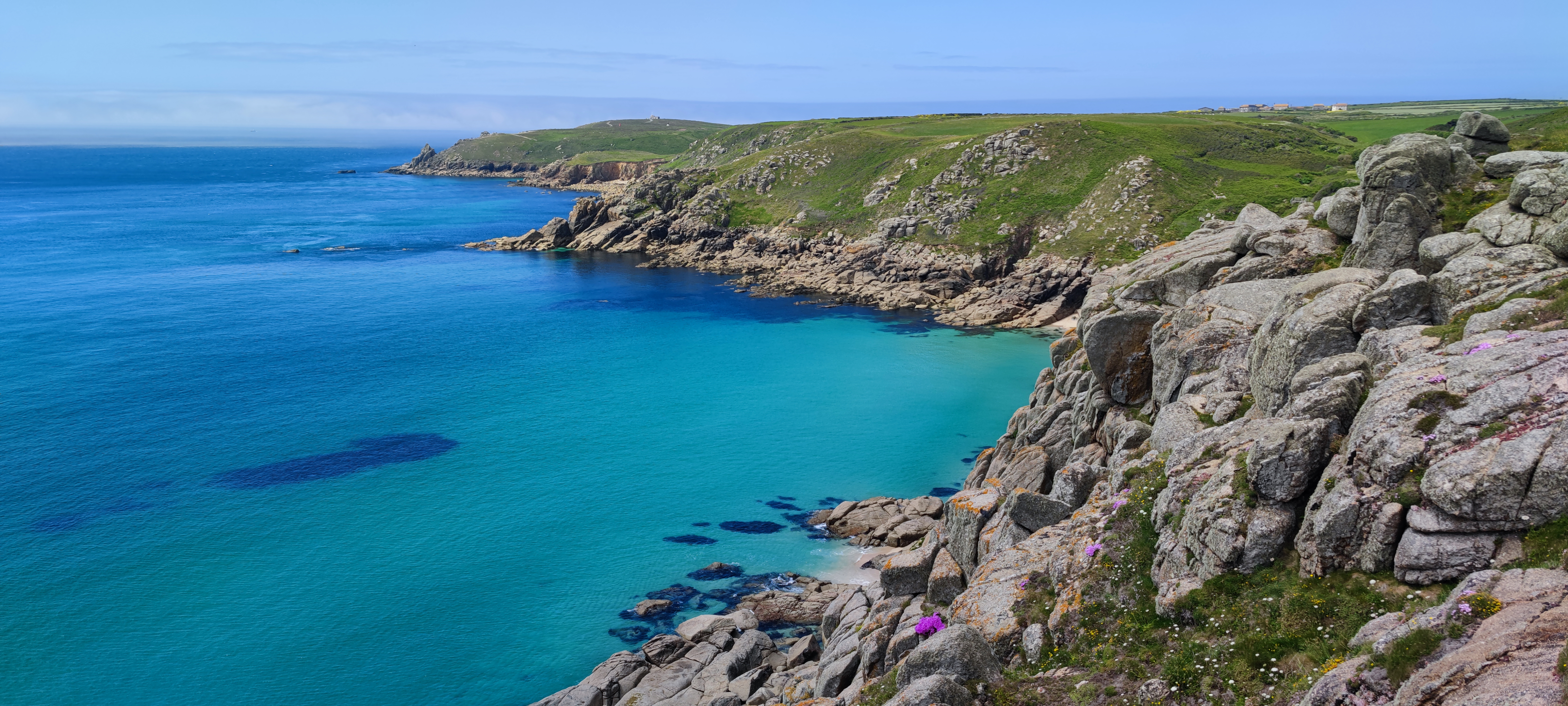
Porthchapel Beach from above

== Geography ==
The beach is tucked between the more famous Porthcurno to the east and Porthgwarra to the west. Part of the Penwith Heritage Coast, the beach is surrounded by granite cliffs and is much quiter than the surrounding beaches due to its limited accessibility.

The beach's fauna includes grey seals, dolphins, and various seabirds such as fulmars and shags.

== History ==
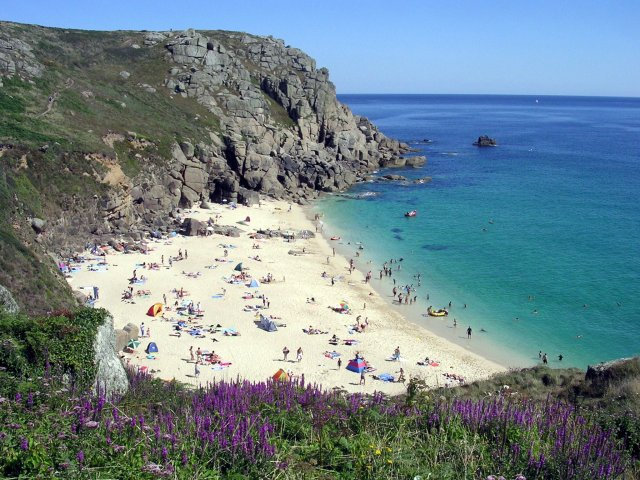
Porthchapel Beach in summer

St Levan’s Holy Well is located above the beach and is still used for baptisms in the parish church. A site which is believed to be the site of a small medieval chapel. The excavation of granite stone steps in 1931 by Reverend H T Valentine and Dr Vernon Favell have dated it back to at least the eight century which wouild make it the oldest Christian chapel in Cornwall. It is also the chapel that the beach is named after.

Annual pilgrimages are made to the beach. The beach is also popular for surfers, however there is no lifeguard cover.

== Folklore ==
A large rock nearby, known as the St Levan Stone, is said to be split in two; legend dictates that when a pack horse can pass through the crack, the world will end.
