= Polgigga =

Hamlet in west Cornwall, England

Coordinates: 50.056°N 5.666°W

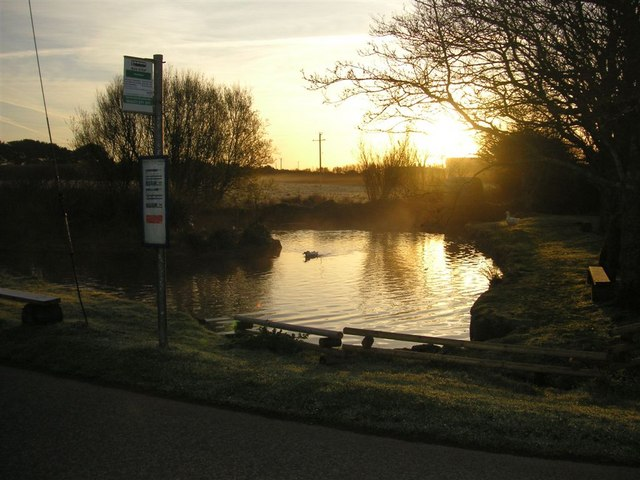
The duck pond and bus stop

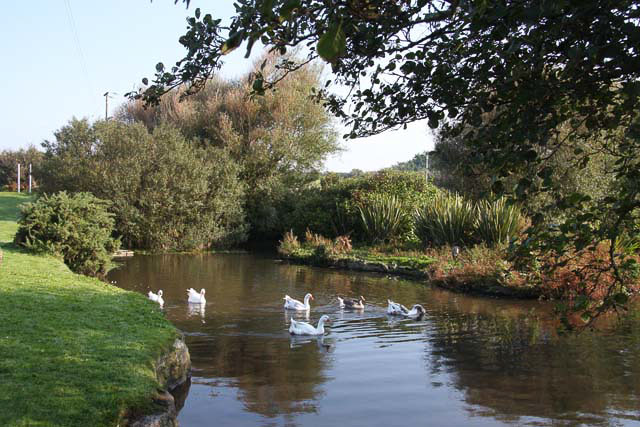
The village pond

Polgigga (or Poljigga) (Cornish: Pollsyger) is a hamlet in west Cornwall, England, United Kingdom, on the B3315 Land's End to Penzance road and within the civil parish of St Levan.

Polgigga is 8 miles (13 km) west of Penzance and 2 miles (3.2 km) east of Land's End. The hamlet used to be home to its own winery and a blacksmith's and is now almost entirely residential. The poet and writer Dylan Thomas lived here for a short period in 1936. Nearby settlements include Trebehor, Trethewey and Bottoms.

== Toponymy ==
Polgigga (or Poljigga) is mentioned in 1327 as Pensiger, meaning head of a stream called Syger. "Syger" in Cornish means lazy, in this case a slow moving stream. "Poll" is Cornish for pool and "legegas" is Cornish for heifer, referring to the small pond near the Vineries.

== History ==
At the time of the Tithe Apportionments in 1838 the parish of St Levan consisted of dispersed farming hamlets such as nearby Trebehor and Trethrewy. Apart from Trebehor Cottages, Polgigga did not exist.

== Dylan Thomas ==
Dylan Thomas first came to Cornwall in April, 1936 and stayed at Polgigga, describing the cottage he lived in as ″We live here in a cottage in a field, with a garden full of ferrets and bees. Every time you go to the garden lavatory, you are in danger of being bitten or stung.″ His dislike of country life, shortage of money and his wish to see his future wife, Caitlin Macnamara, led him to return to London in June of the same year.
