= St Levan's Church, St Levan =

Church in Cornwall, UK

St Levan Church, St Levan
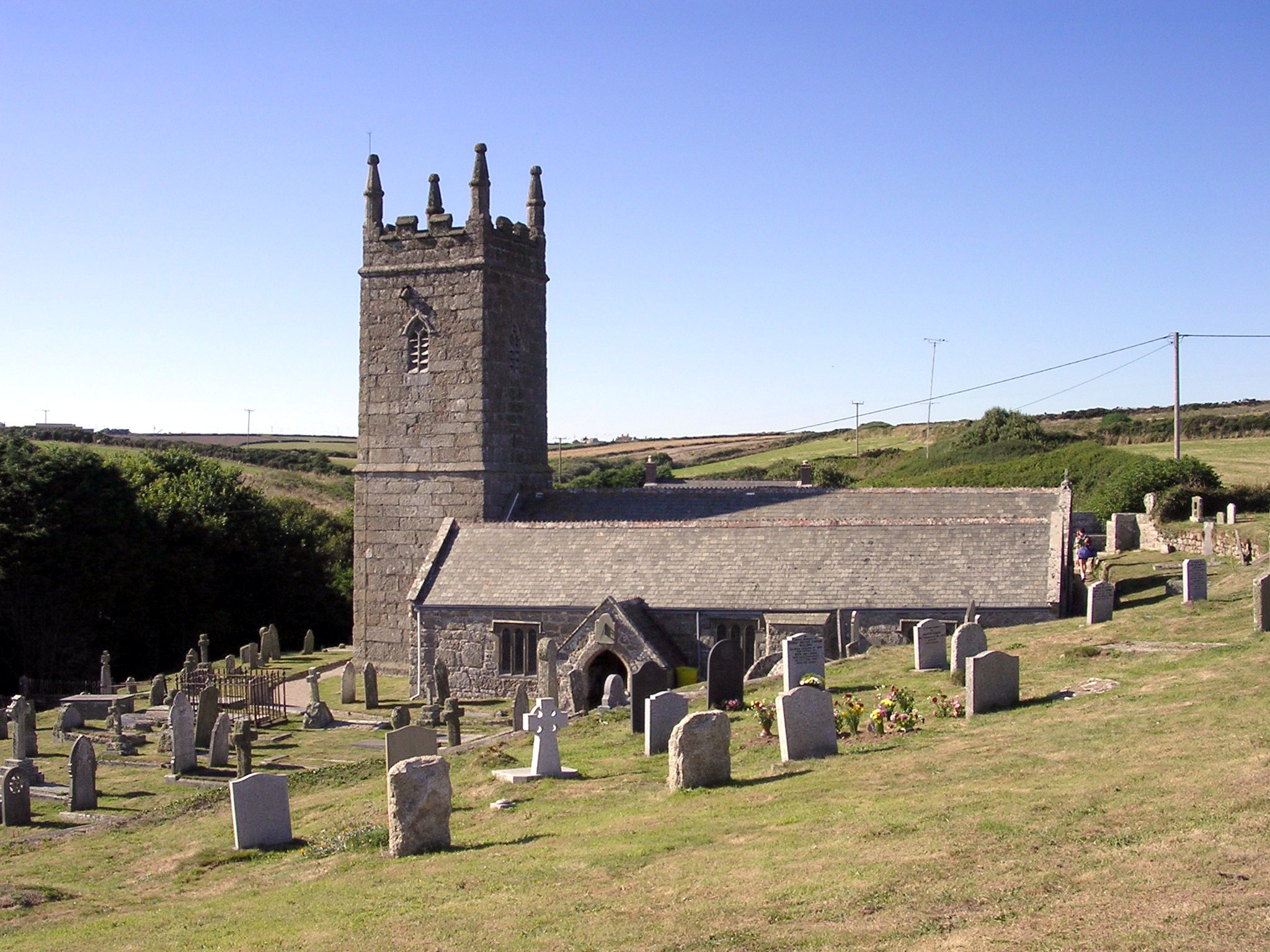
- St Levan Church
- St Levan Church, St Levan
- 50°02′33″N 05°39′36″W
- OS grid reference: SW380222
- Denomination: Church of England
- Churchmanship: Broad Church
- Website: www.stlevanchurch.org.uk

History
- Dedication: Selevan, or Salomon

Administration
- Province: Canterbury
- Diocese: Truro
- Archdeaconry: Cornwall
- Parish: St Levan, Penwith
- Location within Cornwall

Listed Building – Grade I
- Official name: Church of Saint Levan
- Designated: 15 December 1988
- Reference no.: 1143872

St Levan Church, St Levan is a parish church in the Church of England located in St Levan, Cornwall, United Kingdom. Until 1864 the church was a chapelry of the Royal Peculiar of the Deanery of St Buryan. It is now part of the united benefice of St Buryan and St Sennen.

== History ==
The church of St Levan is medieval. It was heavily rebuilt in the twelfth century and extended in the fifteenth century. In 1874 it was restored by J. D. Sedding to a more medieval appearance.

According to the Life of St Kybi, St Levan (properly Selevan, a Celtic form of Solomon) was a Cornishman and the father of Kybi. In the department of Morbihan are four places probably connected to the same saint, who probably lived in the 6th or 7th century. On the cliff at St Levan is St Levan's Well and below it the probable remains of his chapel, which were described by William Borlase in his Antiquities.

William Alsa, a local priest, was hanged for taking part in the 1549 Prayer Book Rebellion.

== Bells ==
The tower contains three bells dating from 1641 (John Beaskam), 1754 (Abel Rudhall) and 1881 (Mears & Stainbank).

== Stone crosses ==
Langdon (1896) records six stone crosses in the parish, of which two are in the churchyard.

== Stained window ==
A stained glass window, the work of Messrs Joseph Bell and Son of Bristol, was placed in the chancel in March 1880. The window depicts Jesus, holding a child, between St Peter and St John and is in memory of Achile Baglehole who died when he fell off the cliff at Land's End in July 1879.
