= St Levan =

Coordinates: 50.041°N 5.662°W

St Levan: Cornish: Selevan
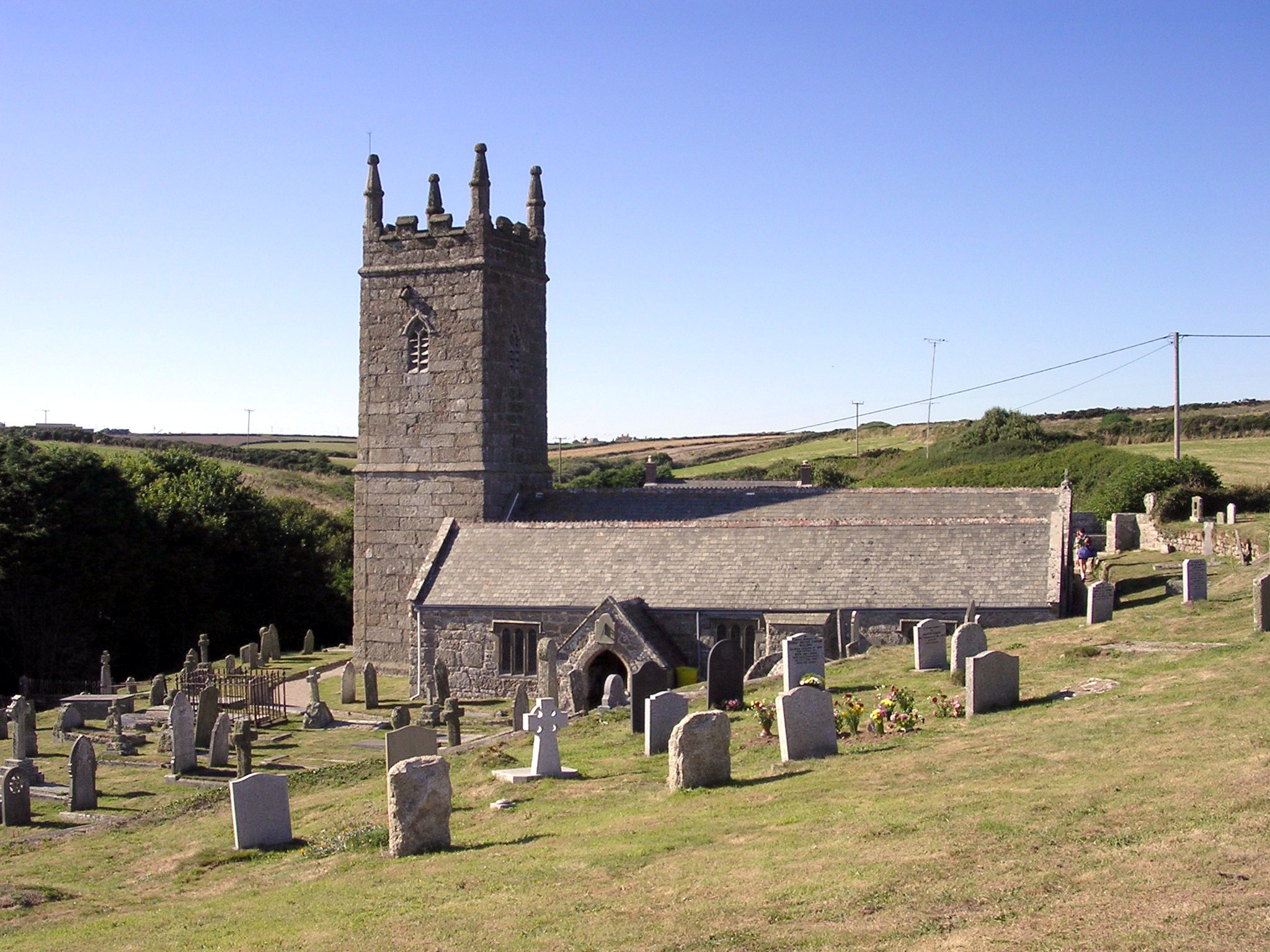
- Parish church of St Levan

- Location within Cornwall
- Interactive map of St Levan
- Population: 459 (2011)
- OS grid reference: SW3822
- Civil parish: St Levan
- Unitary authority: Cornwall
- Ceremonial county: Cornwall
- Region: South West
- Country: England
- Sovereign state: United Kingdom
- Post town: PENZANCE
- Postcode district: TR19
- Dialling code: 01736
- Police: Devon and Cornwall
- Fire: Cornwall
- Ambulance: South Western
- UK Parliament: St Ives

St Levan (Cornish: Selevan) is a civil parish in Cornwall, England, United Kingdom. The parish is rural with a number of hamlets of varying size with Porthcurno probably being the best known. Hewn out of the cliff at Minack Point and overlooking the sea to the Logan Rock is the open-air Minack Theatre, the inspiration of Rowena Cade in the early 1930s.

It is named for St. Salomon of Cornwall, father of St. Kubi. The brythonic form of the name 'Solomon' is 'Selevan', which was later wrongly interpreted as 'Sen Levan', i.e. 'Saint Levan'.

St Levan lies within the Cornwall Area of Outstanding Natural Beauty (AONB) and the South West Coast Path, which follows the coast of south-west England from Somerset to Dorset passes by on the cliffs. There are two Sites of Special Scientific Interest (SSSI), designated for the vegetation and geology, and Gwennap Head in particular, is favoured by birdwatchers, many who travel the length and breadth of Britain to watch rare seabirds.

== Geography ==
The parish church is about eight miles (13 km) south west of Penzance. The parish measures 2,400 acres (10 km^{2}) and the population at the 2011 census was 459. The river in the valley at Nanjizal forms the parish boundary with Sennen and is 3 miles south of the Land's End. From Nanjizal heading south and east, via Gwennap Head, there is 4 miles of coast to Penberth Cove and the boundary with St Buryan. The parish encompasses a number of small settlements which include Bottoms, Penberth, Polgigga, Porthcurno, Porthgwarra, Trebehor, Treen (the chief village) and Trethewey. Both Penberth and Porthgwarra in the past had small fishing fleets despite not having a harbour; the boats were hauled up the slipways when not in use. A small fleet continues to fish out of Penberth, for bass (Dicentrarchus labrax), crabs and mackerel (Scomber scombrus).

== History ==
Neolithic flints have been found dating human activity in the area to 5000 years ago. Fifteen hundred pieces of worked flint and chert from the Bronze Age were found during the 1914 excavation at Pedn-men-an-mere and an Iron Age cliff castle at Treryn Dinas may date back 2000 years or more.

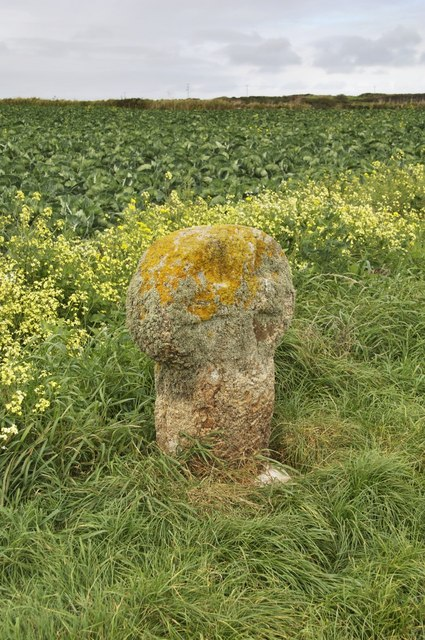
The cross at Rospletha

Many of the hamlets and farms with Cornish prefixes such at Bos and Tre (and possibly Ros) can trace their names back to 600–700 AD while Chy dates back to the 11th or 12th century. The first documentary evidence of a place name is Rospletha, which is mentioned in 1244 and the rest of the other farms are recorded over the next one hundred years. Much of the land belonged to the manor of Mayon, Sennen and in the early 17th century the land was divided between six heiresses, one of whom married John St Aubyn. A later John St Aubyn, became the first Baron St Levan of St Michael's Mount. The St Aubyn's estate purchased the freehold estate of Roskestral in April 1885 for £5,000. As well as the farmhouse and farm buildings there was 96 acres (39 ha) of land including the ″cliff lands″ around Carn Glaze. Much of Porthgwarra, the land around Gwennap Head, as well as the farms Higher Bosistow, Roskestral, Sawah, Trebehor and Trevean are still part of the St Aubyn Estate. Mr T Bedford Bolitho bought the Rospletha estate for £1500 in 1883. The 14 acres (5.7 ha) estate was described as ″fertile land″ and there was also a share of 50 acres (20 ha) cliff.

Above the sandy beach at Porthchapel is a ruined rectangular building with a large flat granite slab and spring known as St Levan's Well. Below, cut into the cliff slope, are two buildings believed to be an early chapel and cell. The remains possibly date to the 7th or 8th century. St Levan's Church is situated in a small valley, inland from Porthchapel. It dates mainly from the 15th century with earlier font, north transept and nave/chancel. Until 1864 the church was a chapelry of the Royal Peculiar of the Deanery of St Buryan. It is now part of the united benefice of St Buryan and St Sennen. There are also two Wesleyan Methodists chapels at Treen (1834) and Trethewey (1868).

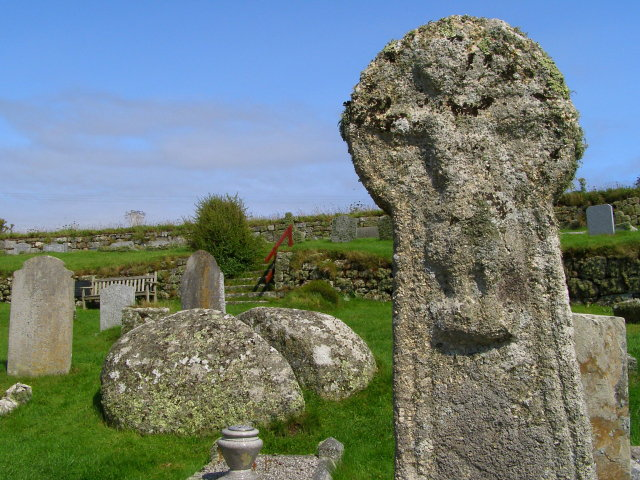
The cross in the churchyard

There are five Cornish crosses in the parish; one in the churchyard, one on the churchyard wall and the others at Rospletha, Sawah and Trebehor.

The first telegraph cable, (from Carcavelos, near Lisbon) was laid on Porthcurno beach in 1870. Lisbon had already been linked to Bombay, making Porthcurno the British terminal of the Empire's telegraph network. A land link was provided to London helping to make Porthcurno a centre of world communications. The Eastern Telegraph Company was formed in 1872, later to become Cable & Wireless. Porthcurno was also a training centre, sending operators all over the world.

== Governance ==
For the purposes of local government St Levan is a civil parish and every four years elects a parish council consisting of ten councillors. The principal local authority is Cornwall Council. Since local government boundary changes in 2021, the parish falls under the electoral ward of Land's End.

== Wildlife and ecology ==
Much of the coast of St Levan parish is designated as a Site of Special Scientific Interest (SSSI) and noted for the vegetation of waved maritime heath and for the geology. Heaths are widespread worldwide but are fast disappearing and considered a rare habitat in Europe. Rock sea lavender (Limonium loganicum) is an endemic plant that is found only in the parish of St Levan. All the colonies are within protected areas but may be vulnerable from climbers or walkers on the lower slopes where it occurs.

Treen Cliff SSSI extends from Porthcurno beach in the west to Penberth Cove in the east. Several rare plant species occur and the site is of particular importance for its maritime heath. Part of the site, Treryn Dinas, is a Scheduled Ancient Monument consisting of a "cliff castle" with four ramparts and ditches, and the Logan Rock was part of the tour of the Land's End area for Victorian tourists. The Porthgwarra to Pordenack Point (SSSI) is noted for its vegetation, and for being of considerable ornithological interest; especially for passage migrants. It is renowned for its relative abundance of passing marine bird species with many common species such as northern gannet (Morus bassanus), Manx shearwater (Puffinus puffinus), common guillemot, (Uria aalge) and razorbill (Alca torda), as well as rarer birds such as Balearic shearwater (Puffinus mauretanicus) and Cory's shearwater (Calonectris borealis). The headland of Tol-pedn (or Gwennap Head) is favoured by birdwatchers and many travel the length and breadth of Britain to track rare seabirds.

Some of the butterflies that can be found on the coast include grayling (Hipparchia semele), silver-studded blue (Plebejus argus), small pearl-bordered fritillary (Boloria selene) and wall (Lasiommata megera). There is also a day-flying moth, the thrift clearwing (Synansphecia muscaeformis); the adult is a bee mimic and the larva feeds on thrift (Armeria maritima).

== Education ==
St Levan CP School is St Levan's community primary school, located in the hamlet of Bottoms. It is a very small school. Its current head teacher is Susannah Storey.

== Notable residents ==
- Harry Etchel Binns (1869–1945), a member of the Newlyn School artist community.
- William Bottrell (born 1816), writer of three volumes of Cornish folk stories
- Rowena Cade (1893–1983), designer of the Minack Theatre
- Thomasine Dennis, the first Cornishwoman to write a novel, Sophia St Clare, published in London, 1806
- John Piper (1903–1992), artist
- Bertrand Russell (1872–1970), philosopher
- James Howard Williams (1897–1958), known as Elephant Bill, soldier, elephant expert and author
