= Trethewey =

Hamlet in Cornwall, England

Coordinates: 50.056°N 5.658°W

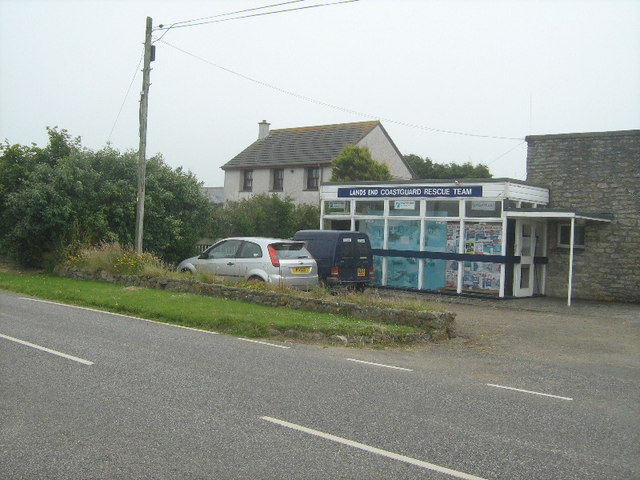
Coastguard base at Little Trethewey

Trethewey (Cornish: Tredhewi Lit. Tre + Dewi (David)) is a hamlet in west Cornwall, England, United Kingdom. It forms part of St Levan civil parish. The village includes a Wesleyan chapel and schoolroom, built in 1868.

Trethewey lies within the Cornwall Area of Outstanding Natural Beauty (AONB). Almost a third of Cornwall has AONB designation, with the same status and protection as a National Park.

The first records of the name may be preserved in the "Calendar of inquisitions post mortem and other analogous documents preserved in the Public Record Office (1904) "which contains a probate inquiry as to the birthdate of 11 September 1296 and the birthplace of Treguwal of Roger Bloyou, although it may be the name of a different or extinct village.
