= Bottoms, Cornwall =

Hamlet in west Cornwall, England

Coordinates: 50.0606°N 5.6545°W

Bottoms: Cornish: Tnowberyan
- Hamlet
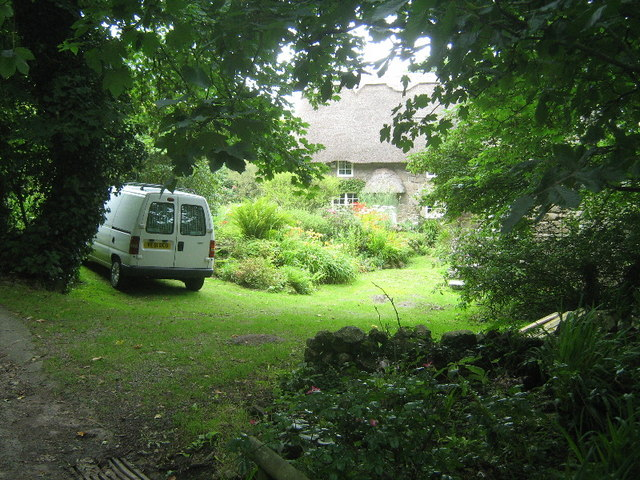

- Location within the United Kingdom
- Civil parish: St Levan
- Unitary authority: Cornwall
- Country: England
- Sovereign state: United Kingdom

Bottoms (Cornish: Tnowberyan, meaning Dale of Beryan) is a hamlet in west Cornwall, England, UK. It is located within the civil parish of St Levan, 5 miles (8.0 km) south-west of the town of Penzance. The hamlet of Trebehor lies further west. It contains St Levan CP School, St Levan's community primary school.
