= Salomon of Cornwall =

British sovereign of the late 5th century

Salomon (also known as Selyf, Selevan) was a late 5th century Cornish 'warrior prince', possibly a King of Cornwall. His feast day takes place on the 18 October. He was the father of the Cornish bishop Saint Cybi.

== Narrative ==
According to Sabine Baring-Gould, Salomon was the son of Geraint ab Erbin, Prince of Dumnonia. This agrees with the Bonedd y Saint, a Welsh genealogical tract detailing the lineages of the early British saints. Salomon married Gwen ferch Cynyr, the daughter of Cynyr Ceinfarfog who had settled at Caer-Goch near St David's in Pembrokeshire. Gwen ferch Cynyr was the sister of Saint Non.

According to the Life of St Cybi, Selevan, (a Brythonic form of Solomon) was a Cornishman and the father of Cybi. Salomon is described as a princeps militiae at a court between the River Tamar and the River Lynher, possibly Gelliwig. Welsh historian Arthur Wade-Evans interpreted this title as 'captain of the guard', while others believe he was a sub-king of Cornwall. David Nash Ford suggests that he succeeded to the realm of his cousin, King Mark.

Lansallos is a foundation of Salomon. Baring-Gould mentions a holy well of his sister-in-law, Non, and a church of his son, Cybi, in the area between Roseland and Grampound.

Salomon is identified with Selevan, of St Levan in Cornwall and Penmon on Anglesey. On the cliff at St Levan is St Levan's Well and below it the probable remains of his chapel, which were described by William Borlase in his Antiquities. The "Selus stone" at St Just in Penwith Parish Church is thought to refer to Salomon. The identity of Saint Just is not known. Among the possibilities mentioned is the Welsh hermit, Saint Iestyn, said to be a son of Geraint ab Erbin.

In the department of Morbihan in Brittany are four places connected to a Saint Saloman. Baring-Gould suggests this is a second, separate individual.

== Sources ==
- Doble, G. H. (1964). The Saints of Cornwall, part 3. Truro: Dean and Chapter; pp. 105–132
- Wade-Evans, A. W. (ed.) (1944). Vitae Sanctorum Britanniae et Genealogiae. Cardiff: University of Wales Press Board
