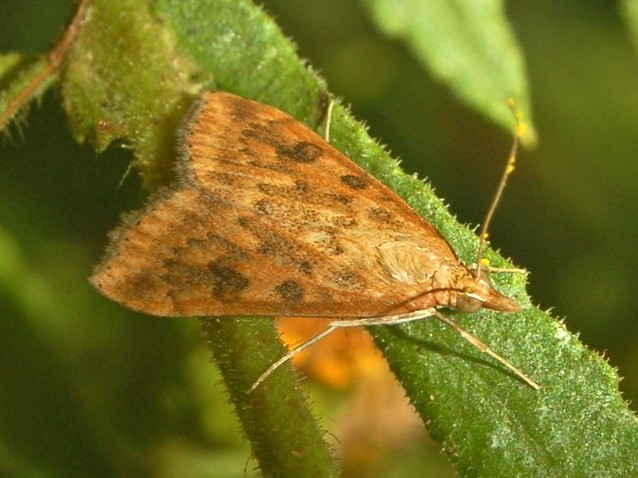

Scientific classification
- Domain: Eukaryota
- Kingdom: Animalia
- Phylum: Arthropoda
- Class: Insecta
- Order: Lepidoptera
- Family: Crambidae
- Genus: Udea
- Species: U. ferrugalis

Binomial name
- Udea ferrugalis (Hübner, 1796)

Synonyms
- Pyralis ferrugalis (Hübner, 1796; Pyralis ferruginalis (Rossi, 1794); Phlyctaenia epicoena Meyrick, 1937; Pionea granjalis Chrétien, 1925; Pionea maculata Costantini, 1923; Pionea obsoleta Costantini, 1923; Scopula hypatialis Walker, 1859; Scopula martialis Guenée, 1854; Udea martialis f. fusca Dufrane, 1960; Udea martialis f. pallida Dufrane, 1960

= Udea ferrugalis =

Species of moth

Udea ferrugalis, the rusty dot pearl, is a moth of the family Crambidae. The species was first described by Jacob Hübner in 1796.

== Distribution ==
This species can be found in central and southern Europe, Asia Minor, Africa, India and Japan.

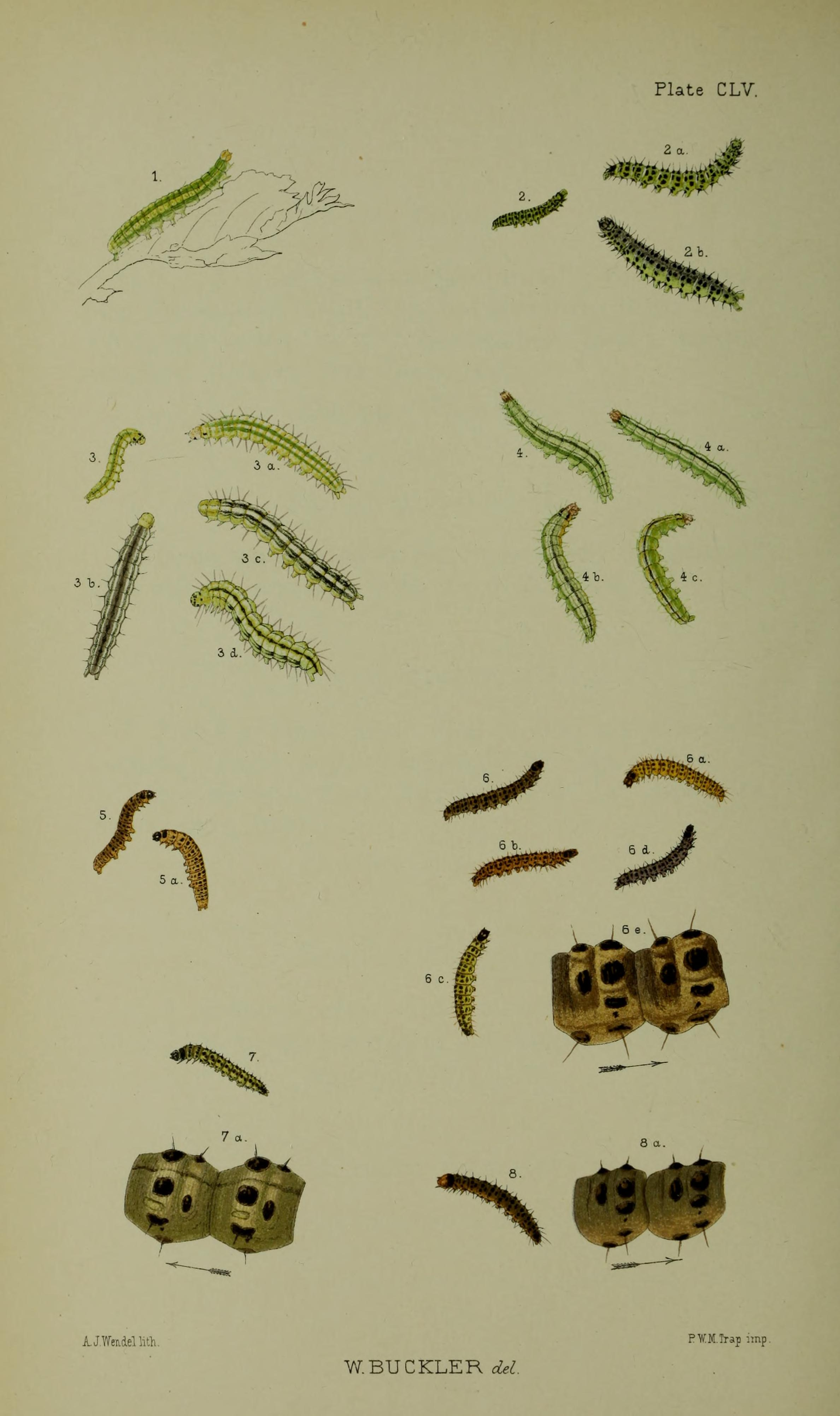
Figs. 4, 4a, 4b, 4c larva after final moult

== Description ==
The wingspan is 18–22 mm. The forewings of these small moths have yellow, brown or ferruginous ground colour and prominent indistinct dark brown or blackish markings towards the edge. Hindwings are brownish grey. Legs are whitish. Caterpillars can reach a length of 10–15 millimetres (0.39–0.59 in). They are greenish with yellowish head.

== Biology ==
These moths are bivoltine or trivoltine. The moth flies through the year, but mainly in the autumn, depending on location. The larvae feed on various herbaceous plants, such as Stachys, Arctium, Lycopus, Mentha, Eupatorium cannabinum and Fragaria vesca. They overwinter in the soil as a chrysalis. This species is sometimes considered a pest, as the larvae attack various crop plants.
