= Porthgwarra =

Coordinates: 50.03763°N 5.67191°W

Porthgwarra: Cornish: Porthgorwydhow
- Location within Cornwall
- OS grid reference: SW371217
- Unitary authority: Cornwall
- Ceremonial county: Cornwall
- Region: South West
- Country: England
- Sovereign state: United Kingdom
- Post town: PENZANCE
- Postcode district: TR19
- Dialling code: 01736
- Police: Devon and Cornwall
- Fire: Cornwall
- Ambulance: South Western
- UK Parliament: St Ives

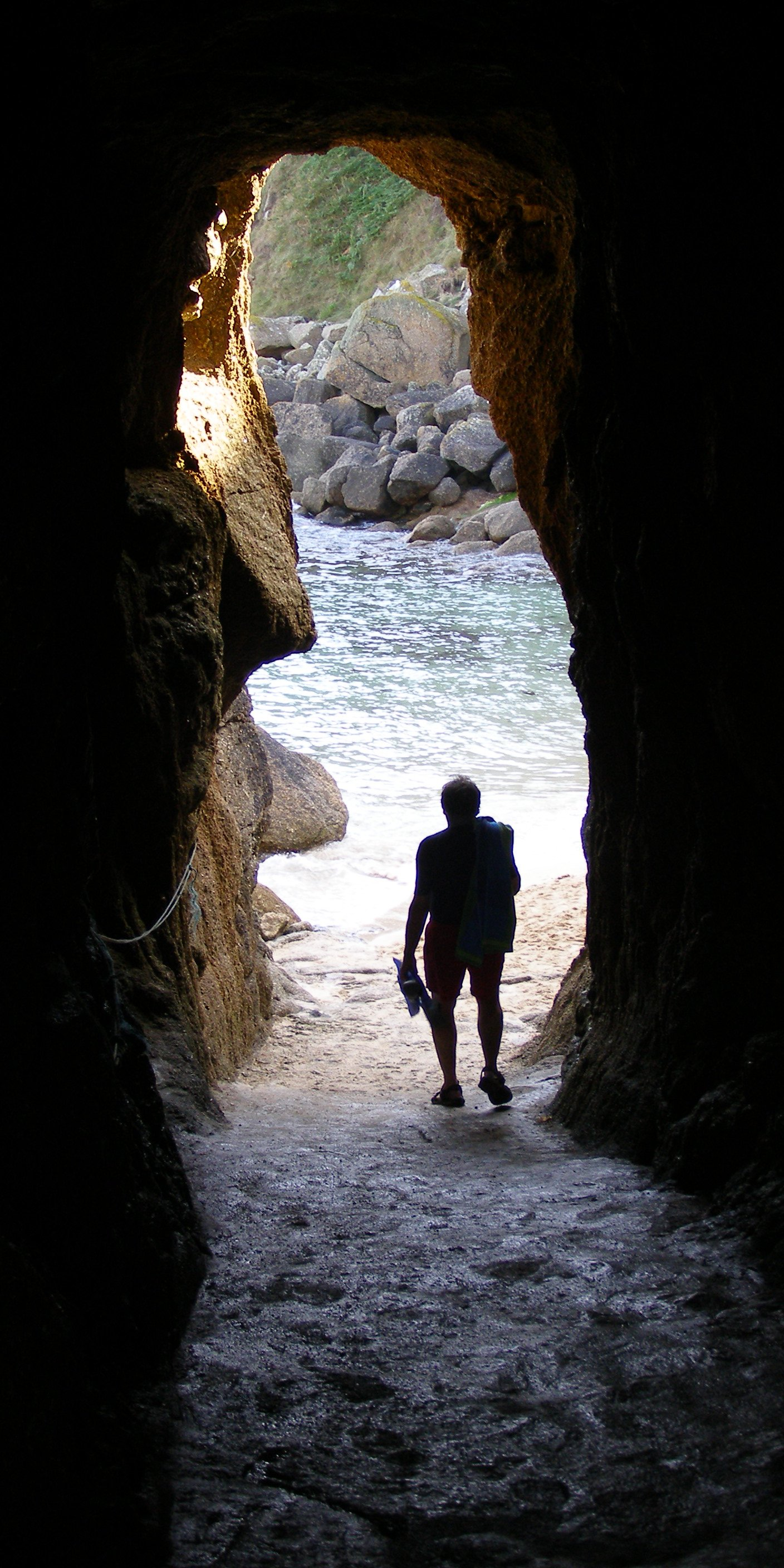
Tunnel leading down to the cove

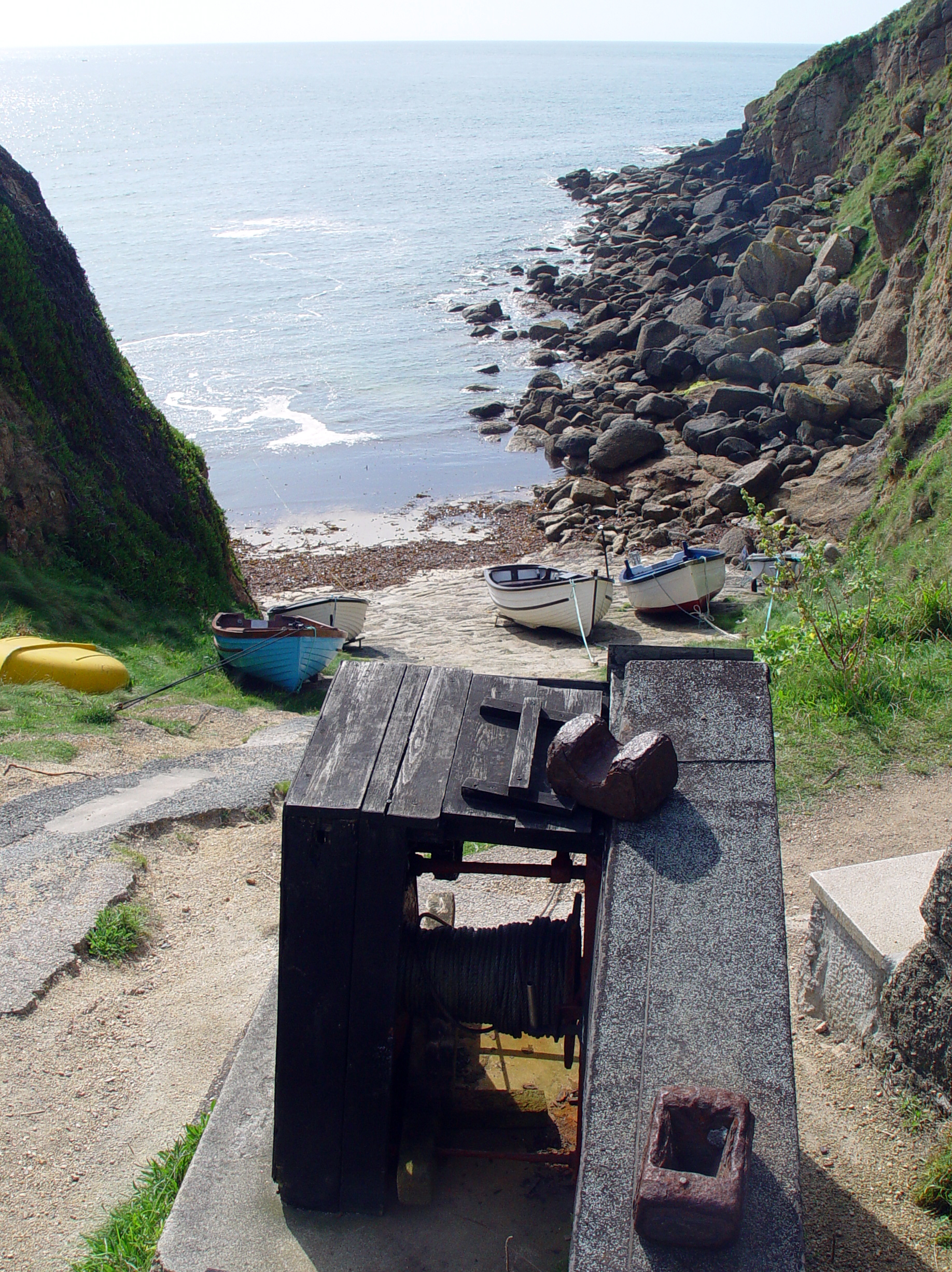
A slipway and winch at Porthgwarra

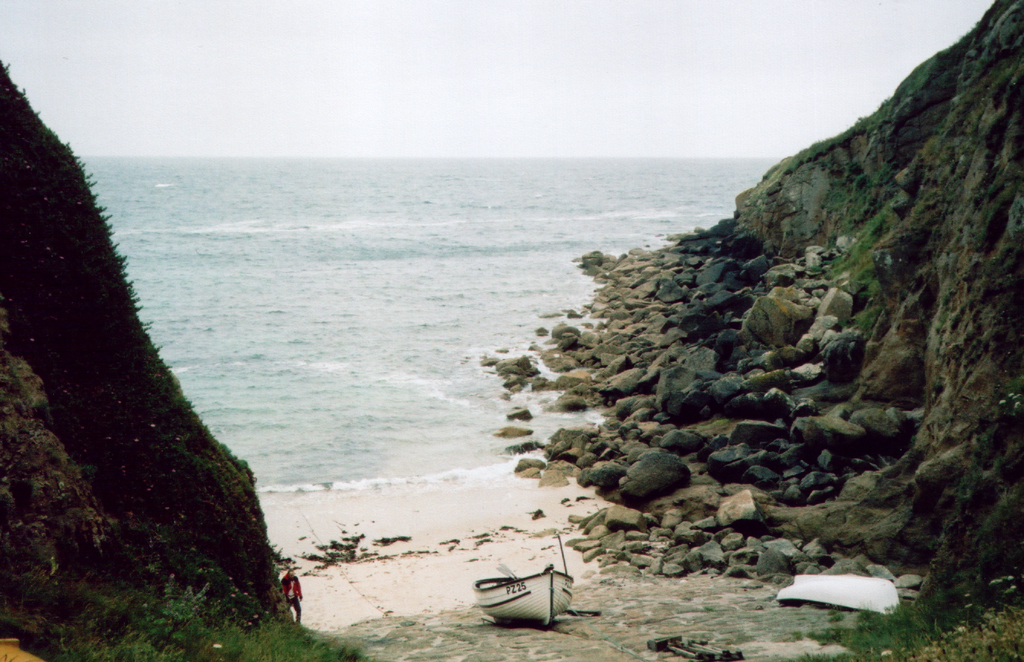
Porthgwarra cove, Penwith

Porthgwarra (Cornish: Porthgorwydhow, meaning cove of wooded slopes) is a small coastal village in the civil parish of St Levan, Cornwall, England, United Kingdom situated between Land's End and Porthcurno. Access to the cove is via a minor road off the B3283 road at Polgigga and leads to the car park in the village. Public conveniences include a pay telephone, a small shop and café. The South West Coast Path passes through Porthgwarra, approximately 90 minutes walk from Land's End and 45 minutes from Porthcurno.

The cove and slipway are privately owned, but the public are permitted to quietly and respectfully enjoy them. Swimming in the cove is quite safe, provided swimmers do not go beyond the headland where there are dangerous, strong sea currents. At the foot of the cove's slipway is a tunnel dug by tin miners from St Just to give farmers horse-and-cart access to the beach to collect seaweed to use as a fertiliser. A second tunnel, leading seawards, is the fishermen's access to the tidal 'hulleys' built in the rocks to store shellfish. The 'hulleys', which ceased being used about 20 years ago, had wooden floors and topcovers with trapdoors and were used to store shellfish prior to taking the catch to market once or twice a week. The rope laid down the beach is used to steady boats while landing.

== In popular culture ==
The area features in the historical drama series Poldark.
