= Gutfeld =

Gutfeld may refer to:

- Greg Gutfeld (born 1964), an American television host, journalist and comedian
- Gutfeld!, an American television show hosted by Greg Gutfeld
- Marc Gutfeld, an American baseball player for the Long Beach Breakers

== See also ==
- Gutfield (ship), a German steamship that ran aground in 1923; see List of shipwrecks of Cornwall (20th century)
