= List of shipwrecks of Cornwall (20th century) =

The list of shipwrecks of Cornwall (20th century) lists the ships which sank on or near the coasts of mainland Cornwall in that period. The list includes ships that sustained a damaged hull, which were later refloated and repaired:

- For ships wrecked both before and after the 20th century see List of shipwrecks of Cornwall
- For ships wrecked off the Isles of Scilly see List of shipwrecks of the Isles of Scilly.
- For ships wrecked on the Seven Stones Reef see List of shipwrecks of the Seven Stones Reef.

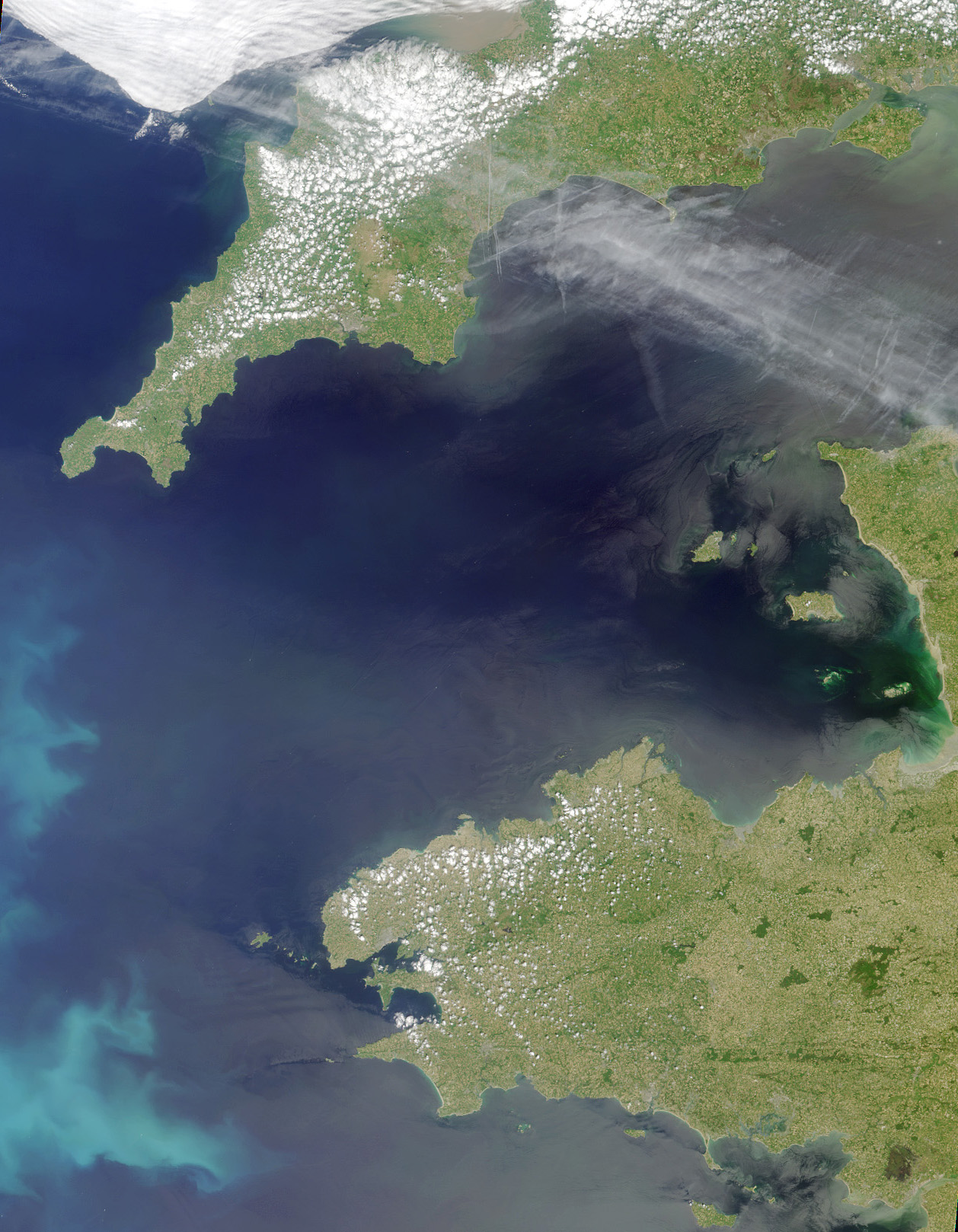
Southwestern England and the English Channel

== 1901–1914 ==
=== 1901 ===
- 7 January – ketch Tenzer (United Kingdom) foundered off Padstow harbour after striking a rock. The crew landed on the ship's boat.
- 19 January – schooner Marie Celine (France) sank near Falmouth.
- 4 February – The Padstow schooner Janie Vivian (United Kingdom ) was driven ashore on the sands below Bray Hill in the Camel estuary. She was taking grain to Cardiff and all the crew survived.
- 28 February – Porthleven sailing vessel Concord (United Kingdom) wrecked on the Outer Trigg rocks at the harbour entrance.
- 14 March – The Amsterdam schooner Voorspoed (Netherlands) ran aground near Chapel Rock, in Perran Bay. The crew escaped via the breeches buoy. The vessel was carrying coal and machinery from Cardiff to Brazil.
- 17 April – schooner Whinfield (United Kingdom) lost off Trevose Head
- 18 November – Penzance schooner Mary James (United Kingdom) bound for Swansea from Newlyn with copper ore lost her mast and sails off the Longships and the wreckage was washed up on the Brisons the next day. The crew of six had been taken off by the Sennen Lifeboat Ann Newbon ( Royal National Lifeboat Institution).
- 7 December – the sailing ship Rodney was wrecked on the coast of Cornwall on voyage from Iquique to France with a cargo of nitrate.

=== 1902 ===
- January – barque Glenbervie (United Kingdom) wrecked at Lowland Point near Coverack. She was heading from London for Port Elizabeth laden with 600 barrels of whisky, 400 barrels of brandy and barrels of rum. The 16 crew were saved by lifeboat.
- 13 May – fishing vessel Devonia (United Kingdom) struck by SS Helmside and sank off Trevose Head with the loss of two lives.
- 27 May – HMS Recruit (Royal Navy) struck rocks half a mile north of Cape Cornwall. Refloated and towed to Penzance by tugs.

=== 1903 ===
- 4 February – Berwick (United Kingdom) of Newcastle wrecked on the Runnelstone; the crew took to two boats one of which reached land and the other with five crew taken to Penzance in the Sennen Cove lifeboat Ann Newbon ( Royal National Lifeboat Institution)
- 1 March – barque Luna (United Kingdom) on passage from New Zealand to Liverpool lost part of her mast and head gear off Pendeen, and drifted onto the Brisons in a north–west–by–west gale. All the crew were lost.
- 11 September – Enterprize (United Kingdom) lost her sails and wrecked in hurricane-force winds off Western Spits, half a mile west of Hayle Bar. The three crew rescued by lifeboat.

=== 1904 ===
- 1 September – steamship Lady of the Isles (United Kingdom) on an excursion hit a sunken ledge off Carn Du and later beached at Lamorna Cove. The passengers had to walk the four miles back to Penzance. She was later salvaged by the Little Western Salvage Company who fitted her out as a salvage steamer and attended most Cornish wrecks over the next thirty years

=== 1905 ===
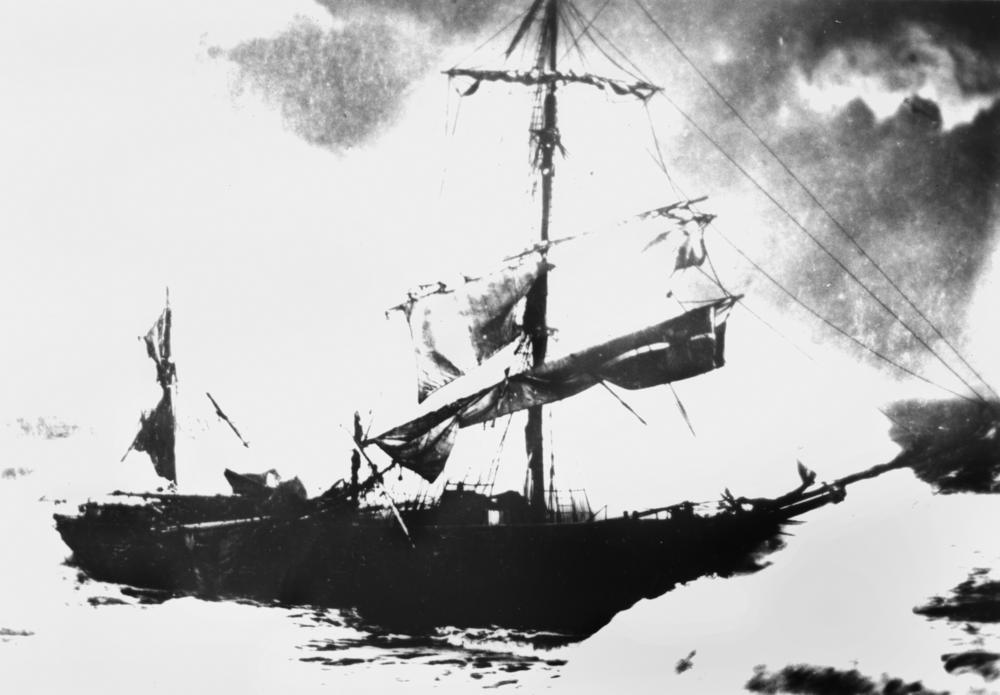
Noisiel shipwreck

- 15 March – the 1,967 ton barque Khyber wrecked in Porth Loe under Tol-Pedn-Penwith. Neither the Penzance or Sennen Lifeboats could reach the ship and twenty-three crew are buried in St Levan's Church, St Levan Churchyard.
- 5 July – Newlyn lugger Diana (United Kingdom) steamed into the Hamburgans Rocks off Penzance promenade when the watch fell asleep. Floated on the late afternoon tide.
- 4 August – the 400 ton steel barque Noisiel (France) was blown ashore in a violent storm at Praa Sands. She was en route from Cherbourg to Savona with a 600-ton cargo of armour plate from the gun turrets of obsolete battleships.

=== 1906 ===
- February – the Workington collier Stainburn (United Kingdom) almost wrecked on the Runnelstone and caught fire. Managed to make her way to Penzance where she was repaired.
- February – the St Ives pilot boat Buller (United Kingdom) with seven pilots on board, capsized, in St Ives Bay when she was hit by a schooner, throwing all her occupants into the water. No fatalities.

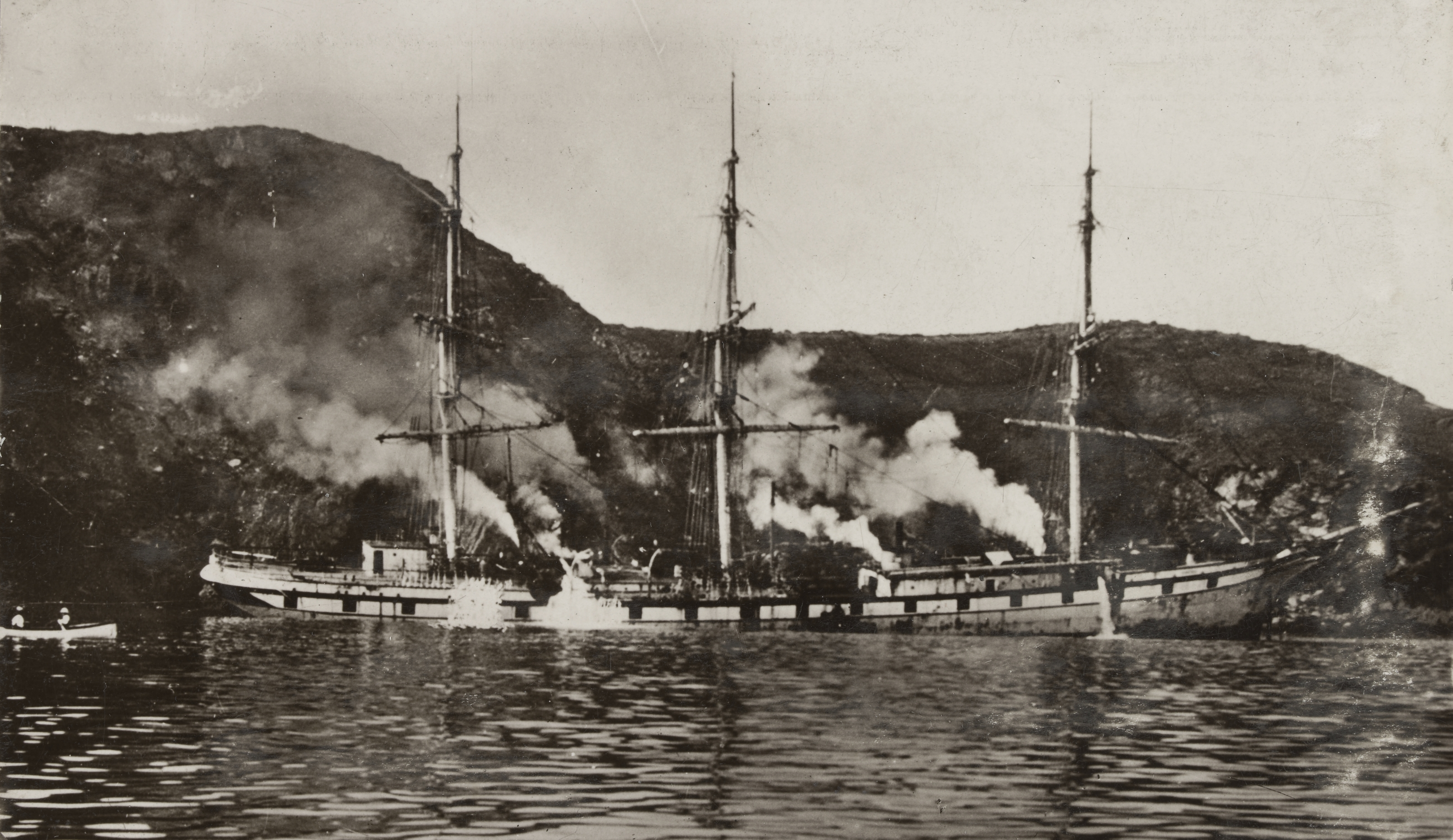
Socoa on fire near coast at Cadgwith

- 21 July – the crew of the ketch Tilly (United Kingdom) abandoned ship when she took on water 20 miles north of Trevose Head.
- 31 July – the French ship Socoa was stranded off Kildonan Point, Lizard in dense fog, she was re-floated after jettisoning 50000 barrels of cement and beached in Cadgwith Cove. She was later towed round to Falmouth and repaired.
- 23 August – the steamer Primrose (United Kingdom) on a journey from her home port of Garston with coal, hit the Low Lee rocks in a thick fog one mile from her destination, Newlyn.

=== 1907 ===
- February – brigantine Julien Marie (France) ran aground at Porthminster Beach, St Ives.
- 17 March – the 12,000 ton liner Suevic (United Kingdom) a White Star Line vessel ran aground in thick fog on the Maenhere ledges off Polpeor, Lizard Point. She was blown in half by salvagers using dynamite and the stern section taken to Southampton to be assembled to a new bow while the old bow was abandoned to the sea. Four lifeboats ( Royal National Lifeboat Institution) saved 456 people from the wreck (the largest number ever saved by the RNLI from a single vessel). She also carried a cargo of wool and mutton, with the wool being collected from beaches and coves, stored on Lizard Green and each man selling his salvage. Also see SS Skytteren in the List of shipwrecks in April 1942.
- 17 October – schooner Susan Elizabeth (United Kingdom) wrecked on Porthminster Beach and the crew rescued by lifeboat. Remains dynamited two years later.
- 1 November – Thames sailing barge the Baltic (United Kingdom) ran onto St Clement's Isle, Mousehole en route to Newlyn with cement for the harbour works. Her crew were saved by Mousehole fishermen on the crabber Lady White who were unimpressed with the non–appearance of the lifeboat stuck in the mud at Penzance. The Baltic ended her days as a hulk in an Essex creek.

=== 1908 ===
- 7 January – Falmouth schooner Lizzie R Wilce (United Kingdom) wrecked on Porthminster Beach. The crew was saved.
- 8 January – Barrow schooner Mary Barrow (United Kingdom) beached on Porthminster beach. The crew were saved and she was refloated a week later.
- 6 March – the lifeboat at Newquay James Stevens No 5 ( Royal National Lifeboat Institution) capsized during a practice launch with the loss of one life.
- 6 March – Isles of Scilly ship Charles Francis (United Kingdom) bound from Newport to St Mary's with coal parted her cables and was swept through Godrevy Sound and wrecked near Portreath. Her crew had been taken off by the St Ives Lifeboat ( Royal National Lifeboat Institution).
- 6 March – after losing her captain near the Longships, the remaining crew of the schooner Hodbarrow Minor beached her at Mawgan Porth, while running before a force 10 gale.
- 20 May – SS Latona (United Kingdom) while on voyage from Montreal to London was in collision with SS Japanic and sank near the Wolf Rock.
- 4 October – steel barque Alice Marie (France) hit the Runnelstone, drifted and sank in Mount's Bay where it is now a dive site.
- 28 December – Fairport (United Kingdom) of Liverpool in ballast was found lying broadside close to the shore at Porthcurno beach after dragging her anchor. She was towed off by the tug Blazer assisted by the Sennen Cove lifeboat Ann Newbon ( Royal National Lifeboat Institution).

=== 1909 ===
- January – fishing lugger FV Pendeen (United Kingdom) lost in a gale. A search by the St Ives Lifeboat did not find any wreckage
- 3 February – Renown (United Kingdom) of Great Yarmouth in the area for the mackerel season ran ashore by Penzance railway station.
- May – schooner Loango en route from Southampton to Newport with a cargo of scrap metal dragged her anchor near St Ives. All four crew were saved
- unknown date – SS Congress (United Kingdom) swamped by a wave off St Ives. Three people swept overboard were rescued.

=== 1910 ===
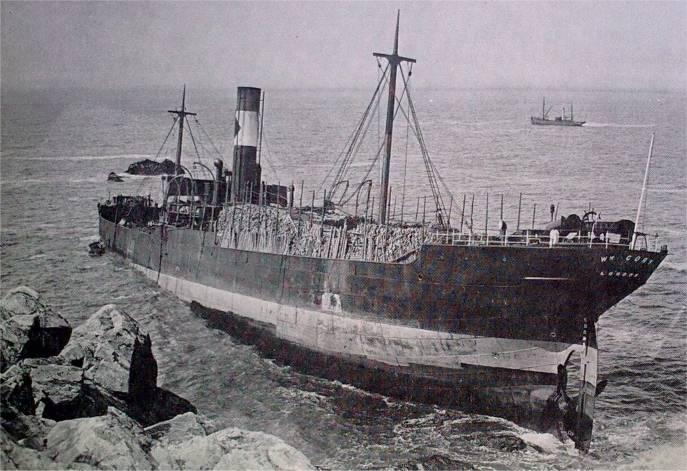
SS William Cory aground at Pendeen

- 22 January – Indefatigable (United Kingdom)while under tow from Falmouth to Cardiff by tug Challenge, they hit heavy weather at Land's End and returned to Falmouth. During the night Indefatigable dragged her anchors and drifted ashore under St Mawes Castle. She was pulled off the rocks by tugs Briton, Dragon and Marian, towed to Falmouth Docks and sold for scrap.
- 13 March – Brixham trawler Harry (United Kingdom) stranded at Porthcurno and taken in tow by the Sennen Cove lifeboat Ann Newbon ( Royal National Lifeboat Institution)
- May – trawler Olivia (United Kingdom) hit by HMS Quail (Royal Navy) off Porthallow. Four men from the village of Flushing died.
- 5 September – steam cargo ship William Cory carrying a cargo of timber from Uleåborg (Oulu), Finland to Newport was wrecked below Boscaswell Cliff, near Pendeen Lighthouse.
- 10 October – schooner Olympe (United Kingdom) beached at Gunwalloe Church Cove.
- November – steamer Wimborne (United Kingdom) was wrecked under Carn Barra Point near Land's End; the crew were rescued by rocket lines from the shore.
- unknown date – ore carrying ship Febrero hit an unnamed rock to the north–east of the Runnel Stone; all hands were lost, bar the cook.

=== 1911 ===
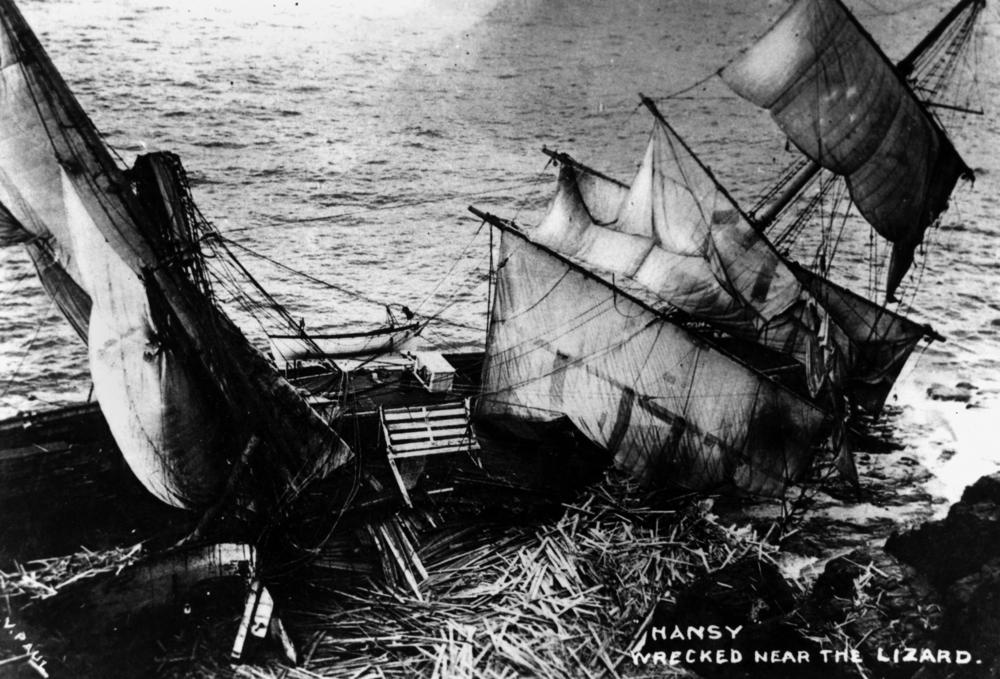
Hansy shipwreck

- 29 April – SS Cragoswald (United Kingdom) hit the Low Lee Reef off Mousehole on a journey from Barry Docks to Venice with 4000 tons of coal. The steamer was on a detour to drop the Chief Engineer at Penzance (for hospital), and mistook the Low Lee buoy for a similar looking one near Porthleven. Refloated.
- 3 May – 1497 ton sailing ship Hansy (Norway) of Fredrikstad was wrecked at Housel Bay on the eastern side of the Lizard. Three men were saved by the Lizard lifeboat ( Royal National Lifeboat Institution) and the rest along with the Captain's family were taken off by rocket apparatus. She was bound for Sydney with building material and her cargo of steel and timber was washed up for weeks afterwards and used in many of the local cottages. One in Church Cove now bears her name.
- 12 November – Irish Schooner, 'Island Maid' (United Kingdom), hit the Doom Bar. All five crew saved by the Padstow lifeboat Arab (
- 12 November – brigantine, Angele (France), ran aground on the Doom Bar, Padstow with only one survivor, the ship's captain (Or 13 November).
- 13 December – barque Saluto (Norway), of Christiansand, wrecked at Cudden Point in Mount's Bay. The ship was a total loss but the Newlyn lifeboat Elizabeth & Blanche ( Royal National Lifeboat Institution) took the crew of 13 men off when she was half a mile off the Greeb Rocks. The ship was bound for the West Indies and was the last big sailing boat rescued in Mount's Bay.
- 29 December – 2,774-ton steamer Hellopes sank in Mount's Bay while on her way to the breakers yard with a cargo of coal.
- December – 500 ton SS White Rose disappeared while on a voyage from France to Liverpool. The remains of the wreck was observed on the Udder Rock, Lansallos some months later. All eleven on board are presumed to have died.
- unknown date – Mousehole lugger Weatherall (United Kingdom) sank about four miles off the Longships when she collided with Lowestoft sailing trawler Trevone (United Kingdom). All the crew, bar Paul Humphreys, managed to scramble aboard the trawler.

=== 1912 ===
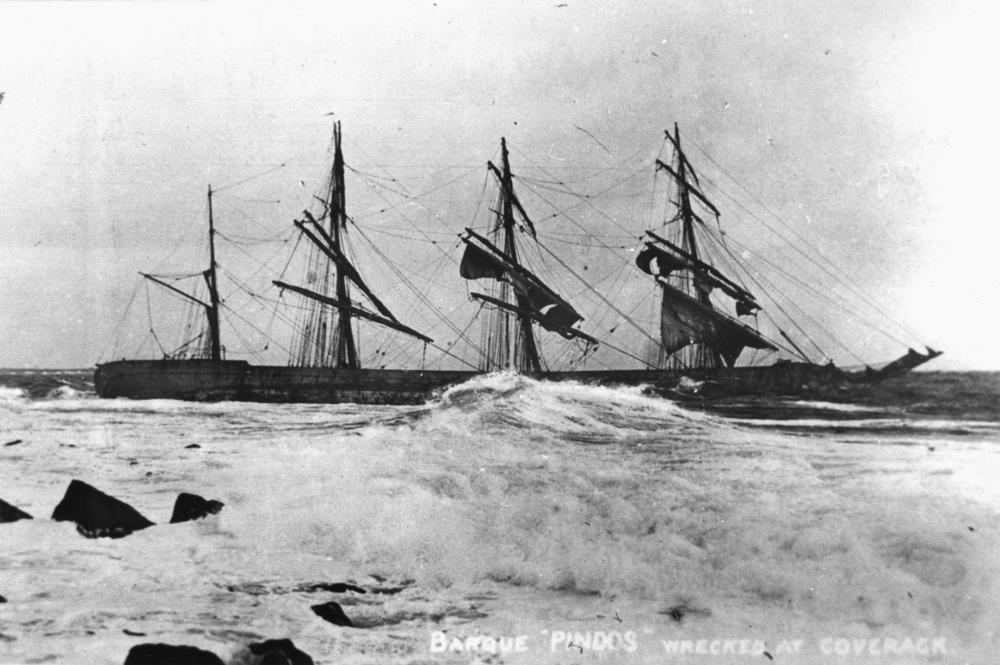
Barque Pindos wrecked at Coverack

- February – barque Pindos (Germany) was wrecked on the Guthen Rocks near Coverack. All twenty-eight of the crew were rescued by the Coastguard and the Coverack lifeboat ( Royal National Lifeboat Institution), and a few days later the ship broke up in a storm.
- 11 February – Fleetwood trawler Maud (United Kingdom) drifted ashore at Pentreath Beach, near Kynance Cove when her tow from the tug Challenger parted. Her boiler and keel can still be seen at low tide.
- 5 March – Bessie (United Kingdom) was forced to shelter in Newquay Bay during a strong north wind and drifted ashore when her anchor fouled. Two of the crew were saved by breeches buoy, the others clambered up the 100 ft (30 m) cliff on the cliff ladder. The Truro registered three-masted schooner was on a voyage from Ballincurragh, County Cork to Penryn.
- 21 March – SS City of Cardiff (United Kingdom) wrecked at Nanjizal, two miles south of Land's End. The Sennen Life–Saving Apparatus Team took the crew off by breeches buoy.
- 6 April – Gunvor (Norway) wrecked on Pedn-Men-an-Mor rocks, Black Head, The Lizard; the crew scrambled to safety.
- 6 April – barquentine Mildred (United Kingdom) struck rocks at Gurnard's Head in dense fog and sank with her sails set. No lives lost.
- July – the steamship Transporter (United Kingdom) of North Shields with ballast from St Nazaire to the Tyne for coal went ashore south of Mousehole in thick fog. The salvage steamer Lady of the Isles hauled her clear and she resumed her journey undamaged.
- 26 December – SS Tripolitania (Italy), was beached on Loe Bar, near Porthleven in 100 mph winds while in ballast from Genoa to Barry for coal. All of her twenty-eight crew, bar one, were saved and the ship was finally broken up for scrap after attempts to refloat her failed. Two of the crew of the Penzance Lifeboat Janet Hoyle ( Royal National Lifeboat Institution) died of pneumonia the following Thursday.
- unknown date – fishing ketch Triumph sank on the Doom Bar.
- ketch Elizabeth wrecked in Bude Bay. Her mast was removed and erected on Summerleaze Point as a flagpole.

=== 1913 ===
- 4 April – ketch Woolwich Infant (United Kingdom) of Falmouth was abandoned by her crew and went ashore near Land's End.
- 14 April – while leaving Porthleven harbour against a south–westerly, the fishing vessel Ebeneezer (PZ 541) (United Kingdom) was wrecked on the Trigg rocks.
- April – Othos Stathos grounded on rocks off Godrevy and towed into St Ives on 24 April.
- 15 May – 2,144-ton barque Queen Margaret (United Kingdom) of Glasgow went ashore at Polpeor while awaiting orders from Lloyds Signal Station. Her cargo of wheat swelled causing her to break up. The crew escaped in the ship's boats while the captain and his family were saved by the Lizard lifeboat ( Royal National Lifeboat Institution).

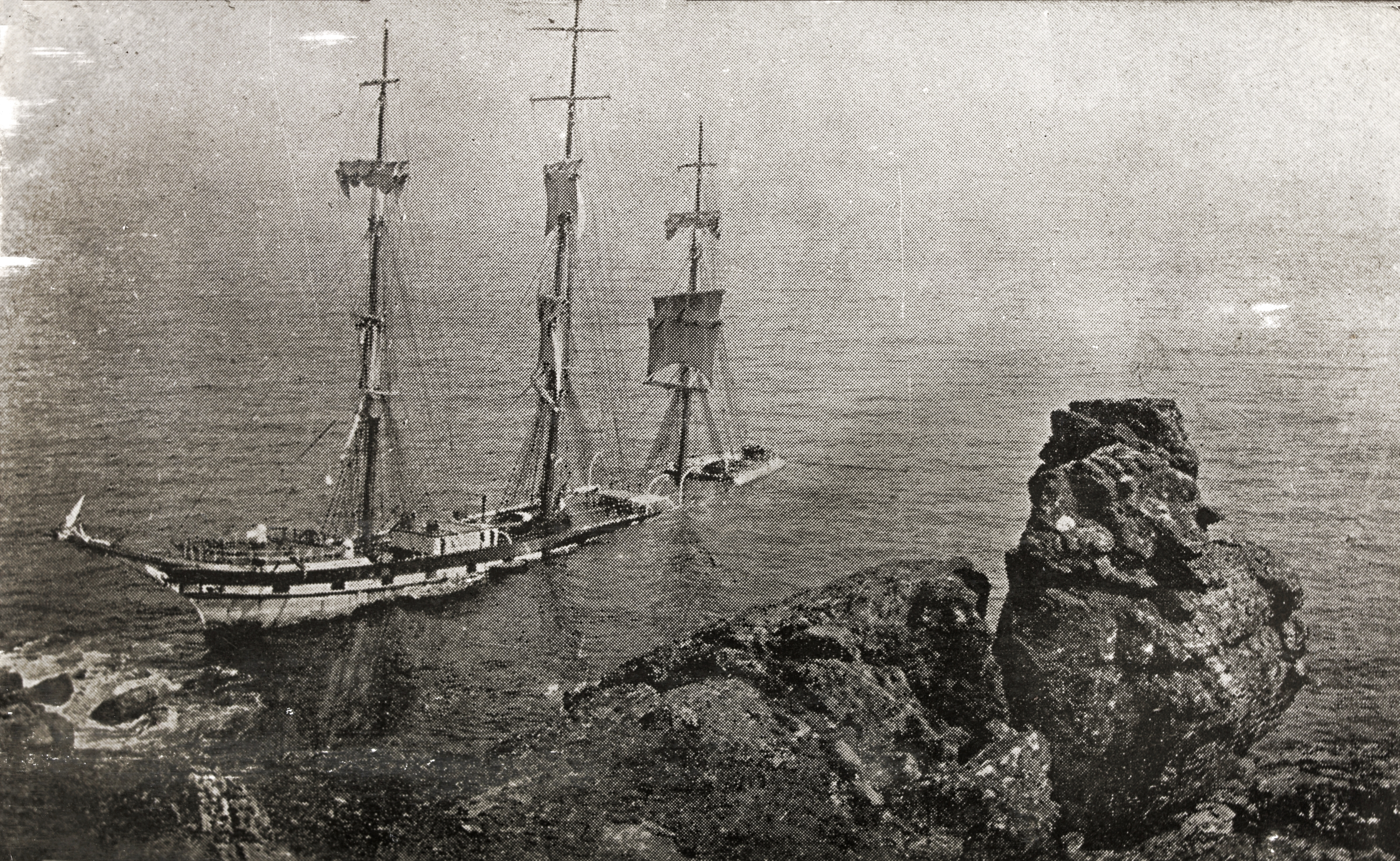
Cromdale shipwreck

- 23 May – 1,903-ton barque Cromdale (United Kingdom) of Aberdeen ran aground at Bass Point, The Lizard in thick fog while carrying nitrates from Taltal, Chile to Fowey. Her crew was saved by the Lizard and Coverack lifeboats ( Royal National Lifeboat Institution). A contemporary report in The Cornishman writes that the first lifeboat on the scene was from Cadgwith shortly followed by the Lizard lifeboat; there was no mention of the Coverack lifeboat. Broke up in SSW gale a week later.
- 14 August – J Duncan (United Kingdom) of Cardiff and bound from her home port to Devonport with coal was stranded at Tol Pedn and abandoned by her crew.
- 29 November – the 1276 tons steamer Ville du Temple (France) in ballast from Nantes to Cardiff struck the Runnelstone in thick fog. She drifted north, with a damaged hull, and her crew abandoned in the ship's boat about a mile NNW of the Brisons when they sighted the Mercutio of Penzance. She finally drifted ashore at Porthmoina Cove, Zennor.

=== 1914 ===
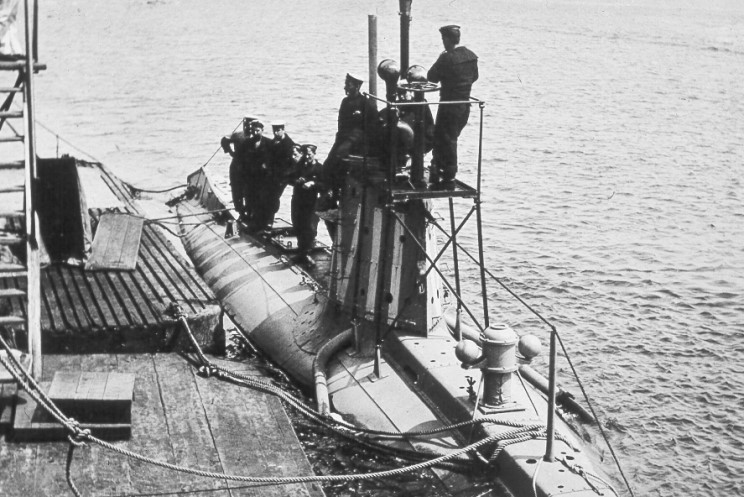
HMS A7

- 18 January – A class submarine HMS A7 (Royal Navy) sank in Whitsand Bay, off Rame Head, while carrying out practice torpedo attacks with the loss of 11 lives.
- 1 February – four–masted barquentine Hera (Germany) struck the Whelps reef and sunk on the west side of Gull Rock, off Nare Head in severe weather with five rescued and nineteen lost. She was on voyage from ″Chili″ to Falmouth with nitrates. The mass grave at Veryan is the longest grave in Britain.
- 15 March – barque Trifolium (Sweden) at Whitesand Bay, Sennen; six crewmen saved, five were drowned.

== First World War ==
=== 1914 ===
- December – the 3,100-ton Cape Horner Asnieres (France) ran aground under Castle Point, St Mawes while entering Falmouth harbour without a pilot. She was refloated the following month and returned to service.

=== 1915 ===
- 16 April – the 72-ton steam drifter the Pearl (United Kingdom) was stranded at 09:00 in fog off Penzance promenade while trying to enter Newlyn harbour. She refloated at 16:30.
- 18 May – Drumcree (United Kingdom) was torpedoed and sunk by U-27, (commander: Bernd Wegener) (Imperial German Navy), 11 miles NE of Trevose Head. She was in ballast from Barry to Port Arthur, Texas.
- 19 May – Dumfries (United Kingdom) was torpedoed and sunk by the German submarine U-27, (Imperial German Navy), 13 miles north of Trevose Head. She was carrying coal from Cardiff to Livorno with the loss of two lives
- 2 July – Boudougnat (Belgium) was torpedoed and sunk by U-39 (Imperial German Navy) south of Lizard Point.
- 18 August – steamer Magda (Norway) carrying coal from Port Talbot to Nantes torpedoed by U-27 (Imperial German Navy), 8 miles off Trevose Head.

=== 1916 ===
July

- 18 July – 3,000-ton Glasgow steamer Neto grounded at Gurnard's Head while carrying hay and fodder to Cherbourg.
- 20 July – 3,818-ton collier Enrico Parodi sank off The Carracks while being towed to St Ives by the Lady of the Isles. She ran aground off Gurnard's Head in dense fog and was re-floated by a salvage team working on Neto, which was wrecked two days previous. She was heading to Messina from Cardiff with coal.

October

- 13 October – Henrietta wrecked on Loe Bar.

December

- 1 December – sailing ship Indiana (France) en route from Cardiff to La Rochelle with coal sunk by UB-18, (commander: Claus Lafrenz Imperial German Navy). Report says she sank off St Ives, map shows north of Trevose Head.
- 1 December – schooner Saint Joseph (France) sunk 15 miles NW of Trevose Head by UB-18 (Imperial German Navy) while en route from Cardiff to Bordeaux with 245 tons of coal.
- 2 December – Skjoldulf (Norway) sunk by UB-18 in the vicinity of the Wolf Rock (three locations reported) while carrying coal for Marans from Cardiff.

Unknown date

- ketch Arethusa (United Kingdom) was abandoned by her crew who were picked up by the Padstow lifeboat Edmund Harvey ( Royal National Lifeboat Institution) and assisted by the tug Helen Peele. She drifted and went ashore at Northcott Mouth one mile north of Bude.
- ketch Acacia (United Kingdom) wrecked at Northcott Mouth
- schooner Lelia (France) sunk, off Land's End, at approximately 50 01 00N 05 40 00W by a German submarine.

=== 1917 ===
January

- 2 January – Gallier (United Kingdom) torpedoed and sunk by U-95 (Imperial German Navy) 7 nautical miles (13 km) east northeast of the Wolf Rock.
- 30 January – sailing smack Merit (United Kingdom) shelled and sunk by U-55, commander: Wilhelm Werne (Imperial German Navy) 20 NE of Trevose Head with no loss of life.
- 31 January – Dundee (Canada) torpedoed by U-55, (Imperial German Navy) ten miles NW of St Ives Head with the loss of one life. She was en route from London for Swansea.
- 31 January – sailing ship Saint Leon (France) sunk by U-55, (Imperial German Navy) 12 miles NNW of Pendeen Light.

February

- 1 February – smack Ada (United Kingdom) torpedoed by the submarine U-55 (Imperial German Navy) NNW of Trevose Head.
- 1 February – Essonite (United Kingdom) torpedoed by the submarine U-55 (Imperial German Navy) 3 miles NNW of Trevose Head with the loss of ten lives. She was carrying stone from Caernarvon to Rochester.
- 1 February – fishing smack Inverlyon (United Kingdom) sunk by gunfire from the submarine U-55 (Imperial German Navy) 15 miles NW from Trevose Head
- 6 February – Saxon Briton (United Kingdom) torpedoed by U-55, (Imperial German Navy) three miles NNE of Gurnards Head while carrying petrol from Portishead to Calais with the loss of two lives.
- 8 February – St Ives fishing vessel Mary Ann (United Kingdom) sunk by charges/explosives from the submarine UC-65 commander: Otto Steinbrinck (Imperial German Navy) 18 miles NNE of St Ives Head according to the text and circa 30 miles north of Pentire Point according to the map. Her crew of seven, set adrift in the jollyboat, were picked up by the SS Sheerness.
- 8 February – sailing ship Guillaume Tell (France) sunk by UC-65 (Imperial German Navy) ten miles west of Trevose Head.
- 12 February – collier Aghios Spyridon (Greece) torpedoed and sunk 5 nautical miles (9.3 km) off Pendeen Lighthouse by UC-47, commander: Paul Hundius (Imperial German Navy) while carrying coal from Swansea to Naples.
- 12 February – Lowestoft fishing vessel Brissons (United Kingdom) was scuttled by UC-47, (Imperial German Navy) 9 miles west of Trevose Head.
- 13 February – Lowestoft fishing smack Fleurette (United Kingdom) was captured by UC-47, (Imperial German Navy) and her crew allowed to take to the lifeboat in stormy weather. UC–47 attempted to sink Fleurette without success and she ran aground near Navax Point. The five crew were not found.

March

- 10 March – schooner Marie (France) sunk by UC-62, commander: Ernst Hashagen (Imperial German Navy) 15 miles North of the Seven Stones.
- 11 March – fishing vessel Thrift was shelled and sunk by UC-62, (Imperial German Navy) 15 miles west of Trevose Head.
- 11 March – fishing vessel Charles Le Cour was torpedoed by UC-47, (Imperial German Navy) 7 miles NNE of Pendeen Watch with no loss of life. She was on voyage from Cardiff to Nantes with coal.
- 12 March – fishing vessel C. A. S. was sunk by UC-47, commander (Imperial German Navy) 12 miles NNW of Trevose Head with no casualties.
- 12 March – fishing vessel Ena was sunk by UC-47, (Imperial German Navy) 10 miles NW of Trevose Head.
- 12 March – fishing vessel Hyacinth was sunk by UC-47, (Imperial German Navy) 15 miles NW of Trevose Head.
- 12 March – fishing smack Internos was sunk by UC-47, (Imperial German Navy) 12 miles NW of Trevose Head.
- 12 March – fishing vessel Rivina was sunk by UC-47, (Imperial German Navy) 15 miles NNW of Trevose Head.
- 12 March – fishing vessel Lent Lilly was sunk by UC-47, (Imperial German Navy) 13 miles NNW of Trevose Head.
- 12 March – fishing vessel Jessamine was sunk by UC-47, (Imperial German Navy) 14 miles NNW of Trevose Head.
- 12 March – fishing vessel Gracia was sunk by UC-47, (Imperial German Navy) 12 miles NNW of Trevose Head with no casualties.
- 12 March – fishing smack Nellie (LT–356) scuttled by UC-47, (Imperial German Navy) 13 miles NW of Trevose Head. No casualties.
- 12 March – fishing vessel Proverb (LT–356) sunk by UC-47, (Imperial German Navy) 25 miles NW of Trevose Head with no casualties.
- 30 March – the crew of cargo ship Glenco (United Kingdom) abandoned ship when she developed a leak north of Trevose Head.

April

- 12 April – collier Diligent (United Kingdom) sank NW of Bude Haven after a collision. She was en route from Santander to Troon.
- 19 April – Polyktor (Greece) of Ithaca with a cargo of coal went ashore near Pendeen. She refloated the next day and sank.
- 19 April – navy trawler Star Of Freedom (United Kingdom) hit a mine laid by UC-47, commander: Paul Hundius (Imperial German Navy) off Trevose Head with the loss of ten lives.
- 24 April – while in ballast from Rouen to Barry Roads, Plutus (United Kingdom) was sunk by UC-47, (Imperial German Navy) 9 miles NNW of Trevose Head with the loss of one life.
- 25 April – P&O liner Ballarat (United Kingdom) torpedoed by UB-32 (Imperial German Navy), taken in tow but sank the next day 8.5 nautical miles (15.7 km) off The Lizard. She was carrying 1600 troops, and a cargo of antimony and copper ore, gold bullion, and general cargo. There were no deaths.

May

- 1 May – fishing vessel Raymond Ester (France) sunk by UC-48, commander: Kurt Ramien (Imperial German Navy) ten miles NW of Pendeen Watch.
- 2 May – cargo ship Warnow (United Kingdom) torpedoed by UC-48 (Imperial German Navy) six miles west of Trevose Head with the loss of 14 lives.
- 2 May – fishing smack United (United Kingdom) captured and sunk by explosives by UC-48 (Imperial German Navy) five miles NW of Godrevy.
- 6 May – barque President (France) sunk by gunfire from UC-75, commander: Johannes Lohs (Imperial German Navy) 12 miles west of Trevose Head.
- 18 May – steamship Mary Baird (United Kingdom) sunk by a mine laid by UC-47 (Imperial German Navy) 2.5 miles NW of Pendeen Watch with the loss of seven lives. She was in ballast Rouen to Newport.

June

- 3 June – steamship Portofino (Italy) torpedoed by UC-47, commander: Herbert Pustkuchen (Imperial German Navy) three miles NE of Pendeen Watch.

==== August ====
- 9 August – steamer Jeanne France) sank in a collision with Echo 16 miles SW of Trevose Head while on passage with coal from Swansea to Nantes.
- 14 August – Wisbech (United Kingdom) torpedoed by UC-51, commander: Hans Galster (Imperial German Navy) 12 miles NE of Trevose Head while en route from Cardiff to St Malo with patent fuel and steel tyres.
- 14 August – Verberckmoes (France) torpedoed by UC-51 (Imperial German Navy) off Trevose Head with the loss of four lives. She was carrying coal from Swansea to Dunkerquie.
- 23 August – Veghtstroom (United Kingdom) carrying a cargo of coal from Penarth to Le Havre was torpedoed by UC-47 (Imperial German Navy) seven miles NW of Godrevy lighthouse with the loss of five lives.
- 23 August – Peer Gynt (Norway) torpedoed by UC-47 (Imperial German Navy) 8 to 9 miles NE of Godrevy lighthouse with the loss of four lives. She was carrying coal from Port Talbot to Rouen.

September

- 10 September – sailing ship Mary Orr (United Kingdom) captured by UC-51 (Imperial German Navy) and sunk by explosives eight miles NE of Pendeen Watch.
- 10 September – schooner Moss Rose (United Kingdom) sunk by gunfire from UC-51 (Imperial German Navy) seven miles NNE of Pendeen Watch while en route from Ellesmere Port to Cherbourg with coal.
- 10 September – schooner Mary Seymour (United Kingdom) sunk by gunfire from UC-51 (Imperial German Navy) seven miles NNE of Pendeen Watch while en route from Ellesmere Port to Cherbourg with coal.
- 10 September – schooner Water Lily (United Kingdom) captured and scuttled by UC-51 (Imperial German Navy) eight miles NE of Pendeen Watch while en route from Runcorn to Cherbourg with coal.
- 10 September – brigantine Jane Williamson (United Kingdom) sunk by gunfire from UC-51 (Imperial German Navy) while 20 miles NNE or St Ives. One of the lifeboats was also shelled and four of the six crew of Jane Williamson were killed.
- 11 September – Dublin schooner William (United Kingdom) on voyage from Cardiff to St Brieuc with a cargo of coal was sunk by the submarine UC-51 (Imperial German Navy) 4 miles NW by N of Crackington Haven. The crew were fired on but only there was only one casualty from shrapnel.
- 11 September – UC-51 (Imperial German Navy) captured and sunk the fishing vessel Rosy Cross (United Kingdom) 4 miles NW by W of Crackington Haven.
- 23 September – Rosehill (United Kingdom) torpedoed by UB-40 (Imperial German Navy) off Fowey and sank while under tow in Whitsand Bay 50°19.793′N 4°18.520′W.

October

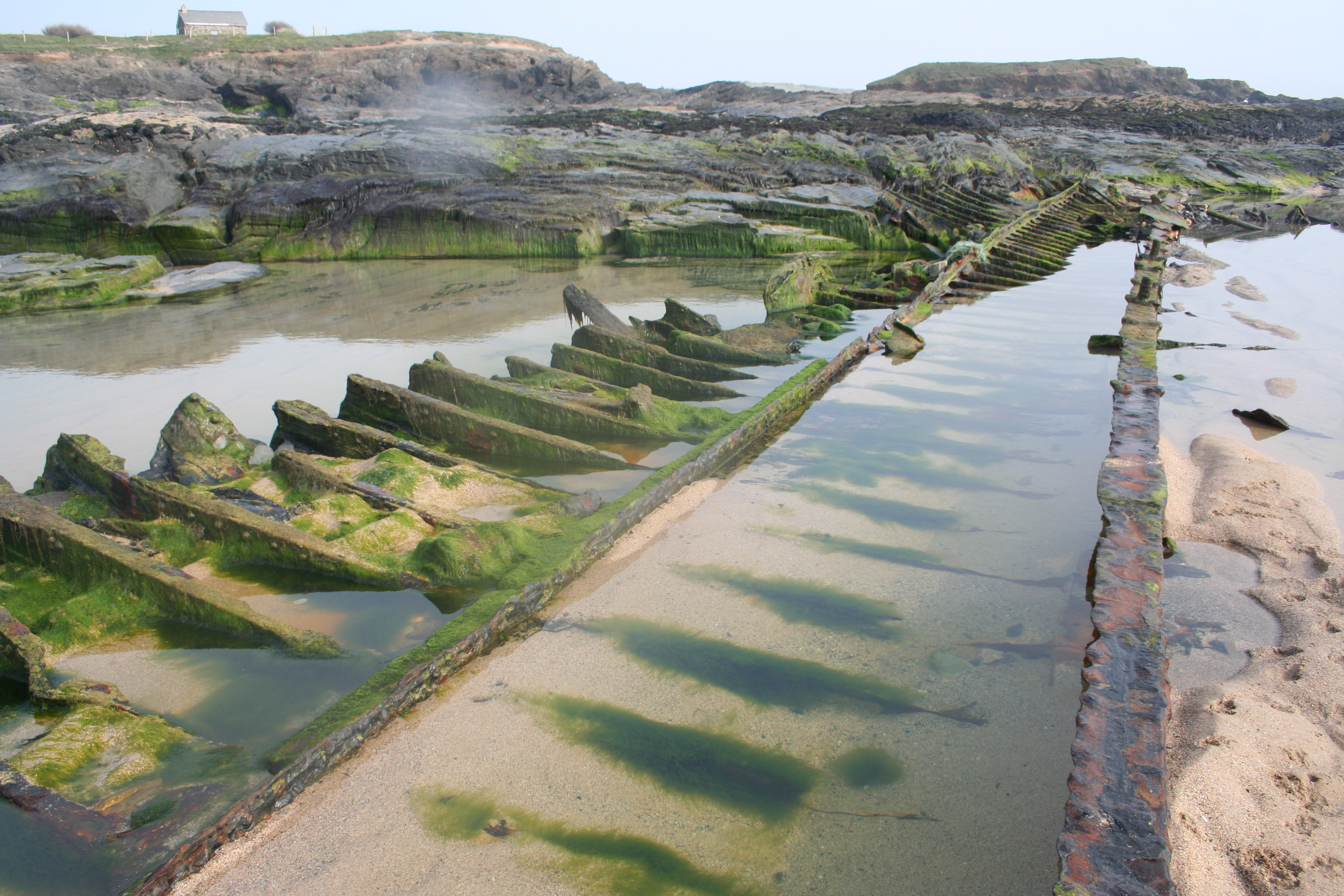
The wreck of the SV Carl

- 9 October – Poldown (United Kingdom) sunk by a mine laid by UC-51 (Imperial German Navy) while carrying coal from Penarth to Boulogne. Eighteen people lost.
- 10 October – three masted sailing ship Carl (Imperial German Navy) was beached and abandoned in Constantine Bay while being towed to London during a storm. The wreck is visible at Booby's Bay.

November

- 27 November – Almond Branch (United Kingdom) torpedoed and sunk by U-57, commander: Carl–Siegfried Ritter von Georg (Imperial German Navy) 2 nautical miles (3.7 km) south east of Dodman Point with the loss of one crew member.
- 29 November – sailing ship Pierre sunk by U-57 (Imperial German Navy) north of Trevose Head.

December

- December – while helping the SS Osten (Denmark) of Copenhagen which had lost her funnel and part of her superstructure the Newquay lifeboat James Stevens No 5 ( Royal National Lifeboat Institution) capsized and was lost. Her thirteen crew were saved.
- 30 December – Zone torpedoed and sunk by U-110 off the north coast of Cornwall.

Unknown date

- Bellucia drifted in the English Channel after being torpedoed by a German U-boat and sank east of Church Cove off the Lizard. She was carrying flour and wheat.
- Belem wrecked at Northcott Mouth, near Bude.
- Saint Chamond (United Kingdom) torpedoed and sunk by U-60 (Imperial German Navy) off Clodgy Point, St Ives.
- Joshua Nicholson torpedoed by U-70 (Imperial German Navy). She was taken in tow but broke loose and hit Lee Ore, part of the Runnel Stone reef.

=== 1918 ===
- 7 January – The Type U 93 submarine SM U-95 (Imperial German Navy) was originally thought to have been lost in the English Channel off Hardelot, Pas-de-Calais, France after 15 January with the loss of all 36 crew. Following the examination of the propellers of a wreck off the Lizard Peninsula, divers found that it is this vessel and not SM U-93 (Imperial German Navy).
- 14 January – HMHS Rewa sunk by torpedoes from U-55 (Imperial German Navy, commander: Wilhelm Werner) 33 miles north of Newquay in the Bristol Channel.
- 31 January – while in ballast from Devonport to Barry Roads Towneley (United Kingdom) torpedoed by U-46, commander: Leo Hillebrand (Imperial German Navy) 18 miles NE of Trevose Head. Six lives lost including the master.
- 1 February – Cavallo (United Kingdom) torpedoed by U-46 (Imperial German Navy) while on a voyage from Swansea to Odda with a cargo of tinplate and coal. She sank with the loss of three lives six miles NW of Trevose Head.
- 6 February – trawler FV Holkar (United Kingdom) was sunk by gunfire from U-53, commander Hans Rose (Imperial German Navy) 8 miles north of Trevose Head.
- 6 February – sailing ship and fishing vessel Marsouin (France) sank when she came under gunfire from U-53 (Imperial German Navy) in Bude Bay. Scheduled Ancient Monument no. 906491
- 7 February – Beaumaris (United Kingdom) was torpedoed two miles north–by–west of the Longships, while being piloted by the Sennen Cove lifeboat Ann Newbon ( Royal National Lifeboat Institution). She headed for shore and grounded with no loss of life.
- 7 March – sailing ship Saint Georges (France) sunk by gunfire from U-55 (Imperial German Navy, commander: Wilhelm Werner) 2 miles north of Trevose Head.
- 7 March – while in ballast from Fecamp to Swansea barquentine Saint Joseph (France) sunk by gunfire from U-55 (Imperial German Navy) 5 miles NW of Trevose Head.
- 10 March – Germaine (France) carrying coal from Swansea to Rouen was torpedoed by U-110 (Imperial German Navy, commander: Karl Kroll) 2 miles NNW of Pentire Head.
- 15 March – Shad Thames (United Kingdom) sank after a collision with Hortense (Norway) off the north Cornish coast 11 miles SW of Hartland Point while en route from Rouen to Swansea in ballast.
- 18 March – sailing ship Brise sunk by gunfire from U-55 (Imperial German Navy) 3.5 miles north of Trevose Head while on voyage from Paimpol to Cardiff with pitprops.
- 18 April – Runswick (United Kingdom) torpedoed by U-109, commander: Kurt Ramien (Imperial German Navy) three miles north of Trevose Head. She was out of Newport carrying coal.
- 18 April – Dalegarth Force (United Kingdom) torpedoed by U-86 and U-73 (Imperial German Navy) 12 miles SW from Hartland Point with the loss of five lives.
- 18 April – Gregynog (United Kingdom) torpedoed by U-86 (Imperial German Navy) 16 miles SW from Hartland Point with the loss of five lives.
- 28 April – Rimfakse (Norway) torpedoed by U-60, commander: Franz Grunert (Imperial German Navy) ten miles SW of Hartland Point while carrying iron ore from Bilbao to Cardiff.
- 2 May – Girdleness (United Kingdom) was torpedoed by U-60 (Imperial German Navy) 18 miles NE by E from Trevose Head with the loss of two lives. She was carrying patent fuel.
- 2 May – 1700 ton Norlands (Norway) of Tonsberg bound for Rouen from Swansea with coal hit the Outer Stone off Godrevy during an ESE gale. The 17 crew escaped in the ship's boat and was picked up by the St Ives lifeboat James Steven No 10 ( Royal National Lifeboat Institution).
- 4 May – Polbrae (United Kingdom) was sunk by U-60 (Imperial German Navy) 1.25 miles southwest of Sharpnose Point while bound for St Malo from Cardiff with a cargo of patent fuel. Two lives lost.
- 8 May – Dux (United Kingdom) was torpedoed by U-54 (Imperial German Navy, commander: (Hellmuth von Ruckteschell) seven miles NW of Godrevy Lighthouse while en route from Swansea to La Rochelle with a cargo of coal.
- 25 May – Saphir (Norway) while carrying coal from Barry Dock to Bayonne was torpedoed by U-94 (Imperial German Navy, commander: Martin Schwab) 1.5 miles NNW of Trevose Head.
- 28 May – while in ballast from Sables d'Olonne to Swansea, sailing ship Flora (France) sunk by U-101, commander: Carl–Siegfried Ritter von Georg (Imperial German Navy) 2 miles north of Tintagel.
- 6 June – cargo ship SS Brisk (Norway) torpedoed by U-82 (Imperial German Navy) 13 miles NE of Trevose Head while en route from Cardiff to Rouen with coal.
- 14 July – sailing ship Maria Jose (Portugal) sunk by UB-65, commander: Martin Schelle (Imperial German Navy) 20 miles north of Trevose Head.
- 14 July or after – UB-65 (Imperial German Navy) has been identified as the wreck 10 miles NNW of Padstow by its propeller markings. The loss is unexplained and all 37 crew were lost.
- 23 July – Anna Sofie (United Kingdom) was torpedoed by U-55 (Imperial German Navy) with the loss of 1 life. She was en route from Rouen to Barry Roads in ballast.
- 17 August – cargo ship Denebola (United Kingdom) was torpedoed and sank in the Celtic Sea, 2 nautical miles (3.7 km) north west of Gurnard's Head, Cornwall (50°13′N 5°37′W) by SM UB-86 (Imperial German Navy) with the loss of two of her crew.
- 3 September – while in convoy from Bordeaux to Cardiff with timber, the Brava (Portugal) was sunk by a torpedo from U-125, commander: Kpt Werner Vater (Imperial German Navy) 3.5 miles NW of Trevose Head.
- 3 September – Lake Owens (United States) torpedoed by U-125 (Imperial German Navy) 3 miles WNW of Trevose Head with the loss of five lives. She was in ballast en route from Nantes to Barry Roads.
- 6 September – Milly (United Kingdom) torpedoed by UB-87 (Imperial German Navy), commander: Karl Petri while in ballast and en route to Barry from Brest two and a quarter miles west of Tintagel Head with the loss of two lives.
- 16 September – the armed cargo vessel SS Madryn (United Kingdom) was torpedoed by U-82 (Imperial German Navy) while en route from Penarth to Devonport with coal.
- 5 November – the armed cargo vessel Lake Harris (United States) beached at Penzance railway station after a gunfight off Land's End with a surfaced German submarine. While refloated and towed to Falmouth for repairs; an Admiralty tug Epic (United Kingdom) went on to the rocks, for two days. A second tug Blazer (United Kingdom) was later wrecked on the Isles of Scilly
- 6 November – cargo ship SS Bogstad (Norway) sunk by a mine off Bude Haven

== 1919–1939 ==
=== 1919 ===
- 17 March – Falmouth Castle (United Kingdom) of Falmouth hit the Lee Ore Reef between the Runnelstone and Tol Pedn and was beached in Porthcurno Bay.
- 29 April – Frisia (Netherlands) of Rotterdam foundered half a mile north–west of Aire Point while heading to Rouen from Carfiff with coal. Her crew took to the ship's boat and were picked up by the Sennen lifeboat Ann Newbon ( Royal National Lifeboat Institution).
- 30 November – one of three Royal Navy Armed Motor Launches under the escort of a destroyer on passage from Queenstown to Southampton suffered from a disabled engine in heavy seas off Land's End. HM ML No 378 (Royal Navy) towing hawsers parted on two occasions and she drifted towards the Longships. Her crew of nine took to a dinghy which capsized and four of five were picked up by the Sennen lifeboat Ann Newbon ( Royal National Lifeboat Institution). Four other crew made it to the Longships and also rescued by the lifeboat.

=== 1920 ===
- January (or early February) – tug Arwenack (United Kingdom) was found ashore three miles north of Bude. Scheduled Ancient Monument no. 907688.
- 18 January – SS Skjoldborg (Norway) of Haugesund sank off the Lizard.
- March – several vessels ran aground in thick fog including the Lowestoft steam trawler Golden Gift (United Kingdom) which ran aground on the Larrigan Rocks, Penzance. Refloated on the next tide.
- 26 April – schooner Belmont (United Kingdom) ran aground on the approaches to Padstow.
- 15 August – 2000 ton steamship Lake Grafton of Chicago hit the Lee Ore, part of the Runnel Stone reef and sank. She was carrying coal from Swansea to Copenhagen and her crew of 38 was picked up by SS Dunmore.
- 30 August (or 23 August) – the cargo vessel Hickleton hit a rock near Gurnard's Head, Zennor, and was then driven ashore. The following day she floated off the shore and sank 50 yards from the shore and sank in 13 m. All thirteen crew abandoned ship and survived.
- 22 September – motor fishing boat Our Boys of Porthleven drifted into the Longships and her crew managed to scramble on to the rocks and were taken off by the Sennen lifeboat Ann Newbon ( Royal National Lifeboat Institution). Our Boy was late salvaged.
- 12 November – the steam trawler Anémone (France) ran ashore 50 yards east of Porthleven harbour. She was towed into the harbour and repaired. According to Carter (1998) she was wrecked in January.
- 19 November – the steamer Groningen (Netherlands) with a cargo of coal grounded while entering the outer harbour at Porthleven despite the harbour being closed because of the heavy seas. Refloated on the incoming tide and headed for Newlyn.
- 2 December – Ansgir went ashore at Penzer Point near Mousehole.
- RFA Moorview hit the Runnelstone.

=== 1921 ===
- 23 August – the ex Naval patrol vessel ML498 (United Kingdom) was stranded on rocks at Gurnard's Head and went to pieces within a week
- November – the steamship Yannakis (Greek: Γιαννάκης) (Greece) travelling in ballast from Rouen to Fowey and stranded on the eastern side of Praa Sands. Driven further ashore by successive gales, she was refloated in January 1922 by The Lady of the Isles and Greencastle of the Little Western Salvage Company. (see also 1922)
- 4 November – Député Gaston Dumesnil (France): The cargo ship departed Penarth, Glamorgan, United Kingdom for Rouen, Seine-Maritime. She later foundered in the Bristol Channel. The bodies of six of her crew washed up on the north coast of Cornwall.

=== 1922 ===
- 3 March – French trawler, the Marguerite was wrecked at Talland Bay. Two private boats performed a dramatic rescue and all 21 people were saved. The remains of the ship's boiler can still be clearly seen on the beach at low tide.
- 17 March – the cargo ship Yannakis (Greece) ran aground at Praa Sands. She was later refloated. (see also 1921)
- 21 May – 1968 ton tanker St Patrice (United Kingdom) of Swansea stranded on the Mulvin Ledges, Lizard Point in thick fog. Her crew of 23 were saved by the Pinney. She sank in the North Sea while being towed to Germany for repairs.

=== 1923 ===
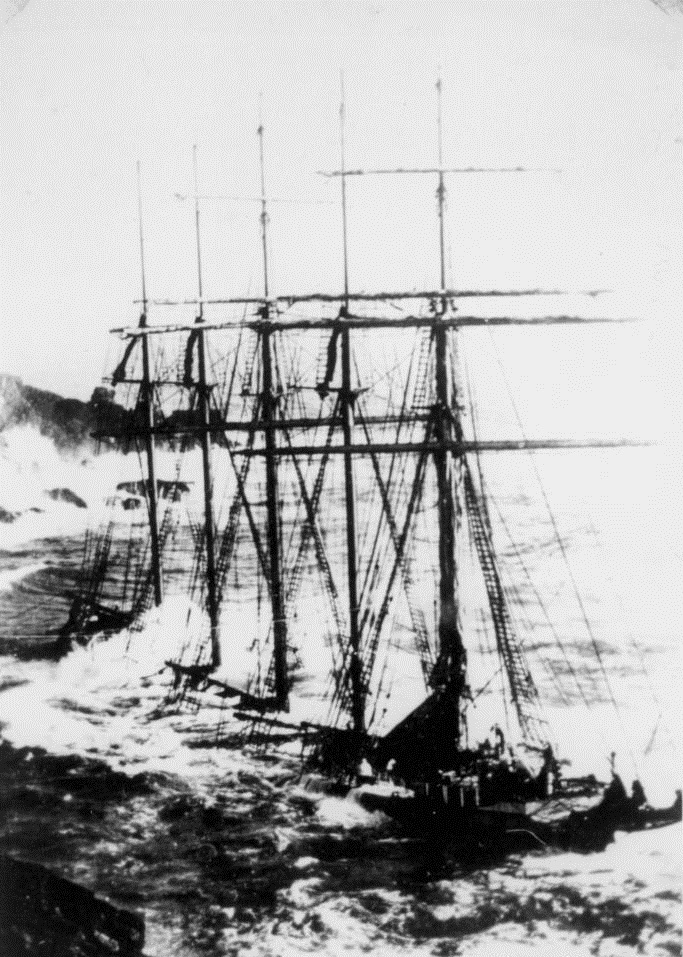
Adolf Vinnen

- 23 February – the 1529 ton barquentine Adolf Vinnen (Germany) was wrecked at Green Lane Cove, Bass Point, in a severe gale while carrying insufficient ballast and on her maiden voyage. All her crew were saved by breeches–buoy. Many forks and spoons were washed up and used for many years.
- June – 993 ton steamer Nivelle (United Kingdom) of London steamed into Pentreath, near Kynance Cove in thick fog. Her crew was taken off by the Pilley and her cargo of coal was salvaged and carried up the cliff by the locals.
- 29 September – steamer Gutfield (Germany) of Hamburg bound for Cardiff from London ran aground near Cape Cornwall. She was refloated and steamed to Falmouth for repairs.
- 8 October – the 6,000 ton City of Westminster (United Kingdom) bound from Belfast to Rotterdam with a cargo of South African maize knocked the top of the Runnelstone reef clean off. A total of 48 people were taken off by the Sennen and Penlee lifeboats and a further 25 in the ship's boat were towed to Newlyn by the steam drifter Pioneer. Today the remains lie in 30 metres of water, jammed into a gully on the eastern side of the stone.

=== 1924 ===
- August – Cardiff collier River Ely (United Kingdom) grounded on Mousehole Island. Later towed to Penzance by the Greencastle (United Kingdom), a salvage ship belonging to the Western Marine Salvage Company.
- 31 August – White Star liner Bardic (United Kingdom) of Liverpool was wrecked on Maenheere, Lizard, near where her sister ship the Suevic went ashore in 1907. Her crew of 93 were brought ashore in the Lizard lifeboat (Royal National Lifeboat Institution) and 44 returned to keep the refrigerators running and her cargo of rabbits, frozen. On 8 September with increasing winds the lifeboat took the crew ashore and her refrigerators stopped working. Bardic was towed to Falmouth and her cargo of rotting rabbits was dumped down a mineshaft near St Day!

=== 1925 ===
- 28 February – steamer Villasandino (Spain) was abandoned in the Atlantic Ocean off Land's End, and her crew were rescued by the tanker British Chancellor (United Kingdom). She ran aground near Compass Point, Bude when her tow parted.

=== 1926 ===
- 17 March – steamer Fagerness sank off Trevose Head after she was run down by steamer Cornish Coast.
- 20 March – schooner Ada of Barrow carrying coal from Barry to Truro struck rocks near Cape Cornwall and refloated on the rising tide. With a member of the Sennen Cove lifeboat crew ( Royal National Lifeboat Institution) acting as a pilot she safely got away from the shore.

=== 1928 ===
- October – schooner S F Pearce (United Kingdom) spent a few hours under Trewavas Head, Mount's Bay in a southerly gale. The crew managed to get the engine going and clear of the rocks

=== 1929 ===
- 17 April – freighter Archangelos ( (Greece) ) wrecked on Dolor Point.
- 30 June – steamship Ixia (United Kingdom) of North Shields bound for Constantinople from Swansea with coal went ashore near Cape Cornwall. All the crew survived.
- 5 December – the 1200 ton collier Ornais II (France) driven ashore at Perranuthnoe in hurricane-force winds. She was on her way from Le Havre to Port Talbot to pick up coal.
- 5 December – the King Harry Ferry was rammed by a coal elevator and sank at her moorings. Later refloated and repaired

=== 1930 ===
- 29 March – Submarine HMS L1 (Royal Navy) wrecked at Cape Cornwall.

=== 1931 ===
- September – Lyminge (United Kingdom) ran aground on Ebal Rocks off Gurnard's Head. The crew and passengers rowed ashore, the ship's cat was rescued later.
- 3 November – the schooner Sainte Annen (France) went ashore while attempting to enter Porthleven harbour, for repairs, while on a voyage from Port Talbot to Vannes with coal. All six crew were saved by the local rocket brigade.

=== 1932 ===
- unknown date – Glamorgan Coast (United Kingdom) on voyage from Bristol to Penzance grounded in fog near Cape Cornwall. The fourteen crew and one passenger rowed ashore to safety.
- October – schooner Sarah Evans (United Kingdom) near Porthtowan, the three crewmen were rescued

=== 1934 ===
- 15 July – Brixham fishing ketch Replete (United Kingdom) caught fire while trawling off the Wolf Rock lighthouse. Crew picked up by the Brixham smack Radiance which was fishing nearby.

=== 1935 ===
- 25 January – SS Merena went ashore on the east side of the sandbank inside Anjove Point at Hayle with a cargo of coal and refloated on the evening tide.
- January – 53 ton Bideford ketch Cicelia (United Kingdom) broke her moorings in St Ives harbour and collided with numerous vessels. Broke up on Pednolva Rocks. She had delivered coal from Lydney and was waiting for the weather to improve.
- 24 February – Archmor (United Kingdom) bound from Cardiff went aground on a sandbank at her destination port, Par. She was carrying 2000 tons of coal.
- 27 March – trawler Le Vieux Tigre (France) stranded on the rocks at Beast Point, The Lizard. The crew of eighteen were taken off by the Lizard Lifeboat, the Duke of York ( Royal National Lifeboat Institution).
- 20 June – D. L. Harper (United States): The tanker ran aground on the Crane Ledges at Lizard Head in fog. Her crew of 43 and a baby were landed at Polpeor by the Duke of York ( Royal National Lifeboat Institution) All 38 crew were rescued the next day by the Penzance Lifeboat.
- 26 September – Clan Malcolm (United Kingdom) of Glasgow: the cargo ship ran aground at Hot Point, near Lizard Point with a cargo of maize. Her fittings were sold by auction on Cadgwith beach and she was considered a danger to shipping and blown up and sunk.
- 21 October – P.L.A. No.6 (United Kingdom) the dredger foundered in the Bristol Channel off Pendeen.
- 30 November – coaster Orchis (United Kingdom) foundered in the Bristol Channel 5 nautical miles (9.3 km) off Pencarrow Head. The crew were rescued by a fishing vessel.
- 25 December – schooner Loustic (France) of Libourne ran ashore on rocks east of Gyllyngvase Beach, Falmouth. Bound from Quimper for Cardiff to collect coal, her crew lowered a ladder and walked up the beach. She broke up a few days later.

=== 1936 ===
- 27 January – Taycraig (United Kingdom) of London hit the Gear Rock, off Penzance promenade while heading to Newlyn to pick up roadstone. All nine crew saved. Broke up and sank three days later.
- February – ketch Kate ran aground at Padstow and became a total loss.
- 10 February – the crew of four (and dog) of the ketch Albatos (France) of Brest were picked up in Whitesand Bay by the Sennen Cove lifeboat Newbons ( Royal National Lifeboat Institution).
- 1 November – SS Bessemer City (United States) wrecked at Clodgy Point, St. Ives. All crew rescued, cargo salvaged by local people after washing up on beaches and said to have fed them for months.

=== 1937 ===
- 11 January – trawler Vierge Marie (Belgium) of Ostend wrecked under Tregiffian Cliffs in thick fog while heading for Newlyn from the fishing grounds. Two men were saved by the rocket apparatus and the Penlee Lifeboat ( Royal National Lifeboat Institution) picked up three men although one died later.
- 16 March – HMS Torrid (Royal Navy): The R-class destroyer ran aground at Flushing, Cornwall while under tow to the breakers. Declared unsalvageable, the wreck was scrapped in situ in 1940.
- 1 July – steamer sail ship Aida Lauro (Italy) on voyage from Liverpool to Hull went aground on Castle Rocks near Cape Cornwall in dense fog. All seventeen crew saved by the St Ives lifeboat ( Royal National Lifeboat Institution).

=== 1938 ===
- 31 January – Alba (Panama): Ran aground at Porthmeor Beach near St Ives. All 23 crew rescued after a wait of seven minutes while they packed their suitcases, but five later drowned when the lifeboat Caroline Parsons ( Royal National Lifeboat Institution) capsized. The remaining men were saved by the Life Saving Apparatus (LSA) crew and bystanders.
- 18 December – Bretonne sheltered in Whitesand Bay from a south–easterly gale while bound from Cardiff to Brest with a cargo of coal. The crew were taken off by the Sennen Cove lifeboat Newbons ( Royal National Lifeboat Institution) and the schooner was not seen again.

=== 1939 ===
- 2 January – HMS Medea (Royal Navy): The M15-class Monitor (warship) parted her tow and was driven ashore at Trebetherick Point, near Padstow with the loss of one of her four crew.
- 21 or 24 January – Wilston (United Kingdom) ran aground at Wicca Pool, Zennor. All crew lost. The unnamed steamer mentioned below may be this ship
- 23 January – St Ives lifeboat John and Sara Eliza Stych ( Royal National Lifeboat Institution) launched to go to the aid of the Wilston (United Kingdom) off Cape Cornwall. She capsized three times off Clodgy Point, The Island and Godrevy Point. Only one member of her eight crew survived.
- 30 January – Julie (United Kingdom): The sailing ship was abandoned in a sinking condition 15 nautical miles (28 km) south south east of the Eddystone Lighthouse. The crew were rescued by the trawler Roger Robert (Belgium). Reported on 7 February at 35°25′N 31°44′W

==== Unknown date ====
- Ruban (United Kingdom): The collier ran aground on The Lizard, Cornwall and was wrecked.

== Second World War ==
=== 1939 ===
- 10 December – collier Stanwood ( (United Kingdom) Stanhope Steamship Co) was scuttled in the shallows of Carrick Roads when her cargo of coal caught fire. She slid down the slope and attempts to refloat her were unsuccessful although her cargo was recovered.

=== 1940 ===
- 20 January – Coroni River ( (United Kingdom) Houlder Brothers & Co Ltd), London struck by a mine laid by U-34 and sank off Falmouth.
- 30 January – Keramiai ( (Greece) Lykiardopoulo shipping line), part of Convoy OA 80G, torpedoed and sunk by U-55 (Kriegsmarine) off Lands End (48°37′N 7°46′W)
- 31 May – Polycarp (United Kingdom) torpedoed off west Cornwall.
- 1 July – ocean liner Avelona Star ( (United Kingdom) Blue Star Line) torpedoed by the German submarine U-43 on 30 June, sank the next day.
- 10 July – tanker British Chancellor: was bombed by Luftwaffe aircraft and sank in Falmouth harbour.
- 10 July – steamer Marie Chandris, carrying a cargo of raw cotton was set on fire during a bombing raid. She was towed to a small bay near St Mawes and sunk by gunfire. She was later re-floated and beached at Place where some of her cargo was salvaged, and she was cut up for scrap.
- 10 July – cargo ship Tascalusa (United Kingdom) was bombed by Luftwaffe aircraft and sank in Falmouth harbour. She was refloated on 29 August and beached at St Just but declared a constructive total loss and her superstructure was cut and towed to Freeman's yard, Penryn in November.
- 3 October – former Isles of Scilly ferry the Lady of the Isles (Royal Navy), requisitioned by the Admiralty as an Auxiliary vessel and sunk by a mine off Killigerran Head near Falmouth, together with the tug Aid. Six ships in as many weeks were sunk off Falmouth by mines.
- 24 November – Belgian trawler Simone Marguerite (Belgium) sunk by gunfire while fishing in Mount's Bay. Her crew were picked up by another trawler Roger Denise (Belgium).
- 25 November – a small convoy of two steamers and a tanker from Plymouth attacked by German destroyers in Mount's Bay. Tanker Apollonia (Netherlands) sunk by the Karl Galster (Kriegsmarine). Fourteen crew killed and 20 survivors. Steamer Stadion 11 (United Kingdom) left afloat, when the German destroyers left, but not seen again.
- 25 November – lifeboats from Sennen, Penlee and the Lizard searched for survivors of a naval and air battle ten miles off the Wolf Rock lighthouse, but nothing found apart from a large patch of oil.
- 26 November – patrol boat Medoc (Marine Nationale) torpedoed and sank off Rame Head with the loss of forty-one crew.
- 28 November – HMS Javelin (Royal Navy) was badly damaged during a sea battle about 15 miles (24 km) south–east of Lizard Point. Under artillery fire and hit by torpedo she lost her bow and stern and was towed back to harbour where she was repaired.
- Unknown date – requisitioned trawler Royalo (Royal Navy) sank at the entrance to Penzance harbour while clearing a string of magnetic mines. Nine survivors.

=== 1941 ===
- 1 February – Kai (United Kingdom) hit a submerged object north of Trevose Head.
- 8 March – steamer Nurgis (Norway) sunk and collier Margo (United Kingdom) heavily damaged by aircraft in Mount's Bay.
- 16 March – steamer Elna E (Norway) struck a mine and sunk 10–12 miles north of Crackington Haven.
- 25 March – Rossmore (United Kingdom) Sunk by bombing 12 nm NE Godrevy.
- 14 April – Arbel (Belgium) of Antwerp bombed and sunk off Cape Cornwall. Of her twenty crew seventeen survived.
- 5 May – Tregor foundered NW of Trevose Head.
- 27 May – Ocean boarding vessel HMS Registan bombed six miles north–west of Sennen Cove by four enemy planes. The crew were picked up by a Sennen Cove fishing boat Ruby.
- 27 May – cargo ship Royksund (Norway) sunk between Trevose Head and Hartland Point after being attacked by a German aircraft. Six men lost.
- 10 July – Svint (Norway) sunk in an air raid seven miles north of Kellan Head.
- cargo vessel Botne (Norway) foundered eight miles WNW of Bude. Scheduled Ancient Monument no 1232497.

=== 1942 ===
- 20 March – steamer Risoy (Norway) carrying 450 ton of scrap iron from Southampton to Swansea sunk in an air raid off Trevose Head with the loss of one crew.

=== 1944 ===
- 5 January – a small convoy (WP457) under escort by the destroyer HMS Mackay (Royal Navy) attacked by German E-boats which were lying in wait under the shelter of land between Porthcurno and the Runnelstone. Escort trawler Wallasea torpedoed, steamer Underwood blown up, steamer Solstadd (Norway) sunk (14 survivors) and the Cornish owned coaster Polperro (Netherlands) went down with all 11 crew killed.
- 6 January – several ships in different convoy, to that mentioned above, sunk by E-boats and crews rescued by the Penlee lifeboat.
- 20 January – HMS Warwick (Royal Navy) sunk by German submarine U-413 (Kriegsmarine) off Trevose Head. Over half of her crew were lost.
- 8 August – convoy (EBC 66) en route from Avonmouth to Falmouth was attacked by German submarine U-667 (Kriegsmarine) off Trevose Head. Freighter Ezra Weston (United States) and corvette HMCS Regina (Royal Canadian Navy) torpedoed. Scheduled Ancient Monument no.1102944

=== 1945 ===
- 21 January – liberty ship George Hawley (United States) torpedoed four miles south–west of the Longships. All but two of the crew saved and the ship was towed to Falmouth.
- 24 February – Sennen Cove lifeboat Newbons ( Royal National Lifeboat Institution) found the wreckage of an unnamed torpedoed ship.
- 15 March – liberty ship James Eagan Layne (United States) torpedoed and sank off Whitsand Bay. Now a popular dive site.
- 21 March – coaster Pacific (Netherlands) on voyage from Maryport to Penryn torpedoed by U-299 (Kriegsmarine). The U-boat herself was sunk by the escort of a nearby convoy with no survivors. This was the last enemy action near Mount's Bay.
- 22 March – steamer Empire Kingsley (United Kingdom) of Greenock torpedoed seven miles north–west of Sennen Cove. All 49 crew transferred to the Sennen Cove lifeboat Newbons ( Royal National Lifeboat Institution).
- 29 March – corvette HMCS Teme (Royal Canadian Navy) was torpedoed four miles north–north–west of Pedn–men–dhu.
- April – German submarine U-325 (Kriegsmarine) sunk off The Lizard in a British minefield (Artizan B3, part 1). She was previously reported to be sunk in the British minefield (HW A1) to the north of Trevose Head with the loss of 52 crew.

== 1945–1965 ==
=== 1946 ===
- 5 February – collier Sphene (United Kingdom) hit the Mouls off Pentire Point
- 16 March – Finisterre (France): Fishing vessel driven ashore at St. Ives. Three crew killed.
- 8 May – while sheltering in Mount's Bay from an easterly gale, the 4765 ton light cruiser Diomede (Royal Navy) drifted onto the Larrigan, rocks and stranded at low tide. Refloated several hours later she continued on her journey from Falmouth to the Clyde for scrapping.
- June – Flowergate (United Kingdom) ran aground on Porthminster Beach, St. Ives while under tow to breakers yard. Later refloated and continued her journey.
- 5 October – while on tow from shore establishment HMS Hornet, S–89 MTB (Royal Navy) was wrecked near Millook Haven and abandoned as a total loss.

=== 1947 ===
- 22 March – schooner Empire Contamar (United Kingdom): Ran aground in St Austell Bay. Seven crew rescued by the Fowey lifeboat ( Royal National Lifeboat Institution). Refloated in June and declared a constructive total loss but rebuilt as a coaster and returned to service.
- 23 April – in storm-force winds, the tug Bustler's hawser parted and the tug Melinda III slipped hers, leaving HMS Warspite (Royal Navy) to run aground while being towed to the breakers yard. She initially beached on the Mount Mopus Ledge near Cudden Point. Later refloating herself, she went hard aground a few yards away in Prussia Cove and was partially scrapped. In 1950 she was towed to, beached and broken up at Marazion.

=== 1948 ===
- 25 June – fishing vessel Energetic (PZ 114) (United Kingdom) was hit by the American steamer Chrysanthystar (United States) in thick fog ten miles SSE of the Lizard. Of the six brothers on board, five were killed. One holidaymaker on a fishing trip was also killed.
- 11 October – fishing vessel Saphir (France) of Camaret sank after colliding with Woodlark eight miles north–west of the Longships. There was one survivor.
- 26 October – the forepart of the steamer Empire Flamingo (United Kingdom) while being towed by the tugs Superman (United Kingdom) of Hull and Airman (United Kingdom) started to sink three miles south of the Longships. Four men rescued by the Sennen Cove lifeboat Susan Ashley ( Royal National Lifeboat Institution). The Empire Flamingo was sunk as a blockship on one of the Normandy beaches in February 1944.
- 1 November – motor tanker Saint Guénolé of Rouen (France) ran aground at Penberth Cove while bound for Irvine from Nantes in ballast. She was found bottom up and eleven of her twelve crew drowned.

=== 1949 ===
- unknown date – cargo ship Empire Flamingo (United Kingdom) scuttled off Gwennap Head.
- unknown date – Northern Lights came ashore on Tavern beach, St Mawes and later re-floated.

=== 1950 ===
- the salvage boat Barnet (United Kingdom) standing guard overnight under the Warspite's bows, at Prussia Cove was holed in the engine room, towed off and eventually drifted ashore at Long Rock, a few miles to the west.
- Steamer Sand Runner United Kingdom ran aground at St. Ives Head while bringing coal from Barry to Hayle. All crew saved and she was refloated the following day.

=== 1952 ===
- 10 January – Flying Enterprise (United States) was a 6,711 ton Type C1-B ship which sank 31 nautical miles (57 km) south of The Lizard. On voyage from Hamburg to New York she suffered structural damage on 25 December 1951 during a storm while in the Western Approaches. She was escorted by American naval ships but finally sank in the English Channel. There was much speculation in the media about her cargo. According to the Coastguard logbook her tow from the Turmoil parted and she foundered and capsized.
- 17 January – steamship Liberty (Liberia) hit the rocks under Pendeen Watch while on voyage from Newport to La Goulette. All the crew was saved and the wreck was salvaged.
- 2 October – minesweeper HMS Wave (Royal Navy) snapped her anchor chain and went aground between St Ives Harbour and Porthminster beach in a 60-mph gale. All the crew were saved by breeches buoy. She was refloated and towed to Devonport.

=== 1954 ===
- 27 July – coaster Traute Sarnow (West Germany) bound from Cardiff to Ostend with coal struck rocks near Gurnard's Head. The crew and dog were saved by breeches buoy.

=== 1956 ===
- 2 January – Citrine (United Kingdom): The collier sank off The Lizard, Cornwall. All ten crew were rescued, but one later died.
- 14 March – trawler Vert Prairial (France) of Dieppe driven ashore at Wireless Point, Porthcurno. All seventeen crew lost.
- 8 July – Yewcroft (United Kingdom): The 827-ton steamship stranded in dense fog on the rocks of Trevean Cove, while carrying cement between Cliffe and Bristol. The captain believed he was near the Brisons at Cape Cornwall.

=== 1957 ===
- unknown date – St. Ives fishing lugger Nazarene (United Kingdom) grounded at Pedn-vounder Beach near Porthcurno in fog while heading for Newlyn with pilchards. The ship was a total loss but the crew climbed the cliffs and walked to the village of Treen with their catch, nets and fishing gear worth over £1000.

=== 1958 ===
- 15 August – fishing vessel Hesperian hit an underwater ledge between Carn Du and Penzer Point, west of Mousehole. Penlee lifeboat W & S ( Royal National Lifeboat Institution) towed her to Newlyn harbour.

=== 1959 ===
- 1 April – crabber Pluie de Rose (France) was wrecked at Trevedran Point, St Loy. The skipper swam ashore to raise the alarm at a farm. Two men were saved by breeches buoy and four men were picked up by the Penlee Lifeboat ( Royal National Lifeboat Institution) in a small boat.

=== 1961 ===
- 13 December – tanker Allegrity (Everard F T & Sons Ltd, United Kingdom) while en route from Le Havre to Stanlow struck Greeb Point to the east of Caerhays Castle and hit the shore at Porthluney Cove below the castle.

=== 1962 ===
- 3 November – Dieppe trawler Jeanne Gougy (France) wrecked on Dr Syntax's Head, Land's End. The crew were trapped in an air pocket in the wheelhouse for six hours until low tide when they were rescued by the Life Saving Apparatus and Whirlwind Helicopter. Of the crew of eighteen, twelve lost their lives.
- 29 December – 6,000-ton coaster Ardgarry capsized off the Lizard with the loss of all the crew.
- unknown date – 259 ton Dieppe trawler Gai Floreal (France) beached near Zennor Cove. The crew were taken off by breeches buoy and she was towed off the rocks by the St Ives lifeboat.
- unknown date – a motor cruiser Paulina wrecked on rocks near Gartul, Porthleven.

=== 1963 ===
- 13 September – Alacrity bound from Swansea to Belgium with coal ran aground in fog at Portheras Cove, near Pendeen Watch lighthouse. The wreck was later blown apart by explosives in an attempt to break the ship up for scrapping. However, some speculate that the charges were inexpertly placed or too powerful. This led to the ship being spread over most of the beach. Pieces of Alacrity can still be seen, specifically a large piece of hull plating in the stream at the access point to the cove. There is a warning board in place warning visitors of the potential of sharp fragments in the sand.
- 23 October – Juan Ferrer ( Spain) wrecked under Boscawen Point, near Lamorna with the loss of eleven of her fifteen crew. A few days later the Newlyn and Mousehole Fishermen's Association wrote to Trinity House suggesting a light and foghorn at Tater Dhu which was first lit in 1965.

=== 1964 ===
- 24 March – 90-ton trawler Victoire Roger (Belgium) of Ostend caught fire and went ashore at Gamper Cove, Land's End. The Sennen Cove lifeboat Susan Ashley ( Royal National Lifeboat Institution) herself grounded while taking off the five man crew.

== 1966–2000 ==
=== 1966 ===
- April – the small coaster Saba (Netherlands) was aided by the Scillonian (ferry from Penzance to Scilly) after her steel cargo shifted and she sank off Porthgwarra.
- 31 July – the pleasure cruiser Darlwyne, chartered from Greatwood, a then hotel near Restronguet, to take guests on a day trip to Fowey. She set out on the return voyage but was never seen again; all on board, 23 adults & 8 children, perished. An investigation found the captain, Brian Michael Bown, to have acted negligently in ignoring local advice to remain in port; consequently the owner John Campbell Maitland Barrett was required to pay £500 towards the cost of the investigation. Traces of the wreck of the Darlwyne were reportedly found near Dodman Point on 31 July 2016 (exactly 50 years after its disappearance) by divers collaborating with the makers of the BBC's Inside Out South West.

=== 1967 ===
- 18 March – Tanker Torrey Canyon (Liberia) Ran aground on Pollard's Rock on Seven Stones Reef between Lands End and the Isles of Scilly, causing one of the world's largest oil spills.

=== 1969 ===
- 12 May – Tanker Hemsley 1 (United Kingdom) ran aground in thick fog at Fox Cove, near Treyarnon Bay and was close enough to the coast for most of her crew to scramble on to the rocks and up the cliff. She was on her way from Liverpool to a breakers yard in Antwerp. Originally launched as the Scotol, she was renamed to Hemsley 1 on 21 June 1948, and was at the time of her wreck, the oldest registered British steamship. She had originally reported she had foundered at the Lizard after mistaking Trevose Head lighthouse for the Lizard light.

=== 1970 ===
- fishing boat Golden Calf went aground at Mousehole.

=== 1971 ===
- 14 October – barge Ewt 263 (United Kingdom) was being towed from Santander to Rotterdam by the tug Britannia when she broke in half off Lizard Point. The stern section was towed into Falmouth and the bow section was believed to be washed up between Hemmick Beach and Dodman Point.
- 22 December – Romeo ran aground on Hayle Bar.

=== 1972 ===
- 27 January – the cruise ship Queen Frederica (Greece) was driven aground in the Fowey Estuary after breaking free from her moorings in a storm.
- 7 September – the crew of trawler La Varenne (France) of Cherbourg were attempting to abandon ship after she went into a small cove at Land's End. Eight men were picked up by the Sennen Cove lifeboat Susan Ashley ( Royal National Lifeboat Institution).
- 5 November – Nefili steamed into Dollar Cove, Land's End in fog when her radar failed. Crew saved by breeches-buoy. She sits directly on trawler La Varenne.

=== 1973 ===
- 13 December – the fishing vessel Kergall (France) of Guilvinec dragged her anchor while sheltering from a southerly gale and went ashore at Chyandour 100m west of Penzance railway station.

=== 1975 ===
- 25 January – coaster Lovat sank in a WNW gale gusting to hurricane force, 25 miles south of Penzance. All crew were lost.

=== 1977 ===
- 19 February – barge Manifour (United Kingdom) wrecked to the south of Bude Haven
- September – Kerland (France): a trawler sinking off the Runnelstone was aided by the Isles of Scilly ferry RMV Scillonian III
- 14 November – fishing vessel Sea Gay (United Kingdom) developed a leak and sunk 24 miles (39 km) south of Dodman Point
- 16 November – 449 tonne coaster the Union Crystal (United Kingdom) cargo of rock salt shifted causing her to sink 12 miles north of Cape Cornwall. A silver medal was awarded to Coxswain Pengilly of Sennen Cove Lifeboat Diana White ( Royal National Lifeboat Institution).
- 5 December – trawler Boston Sea Ranger (United Kingdom) of Lowestoft foundered off Gwennap Head during a southerly gale. Three survivors were picked up by the Sennen Cove relief Lifeboat Vincent Nesfield ( Royal National Lifeboat Institution)
- 25 December – Lady Camilla (Denmark): The coaster sank off Cornwall, with loss of life including two children.
- 26 December – on her first voyage after a major refit, the Conqueror (United Kingdom) of Grimsby went ashore at Penzer Point, south of Mousehole. It was believed the crew were down below having breakfast and the trawler was on automatic pilot! The Lifeboat Solomon Browne ( Royal National Lifeboat Institution) had insufficient power to tow the Conqueror off the rocks, assumed a 35° list and broke up on the rocks.

=== 1978 ===
- 18 February – catamaran Floral Dancer (United Kingdom) of Falmouth fouled her rudder and propeller and towed into Whitesand Bay by the relief Lifeboat Vincent Nesfield ( Royal National Lifeboat Institution) and beached in the cove without damage.
- 14 June – fishing vessel Deux Socurs (United Kingdom) of Newlyn caught fire and abandoned by her crew of three off the Longships.
- 13 December – fishing vessel MFV Alcyon (France foundered north of Trevose Head
- 30 December – trawler Ben Asdale (United Kingdom) drifted onto Maenporth Beach, Falmouth after fouling her rudder and being driven ashore in a force ten gale. Three lives lost.

=== 1979 ===
- 15 December – cargo ship Skopelos Sky (Greece) ran aground west of Kellan Head, near Port Issac while en route from Garston to Algiers with lubricating oil.

=== 1980 ===
- 4 January – Scottish pair trawler Bounteous sank in Mount's Bay with the loss of three lives.
- 19 March – trawler Normauwil (Belgium) stranded near the north pier of Newlyn harbour and towed clear by the Lifeboat Solomon Browne ( Royal National Lifeboat Institution).
- 13 November – Kristel (United Kingdom) capsized near Padstow
- 26 November – Castor 1 (Panama) capsized while in tow after engine failure near Port Isaac. She was in ballast from Londonderry to Par.

=== 1981 ===
- 19 September – Tungufoss (Iceland) sank south of Gwennap Head. The crew was saved by Lifeboat Diana White ( Royal National Lifeboat Institution) and RNAS Culdrose Sea King helicopter.
- 19 December – Lifeboat Solomon Browne ( Royal National Lifeboat Institution) lost while attempting to rescue the crew of the Union Star (Republic of Ireland) off Tater-du, near Lamorna. Eight crew lost from each vessel.

=== 1982 ===
- 21 May – fishing vessel Northern Star (United Kingdom) caught fire north of Trevose Head.
- 13 December – fishing vessel Lady Catherine went ashore at Carn Dhu near Mousehole.

=== 1984 ===
- 3 January – the St Ives lifeboat Frank Penfold Marshall ( Royal National Lifeboat Institution) rescued fourteen people from the coaster Orca (Netherlands) and tug Fairplay X (West Germany)

=== 1985 ===
- 18 May – fishing vessel Sarah Jane overturned one mile west of the Cowloe Rocks. Her crew of one was rescued by the Lifeboat Diana White ( Royal National Lifeboat Institution).

=== 1988 ===
- 6 February – Gillian Claire foundered on Hayle Bar.
- 8 February – trawler Simone Marguerite (Belgium) ran ashore on the Cressars Rock, Penzance, in a SW gale after steering the wrong side of the pole. Refloated by the Penlee Lifeboat.
- September – trawler New Pioneer ran aground at Merthen Point, St Loy. The Penlee Lifeboat took off her three crew.

=== 1989 ===
- 12 March – MV Secil Japan carrying timber wrecked on the North Cliffs near Godrevy.

=== 1994 ===
- 26 July – fishing vessel Kwester (United Kingdom) sprang a leak while on passage from Falmouth to Fowey and sank between Portholland and Porthluney Cove.
- 24 November – Chrisande (United Kingdom) capsized NW of Bude Haven.

=== 1995 ===
- 30 May – sailing ship Maria Asumpta (United Kingdom) wrecked on Pentire Head with the loss of three lives. She was launched in 1858 from the beach at Badalona, Spain.

=== 1997 ===
11 March – St Ives fishing vessel Gorah Lass (United Kingdom) sank north–east of St Ives. All three crew died.

=== 2000 ===
- Dolfyn wrecked at Mousehole.

== See also ==
- List of shipwrecks of Cornwall
- List of shipwrecks of the Isles of Scilly
- Protection of Wrecks Act 1973
- List of U-boats of Germany
