= Ballarat (disambiguation) =

Ballarat is an urban area in Victoria, Australia.

Ballarat or Ballaarat may also refer to:

== Places ==
- Ballarat, California, a ghost town in Inyo County, California, US
- City of Ballarat, a local government area in Victoria, Australia
- Ballarat Central, a locality within urban Ballarat, Victoria, Australia
- Ballarat Province, a former electorate of the Victorian Legislative Council until 2006
- Division of Ballarat, an Australian electoral division
- Ballarat railway station

== Ships ==
- HMAS Ballarat (J184), a Bathurst-class corvette serving from 1940 to 1947
- HMAS Ballarat (FFH 155), an Anzac-class frigate commissioned in 2004
- P&O Liner Ballarat, in the List of shipwrecks of Cornwall

== Other uses ==
- Ballaarat steam engine, a steam engine built in the Australian city
