= Hemmick Beach =

Beach in South West England

Coordinates: 50°13′45″N 4°48′51″W

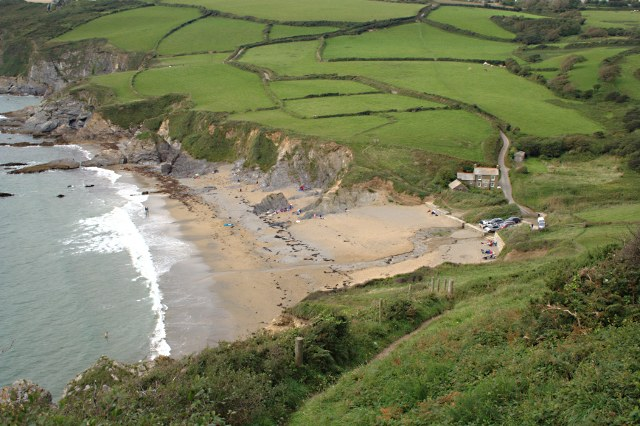
Hemmick Beach

Hemmick Beach is a west-facing beach on the south coast of Cornwall, Britain. It is situated at the east end of Veryan Bay, on the west side of the Dodman Point headland, and to the south of the hamlet of Boswinger and to the west of Penare.

== Description ==
Author David Clegg describes the beach as "small and sandy and just one lovely granite cottage", while the Rough Guide to Britain notes the rocky outcrops, inlets and coves in the vicinity. 0.75 miles (1.21 km) to the east is Lambsoden Cove, accessed via a coastal footpath. There is an estate there with 70 acres of farmland. Nearby is Dead Man Point.

The beach contains the tall grey-flowered plant dittander and reed grass, which typically grows between 8 and 12 feet high.

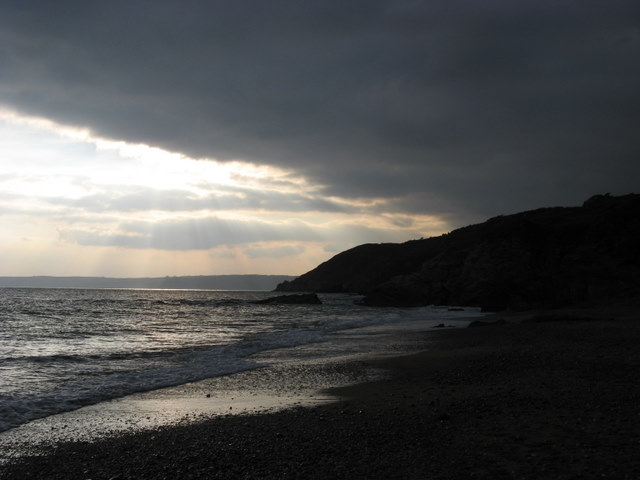

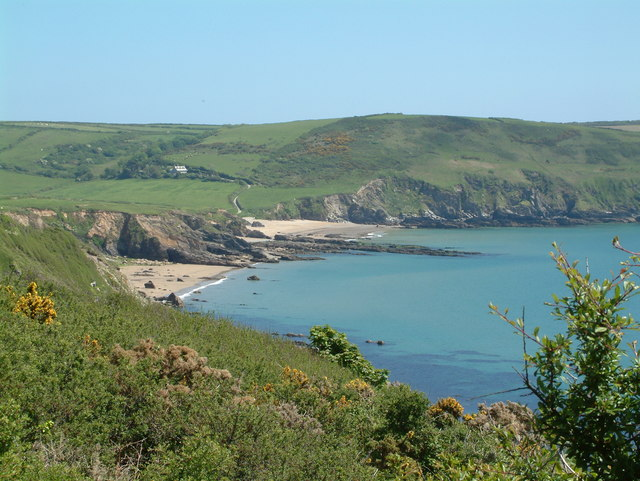

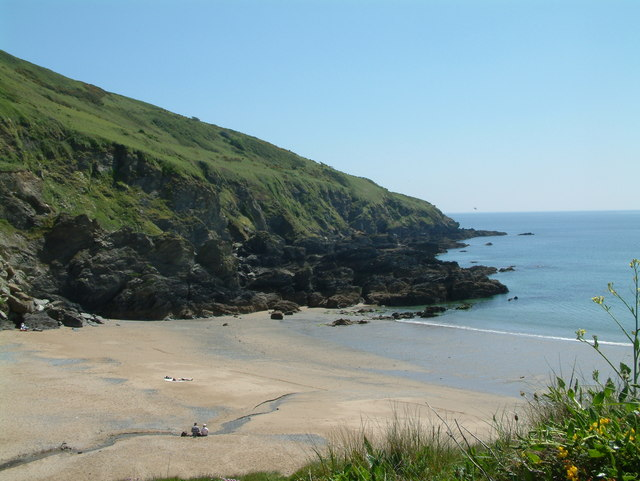

== Shipwreck ==
In 1971, British vessel Ewt 263 was being towed from Santander to Rotterdam by the tug Britannia when she broke in half off Lizard Point. The stern section was towed into Falmouth and the bow section was believed to be washed up between Hemmick beach and Dodman Point.
