= Penare =

Coordinates: 50.2297°N 4.8058°W

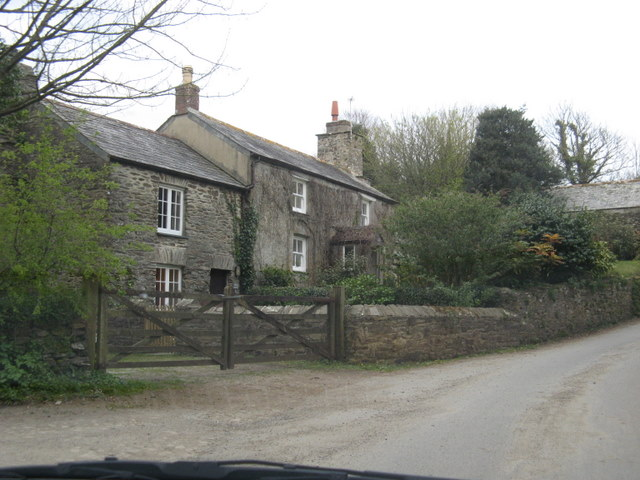
- A house in Penare

- Location within Cornwall
- OS grid reference: SW999403
- Unitary authority: Cornwall
- Ceremonial county: Cornwall
- Region: South West
- Country: England
- Sovereign state: United Kingdom

Penare is a hamlet near Gorran Haven in Cornwall, England, UK. Penare is situated 1 mile (2 km) south-west of Gorran Haven.

Penare lies within the Cornwall Area of Outstanding Natural Beauty (AONB).
