= SS Fairport =

SS Fairport may refer to one of two Type C2-S-E1 ships built by Gulf Shipbuilding for the United States Maritime Commission:

- SS Fairport (1941) (MC hull number 849), sunk by U-161 on 16 July 1942; all hands survived
- SS Fairport (1945) (MC hull number 1614), scrapped in 1970

or may refer to:

- SS Fairport (United Kingdom) of Liverpool dragged her anchor and beached on Porthcurno beach on 28 December 1908; towed off the following day
