= Boswinger =

Coordinates: 50.2361°N 4.8182°W

Boswinger: Cornish: Boswynngor
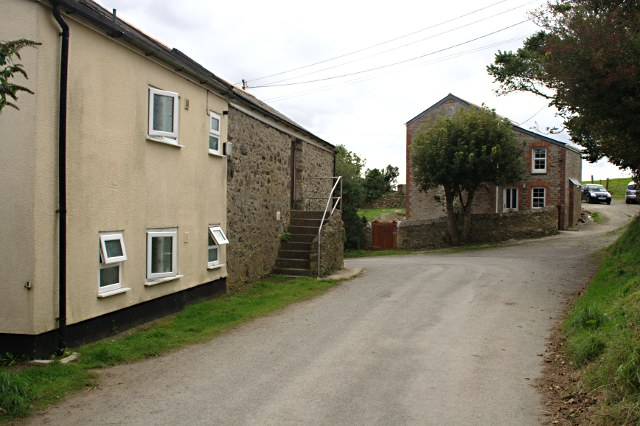

- Location within Cornwall
- OS grid reference: SW9941
- Shire county: Cornwall
- Region: South West
- Country: England
- Sovereign state: United Kingdom
- Post town: St Austell
- Postcode district: PL26
- Police: Devon and Cornwall
- Fire: Cornwall
- Ambulance: South Western

Boswinger (Cornish: Boswynngor) is a village in south Cornwall, England, two miles south of Mevagissey (where the 2011 Census population is included). There is a youth hostel in a former farmhouse.

Boswinger is in the Cornwall Area of Outstanding Natural Beauty (AONB).
