= List of places in Penwith =

Penwith District
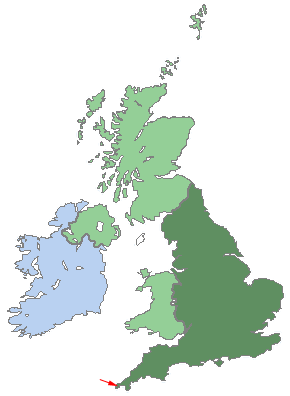
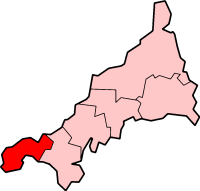
Shown within UK and Cornwall

This is a full list of all the towns, villages, hamlets and other places of note in the Penwith district of Cornwall, England, United Kingdom

== A-D ==
Battery Rocks, Bejouans, Boscaswell, Boscawen-Un, Bosporthennis, Bosvennen, Boswednack, Botallack, Botreah, Brea Cove, Canon's Town, Cape Cornwall, Carbis Bay, Carnyorth, Chenhalls, Church Rock, Penwith, Chypraze, Connor Downs, Cribminjie, Cripps, Crowlas, Crows-an-Wra, Drift

== E-K ==
Economy Cove, Escalls, Folly Cove, Gulval, Gwithian, Gwynver, Hayle, Haldrine Cove, Kerris, Kelynack, Hal Dinas, Jonick

== L-P ==
Lamorna, Lamorna Cove, Lelant, Levant, Long Rock, Ludgvan, Land's End, Lower Ninnes, Madron, Marazion, Morvah, Mousehole, Mount's Bay, Nancledra, Newlyn, Nanjizal, Nanquidno, Nanven

== P ==
Paul, Pendeen, Penzance, Porthcurno, Porthgwarra, Penberth, Pendour Cove, Pennance, Perran Downs, Phillack, Polgassick Cove, Polpry Cove, Porthchapel, Portheras Cove, Porthglaze Cove, Porthgwarra, Porth Kidney Sands, Porth Ledden, Porthmeor, Porthmeor Beach, Progo, Porthminster Beach, Priests Cove, Cape Cornwall, Porthmoina Cove, Porth Nanven, Pedn Vounder, Porthzennor Cove, Porthguarnon, Porthcella, Prye, Polostoc Zawn, Punyans, Pedn-men-an-mere

== Q-S ==
Reawla, River Cove, Rosemergy, Rosewarne, Rosudgeon, Sancreed, Sennen, Sennen Cove, St Buryan, St Erth, St Hilary, St Ives, St Just in Penwith, St Levan, St Loy's Cove, Scathe, Skewjack, Sparnon

== T-Z ==
Teave, Tregarnoe, Trevescan, Tredinnick, Tregeseal, Trendrine, Trenuggo, Treveal, Trewellard, Treen (in St Levan parish), Treen (in Zennor parish), Treen Cove, Tregavarah, Tregerthen, Tregonebris, Treloweth, Veor Cove, Wherrytown, Zennor, Zennor Head.
