= Pridden =

Hamlet in Cornwall, England

Coordinates: 50.082°N 5.614°W

Pridden is a hamlet in west Cornwall, England, United Kingdom.

It is located approximately one mile northeast of St Buryan village on the B3283 road. There is an area of woodland and a farm of the same name.
