= St Buryan's Church =

Coordinates: 50°04′31″N 05°37′22″W

St Buryan's Church, St Buryan
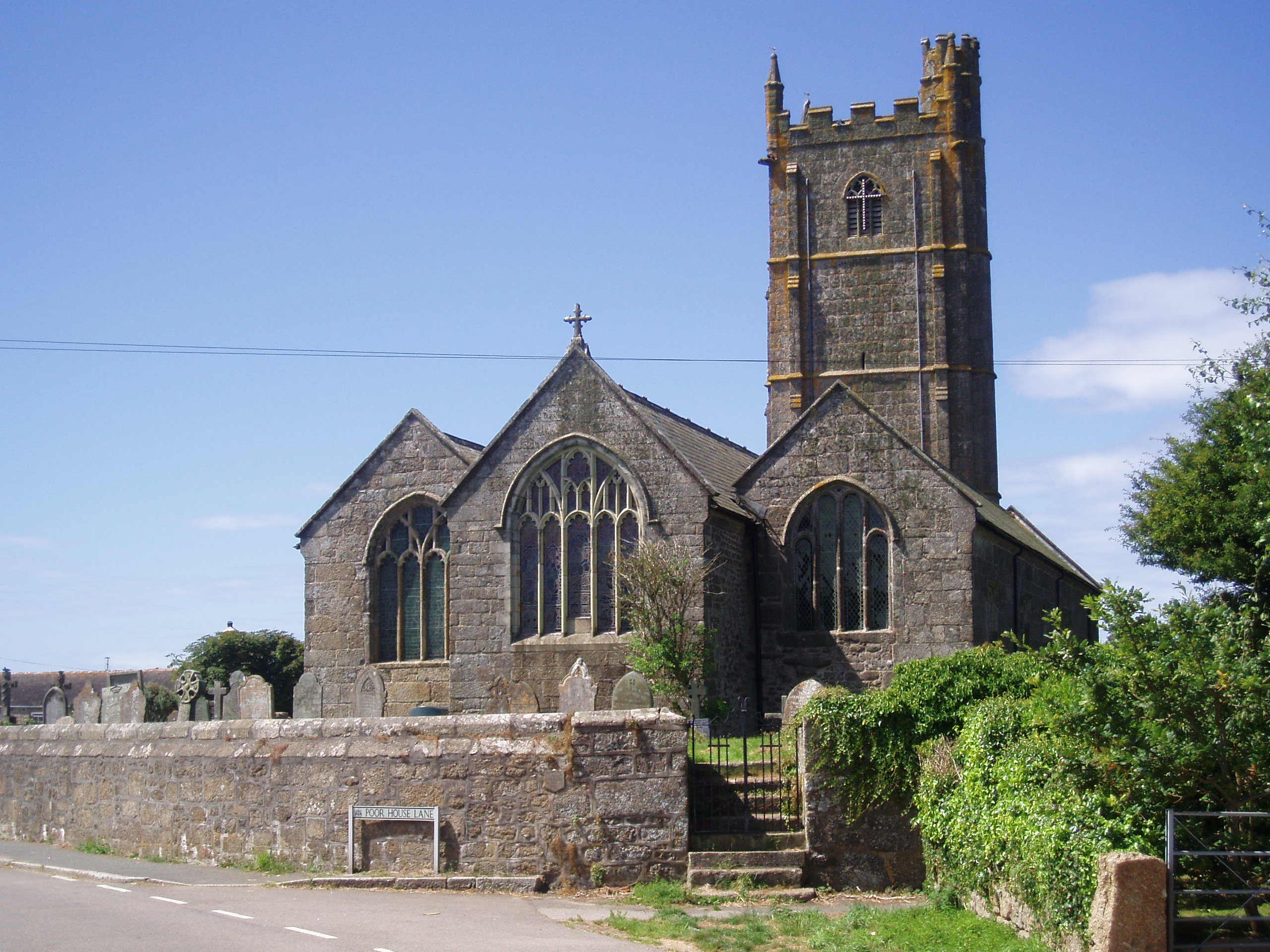
- St Buryan's Church
- St Buryan's Church, St Buryan
- Denomination: Church of England
- Churchmanship: Broad Church
- Website: www.stburyanchurch.org.uk

History
- Dedication: St Buryan

Administration
- Province: Canterbury
- Diocese: Truro
- Parish: St Buryan
- Location within Cornwall

Listed Building – Grade I
- Official name: Church of Saint Buryan
- Designated: 15 December 1988
- Reference no.: 1327526

The Church of St Buryan is a Grade I listed parish church in St Buryan, Cornwall, England. Although a church has occupied the site since at least the early 10th century, the present building dates mainly from the late 15th and early 16th centuries, with surviving fabric from the 12th century. The church is notable for its substantial west tower, late medieval architecture, and its historic status as a Royal Peculiar, which placed it outside normal diocesan control for several centuries. It also contains a renowned peal of bells—the heaviest set of six bells in the world—and a churchyard with early stone crosses and notable burials.

== History ==
A church has occupied this site since the early 10th century. According to tradition, King Athelstan prayed at a chapel dedicated to Saint Buriana around 930 during his campaign in Cornwall and later endowed a collegiate church on the site. Little survives from this early phase, but the church was enlarged and formally dedicated in 1238 by Bishop William Brewer.

By the late 15th century the medieval church had fallen into disrepair, and extensive rebuilding followed. Much of the present fabric dates from the late 15th and early 16th centuries. The prominent west tower was completed in 1501 and stands approximately 92 feet (28 m) high. It is constructed of finely worked granite from nearby Lamorna and is divided into four stages with paired buttresses at each corner. An octagonal stair turret rises from the south-east corner of the tower. is 92 feet (28 m) high and constructed of wrought-cut granite from nearby Lamorna.

Further alterations took place in later centuries. The north wall was rebuilt in the 18th century, at which time a small lean-to chapel on the north side of the chancel was removed. In 1814 the interior fittings were renewed, including the replacement of benches and the screen. A major Victorian restoration followed, and the church was reopened in 1875 by Frederick Temple, then Bishop of Exeter, who also consecrated the new churchyard.

In 1956 a Lady Chapel was added as a memorial gift from John Franklin Tonkin in memory of his uncle, Robert Edmund Tonkin of Treverven. The church was designated as a Grade I listed building in 1988.

== Royal peculiar ==
Under the terms of its early endowment, the parish of St Buryan functioned for centuries as a Royal Peculiar, meaning it was subject directly to the English Crown rather than to the local diocesan bishop. This status was highly unusual and placed the parish outside normal ecclesiastical jurisdiction.

Throughout the Middle Ages, the arrangement led to prolonged disputes between the Crown and the bishops of Exeter, who claimed authority over the parish but were unable to exercise regular oversight. As a result, the parish often lacked consistent episcopal administration, a factor that contributed to the deteriorating condition of the church by the late 15th century.

Following the English Civil War, the peculiar jurisdiction was annexed to the Diocese of Exeter in 1663. Although the parish briefly experienced further jurisdictional uncertainty later in the 17th century, it was ultimately brought fully under diocesan control. Today, the church lies within the Diocese of Truro and serves the surrounding parishes of St Buryan, St Levan, and Sennen.

== Architecture ==
The Church of St Buryan was mainly built in the 15th century, with some work possibly extending into the early 16th century. Parts of the north wall of the chancel survive from the 12th century, representing the earliest visible fabric of the church. Although restored in the 19th century, the building retains a strong medieval character.

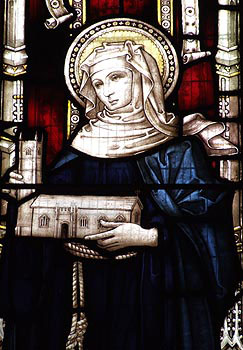
Stained glass, St Buriana

The church is constructed of granite ashlar and granite rubble, with dressed elvan stone incorporated into the early chancel wall. It has Delabole slate roofs with granite coped gables. The layout consists of a nave and chancel under a single roof, with north and south aisles, a south porch, and a prominent west tower. Most of the arcades and roof structures date from the late medieval rebuilding.

Externally, the church is largely unaltered and retains its late medieval appearance, with Perpendicular-style windows and four-centred arched doorways. The west tower rises in four stages and includes an embattled parapet, corner pinnacles, and an octagonal stair turret.

The stained glass is mainly of late-19th-and early-20th-century date and is designed in the Perpendicular style. The chancel east window was installed in 1872, and further windows dated 1897, 1910, and 1920 commemorate parish clergy and local families, including Charles Dacres Bevan, Revd Thomas Coulson, the Permewan family, and Revd Uriah and Revd John Tonkin.

Inside the church, the nave and chancel arcades have six bays with moulded piers and four-centred arches. Original wagon roofs survive throughout the building. Historic fittings include a late medieval font, fragments of a medieval rood screen reassembled in the early 20th century, and a small number of medieval bench ends, along with later memorials. The earliest surviving feature is a stone pillar on the north side of the sanctuary, which may indicate the former presence of an aisle or adjoining chapel.

The church contains a pipe organ built by Heard and Sons in 1895. Details of the instrument are recorded in the National Pipe Organ Register.

== Church bells ==
The west tower contains a peal of six bells, which together form the heaviest peal of six bells in the world. The peal includes the world’s third-heaviest treble bell and a particularly large tenor bell, making the bells of St Buryan notable beyond the parish. Although the tower was originally intended to house eight bells, the peal developed gradually over time. Major restorations were carried out in the early 20th century and again between 1990 and 2001, after which the bells were rehung and returned to regular use.

Bell Specifications
	weight	dia.	note	founder	inscription
	(cwts, qtrs, lbs)	(inches)			
Treble	9-1-11	36	A#	2001 Whitechapel	I Ring Out Gods Love And Lead The Mighty Five And Rest With Solomon By My Side
2	8-1-0	38	G#	1681 R Pennington	Mr Richard Davis Sampson Hutchins Wardens
3	13-2-10	43	F#	1992 Whitechapel	Vocem ego do vobis date verba deo (I give my voice to you: give ye your words to God). Donated by Venn Bros Ltd (Cornwall) In memory of Eva Venn
4	13-3-1	45	E#	1901 J Warner	Virginis egregiae vocor campana Mariae (I am called the bell of Mary the Glorious virgin)
5	20-2-2	50	D#	1901 J Warner	Richard James Martyn Rector This bell was given to commemorate the Accession of King Edward VII AD 1901 by James Hawke Dennis, Benefactor to St Buryan Church
Tenor	37-2-9	59	C#	1994 Whitechapel	ST SOLOMON Calcar sit quo deus laudetur vox mea (Let my voice be the spur with which to praise God). PRAY FOR US: Christopher J Venn (Tower Captain and Restorer); Joan Thomas; Revd Dr R Legg; B S Cheek; Christine Jago; K Gilbert; Helen Gilbert; J Ellis; Sarah Veal. In Fond Memory of T W Trevor Hitchens 30.12.24 - 23.12.92. Part cost of this bell was met by T Neil & Jane M Hitchens

== Churchyard ==
The churchyard, primarily circular in shape, contains several historic stone crosses associated with St Buryan parish. The site was originally a Romano-British settlement enclosure. By the late 19th century, twelve crosses were recorded in the parish, one of which stands within the churchyard itself. In 1879, concerns were publicly raised about damage to the village cross platform, which stood outside the churchyard gate and had been used as the site of a midsummer bonfire, leaving the stonework scorched.

The churchyard is also the burial place of Augustus Smith (1804–1872), the first Lord Proprietor of the Isles of Scilly.

== Gallery ==
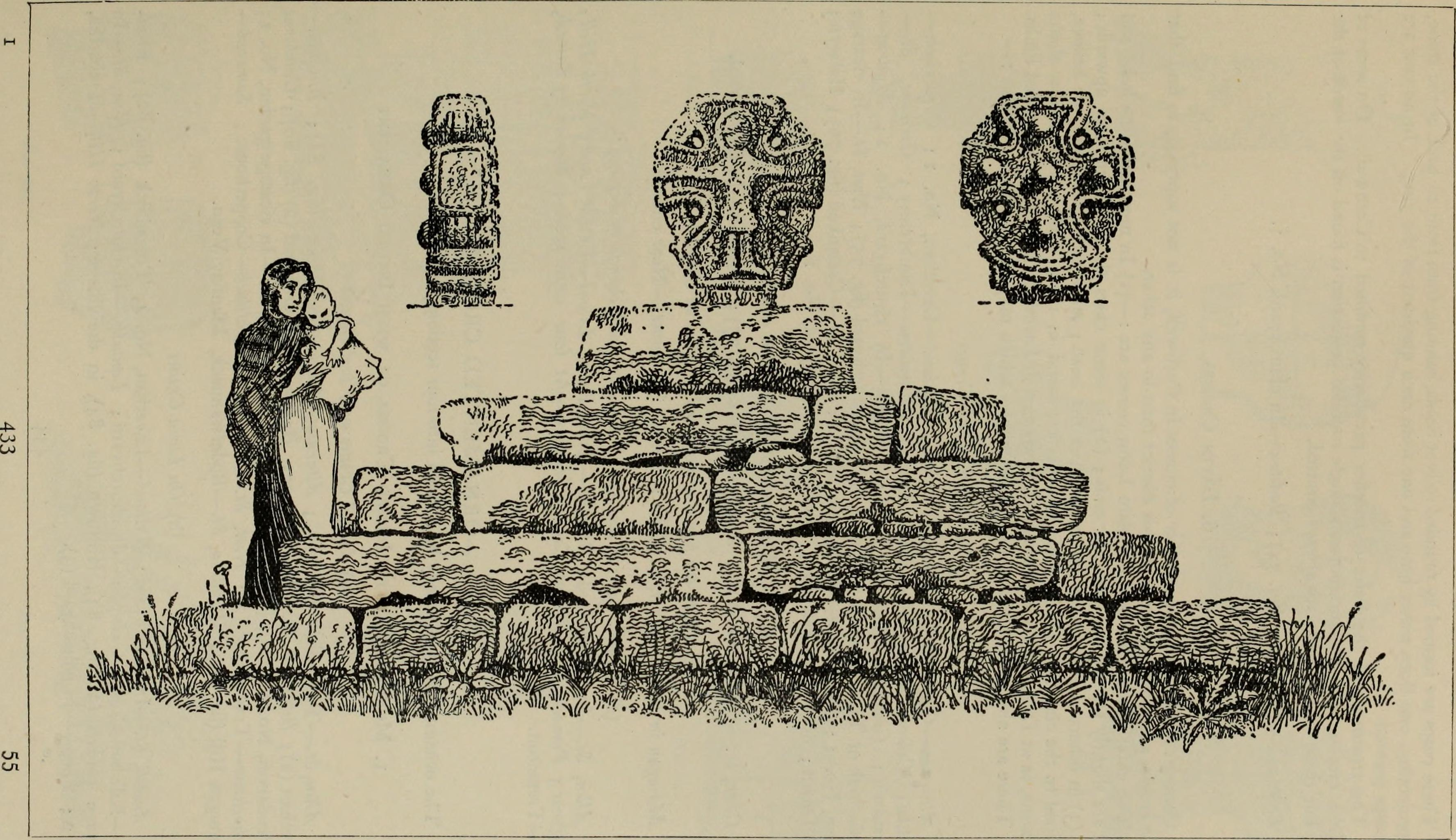
1906 drawing of churchyard cross

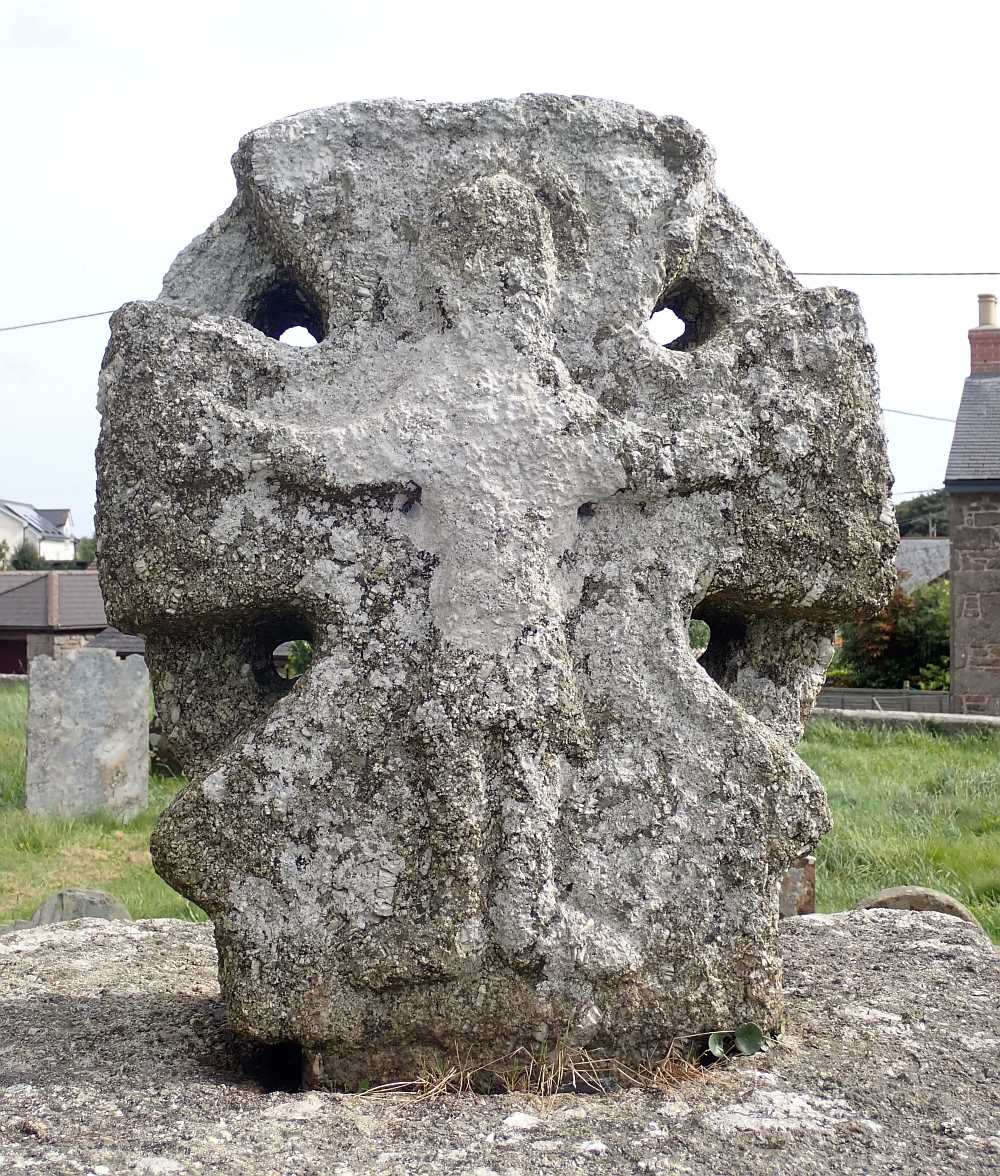
Cross-head, west face

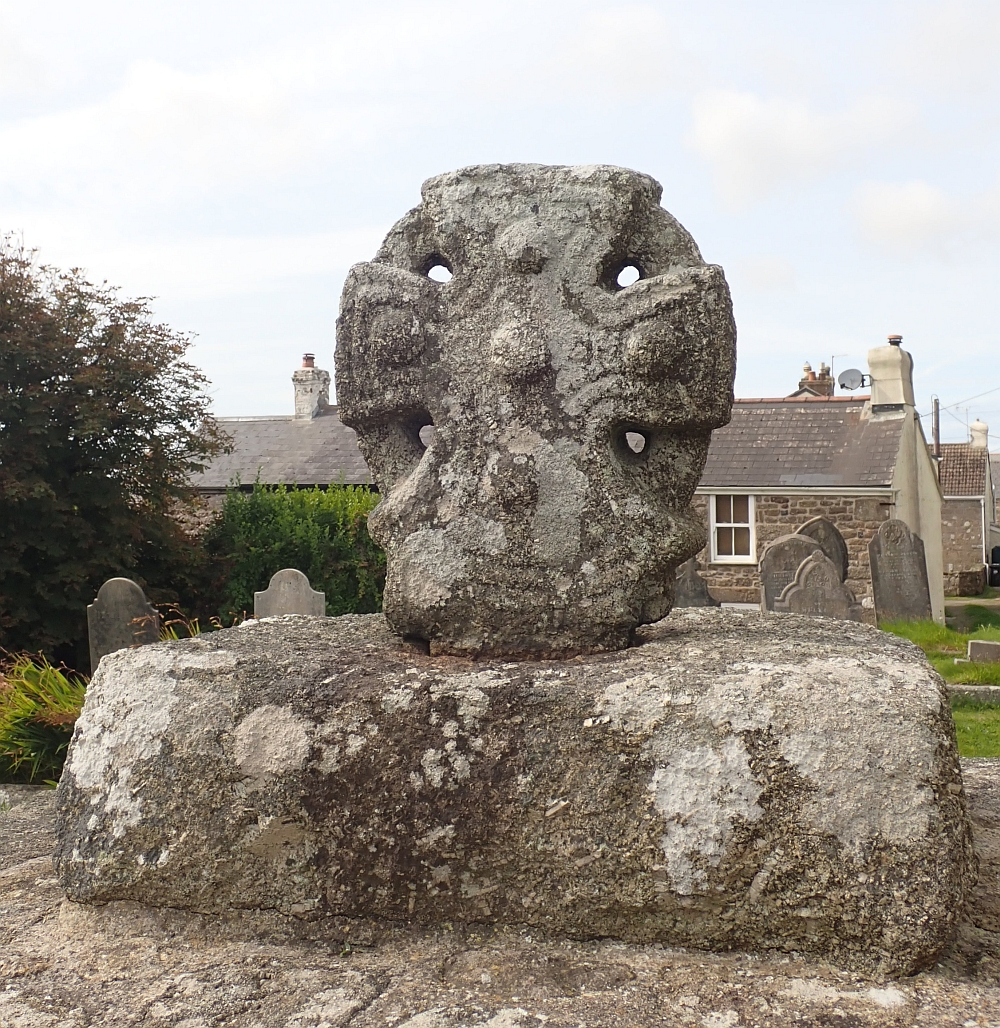
Cross-head, east face

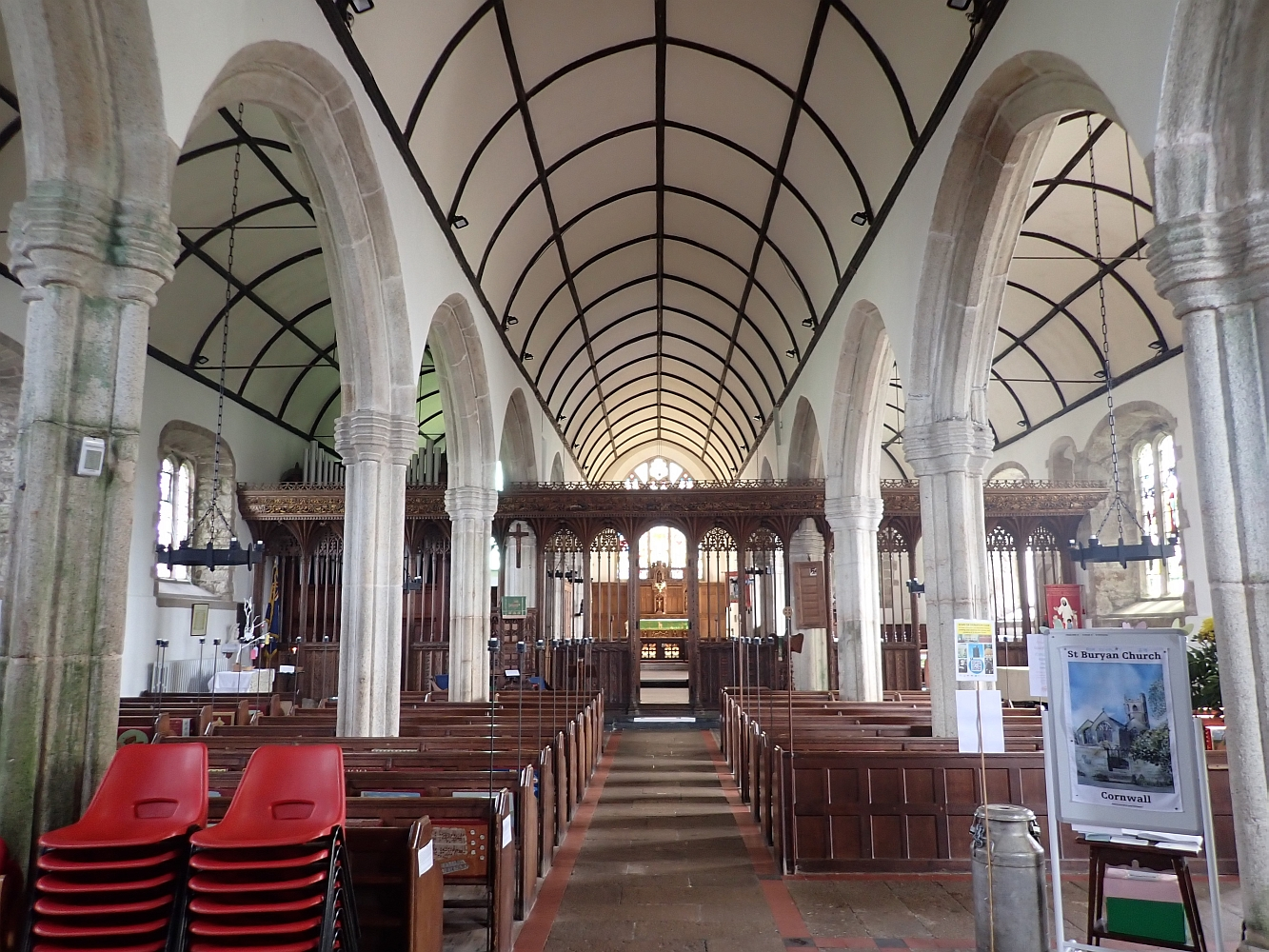
Church interior

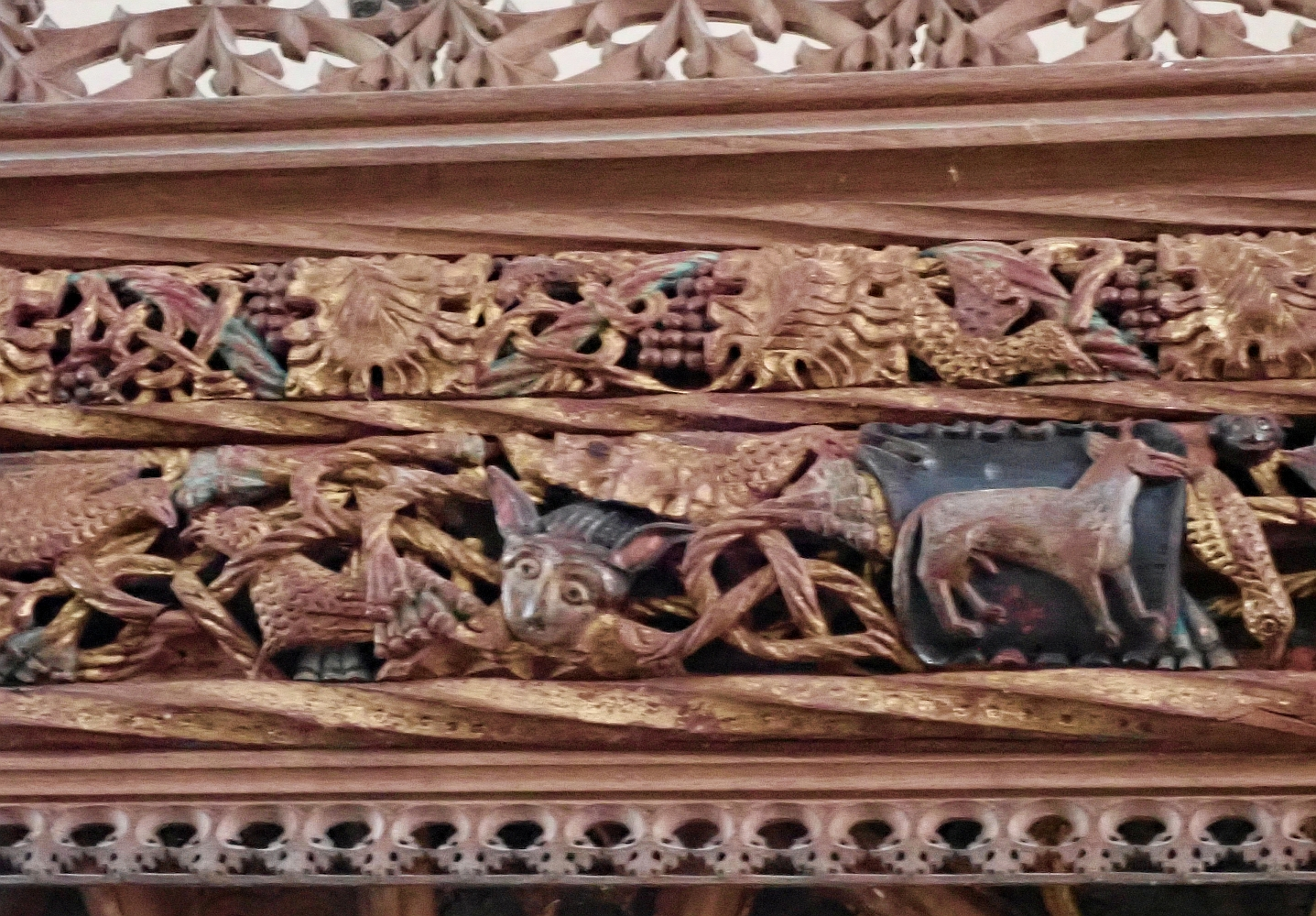
Rood screen detail

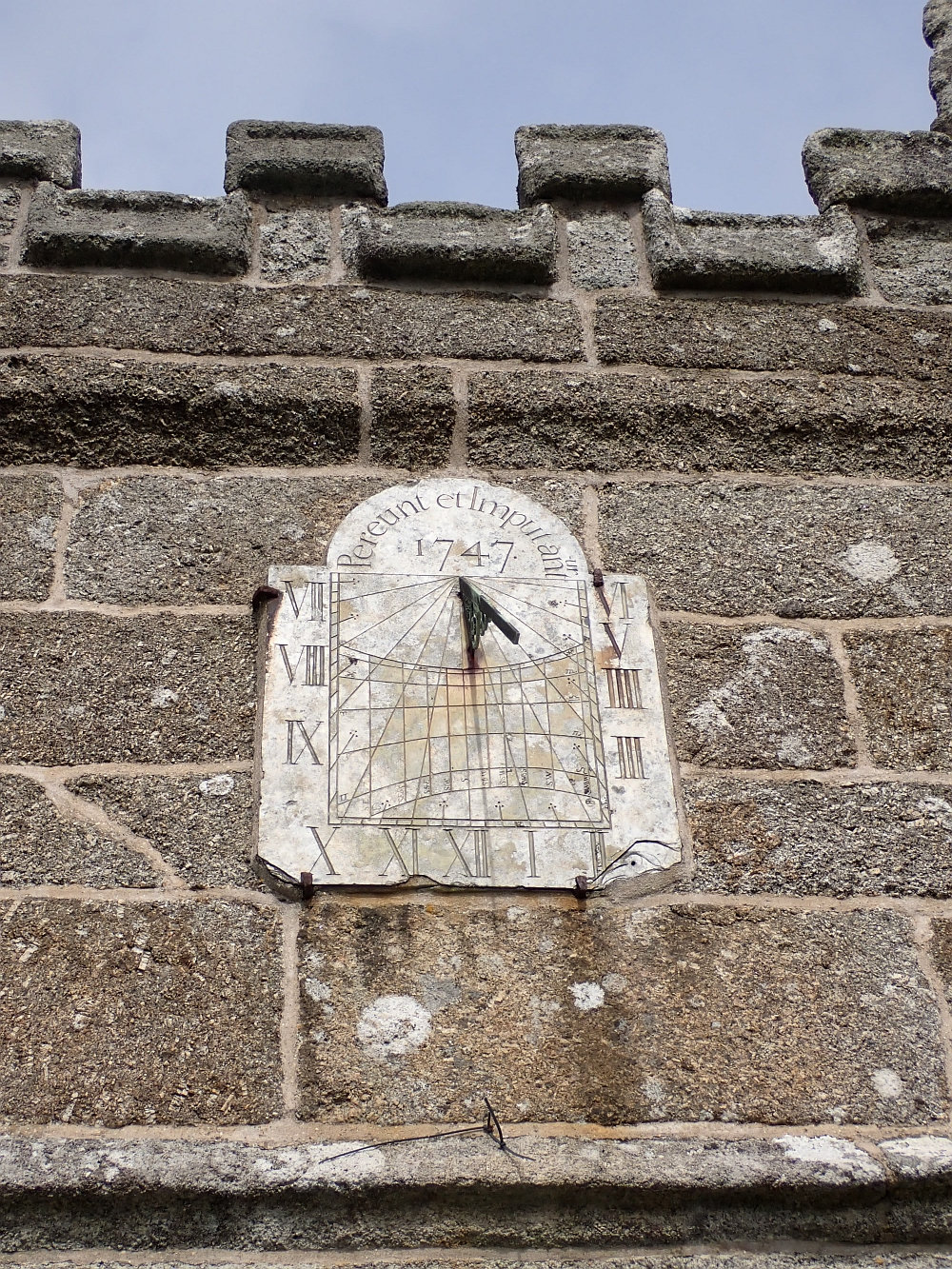
Exterior sundial

== See also ==
- Charter of St Buryan
