= St Loy's Cove =

Coordinates: 50.052°N 5.600°W

St Loy's Cove: Cornish: Porth Telow
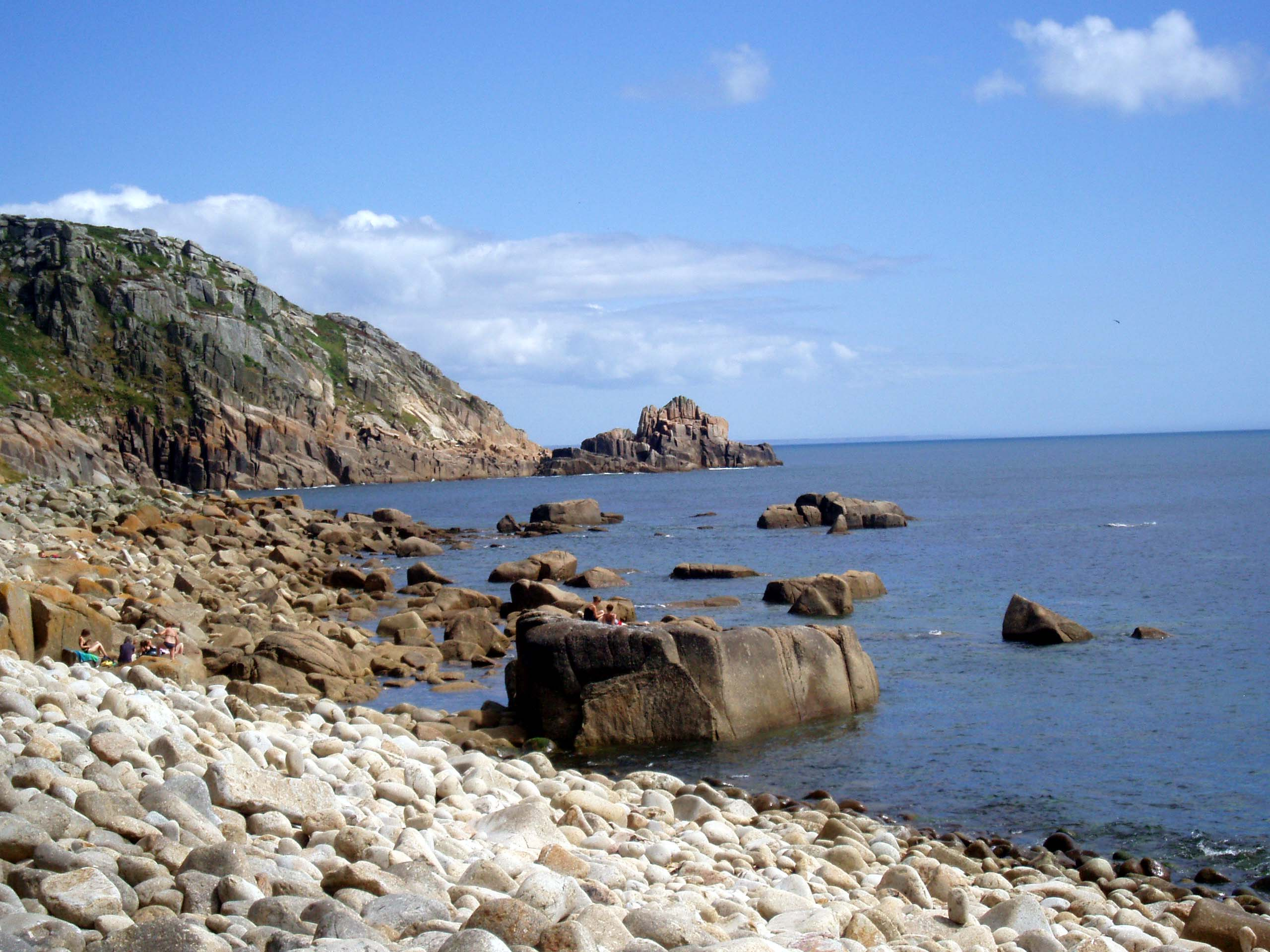
- St Loy's Cove with Boskenna Cliff and Boscawen Point

- Location within Cornwall
- OS grid reference: SW422230
- Civil parish: St Buryan
- Unitary authority: Cornwall
- Ceremonial county: Cornwall
- Region: South West
- Country: England
- Sovereign state: United Kingdom
- Post town: Penzance
- Postcode district: TR19
- Dialling code: 01736
- Police: Devon and Cornwall
- Fire: Cornwall
- Ambulance: South Western
- UK Parliament: St Ives

St Loy's Cove (Cornish: Porth Telow, meaning Telow's cove) is a small wooded valley and beach in the civil parish of St Buryan in Cornwall, England, UK. It is located two miles to the south of St Buryan churchtown, and between Penberth and Lamorna. There are just a few buildings in the cove, one of which, Cove Cottage, provides bed and breakfast and a cafe. St Loy's is within the Cornwall Area of Outstanding Natural Beauty (AONB), the Boscawen SSSI (Site of Special Scientific Interest) and is part of a GCR Geological Conservation Review site. The South West Coast Path passes through the cove.

== Geography ==
The stream at the bottom of the valley flows out to sea under a boulder storm beach backed by soft orange–brown cliffs of head deposits formed by solifluction when the climate was similar to that of Greenland's today. These cliffs are easily eroded and amongst the rounded boulders on the beach are irregular shaped granite stones that have fallen from the cliff.

=== Boscawen SSSI ===
The Boscawen SSSI, which encompasses the whole of the cove, "is a nationally important site for Quaternary geomorphology and Quaternary stratigraphy. Coastal exposures at the site show a sequence of granitic shore platform overlain in turn by raised beach deposits and head deposits".
