= St Buryan =

Village in southwest Cornwall, England

Coordinates: 50.075°N 5.621°W

St Buryan: Cornish: Pluwveryan
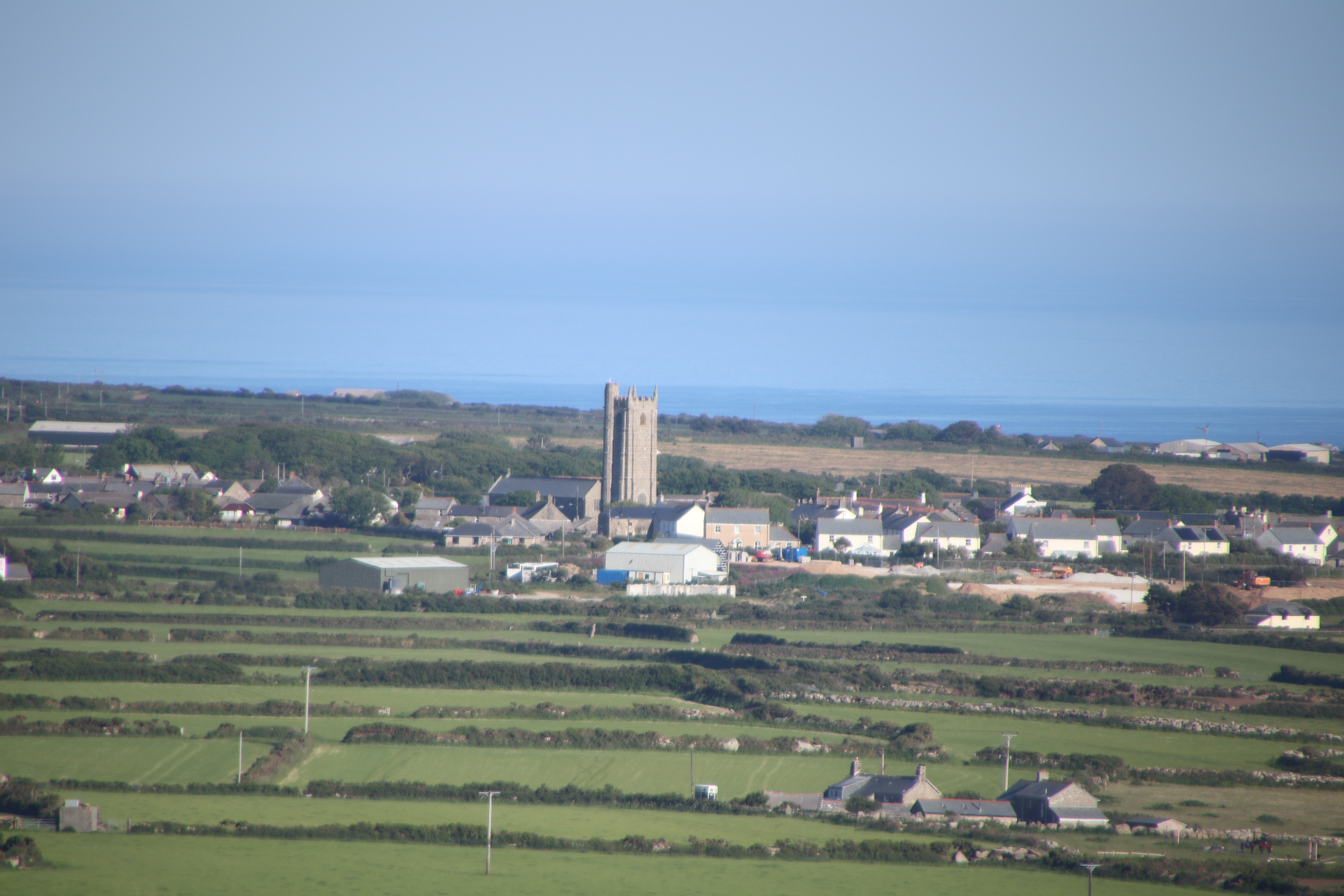
- St Buryan church seen from afar

- Location within Cornwall
- Interactive map of St Buryan
- Population: 1,412 (United Kingdom Census 2011)
- OS grid reference: SW409257
- Civil parish: St Buryan, Lamorna and Paul
- Unitary authority: Cornwall
- Ceremonial county: Cornwall
- Region: South West
- Country: England
- Sovereign state: United Kingdom
- Post town: PENZANCE
- Postcode district: TR19
- Dialling code: 01736
- Police: Devon and Cornwall
- Fire: Cornwall
- Ambulance: South Western
- UK Parliament: St Ives

St Buryan (Cornish: Pluwveryan) is a village and former civil parish, now in the parish of St Buryan, Lamorna and Paul in Cornwall, England, United Kingdom. In 2011 the parish had a population of 1412.

The village of St Buryan is situated approximately 5 miles (8.0 km) west of Penzance along the B3283 towards Land's End. Three further minor roads also meet at St Buryan, two link the village with the B3315 towards Lamorna, and the third rejoins the A30 at Crows-an-Wra.

St Buryan parish encompassed the villages of St. Buryan, Lamorna, and Crows-an-Wra and shared boundaries with the parishes of Sancreed and St Just to the north, Sennen and St Levan (with which it has close ties) to the west, with Paul to the east and by the sea in the south. An electoral parish also exists stretching from Land's End to the north coast but avoiding St Just. The population of this ward at the 2011 census was 4,589.

Named after the Irish Saint Buriana, the parish is situated in an area of outstanding natural beauty and is a popular tourist destination. It has been a designated conservation area since 1990 and is near many sites of special scientific interest in the surrounding area.

The parish is dotted with evidence of Neolithic activity, from stone circles and Celtic crosses to burial chambers and ancient holy wells. The village of St Buryan itself is also a site of special historic interest, and contains many listed buildings including the famous grade I listed church. The bells of St Buryan's Church, which have recently undergone extensive renovation, are the heaviest full circle peal of six anywhere in the world. The parish also has a strong cultural heritage.

Many painters of the Newlyn School including Samuel John "Lamorna" Birch were based at Lamorna in the south-east of the parish. St Buryan Village Hall was also the former location of Pipers Folk Club, created in the late 1960s by celebrated Cornish singer Brenda Wootton.

== Geography ==
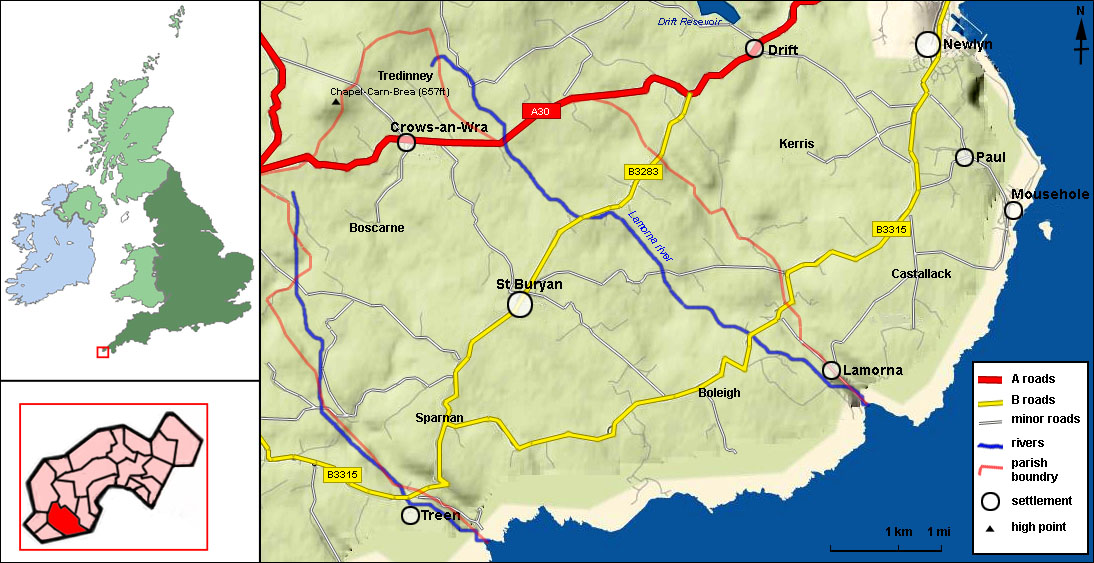
Topographical map of St. Buryan parish showing location within the UK (left, top) and within the former Penwith district (inset, bottom)

The parish, which is generally fertile and well cultivated, comprises 6,972 acres (2,821 ha) of land, 3 acres (1.2 ha) of water and 18 acres (7.3 ha) of foreshore and lies predominantly on granite. It is more elevated at its northern part and slopes gently north to south-east towards the sea. Carn Brea, (50°09'N, 5°65W), often described as the first hill in Cornwall (from a westerly perspective), sits at its northernmost edge and rises 657 feet (200 m) above sea level The hill is also an important historical site showing evidence of neolithic activity, as well as the remains of the chapel from which it is named. Toward the south is the village of St Buryan, which sits on a plateau and is centrally sited within the parish. Further to the south the terrain slopes down toward the sea, ending in several deep cut river valleys at Lamorna, Penberth and St Loy that are both sheltered and heavily forested. West of St Buryan, toward St Levan, the terrain again gently descends, causing the ground to become more marshy and waterlogged and less suitable for growing arable crops. East of the village the land also slopes away toward Drift, and its reservoir, past the wooded area at Pridden and the deep cut valley at Trelew (in which a steep embankment has been built to carry the B3283 road). Other settlements of note in the parish include Crows-an-Wra to the north, as well as Sparnon and Tregarnoe further south (see map, right). Since 1990 St Buryan and the surrounding region has been designated a conservation area by Penwith District Council; recognising the village's status as an area of special architectural and historic interest and preventing development that might alter the village's character.

== Toponymy ==
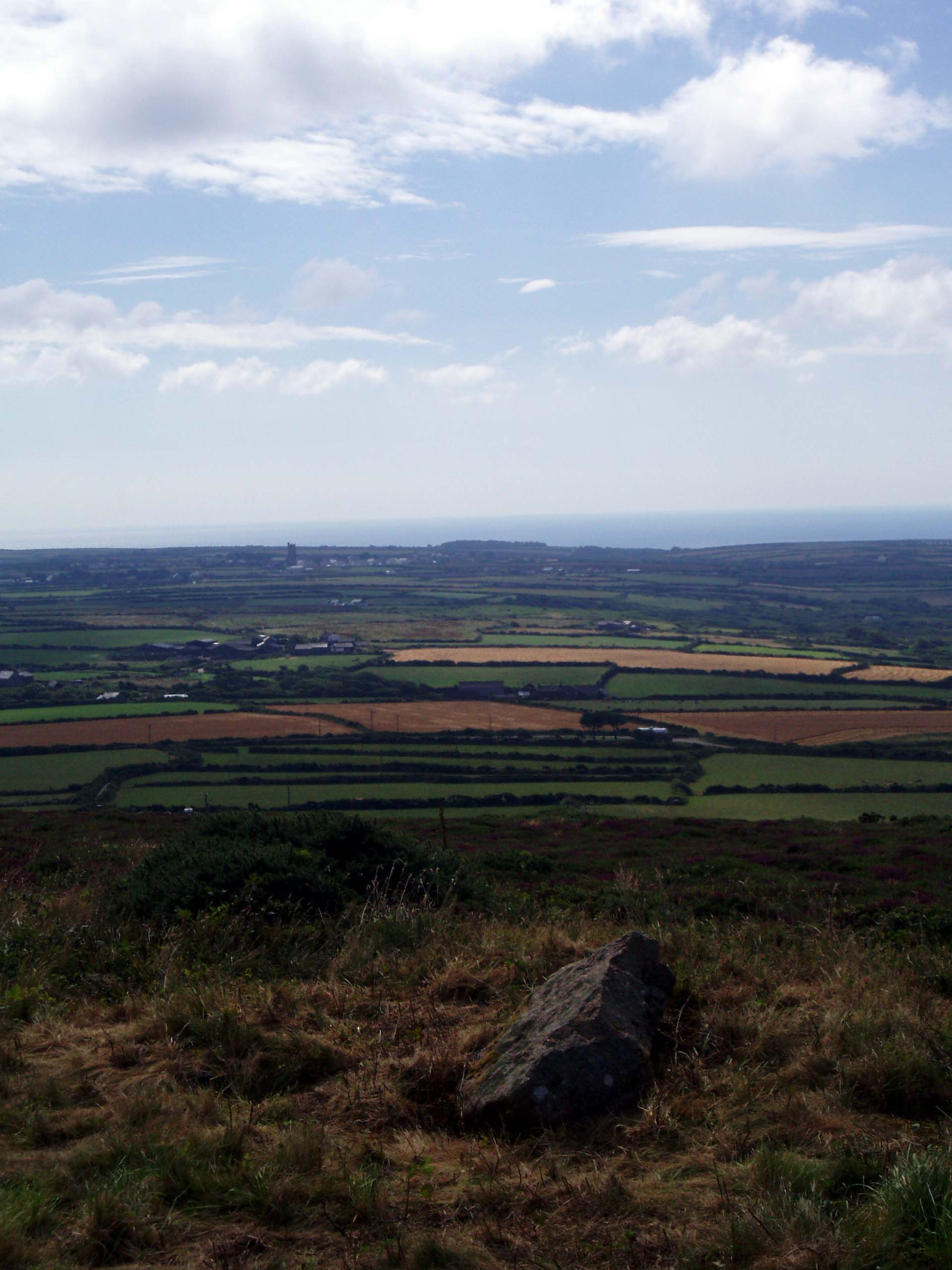
The parish of St Buryan as seen looking south from Chapel Carn Brea, the highest point in the parish

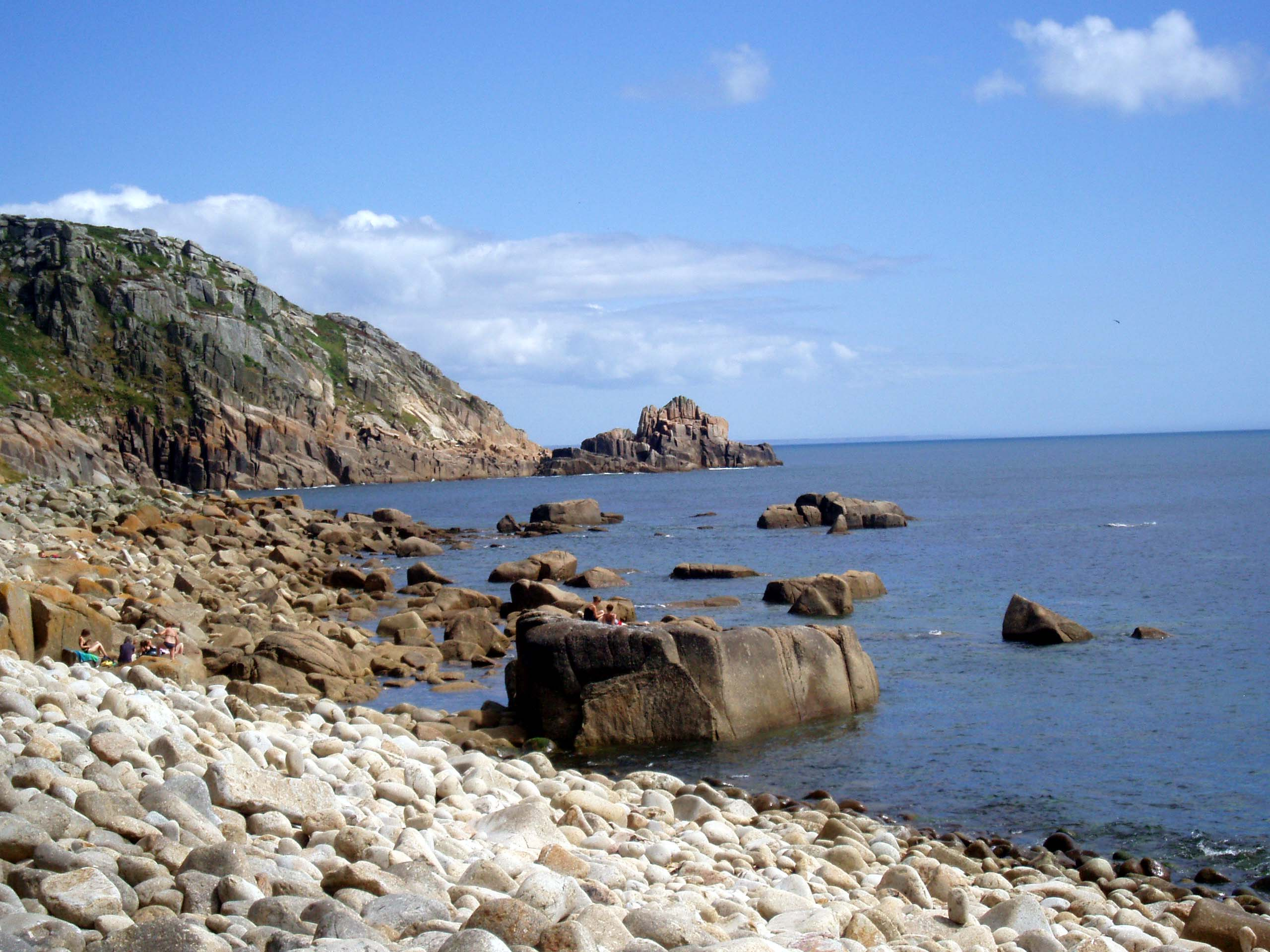
St Loy's Cove in the south of the parish

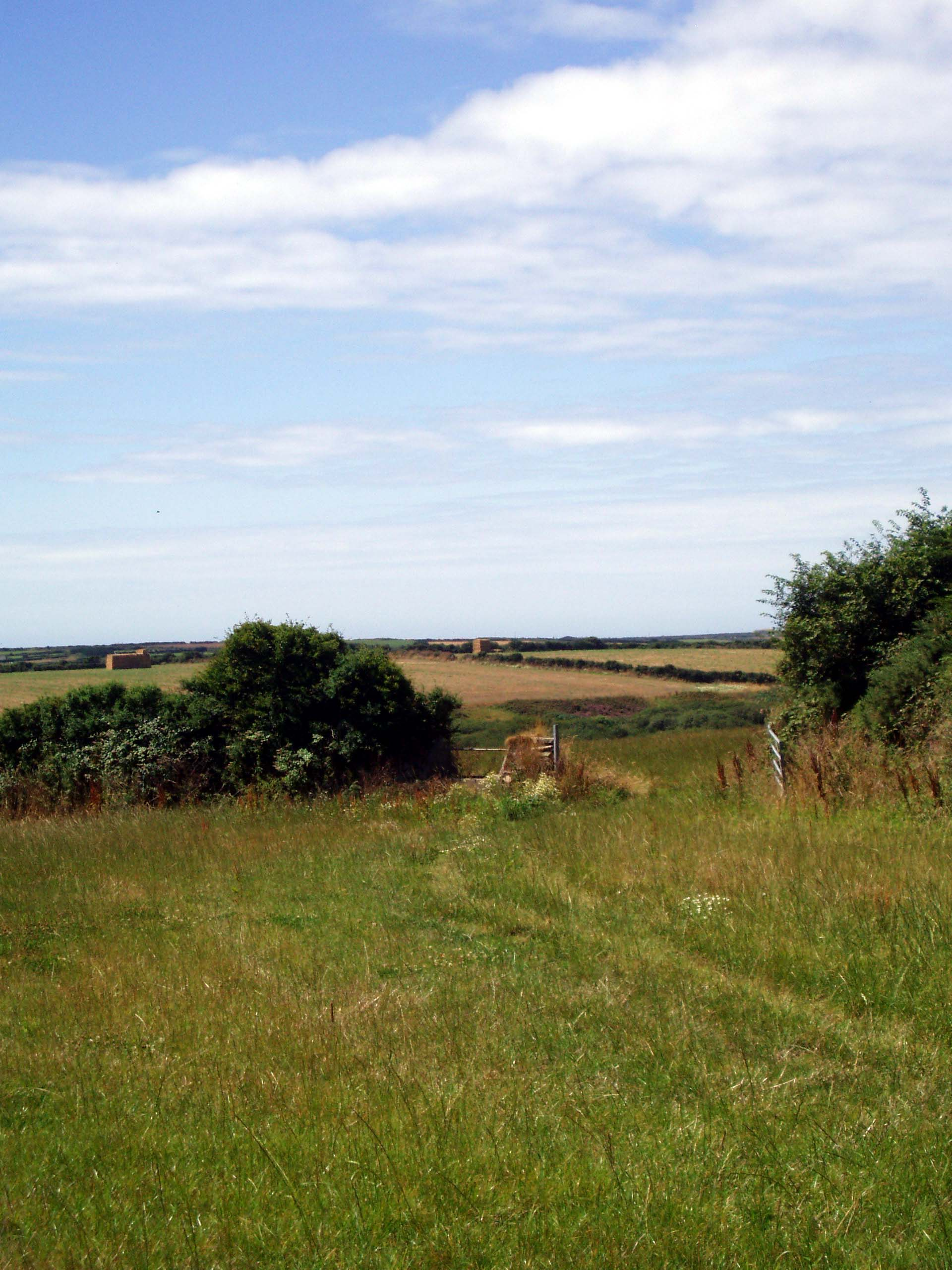
Countryside south of St Buryan

The village is named after the 6th century Irish Christian missionary Saint Buriana (also sometimes called Beriana, Buriena, or Beriena). The local legend describes how, whilst ministering to the local inhabitants from the oratory that stood on the site of the current church, Saint Buriana was abducted by the local king, Geraint (or Gereint) of Dumnonia. Saint Piran, patron saint of Cornwall and also a fellow missionary, negotiated for her release, but the reticent Geraint agreed only on the caveat that he be awoken by a cuckoo calling across the snow, something which would be highly unlikely in mid-winter. The legend states that Saint Piran prayed through the night whilst the snow fell, and in the morning Geraint was awoken by a cuckoo's song. He was so taken aback by the miracle that he honoured his pledge, however, shortly afterwards he changed his mind and tried to recapture Buriana. Buriana is said to have died as Geraint tried to re-imprison her, and was purportedly buried on the site of her chapel.

== History ==
St Buryan and the surrounding area is rich in history and has been a centre of human activity for several thousand years.

=== Early Neolithic period ===
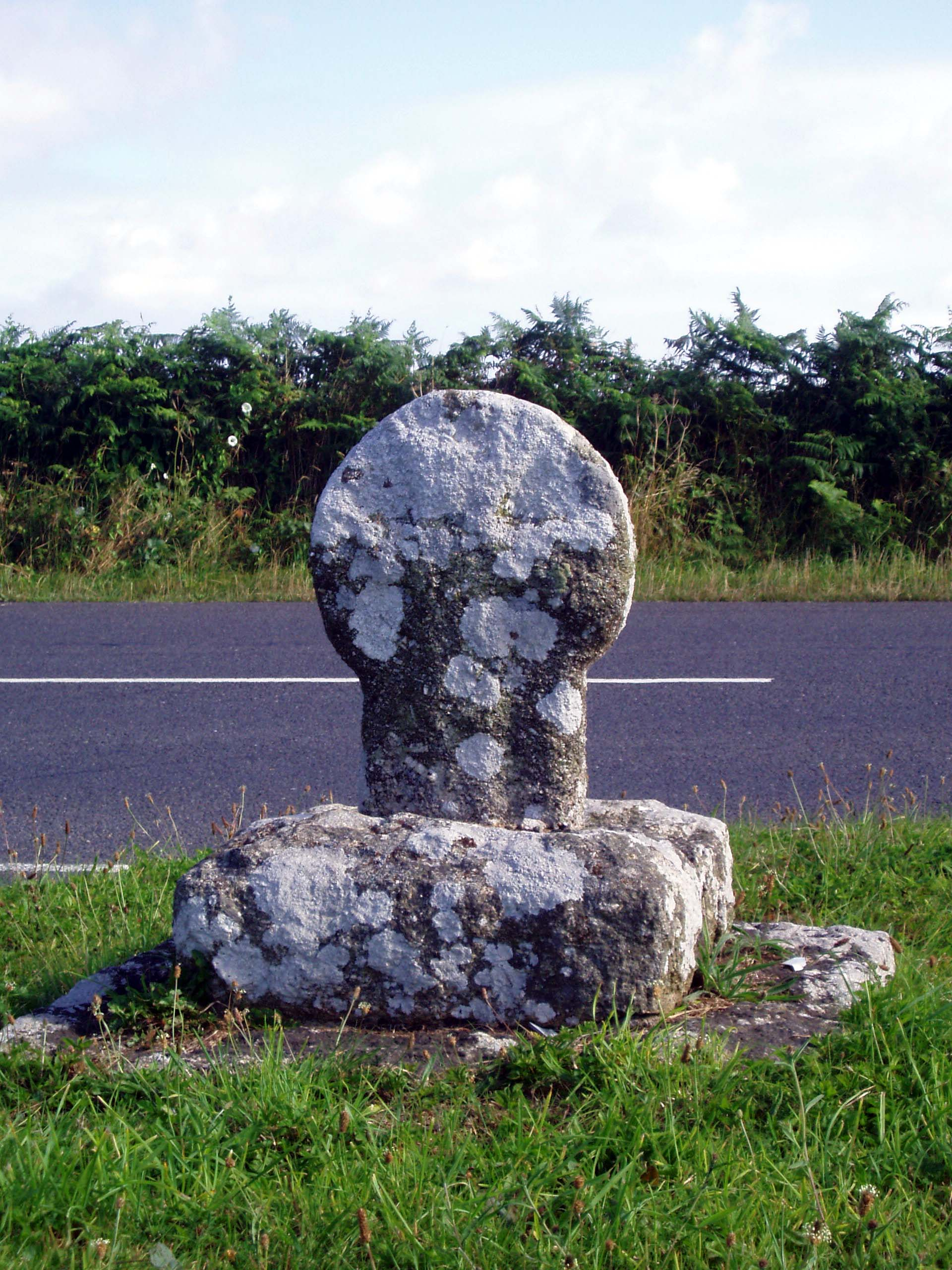
Celtic cross near Chapel Carn Brea in the north of St. Buryan parish

The area surrounding St Buryan was in use by humans in Neolithic times, as is evident from their surviving monuments. One mile (1.6 km) to the north of St Buryan lies Boscawen-Un, a Neolithic stone circle containing 19 stones around a leaning central pillar. The circle is also associated with two nearby standing stones or menhirs. Although somewhat overgrown, the site can be reached by travelling along the A30 west of Drift and is only a few hundred metres south of the road. A more accessible stone circle, The Merry Maidens, lies 2 miles (3.2 km) to the south of the village in a field along the B3315 toward Land's End. This much larger circle comprises nineteen granite megaliths some as much as 1.4 metres (4 ft 7 in) tall, is approximately 24 metres (79 ft) in diameter and is thought to be complete. Stones are regularly spaced around the circle with a gap or entrance at its eastern edge. The Merry Maidens are also called Dawn's Men, which is likely to be a corruption of the Cornish Dans Maen, or Stone Dance. The local myth about the creation of the stones suggests that nineteen maidens were turned into stone as punishment for dancing on a Sunday. The pipers' two megaliths some distance north-east of the circle are said to be the petrified remains of the musicians who played for the dancers. This legend was likely initiated by the early Christian Church to prevent old pagan habits continuing at the site.

Like Stonehenge and other stone monuments built during this period the original purpose of such stone circles is unknown, although there is strong evidence that they may have been ceremonial or religious sites. Many other lone standing stones from the neolithic period can be seen around the parish, at sites including Pridden, Trelew, Chyangwens and Trevorgans. In addition to menhirs there are 12 stone crosses within the parish, including two fine examples in St Buryan itself, one in the churchyard, and the other in the centre of the village. These take the form of a standing stone, sometimes carved into a Celtic cross but more often left roughly circular with a carved figure on the face. It is thought that many of these are pagan in origin, dating from the Neolithic and later periods, but were adapted by the early Christian church to remove evidence of the previous religion. These crosses are often remote and mark/protect ancient crossing points. Other examples in the parish can be found at Crows-an-Wra, Trevorgans and Vellansaga.

=== Bronze and Iron Ages ===
Only several hundred yards from the site of the Merry Maidens lies a Bronze Age burial chamber, Cruk Tregyffian, that was discovered (and unfortunately damaged) during widening of the adjacent B3315 road. The circular barrow is composed of stone uprights decorated with cupmarks, dry stone walling and four capstones. Although the original decorated stone has been removed to Truro museum to protect it against weathering, a replica now sits in its place. Further east along the B3315 road, and only 1 mile (1.6 km) from Lamorna, lies the Boleigh Fogou, considered to be one of the best remaining monuments of its kind in Cornwall. Built in the Iron Age, the purpose of fogous (derived from the Cornish word for cave) is not known. It has been speculated, however, that they could have been used for food storage or for religious ceremonies. The fogou at Boleigh is extensive and has a large entranceway that leads to a long passage with classic dry stone wall and lintel construction. A low doorway just inside the entrance leads to a much narrower and lower passage that turns ninety degrees left after a few metres. After the turn the passage continues for a metre or two before ending; there is a modern metal support grille set into the roof above this section.

=== Middle Ages ===
Human activity in the parish continued and intensified in the Middle Ages. A revolt against the Anglo-Saxon English in 931 AD by the Cornish Celts (supported by the Danes) led to a battle southeast of the village at Boleigh where a farm and hamlet now stands. The Saxon king Athelstan crushed the resistance, before continuing on to conquer the Isles of Scilly. A local story tells of ancient armour being ploughed up in the nearby fields at Gul Reeve (a corruption of the Cornish Gwel Ruth, meaning red field). The establishment of a church and monastery in the village by Athelstan (see Religion) contributed to the rising importance of the parish. This was not without problems, and in 1328 St Buryan was excommunicated from the church over a row about control of the religious matters in the parish. It was not reinstated for another eight years.

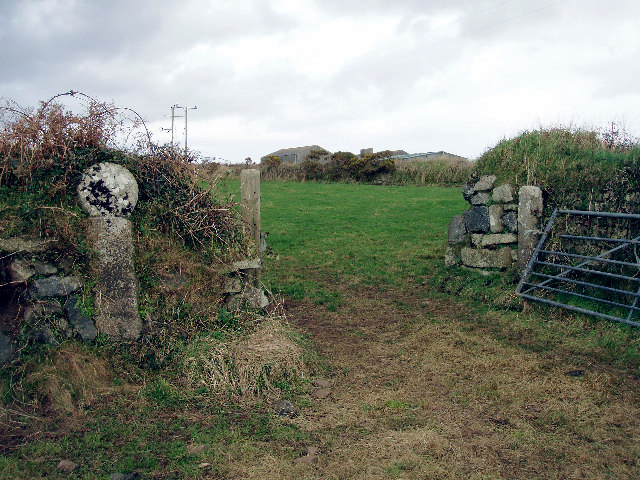
A cross near Down's Barn Farm

After the Norman Conquest the area fell under the control of Robert, Count of Mortain, a half-brother of William the Conqueror, and the parish of St Buryan is mentioned in the Domesday Book with the old Cornish name of Eglosberrie (and elsewhere Eglosburrie) meaning 'church of St. Buryan':

"EGLOSBERRIE; it was free in the time of King Edward (the Confessor, i.e. before 1066); 1 hide (about 120 acres). Land for 8 ploughs (requiring, perhaps, 8 oxen each); ½ plough there. 6 villagers and 6 smallholders. Pasture, 20 acres. Value 10s; when the Count (of Mortain) received the land, value 40s. Also 12 cattle and 12 sheep."

St Buryan was visited by King John in the early 13th century who, after landing at Sennen from Ireland, travelled to the parish to stay the night. The purpose of the visit was an inspection of local mining works in the area and resulted in the import of German engineers to improve their efficiency. By the 14th century St Buryan's importance as a regional centre had grown sufficiently that in 1302 King Edward granted it a weekly market, to be held on Saturdays, and two yearly fairs of three days each to be held on the feasts of St Buryan and St Martin.

=== Tudor and Stuart period ===
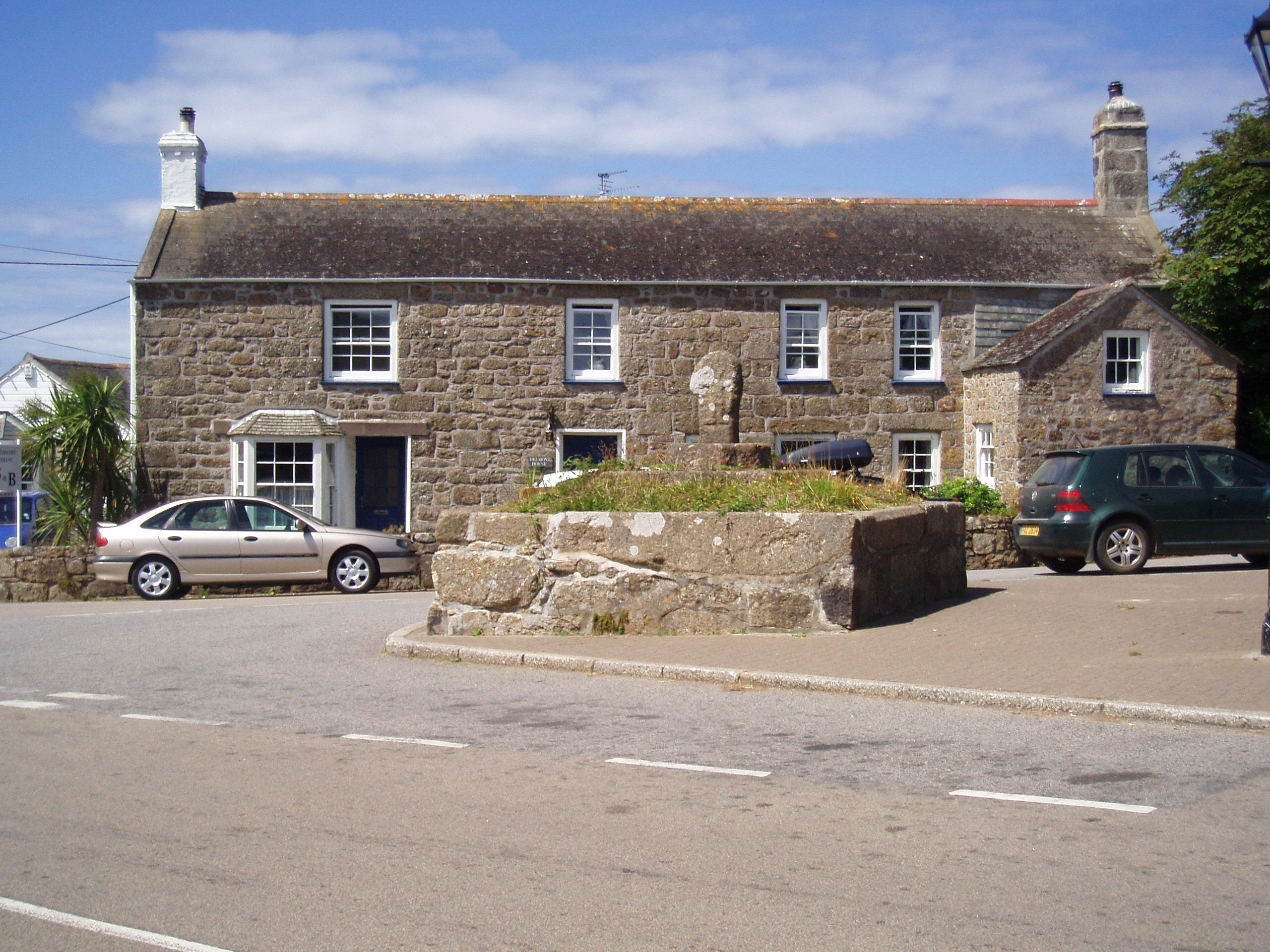
Stone cross in St Buryan churchtown and Belmont house, former location of the King's Arms public house, in the background

Perhaps one of the most notable residents of St Buryan during the seventeenth century was one William Noy, an MP (Grampound 1603–1614, Fowey 1623–1625 and Helston 1627–1631) and member of the court of King Charles I, who was born and lived on the Pendrea estate within the parish. He was created Attorney-general to the king in October 1631 and specialised in reviving long forgotten taxes to raise money to fund the King's lifestyle during his period of Personal Rule. His advice controversially led to the imposition of ship money which is thought by many to have helped trigger the English Civil War. Noy suffered from stones, and died in great pain before being buried at the church in New Brentford in 1634.

Smuggling activity in Britain became more prevalent though the Tudor and Stuart period reaching its peak at the end of the 18th century. High rates of duty were levied on imported wine, spirits, and other luxury goods to pay for Britain's expensive wars with France and the United States. Cornwall was a haven for smugglers at this time, with its many secluded coves ideally suited for evasion of the duty, a smuggling provided a highly profitable venture for impoverished fishermen and seafarers. St Buryan was no different in this respect, and also home to smuggling activity. Thomas Johns, a known smuggler and agent of smugglers, was the landlord of the Kings Arms public house, formerly on the site of Belmont House in the village square, who divided his time between St Buryan and his liquor establishments in Roscoff, Brittany. More famous still was the Lamorna wink public house near Lamorna Cove which was also a base for smugglers. The pub was so named as winking at the barman would reputedly allow you to purchase smuggled spirits.

=== Industrial Revolution ===
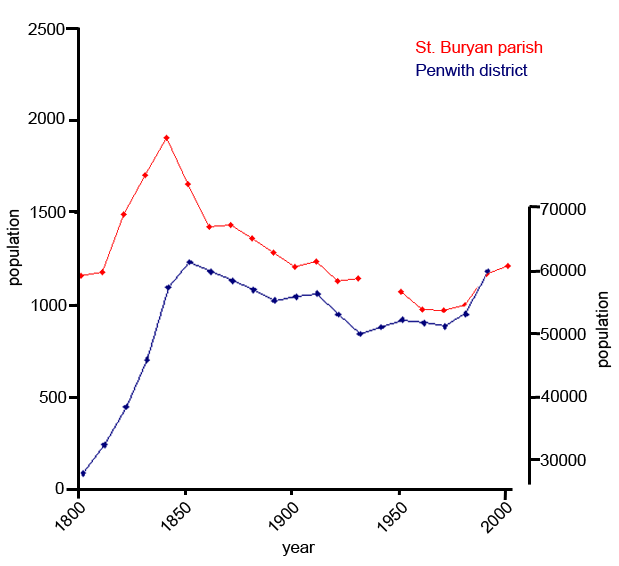
Population change from 1800 to the present day in St Buryan parish (lefthand scale) compared to Penwith district(righthand scale).

Whereas St Buryan was an important regional religious centre during the Middle Ages due to its monastery and Royal Peculiar status, the importance of the parish to the district faded with the onset the Industrial Revolution. This was in part due to the destruction of the collegiate buildings during The Protectorate period after the English Civil War and also the gradual weakening of the political position of the Church of England that occurred during the eighteenth and nineteenth centuries. This loss of importance is reflected in the fact that the proportion of the district's population living in the parish fell from four and a half to less than two percent over this period. Unlike other parishes in Penwith, such as St Just, St Buryan was not a major focus of tin mining activity during the eighteenth and nineteenth centuries, having a mainly agrarian economy. After a spike in population in the early 19th century that is mirrored across the district and coincides both with the arrival of the railways and increased tin mining activity in Penwith, the population of the parish gradually declined over the next two hundred years (see figure right), in part due to the increased mechanisation of farming that the industrial revolution brought, requiring fewer people to work the land.

China clay, Cornwall's other great mining export in addition to tin, was mined in the parish for a brief period in the nineteenth century at two pits at Tredinney Common (1880) and Bartinney Downs by the Land's End China Clay Company. Traction engines were still a novelty in 1884 and one used for the transport of 30 tons of clay for shipment from Penzance drew large crowds. Although initially successful, by 1891 the clay pits had become economically unviable. A newly formed company, Zennorin Developments Ltd applied to reopen the pits in 1970, but was rejected on the grounds that it would spoil an area of outstanding natural beauty.

=== Twentieth century ===
After a period of decline during the twentieth century, which saw a reduction in the village's population (see figure), culminating in the loss of a blacksmiths, the local dairy, the village butchers and a café in the early nineties, St Buryan has been enjoying a renaissance, fuelled in part by an influx of new families. The local school has been expanded to include a hall and a fourth classroom and a new community centre has recently been built nearby.

In common with other settlements in the district such as Newlyn and Penzance, the post-war period saw the building of a council estate to the west of the village on land formerly part of Parcancady farm. The development was meant to provide affordable housing at a time of short supply in the post-war years. The estate subsequently expanded westward in the nineteen eighties and nineties. In the last census return, St Buryan parish was reported as containing contains 533 dwellings housing 1,215 people, 1,030 of which were living in the village itself.

== Religion ==
St Buryan has a long history of religious activity both through its historical connection with the church of the state, and later playing an important part in the Methodist revival of the 18th century, led by John Wesley who visited the parish and ministered on several occasions.

=== The Church of St Buryan ===
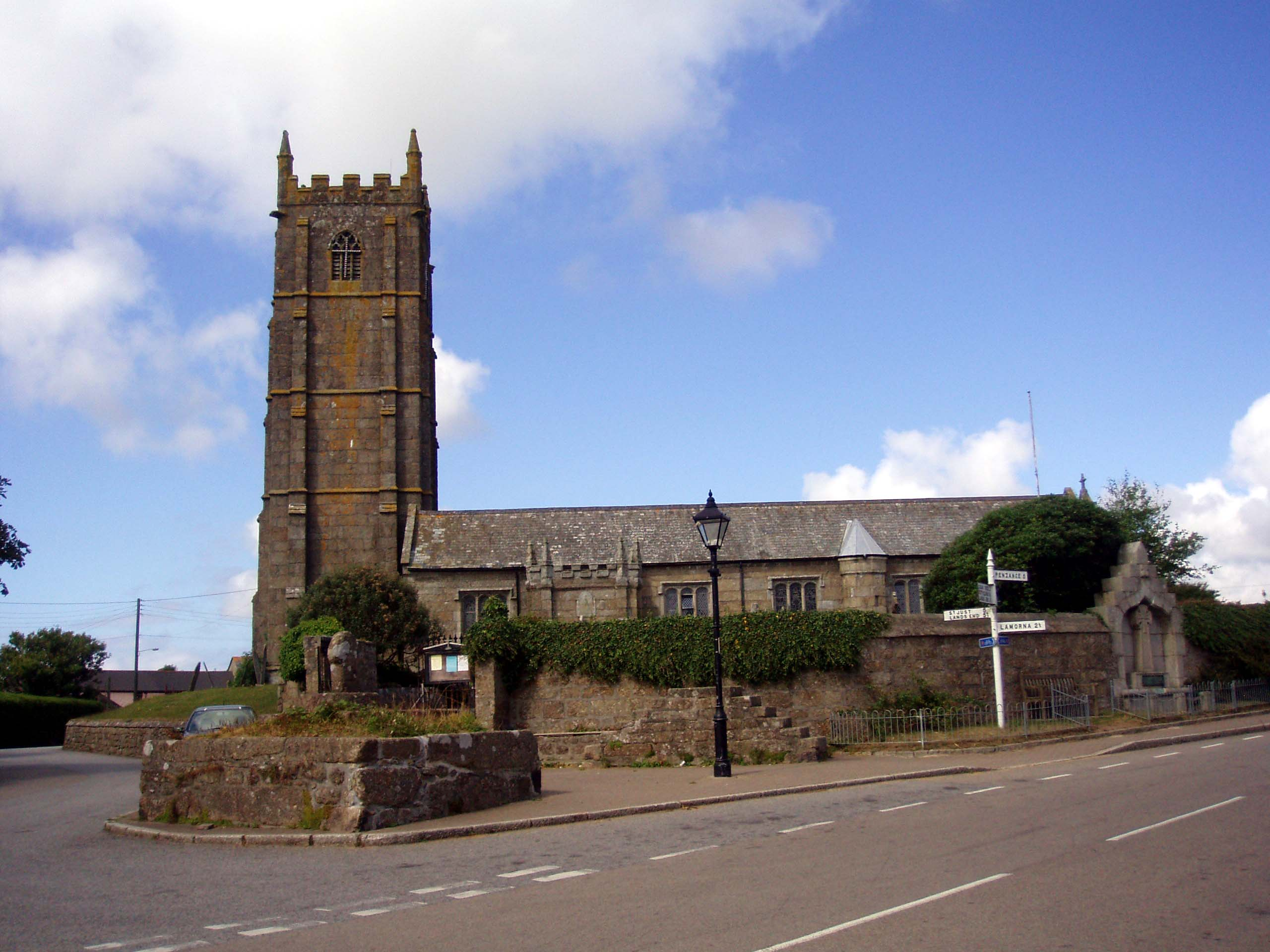
The church of St Buryan as seen from the south

A church has stood on the current site since ca. 930 AD, built by King Athelstan in thanks for his successful conquest of Cornwall on the site of the oratory of Saint Buriana (probably founded in the 6th century). The Charter from Athelstan endowed the building of collegiate buildings and the establishment of one of the earliest monasteries in Cornwall, and was subsequently enlarged and rededicated to the saint in 1238 by Bishop William Briwere. The collegiate establishment consisted of a dean and three prebendaries. Owing to the nature of the original Charter from King Athelstan, the parish of St Buryan was long regarded as a Royal Peculiar thus falling directly under the jurisdiction of the British monarch as a separate diocese, rather than the Church. This led to several hundred years of arguments between The Crown and the Bishop of Exeter over control of the parish, which came to a head in 1327 when blood was shed in the churchyard, and in 1328 St Buryan was excommunicated by the Bishop. St Buryan was not reinstated until 1336. Only two of the King's appointed Deans appear to have actually lived in the diocese of St Buryan for more than a few months, and the combination of these factors led to the subsequent ruinous state of the church in 1473. The church was subsequently rebuilt and enlarged, the tower was added in 1501 and further expansion took place in the late 15th and 16th centuries when the bulk of the present church building were added. Further restoration of the interior took place in 1814, and the present Lady Chapel was erected in 1956. The church is currently classified as a Grade I listed building. The Deanery was annexed in 1663 to the Bishopric of Exeter after the English Civil War, however, it was again severed during the episcopacy of Bishop Harris, who thus became the first truly independent dean. The current diocese holds jurisdiction over the parishes of St Buryan, St Levan, and Sennen. St Buryan church is famous for having the heaviest peal of six bells in the world, and a recent campaign to restore the church's bells, which had fallen into disuse, has enabled all six to be rung properly for the first time in decades. The church has four 15th century misericords, two either side of the chancel, each of which shows a plain shield.

=== Methodism ===
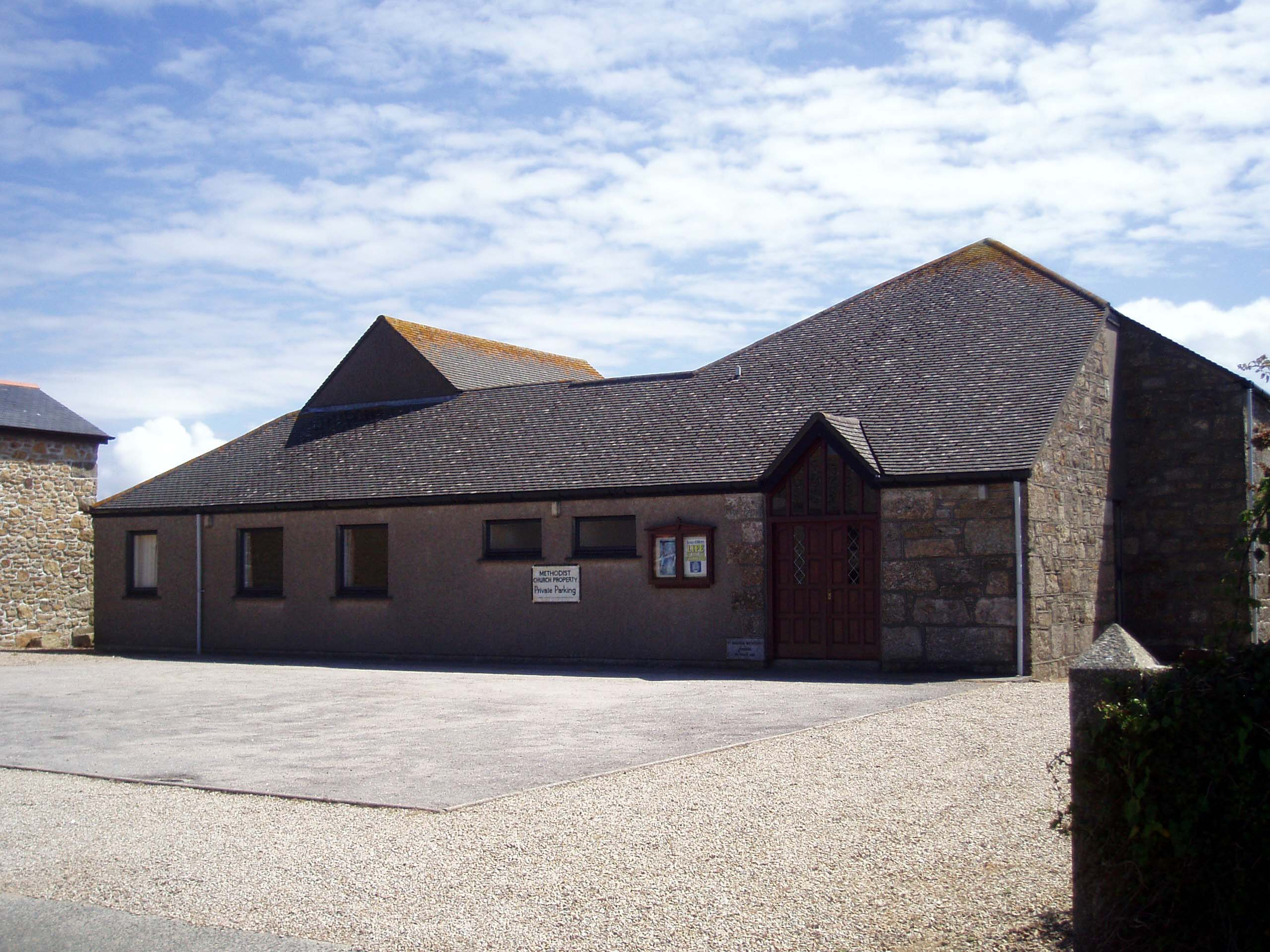
St Buryan Methodist chapel, rebuilt in 1981 after storm damage

John Wesley, the founding father of Methodism, visited the parish on several occasions, but was not well received at first. He first visited St Buryan in 1747 when he preached at Tredinney, and later attended services at the church in St Buryan during which the local clergyman is reputed to have made several caustic remarks about him. A second visit in 1766, during which he preached from outside the church, led to him being threatened with a whip by the local squire, however this only strengthened his resolve to return. The first Methodist chapel was built in 1783 on a site opposite the present chapel, on land purchased the previous year and inspected by Wesley himself during his last visit to the parish. In 1833, as Methodism became more popular in Cornwall, a second larger chapel was built on the site of the current one. This was subsequently rebuilt in 1981 after suffering storm damage to the old structure. Further chapels were built in the parish, at Crows-an-Wra in 1831 with seating for 220 as a replacement for an earlier chapel at nearby Treve and at Borah in 1817 with seating for 100, which was rebuilt in 1878. Both of these closed in 1981 to coincide with the enlargement of the St Buryan Chapel. A Bible Christian group was also founded in the village in about 1815. With growing support a proper chapel was built in 1860 on the site of the current Hosken's Meadow. This was closed in 1932 but left derelict for another 65 years before being demolished.

== Education ==
The first record of a school in the parish was in 1801, on a site adjacent to the old poorhouse beside the church buildings in the main village. This was administered through the poorhouse, whose trustees were also the trustees of the school. A new school was built in 1830 which now forms the village hall. The school was subscription based and pupils paid a penny a day toward their education. When compulsory education was introduced in 1875 these buildings were extended to deal with the influx of pupils. The school moved again to its present site, a new purpose built building along Rectory Road, in 1910.

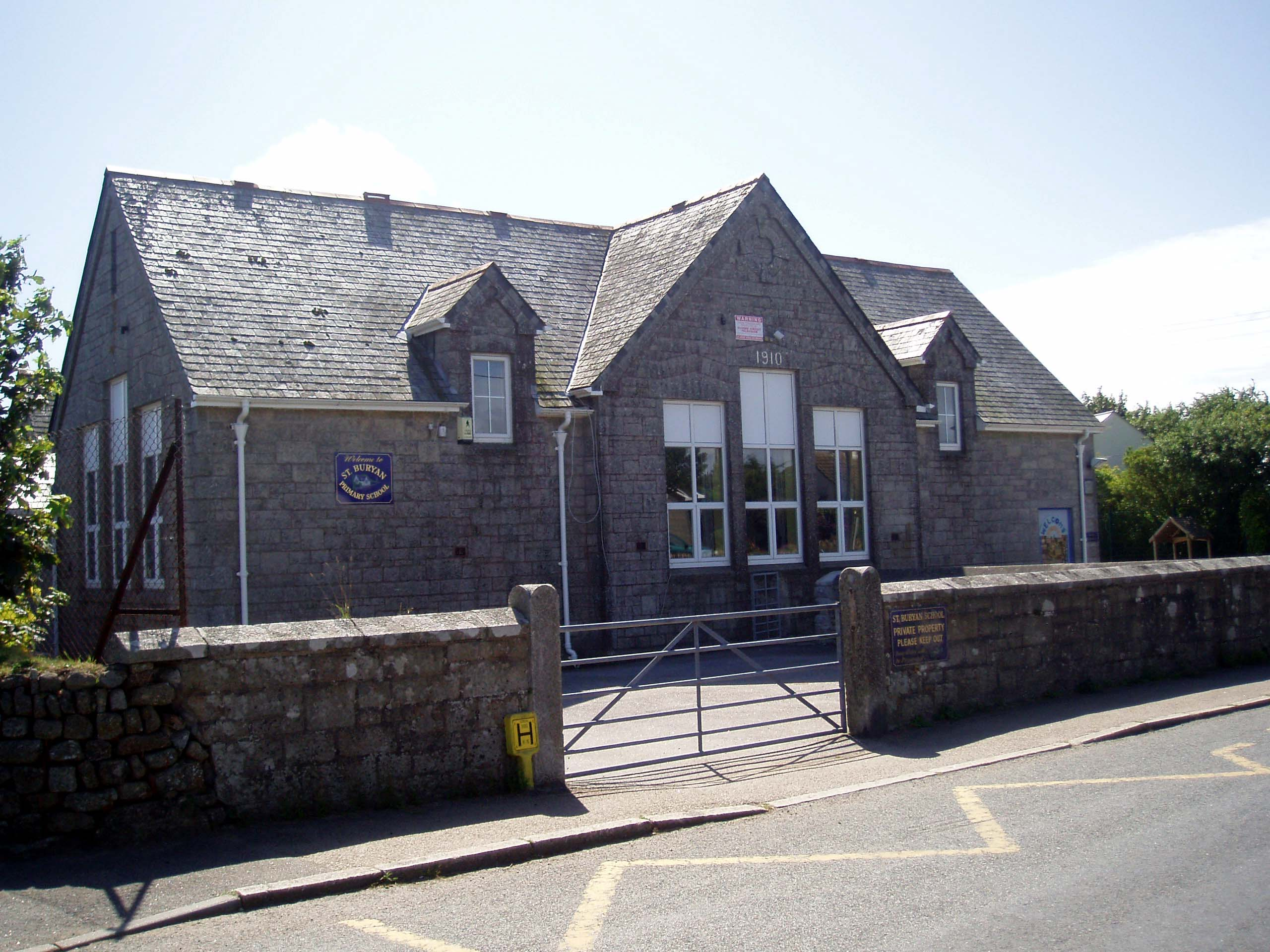
St Buryan primary school in Rectory Road St Buryan

Today St Buryan primary school teaches pupils between the ages of four and eleven and is a feeder school for nearby Cape Cornwall School. There was, until recently, an attached nursery for children of pre-school age, but this has subsequently moved to new premises in the village. For many years the school taught in its original three classrooms. Under the headship of Paul Gazzard, however, the site has been expanded to include a fourth classroom, a hall and gymnasium, a library and a new reception area. This expansion was made financially possible in part due to a spell as a grant maintained school in which the school had direct control over its own budget. Under the School Standards and Framework Act 1998 the school became a foundation school.

The school currently teaches 87 pupils from the parish and surrounding villages. There has been a steady rise in pupil numbers in recent years, mirroring the population rise in the parish as a whole, supported by the improved facilities. All pupils come from a white British background and use English as their first language. Nearly six percent of pupils have Statements of Special Educational Needs, which is above the national average. In its 2004 Ofsted inspection pupils' standards of achievement were classed as good overall with above average results in Science and English and very high attainment in Mathematics.

== Culture ==
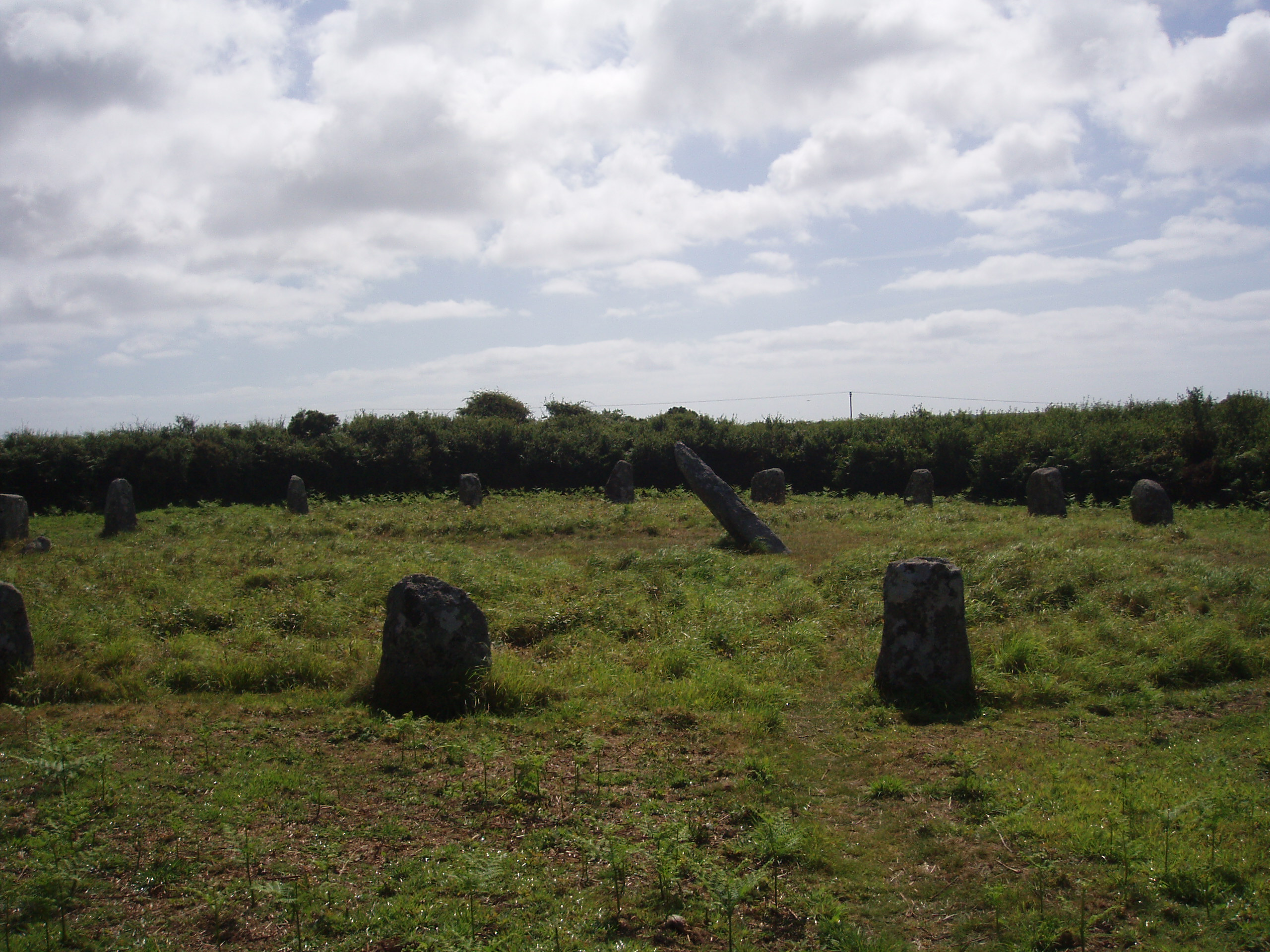
Boscawen-Un stone circle near St Buryan

Like much of the rest of Cornwall, St Buryan has many strong cultural traditions. The first Cornish Gorsedd (Gorseth Kernow) in over one thousand years was held in the parish in the stone circle at Boscawen-Un on 21 September 1928. The procession, guided by the bards of the Welsh Gorsedd and with speeches mostly in Cornish was aimed at promoting Cornish culture and literature. The modern Gorsedd has subsequently been held nine times in the parish including on the fiftieth anniversary, both at Boscawen-Un and at The Merry Maidens stone circle. There is also a regular Eisteddfod held in the village.

St Buryan is the home of a wisewoman, Cassandra Latham. In 1996 Cassandra Latham was appointed as the first-ever Pagan contact for hospital patients. Within one year she was having so many requests for her services that she became a self-employed "witch" and was no longer financially supported by the government.

The feast of St Buriana is celebrated on the Sunday nearest to 13 May (although the saint's official day is 1 May) consisting of fancy dress and competitions for the children of the village and usually other entertainments later in the evening. In the summer there are also several other festivals, including the agricultural preservation rally in which vintage tractor, farm equipment, rare breed animals and threshing demonstrations are shown as well as some vintage cars and traction engines. This is currently being hosted at Trevorgans Farm and is traditionally held on the last Saturday of July.

St Buryan is twinned with Calan in Morbihan, Brittany.

The local community radio station is Coast FM (formerly Penwith Radio), which broadcasts on 96.5 and 97.2 FM.

=== Cornish wrestling ===
Cornish wrestling tournaments, for prizes were held in St Buryan in the 1800s.

=== Literature, cinema and music ===
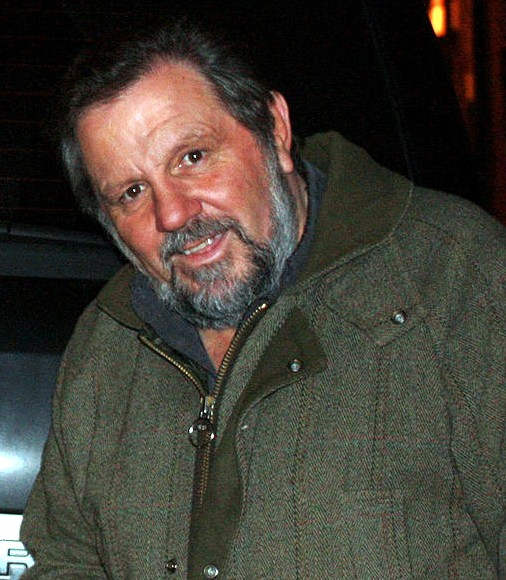
Jethro after his show at Retford in October 2008

Espionage novelist David John Moore Cornwell, better known as John le Carré, (whose books include The Spy Who Came in from the Cold and Tinker Tailor Soldier Spy) lived in St Buryan for more than forty years. Many of his novels have been adapted for film, the most recent being Our Kind of Traitor in 2016. The author Derek Tangye, who died in 1996, also lived and wrote in the parish for many years, writing over twenty books, the Minack Chronicles, about life in rural Cornwall (Minack deriving from Dorminack Farm). Sam Peckinpah's 1971 film Straw Dogs, starring Dustin Hoffman and Susan George, was filmed in St Buryan.

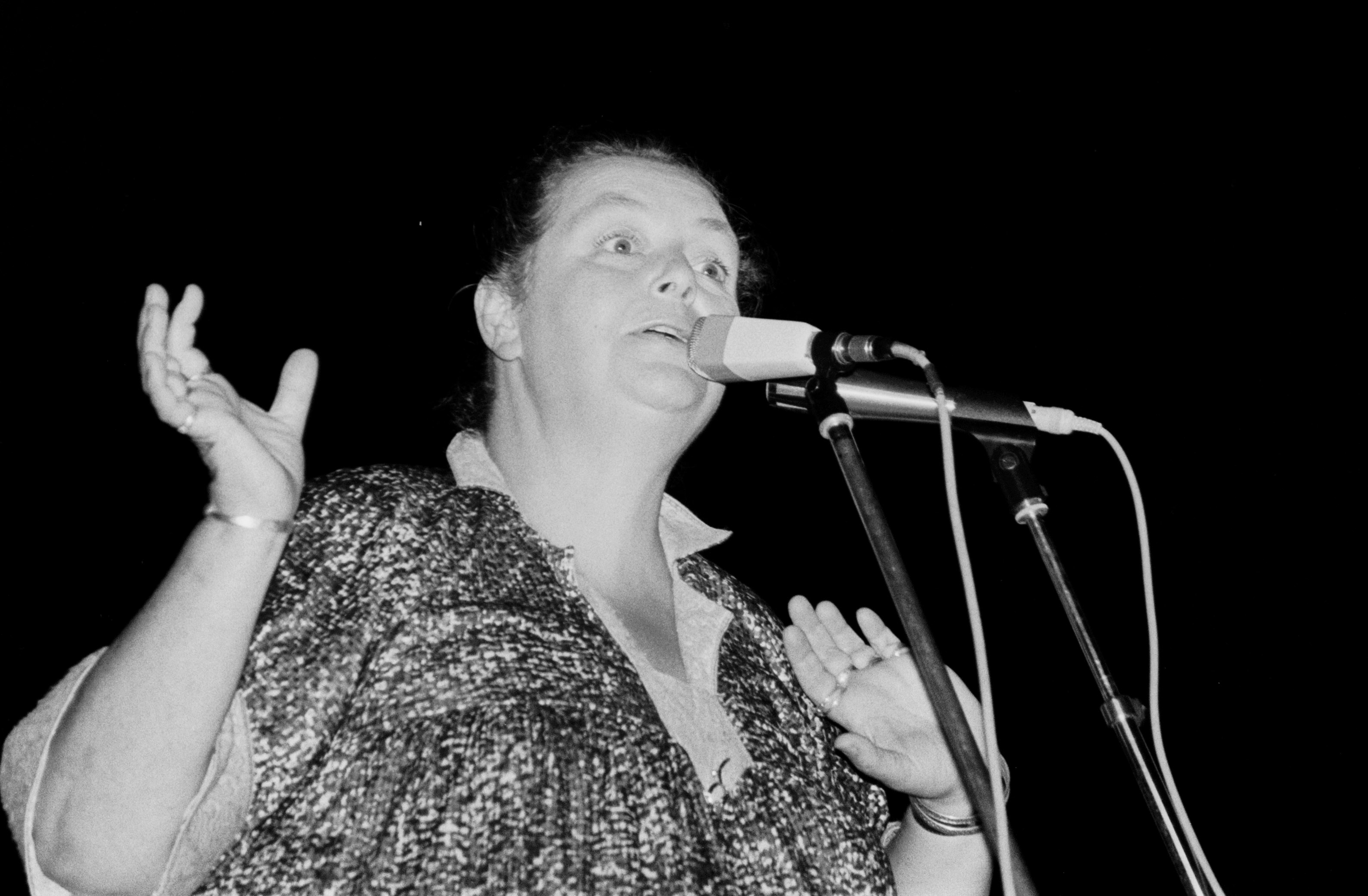
Brenda Wootton "The Voice of Cornwall"

Brenda Wootton, the well-known Cornish bard and folk singer, ran her celebrated 'Pipers Folk Club' in St Buryan Village Hall for a time in the late 1960s (later in Botallack). Continuing the musical tradition, the village is also home to St Buryan Male Voice Choir who fulfil many engagements every year and adopt a variety of musical styles. The choir was founded over sixty years ago by Hugh Rowe; his son Geoffrey Rowe was born in the village, and made his name as a singer and comedian performing as Jethro. A female voice choir, the Buriana Singers, also exists.

=== Art ===
In the late 19th and early 20th centuries the parish attracted many painters from the Newlyn school, particularly at Lamorna where a small colony led by Samuel John "Lamorna" Birch was established and included painters such as Alfred Munnings, Laura Knight and Harold Knight who lived and painted there. These artists were attracted by cheap living, the changeable quality of the light and a desire to paint En plein air. This style of painting had become increasingly popular after the introduction of paints in tubes in the 1870s, an innovation which meant that painters no longer had to make their own paints by grinding and mixing dry pigment powders with linseed oil.

== Economy ==
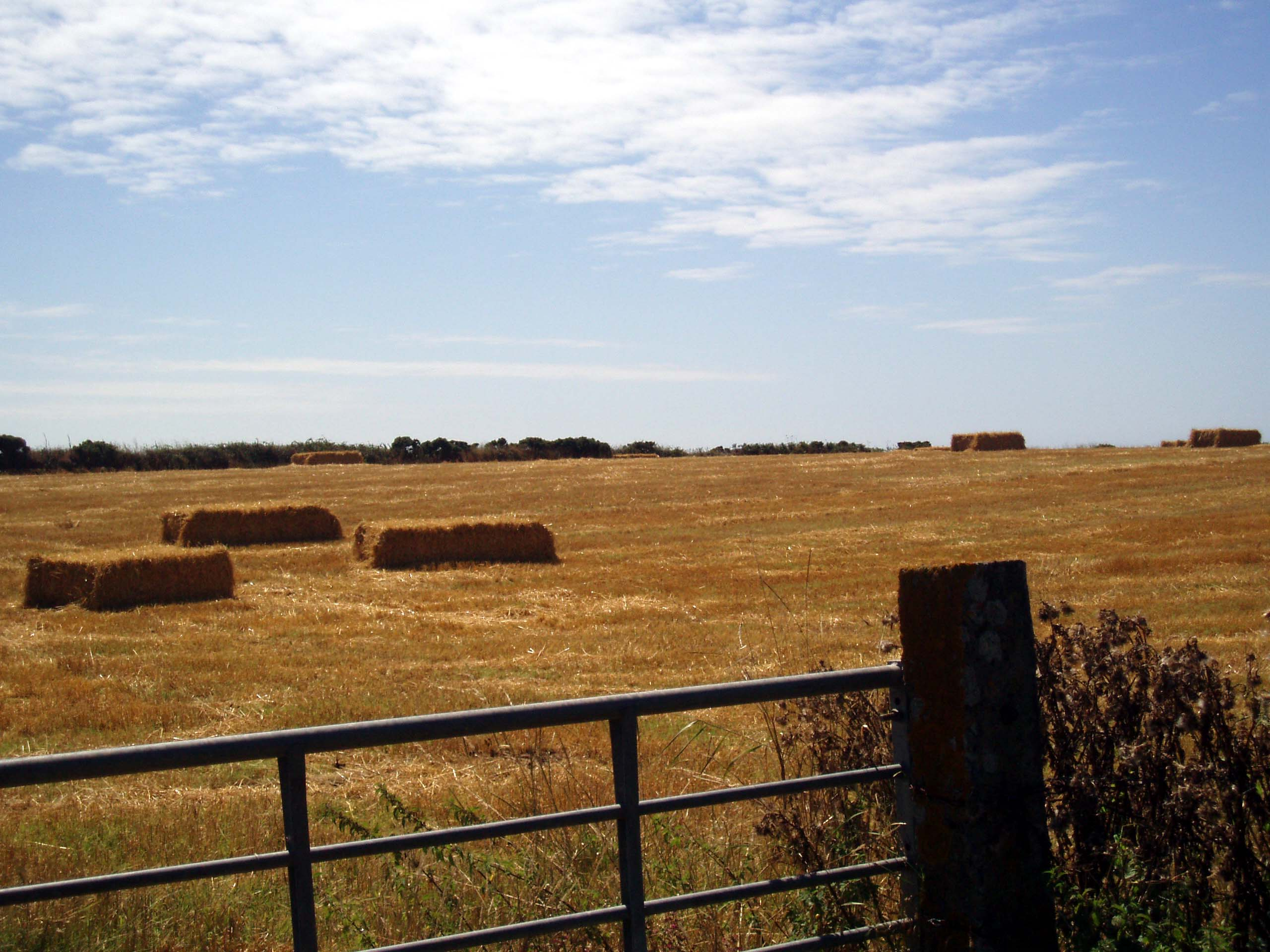
Farmland cut for hay in St Buryan parish

The major economic activity in the parish is agriculture and the parish encompasses several large farms. Most agriculture centres around dairying, with arable crops such as potato and cauliflower being farmed as well as some raising of pigs and sheep. As with much of Cornwall, fishing is an important source of income and employment. Many smaller crabbers and landline fishermen operate from the various coves and harbours on the rocky shore. Before its closure at the turn of the millennium the transatlantic telephone cable station, and telecommunications educational facility, run by Cable and Wireless at Porthcurno provided further employment opportunities in the neighbouring parish of St Levan. Its central location in west Penwith and proximity to popular tourist attractions such as the Minack Theatre, Land's End and the Blue Flag beach at Sennen Cove, mean that St Buryan enjoys a healthy income from visitors, both day trippers and those renting accommodation, during the summer months.

== Government and politics ==
In 2020 Cornwall Council announced that the neighbouring parishes of St Buryan and Paul would be abolished on 1 April 2021 with the land amalgamated to form a new parish known as St Buryan, Lamorna and Paul. The new parish has 12 councillors elected for a period of 4 years.

== Transport ==
Being one of the most westerly parishes in England, St Buryan is somewhat isolated from the rest of the UK. The village of St Buryan is situated approximately 5 miles (8.0 km) west of Penzance along the B3283 which forks about 5 miles (8.0 km) from the end of the A30, the major trunk road that runs the length of Cornwall.

Three further minor roads also meet at St Buryan, two link the village with the B3315 towards Lamorna, and the third rejoins the A30 at Crows-an-Wra. St. Buryan is served by two bus routes. Services 1 and 1A run between Penzance and Land's End via Gwavas, Sheffield, St Buryan and Sennen. These routes are run by Go Cornwall Bus. Services run frequently from Penzance to the village until around 10 pm during the summer months, but markedly less often in the winter.

Travel by rail is via the Great Western Main Line whose westernmost terminus is located at nearby Penzance. Great Western Railway provides local services to nearby St Ives via the St Ives Bay Line as well as direct connections linking Penzance with Plymouth and London Paddington. CrossCountry run services to Manchester, Edinburgh and Glasgow via Birmingham.

St Buryan's closest airports are Land's End Airport, with flights to the Isles of Scilly, and Newquay which has flights to Gatwick and Stansted.

== Amenities ==
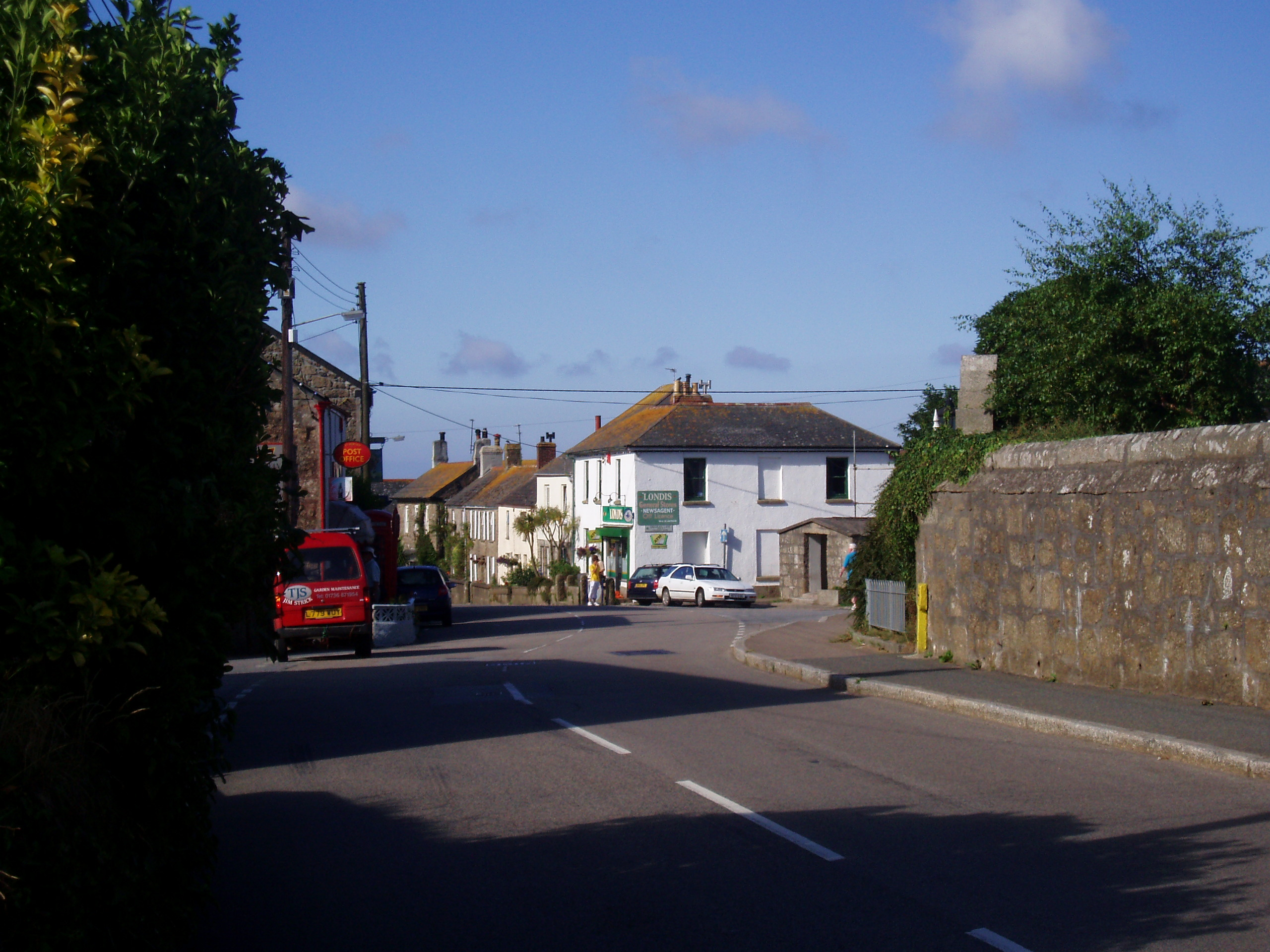
Churchtown in St Buryan with a view of the village shop

Commercial activity in St Buryan centres around Churchtown where a well stocked village store, run under a Londis franchise and housing an ATM cashpoint, plus a post office, an antiques shop and the St Buryan Inn are located. There is also a garage at the eastern end of the village that runs a limited coach service. St Buryan Farm Shop, on the outskirts of the village between St Buryan and Crows an Wra opened in August 2018 providing home grown Vegetables, home reared and local meats in the butchery counter, pasties and other baked good made on site, there is also a café area and children's play area onsite with large off-road parking area.

The village was also previously served by its own butchers shop, this was closed in 1990 due to combination of the economic recession and pressure from the recently opened Safeway (now Morrisons) supermarket in nearby Penzance. A doctor's branch surgery is currently held in the village cricket pavilion every Thursday between twelve noon and one pm. At other times patients must travel to the surgery in nearby St Just, the West Cornwall hospital in Penzance or the Royal Cornwall Hospital, Truro.

== Notable people ==
- William Noy (1577–1634), an English jurist.
- Jethro (1948–2021), real name Geoffrey McIntyre Rowe, was a British stand-up comedian and singer
- Graham Fitkin (born 1963), composer, pianist and conductor of the minimalist and postminimalist genres.

== See also ==
- Charter of St Buryan
