= Jethro (comedian) =

Cornish comedian and singer (1948–2021)

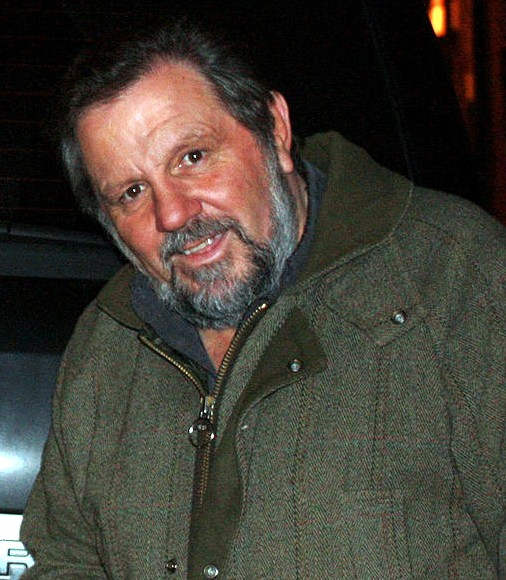
- Jethro at the Little Theatre in Retford, Nottinghamshire, 2008
- Born: Geoffrey McIntyre Rowe; 8 March 1948; St Buryan, Cornwall, England
- Died: 14 December 2021 (aged 73); Plymouth, Devon, England
- Occupations: Comedian, singer
- Years active: 1970s–2020

Geoffrey McIntyre Rowe (8 March 1948 – 14 December 2021), known by his stage name Jethro, was a Cornish stand-up comedian and singer.

== Early life ==
Rowe was born in St Buryan, Cornwall, on 8 March 1948, the only son of a farmer. After leaving school, he apprenticed as a carpenter and worked in a tin mine near Trewellard. His father, Hugh, founded the St Buryan Male Voice Choir, and Jethro made his first stage appearances with the St Just District Operatic Society in St Just as a bass singer.

== Career ==
Rowe started touring pubs and clubs in Cornwall, singing traditional songs. One night, he ran out of voice and could not sing any more, so he told a joke instead. It was well received, and so he began developing his comedy act. His gags included misogyny, bodily functions, and jokes about genitalia, which always went down well in the working men's clubs and stag parties. This changed little when he started theatre tours, with fellow comedian Dawn French describing him as "gloriously un-PC".

From 1967 he also played rugby as a prop forward in over 100 matches for Penzance and Newlyn RFC, a team that later became the Cornish Pirates. It was here that Geoff Rowe acquired the name "Jethro", influenced by the character of Jethro Bodine in the American television sitcom The Beverly Hillbillies.

After his popularity grew in Cornwall and Devon through the 1970s and 1980s, Rowe made his first national television performance in 1990 on the Des O'Connor Show, making several subsequent appearances. He also appeared five times on Jim Davidson's The Generation Game show, twice giving a demonstration of how to make a Cornish pasty, and on regional television, though much of his material was considered unsuitable for a television audience. He produced his first video, A Portion of Jethro, in 1993, followed by several others. He also claimed that, during the height of his popularity, he sold some 250,000 theatre seats a year. In 2001, he appeared in a Royal Variety Performance.

His best known routine was "This Train Don't Stop Camborne Wednesdays", partly because it was one of the few that could be performed in polite society, and therefore was aired more on the television. On the news of his death, Great Western Railway posted a tribute to him on the platform of Camborne station.

In February 2020, Rowe announced that he was retiring from public performances at the end of the year; the final shows were later postponed due to the COVID-19 pandemic.

== Style ==
Jethro's standup act made use of his strong Cornish accent and rural style of dress, with a "no-holds barred, foul-mouthed and sexually explicit routine". He was sometimes criticised for incorporating racism, sexism, and homophobia into his act. Comedian Richard Herring noted that Jethro's success over a long career was admirable, but also stated, "Part of my admiration is that his stuff isn't as horrible as that of some of his contemporaries. Which is a bit of a negative positive."

== Personal life and death ==
Rowe spent his later years living in Lewdown, where he bred horses and owned a comedy club, which closed in 2012. In 1995, he walked from Land's End to Lewdown and raised £20,000 for the Bristol Cancer Open Scanner Appeal.

He said that "Jethro" and "Geoff Rowe" were two entirely different people, and described himself as "a total recluse" off the stage, embarrassed when people recognised him in the street.

He died in Plymouth on 14 December 2021, at the age of 73. Jethro had been fighting lymphoma for the previous two years, and subsequently contracted COVID-19 in the time leading up to his death. A funeral was held at Truro Cathedral on 3 January 2022.

He is survived by his long-term partner, Jennie Barriball, and his two sons, Jesse and Lanyon. Rowe left an estate worth £3.3 million in his will, with most bequeathed to Barriball, including his home near Okehampton, another property in nearby Lifton, plus £250,000 in cash. A total of £20,000 worth of Premium Bonds was shared equally among his three grandchildren, and the remainder of his estate went to his two sons. His number plate J35 TER sold for £30,500 at auction.
