= Buriana =

6th-century Irish saint

Saint Buriana
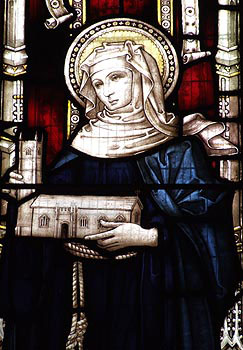
- Stained glass window of Buriana, from St Buryan's Church
- Born: 6th century Ireland
- Died: 6th century St Buryan, Cornwall
- Venerated in: Eastern Orthodox Church; Anglican Church; Roman Catholic Church
- Major shrine: St Buryan's Church, Cornwall
- Feast: 1 May (Church of England), 4 June (Catholic Church)

Buriana, also known as Berriona, Beriana, Bruinseach, Buryan, Beryan, or Berion was a 6th-century Irish saint, a hermit in St Buryan, near Penzance, Cornwall. Baring-Gould identifies her with the Irish saint Bruinsech.

== Life ==
She is said to have been the daughter of an Irish king and travelled to Cornwall from Ireland in a coracle as a missionary to convert the local people to Christianity. According to the Exeter Calendar of Martyrology, Buriana was the daughter of a Munster chieftain. One legend tells how she cured the paralysed son of King Geraint of Dumnonia. Buriana ministered from a chapel on the site of the parish church at St Buryan.

== Veneration ==
The parish church of St Buryan, St Buryan's Church, is her primary patronage. Despite her official feast being on 1 May (recorded in the Exeter Martyrology), the parish church of St Buryan celebrates her feast on the Sunday nearest 13 May, in accordance with the old May Day of the Julian calendar. In the Roman calendar of saints, her feast is kept on 4 June.
