= Tregurnow =

Village in Cornwall, England

Coordinates: 50°03′44″N 5°34′28″W

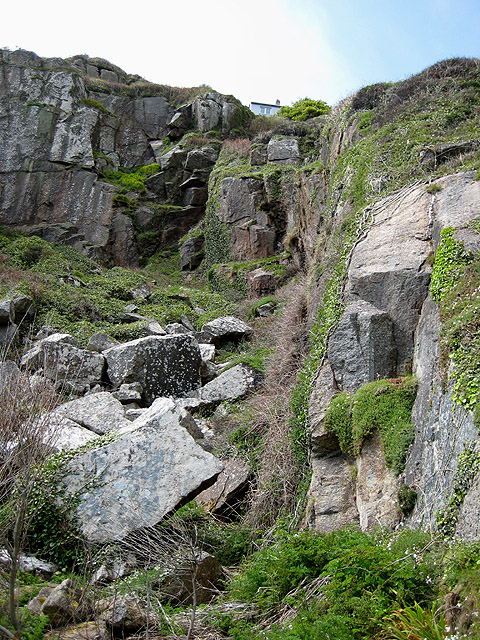
Tregurnow Cliff

Tregurnow is a settlement in St Buryan civil parish on the Penwith peninsula in Cornwall, England, United Kingdom.

At Tregurnow farm is an interesting Celtic cross from the medieval period similar to ones found on the Isle of Man. Tregurnow also gives its name to the site of a stone circle that previously stood in the area at grid reference SW 43818 24523 and the cliffs above Lamorna Cove also bear the same name.
