= Veor Cove =

Beach and cove in Cornwall, England

Coordinates: 50.19392°N 5.58258°W

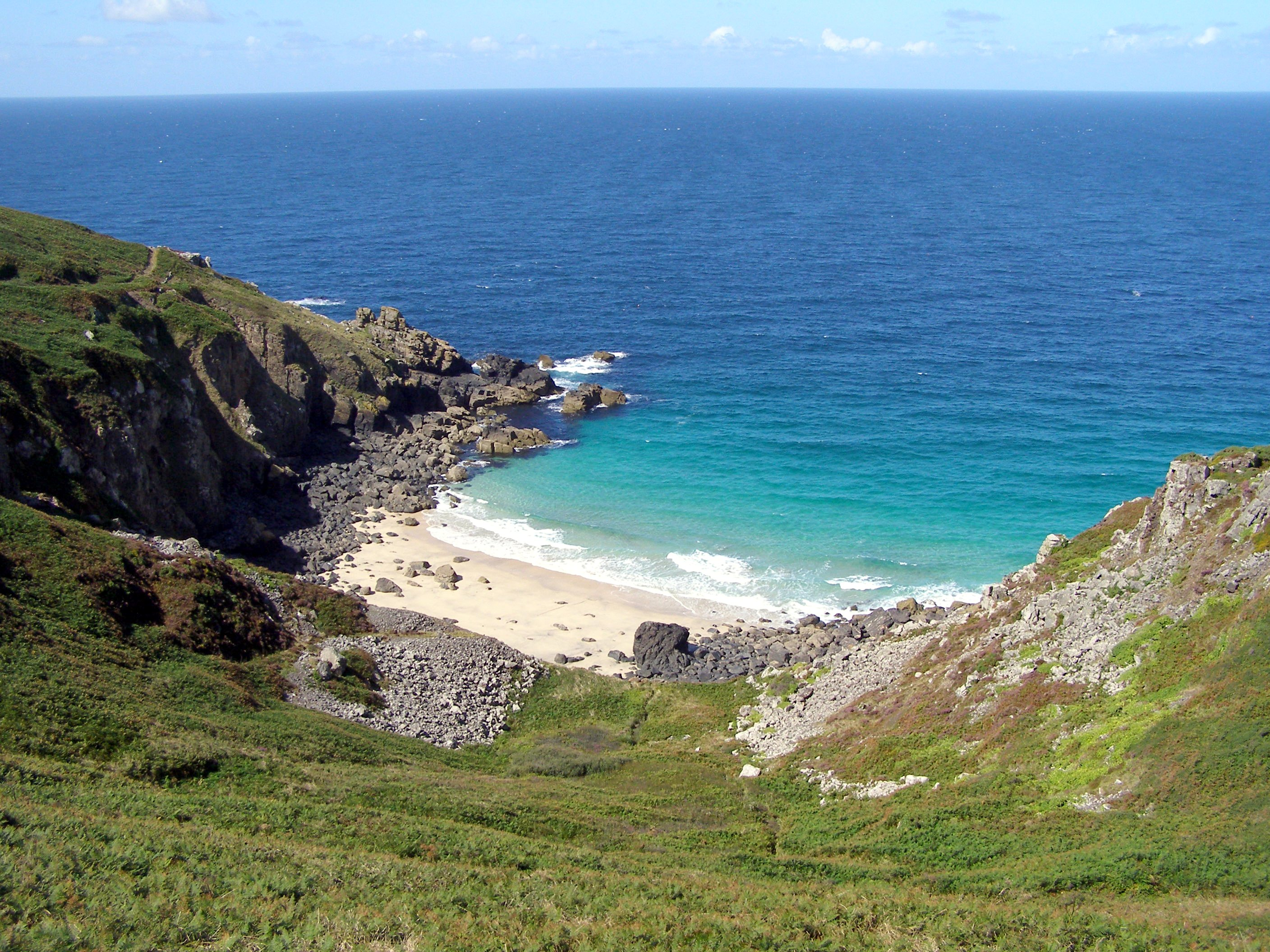
Veor Cove from the coastal path on Carnelloe Cliff

Veor Cove (grid reference SW444388) is a beach in Cornwall, UK. It is about 1 mile (1.6 km) northwest of the village of Zennor, and immediately to the west of Pendour Cove.

The name of this cove is from the Cornish 'veor' meaning large or great.

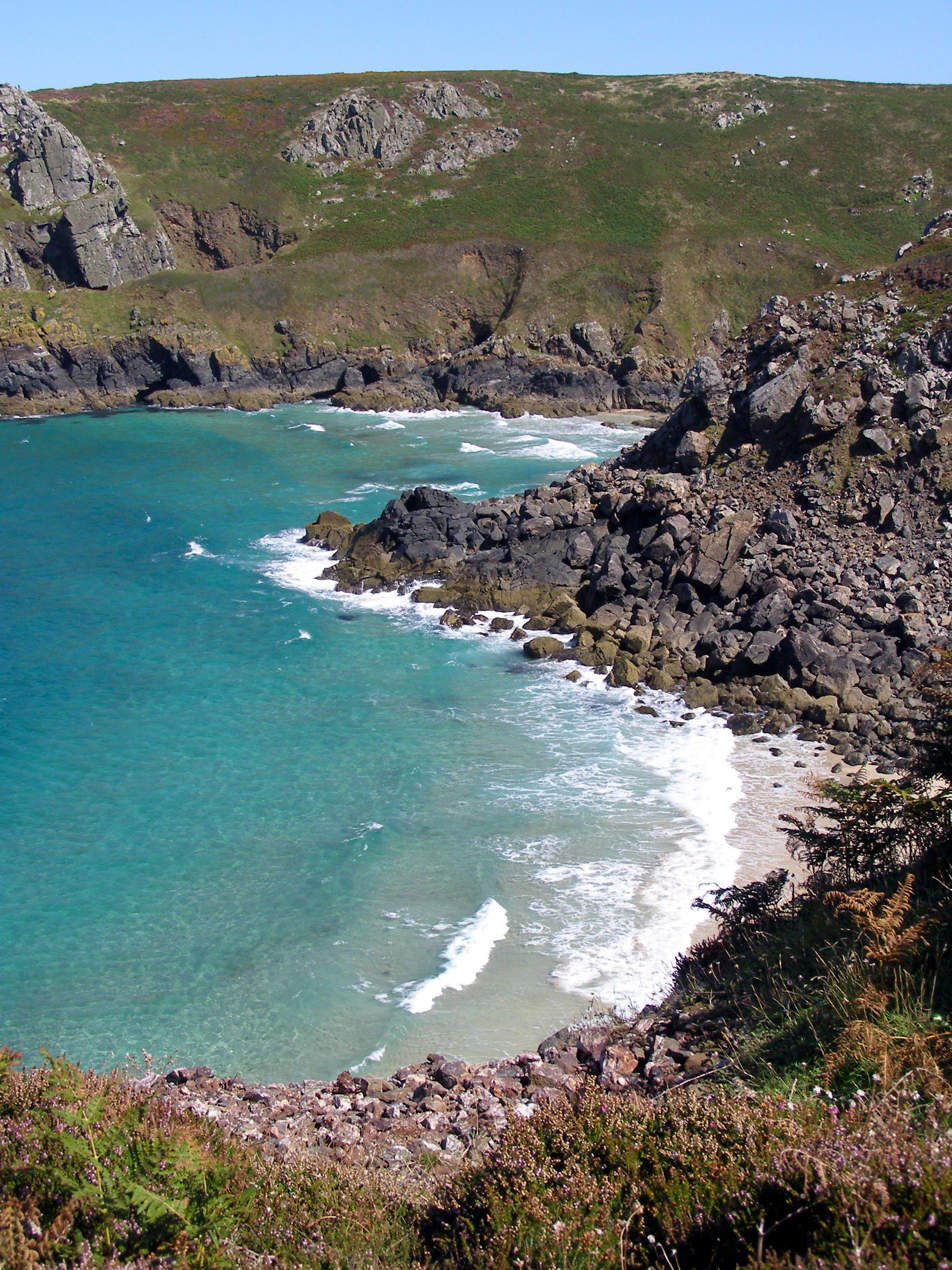
Veor Cove from the west
