= Sparnon =

Hamlet in Cornwall, England

Coordinates: 50.0598°N 5.6363°W

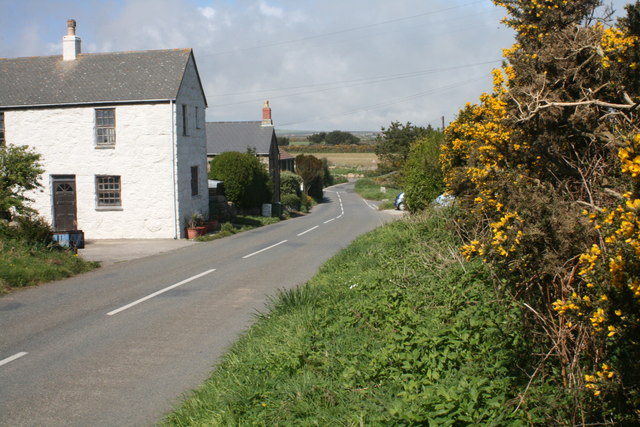
Sparnon

Sparnon (Cornish: Spernen, meaning thorn tree) is a small hamlet in the parish of St Buryan on the Penwith peninsula in Cornwall, England, United Kingdom.
