= Penberth =

Village in Cornwall, England

Coordinates: 50°3′N 5°38′W

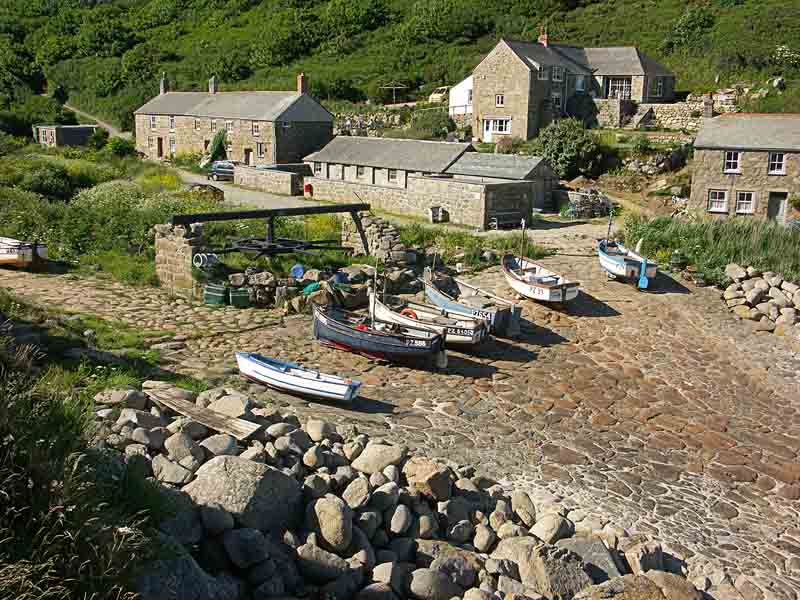
Penberth Cove

Penberth (Cornish: Benbryghi) is a valley, coastal village and cove on the Penwith peninsula in Cornwall, England. It is approximately 7 miles (11 km) southwest of Penzance. Most of the village is within the parish of St Buryan and the boundary with St Levan follows the Penberth river.

Penberth Cove was once home to a pilchard fishing industry and is one of the last remaining traditional fishing coves in Cornwall, with a handful of local fishermen still making their living from fishing for mackerel, lobster and crab. There was also a cut flower industry, the produce being sent to London via train from Penzance.

The pilchards caught at Penberth Cove were pressed on site for their oil and to preserve them in the Big Cellar at the back of the cove.

Penberth's first regatta was held on Saturday, 27 August 1881. There were races for 20 feet (6.1 m) and 18 feet (5.5 m) boats to the Runnel Stone and back, rowing races for 4-oared ″crabbers″, sculling races for punts, a 400 yards (370 m) swimming race and the greasy pole contest with a leg of mutton dangling from the top. There was also a duck hunt, where three birds ″were flung″; one of the birds was difficult to catch and was allowed to escape. Music was provided by the Buryan Artillery Volunteers.

The local community radio station is Coast FM (formerly Penwith Radio), which broadcasts on 96.5 and 97.2 FM.
