= Crows-an-Wra =

Hamlet in west Cornwall, England

Coordinates: 50.091375°N 5.641588°W

Crows-an-Wra: Cornish: Krows an Wragh
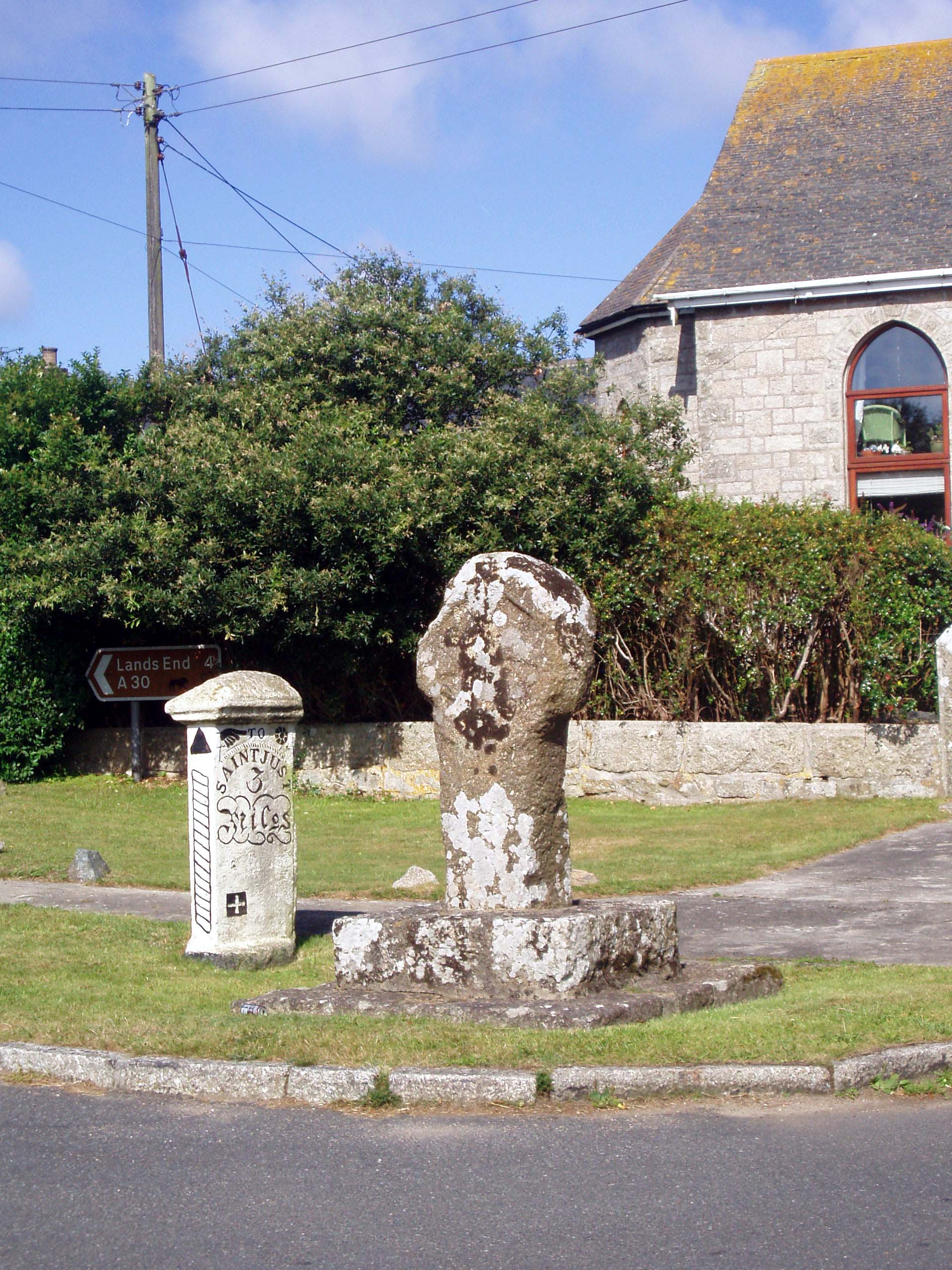
- Celtic cross at Crows-an-Wra junction

- Location within Cornwall
- OS grid reference: SW 3954 2760
- Civil parish: St Buryan, Lamorna and Paul
- Unitary authority: Cornwall
- Ceremonial county: Cornwall
- Region: South West
- Country: England
- Sovereign state: United Kingdom

Crows-an-Wra (Cornish: Krows an Wragh, meaning the witch's cross) is a hamlet in West Cornwall, England, United Kingdom. It is situated in the civil parish of St Buryan, Lamorna and Paul approximately four miles (6 km) northeast of Land's End.

== History and description ==
The hamlet consists of a cluster of 13 houses along the A30 road, the oldest being the Grade II listed Haydon Cottage and other more distant dwellings including those at Boscarne and the hamlet of Rissick. Haydon Cottage was built in the 17th century; blacksmith William Haydon was born here in 1625 and died in London in 1666 in the Great Fire of London. The hamlet developed with the local mines of West Wheal Rissick, Wheal Lovell, and West Wheal Margaret, which in the mid-19th century produced high grade tin. The mines subsequently closed and a china clay works lies nearby.

The name Crows-an-Wra translates from the Cornish as "witches cross", and there is evidence that the site was important in Neolithic times, as well as a pre-Conquest Celtic cross and a holy well. The hamlet once had its own Methodist chapel built 1904 replacing an earlier chapel of 1832, but the 1904 chapel had long since fallen into disuse and was converted into a house in 1983.

The composer Graham Fitkin was born here.
