= Treen Cliff =

Site of Special Scientific Interest on the Penwith Peninsula in Cornwall, England

- Site of Special Scientific Interest
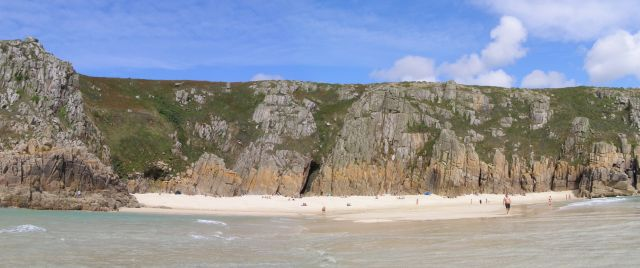

- Location within Southwest Cornwall
- Location of Treen Cliff.
- Area of search: Cornwall
- Grid reference: SW395224
- Coordinates: 50.0451°N 5.6392°W
- Interest: Biological
- Area: 49.3 hectares (0.493 km^{2}; 0.190 sq mi)
- Notification date: 1951

Treen Cliff is a Site of Special Scientific Interest (SSSI) located on the Penwith Peninsula in Cornwall, England, UK, 6 miles (9.7 km) south-west of Penzance. First notified in 1951, with a revision in 1973, and a further notification on 1 July 1986, it is 49.3 hectares (122 acres) in area, stretching from grid reference SW387220 to SW402225. Designated for both for its biological and geological interest, part of the site, Treryn Dinas, is a Scheduled Ancient Monument consisting of a "cliff castle" with four ramparts and ditches and the Logan Rock. It is within the Cornwall Area of Outstanding Natural Beauty (AONB), the Penwith Heritage Coast and is part owned and managed by the National Trust.

== Description ==
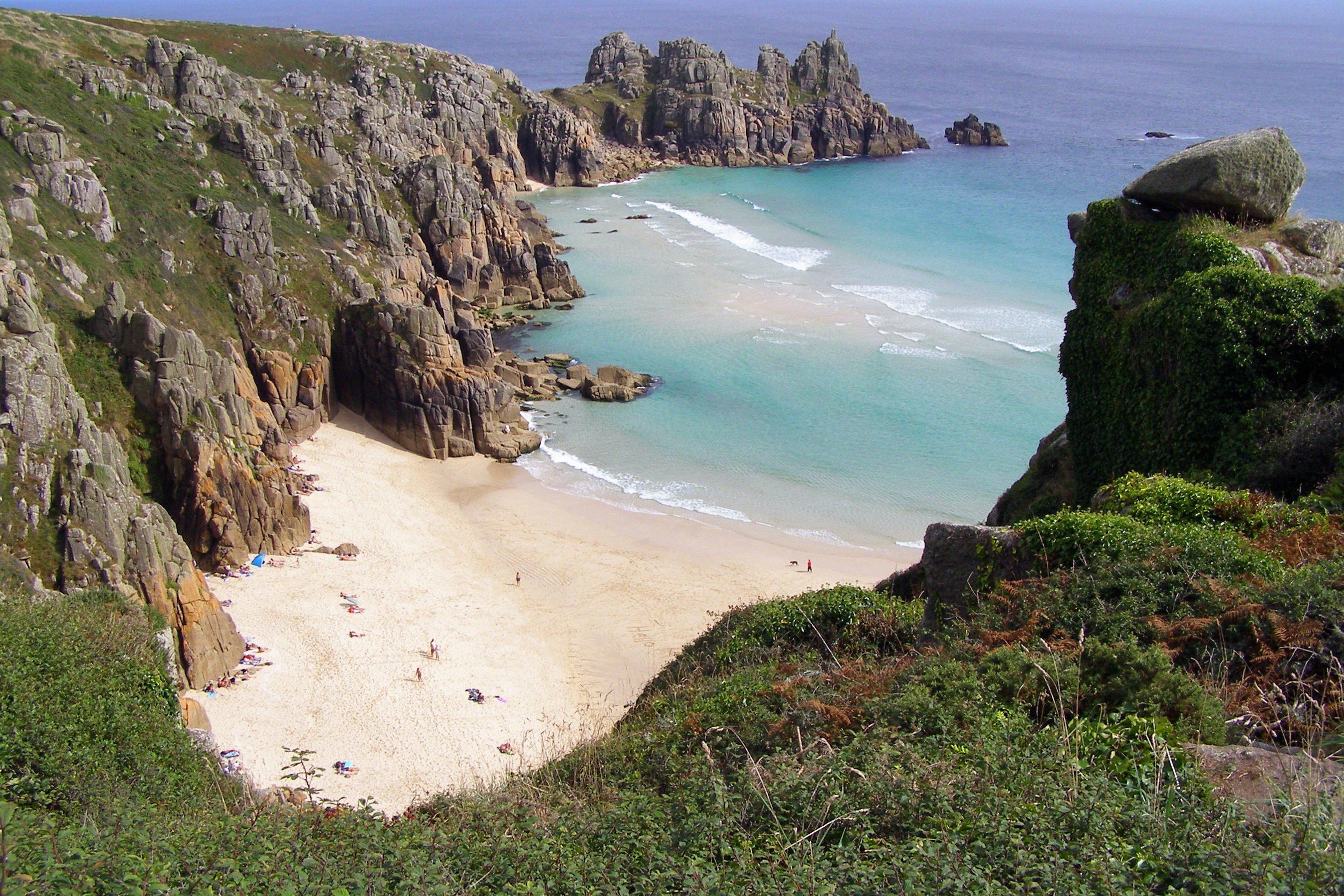
Pednvounder beach from Treen Cliff

The SSSI extends from Porthcurno beach in the west to Penberth Cove in the east. Several rare plant species occur and the site is of particular importance for its maritime heath. At the last site assessment on 12 August 2010, the SSSI was described as ″Unfavourable recovering″ because scrub and bracken (Pteridium aquilinum) encroachment are diminishing the interest, and the site needs to be grazed. Removal of sycamore (Acer pseudoplatanus) would enhance the site as well as the control of other invasive species. Maritime cliff habitat types, National Vegetation Classification, (NVC) MC1 and MC5 need to be added to the notifiable features.

== Biological interest ==
=== Plant communities ===
The main habitats are maritime heath and maritime grassland, heath, scrub, flush and deciduous woodland. The maritime heath is dominated by heather (Calluna vulgaris), bell heather (Erica cinerea) and western gorse (Ulex gallii). Maritime grassland occurs on the steeper cliff slopes and is dominated by red fescue (Festuca rubra), with spring squill (Scilla verna), wild carrot (Daucus carota), kidney vetch (Anthyllis vulneraria) and sea plantain (Plantago maritima). The Red Data Book western clover (Trifolium occidentale) and the nationally rare hare's foot clover (Trifolium arvense) grow here as well as hairy bird's-foot trefoil (Lotus subbiflorus) and bird's-foot fenugreek (Trifolium ornithopodioides). Large areas are covered by scrub, dominated by gorse (Ulex europaeus) and blackthorn (Prunus spinosa) and provide habitat for invertebrates and birds. Common dodder (Cuscuta epithymum) parasitises the gorse. A number of wet flushes occur along the coast dominated by common reed (Phragmites australis). A small area of woodland dominated by elm (Ulmus glabra) and sycamore has developed on abandoned horticultural plots.

A description by Jean Lawman sums up the area eloquently:

Also in June, many of the cliffs are bright with Oxeye Daisies Leucanthemum vulgare and they are particularly abundant around Logan Rock and Porth Curnow area where they mix with foxgloves and button like, mauve Sheepsbit Jasione montana. The spectacle of all these flowers strewn along the cliff edge, with the classically beautiful Pednevounder beach below and the rugged headland of Treryn Dinas in the distance, must be one of the loveliest in Cornwall.

Rock sea lavender (Limonium loganicum) is an endemic plant that is found only along this part of the coast from Carn Les Boel to the Logan Rock. all the colonies are within a SSSI but may be vulnerable from climbers or walkers on the lower slopes where it occurs.

=== Invertebrates ===
A nationally rare invertebrate, the weevil Anthonomus rufus, occurs on the cliffs and is associated with blackthorn the larvae almost certainly in the flower buds. Formerly widespread in coastal Britain, now localised. There are butterfly colonies of the silver-studded blue (Plebejus argus), small pearl-bordered fritillary (Boloria selene) on Cribba Head in the eastern part of the site as well as the thrift clearwing (Synansphecia muscaeformis) a day–flying moth.

== See also ==
- Treen (St Levan)
- List of Sites of Special Scientific Interest in Cornwall
