= Abermawr =

Coastline in Pembrokeshire, Wales

Coordinates: 51.96944°N 5.08530°W

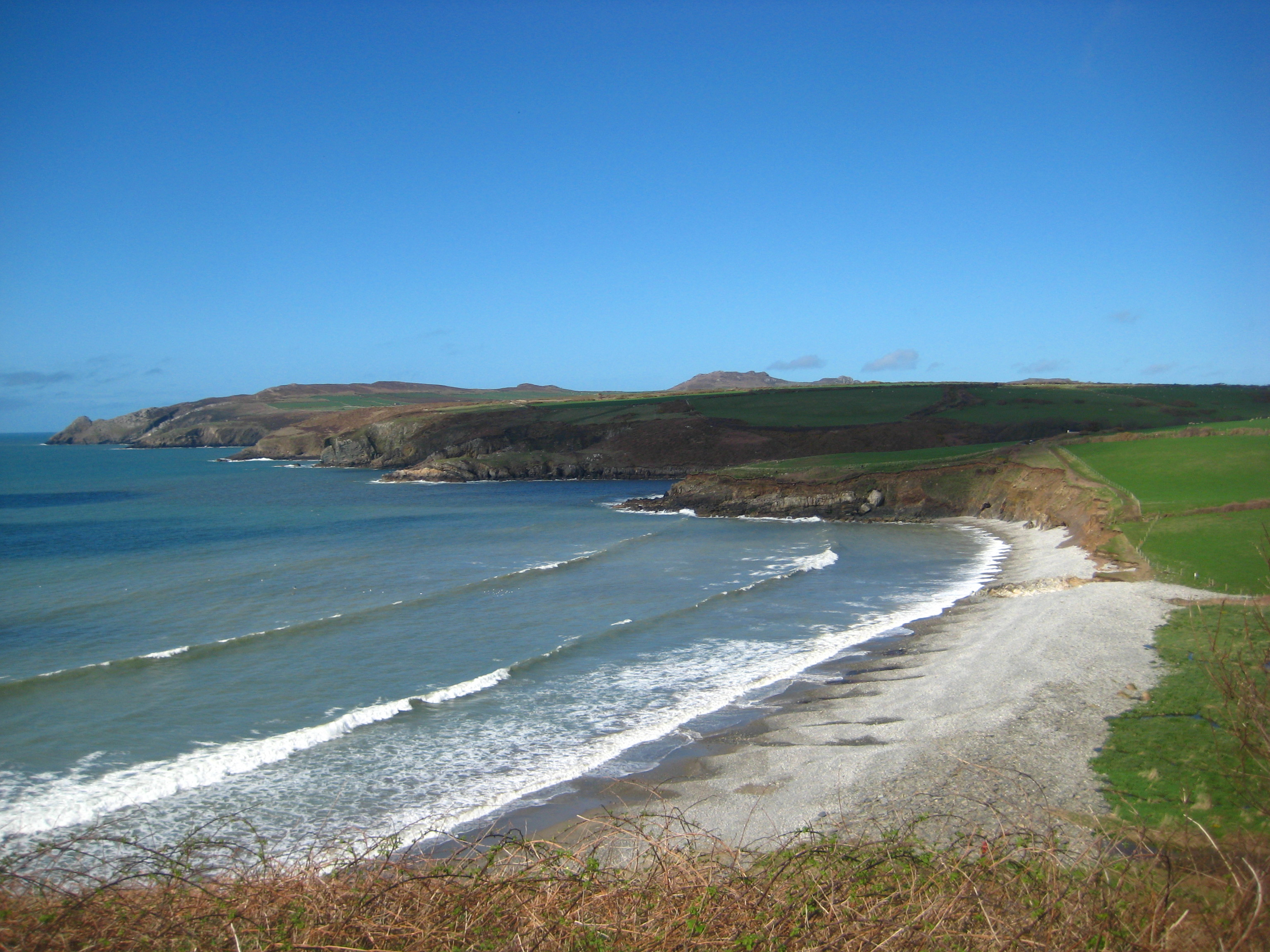
- Aber Mawr rocks looking towards Aber Bach

- Location within Pembrokeshire
- Principal area: Pembrokeshire
- Country: Wales
- Sovereign state: United Kingdom
- Police: Dyfed-Powys
- Fire: Mid and West Wales
- Ambulance: Welsh

Abermawr is a stretch of coastline and is regarded as a Site of Special Scientific Interest in Pembrokeshire, Wales. Abermawr is a mostly shingle beach with marsh and woodland behind it. It is popular with many walkers who are walking along the coast past Porthgain, Abereiddi and Abercastle. The large pebble bank of the bay was created by a storm on 25 October 1859. The currents at Abermawr can be hazardous but the headlands are low so are less gusty.

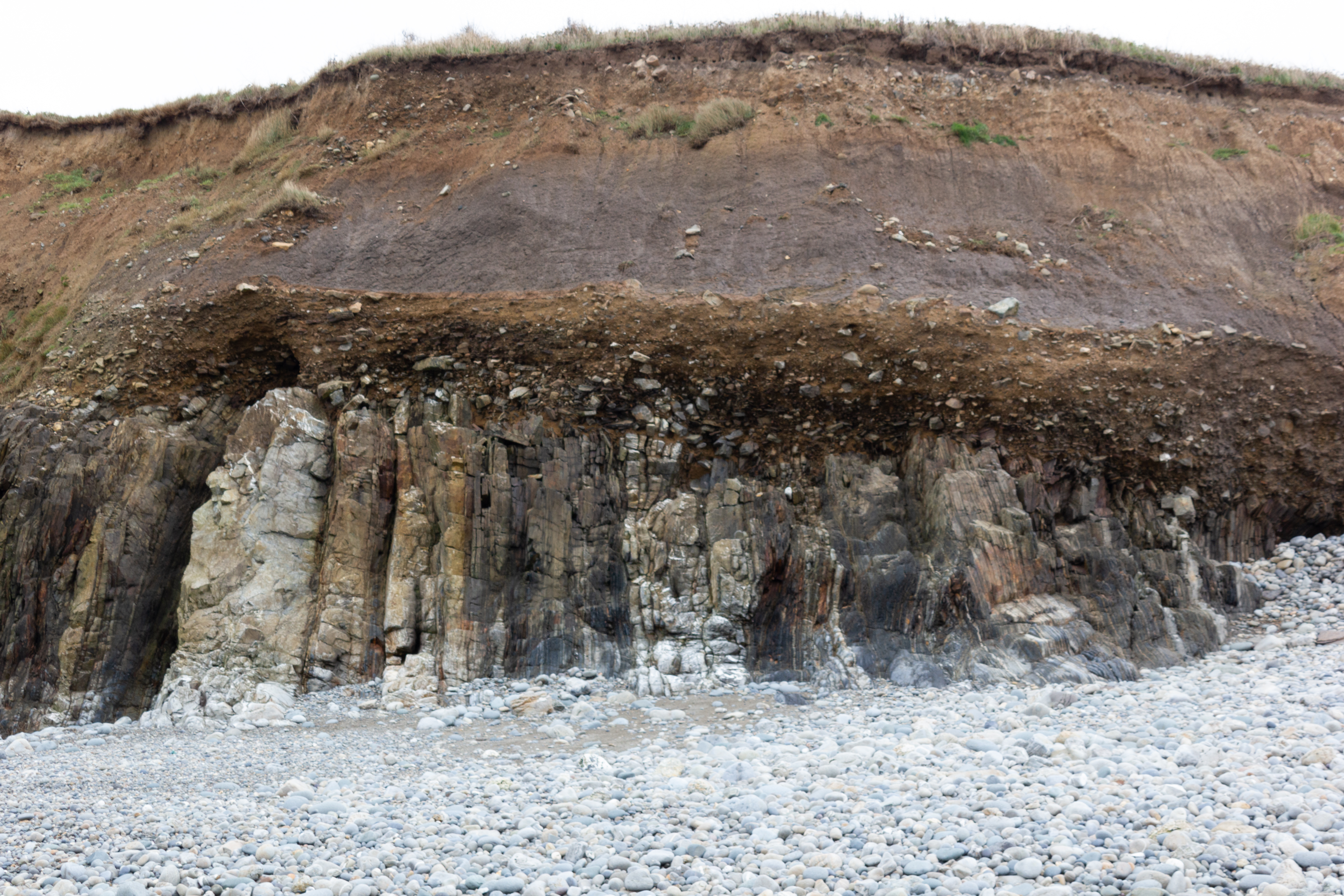
rock formation at the beach

== History ==
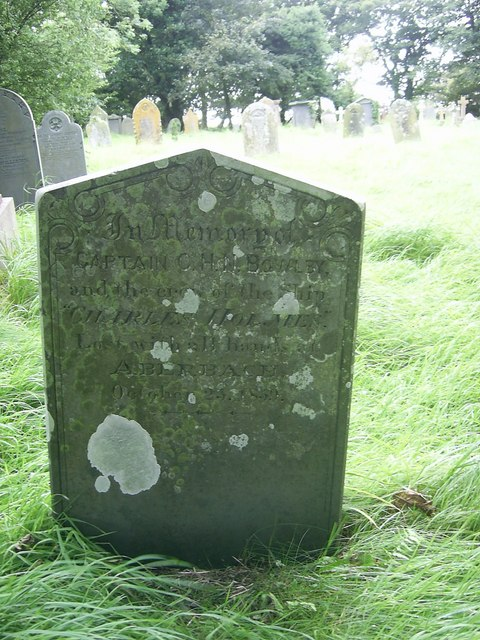
Gravestone of Captain Bowlby in Granston churchyard

During the 1840s, the South Wales Railway (SWR), led by engineer Isambard Kingdom Brunel, began to explore ways of constructing a rail link to the coast, opening up a passenger train route from London via the Great Western Railway to link with passenger ships sailing from Great Britain to Ireland and to America. In 1847 Captain Christopher Claxton surveyed the St George's Channel to try to ascertain the best route for passenger ships to cross. Abermawr was considered briefly as the SWR railway terminal, but after surveys by Brunel, the line was re-routed to terminate at Neyland instead. An Act of Parliament to abandon these works and redirect to Neyland was granted on 17 June 1862. The remains of an incomplete trackbed, abandoned in 1852, can still be seen at nearby Treffgarne.

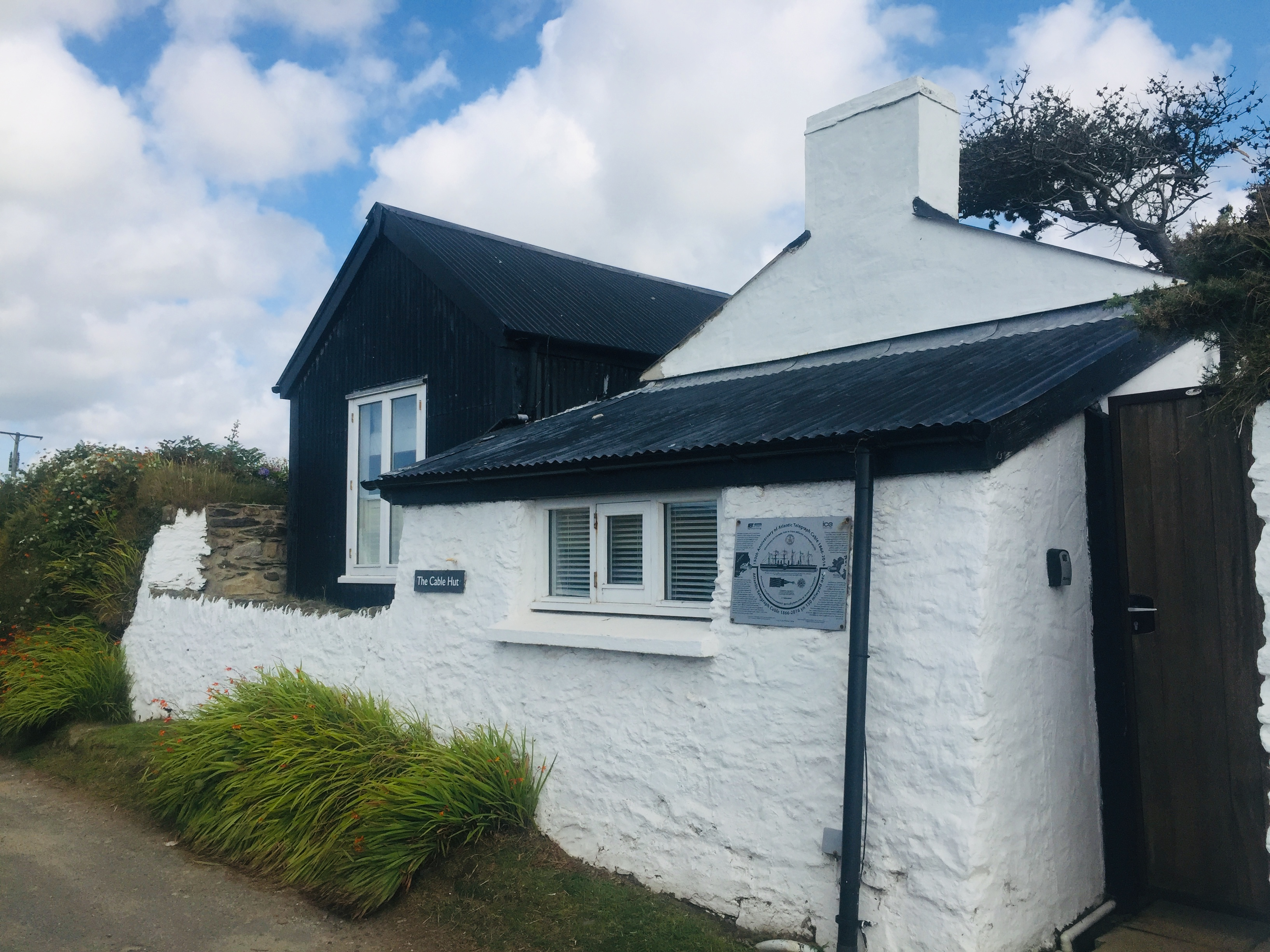
Brunel's Cable Cottage at Abermawr

On 27 July 1866 Abermawr became the eastern terminal of the Transatlantic telegraph cable when Brunel completed an ambitious scheme to lay a telegraph cable under the Atlantic Ocean. The cable was laid by Brunel's steam ship Great Eastern between Trinity Bay in Newfoundland and Valentia Island in Ireland. It then crossed Ireland via a landline before going under the Irish Sea at Wexford to re-emerge at Abermawr. Telegraph operators who were stationed in a corrugated iron hut would retransmit messages to London via the SWR and GWR telegraph wires, enabling the first ever telegraph communications between Britain and North America. A second cable was laid in 1880, this time however to Blackwater. Abermawr telegraph relay station continued in operation until 1922/3, when cables were damaged by a storm and Abermawr was abandoned. The hut still stands today and is in use as a private house.

The storm of 1859 resulted in the wreck of the ship Charles Holmes, commanded by Captain C. H. N. Bowlby. All the 28 people on board were drowned and their bodies washed up on the beaches of Aberbach and Abermawr.

During World War I the site was important in communicating with North America and was guarded by a small detachment of soldiers. However, in the early 1920s a storm damaged the site and it was abandoned. When the tide is out you can see evidence of a prehistoric forest.

== See also ==
- Porthcurno – 1870 on the submarine communications cable station
