= Pedn Vounder =

Tidal beach in Cornwall, England

Coordinates: 50.0436°N 5.6426°W

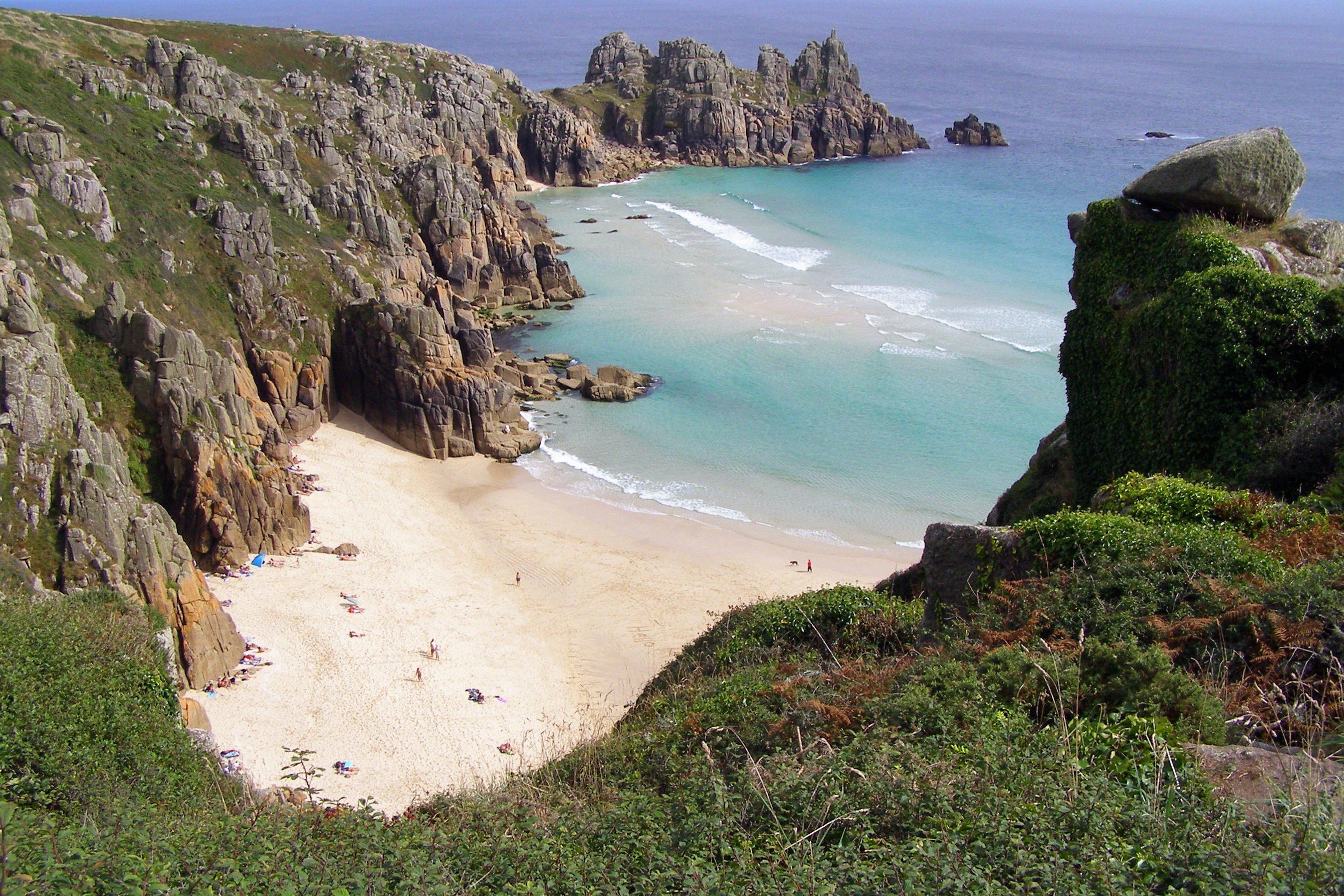
Pedn Vounder beach from Treen Cliff

Pedn Vounder (grid reference SW393223) is a tidal beach on the south coast of the Penwith Peninsula in Cornwall, England. It is immediately to the west of the Logan Rock headland, below Treen Cliff. The name is from the Late Cornish 'pedn' (head, end) and 'an vownder' (of the lane).

Access to the beach is either by boat, or on foot from the coastal path along the cliffs. The top of this path may be approached from Porthcurno, approximately 0.75 mi (1.21 km) to the west, or from Treen, approximately 0.62 mi (1.00 km) to the north. The final stage of the descent from the coastal path requires some climbing down steep rocks at the western end of the beach. It is sometimes possible to walk from Porthcurno beach along the shore, during low water of a spring tide. In common with some of the other secluded coves on the Penwith peninsula, this beach is an unofficial naturist beach. Signs on the cliff above the beach warn that swimming off the far side of the sand bar is dangerous due to strong currents.

In 1880, a wooden hut was built above the beach to house a submarine communications cable from Brest, France. It connected with a land line running via the Trereen valley, and by Burnewhall to Sheffield and on to Newlyn and Penzance. At this time Porthcurno was known world-wide as the British terminal of submarine telegraph cables.

== Gallery ==
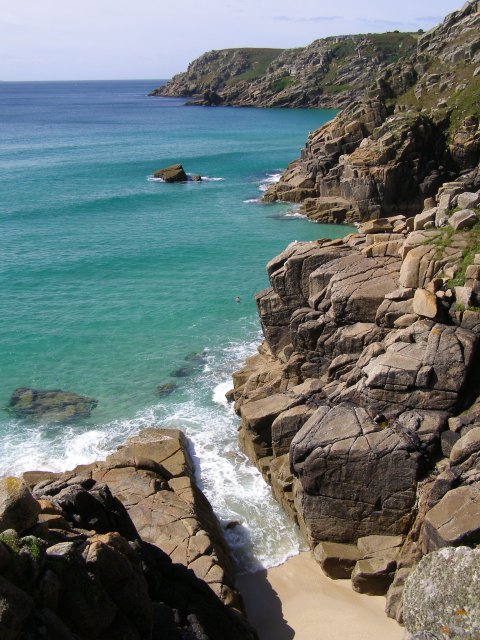
Coast at Pedn Vounder

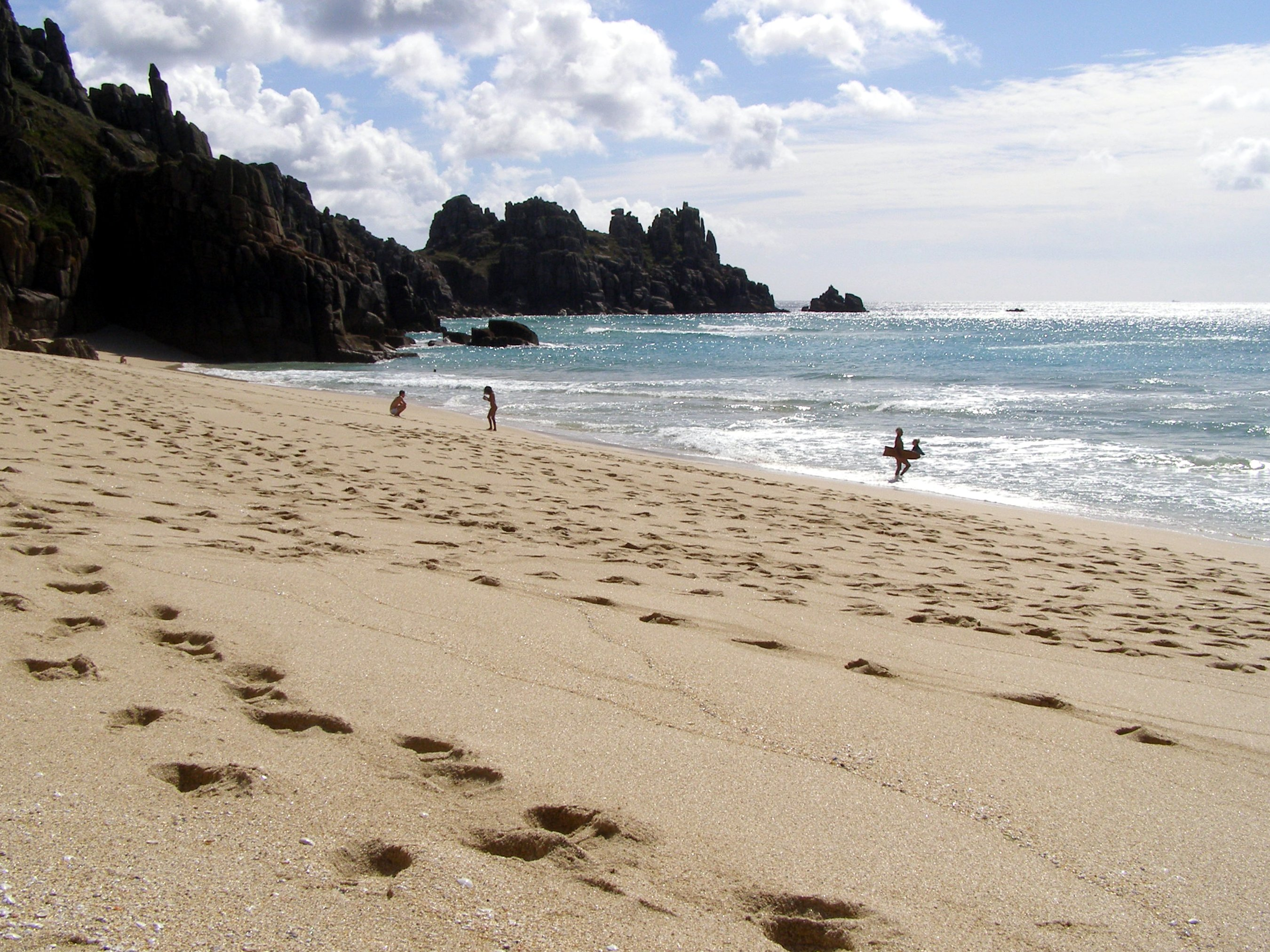
Pedn Vounder beach

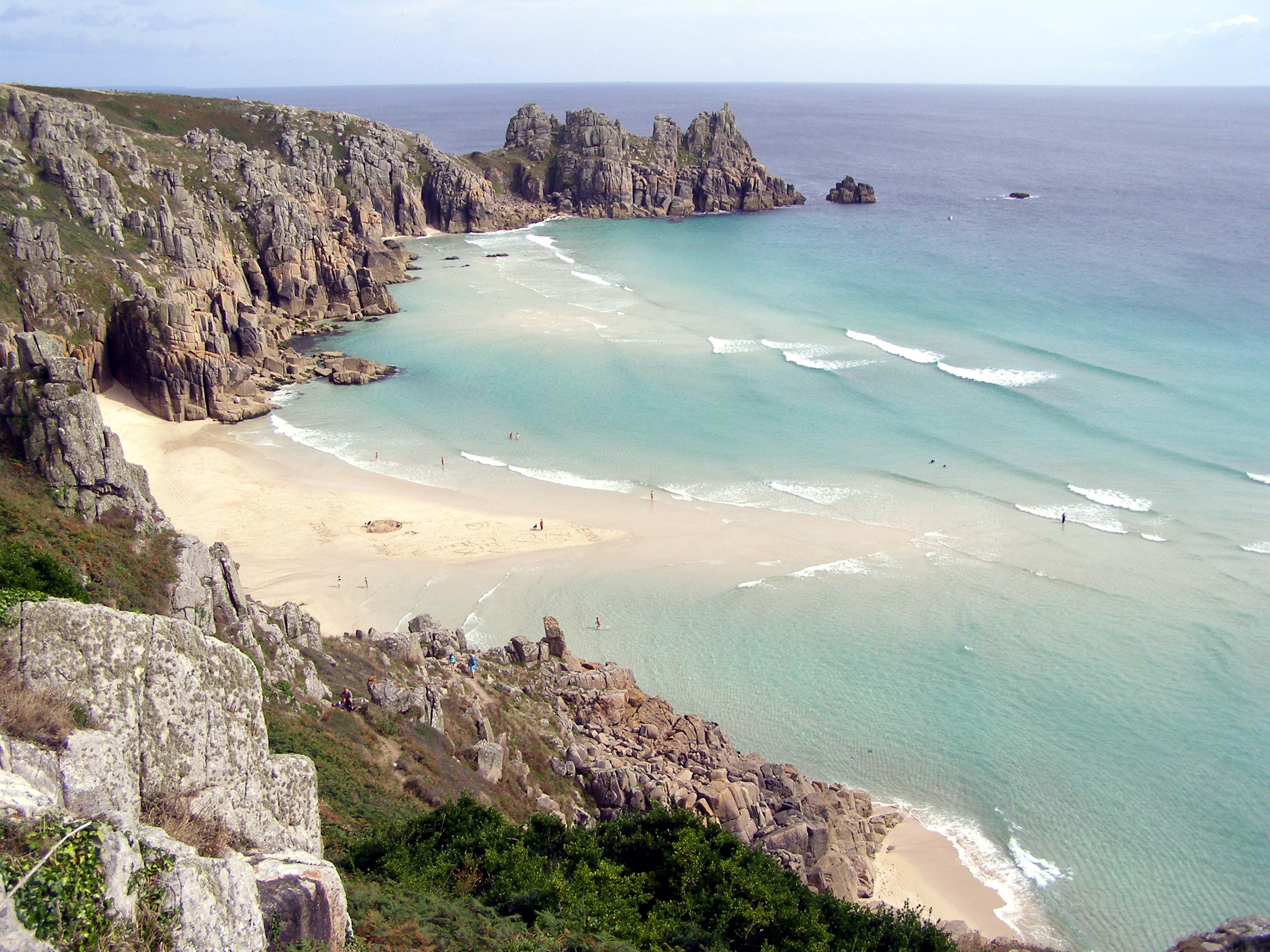
Pedn Vounder beach sand bar

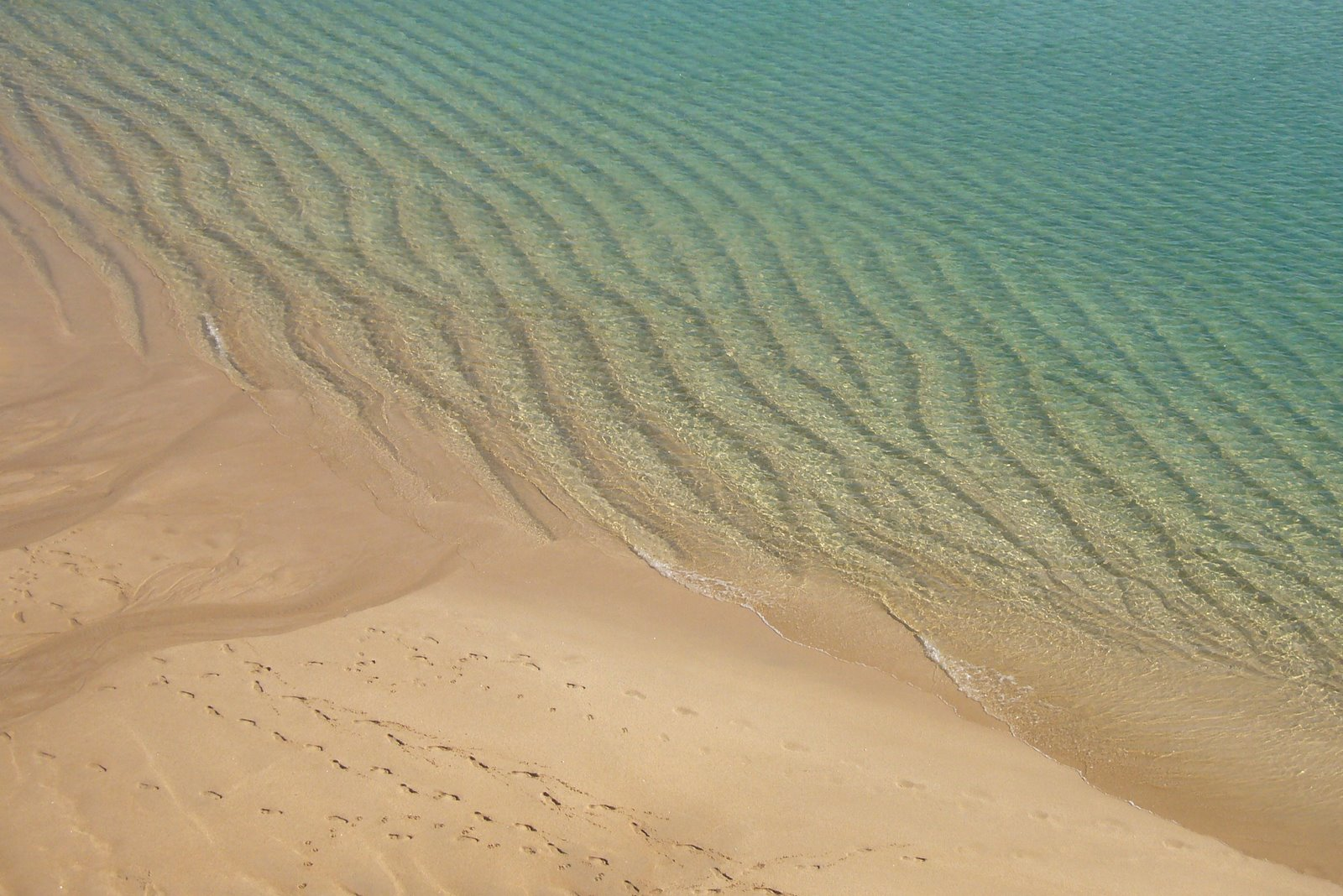
Sea at Pedn Vounder over sandbank

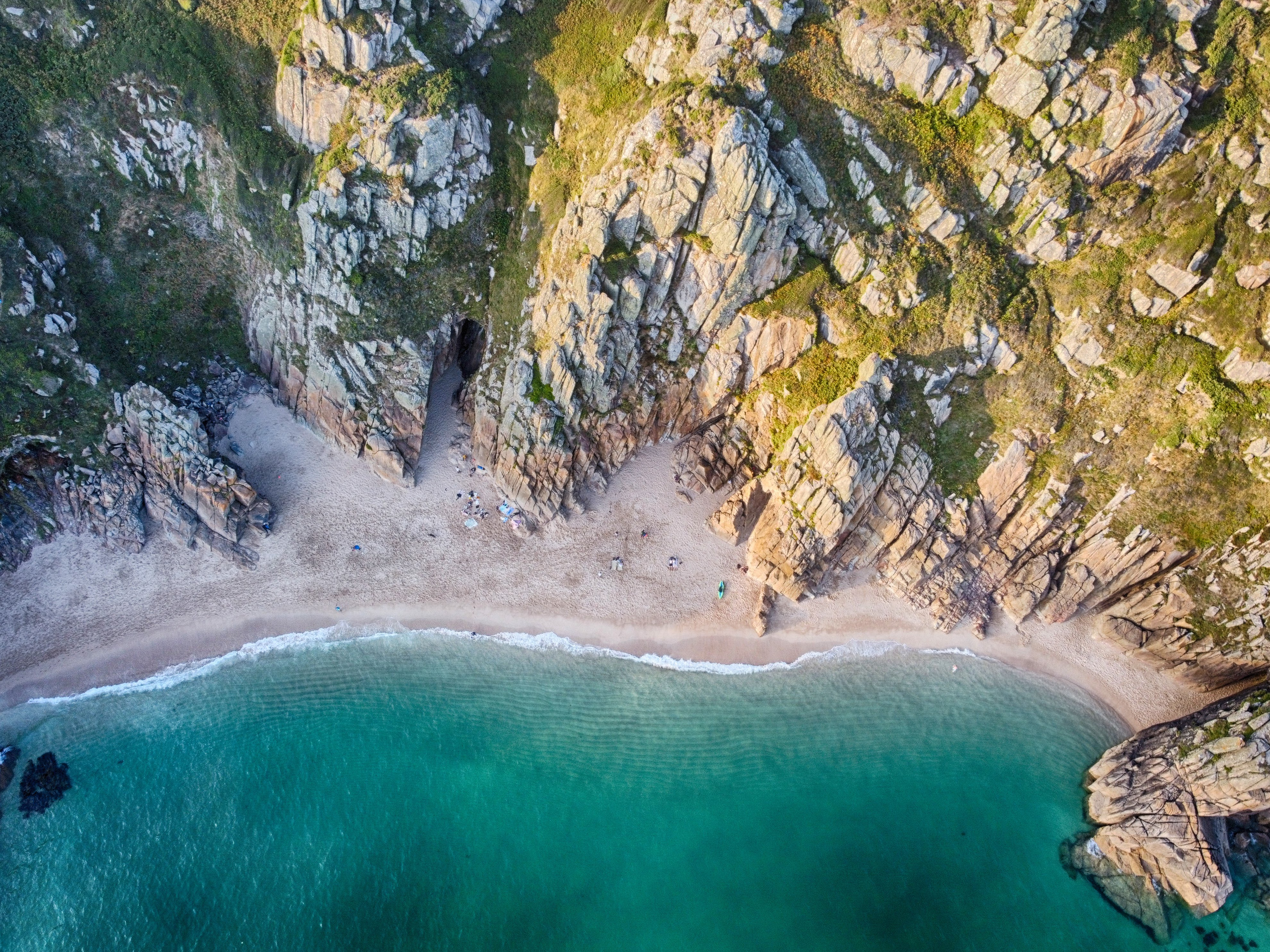
Aerial view of Pedn Vounder beach
