= Treen, St Levan =

Coordinates: 50.04975°N 5.64127°W

Treen: Cornish: Tredhin
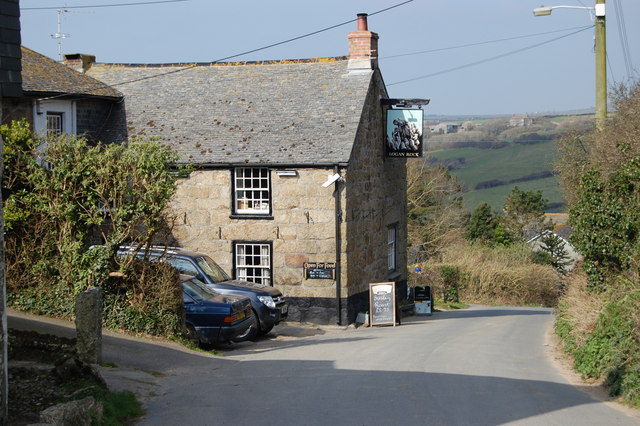

- Location within Cornwall
- OS grid reference: SW3923
- Civil parish: St Levan
- Unitary authority: Cornwall
- Ceremonial county: Cornwall
- Region: South West
- Country: England
- Sovereign state: United Kingdom
- Post town: PENZANCE
- Postcode district: TR19
- Dialling code: 01736
- Police: Devon and Cornwall
- Fire: Cornwall
- Ambulance: South Western

Treen (Cornish: Tredhin) (grid reference SW3923) is a small village in the parish of St Levan, in the far west of Cornwall, England, United Kingdom. It is about 3 miles (4.8 km) inland from Land's End on a short unclassified spur road from the B3315. Treen overlooks the Penberth Valley and sits about 1 kilometre (0.62 mi) inland from Treryn Dinas, an Iron Age promontory fort, or cliff castle, with five lines of fortification. On the headland is the Logan Rock and to the west is Pedn Vounder tidal beach, which is popular with naturists. Treen Cliff is to either side of Treryn Dinas. The village has a popular pub, The Logan Rock Inn, a village shop, cafe and campsite with views to both Logan Rock and nearby Porthcurno.

Treen lies within the Cornwall Area of Outstanding Natural Beauty (AONB). Almost a third of Cornwall has AONB designation, with the same status and protection as a National Park.

The first records of the name is Tredyn (1304) and Trethyn (1314) and means farm + fort; being near the cliff castle at the Logan Rock. A description of the village by Francis Kilvert who visited Cornwall for two weeks in 1870:

... and we came to a strange bare wild village where everything was made of granite – cottages, walls, roofs, pigs "crows" (sties), sheds, outbuildings, nothing but granite, enormous slabs of granite set up on end and roofed with other slabs.

This village should not be confused with the hamlet of Treen, in Zennor parish on the north coast, above Gurnard's Head.

== Gallery ==
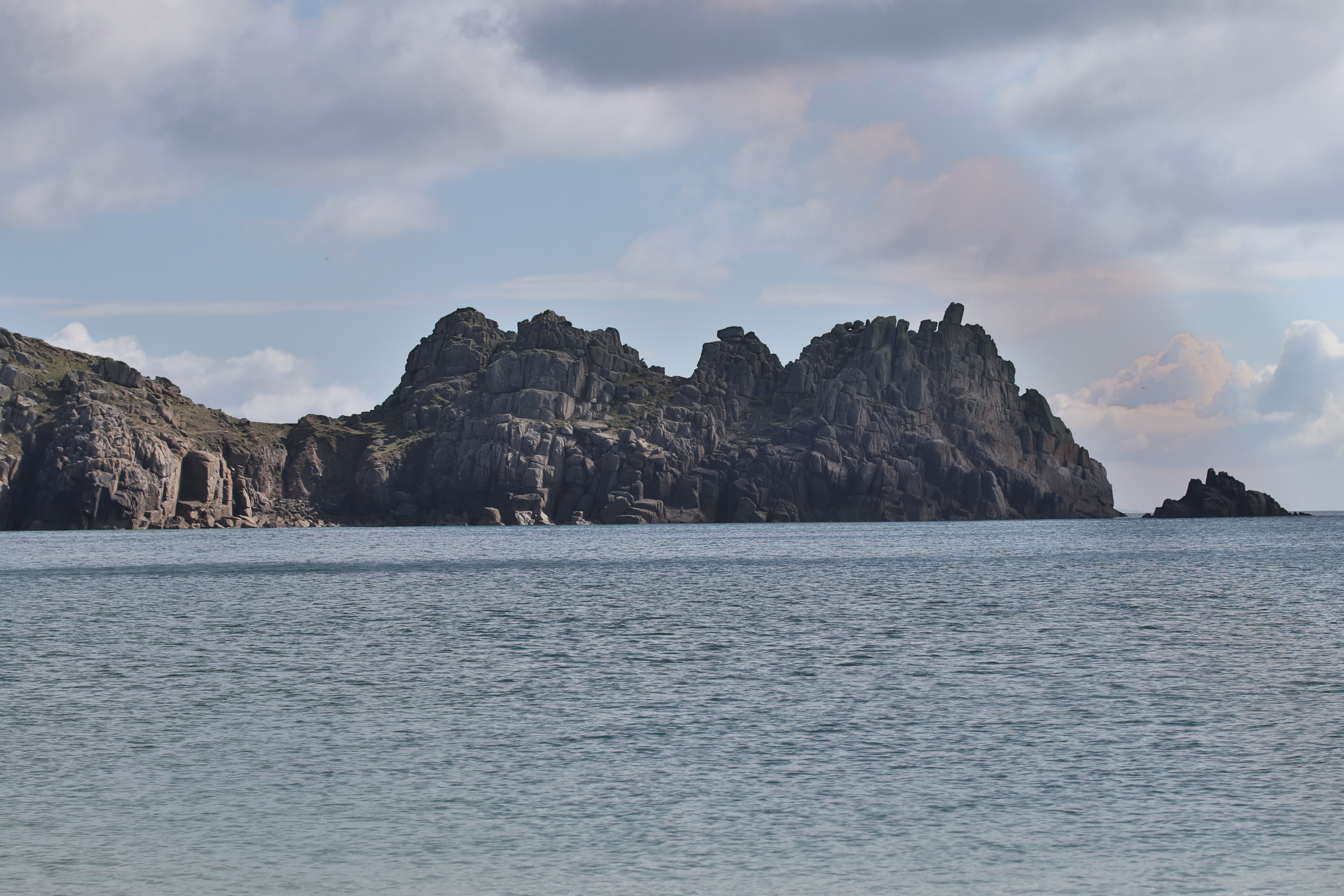
Logan Rock Treen Cornwall

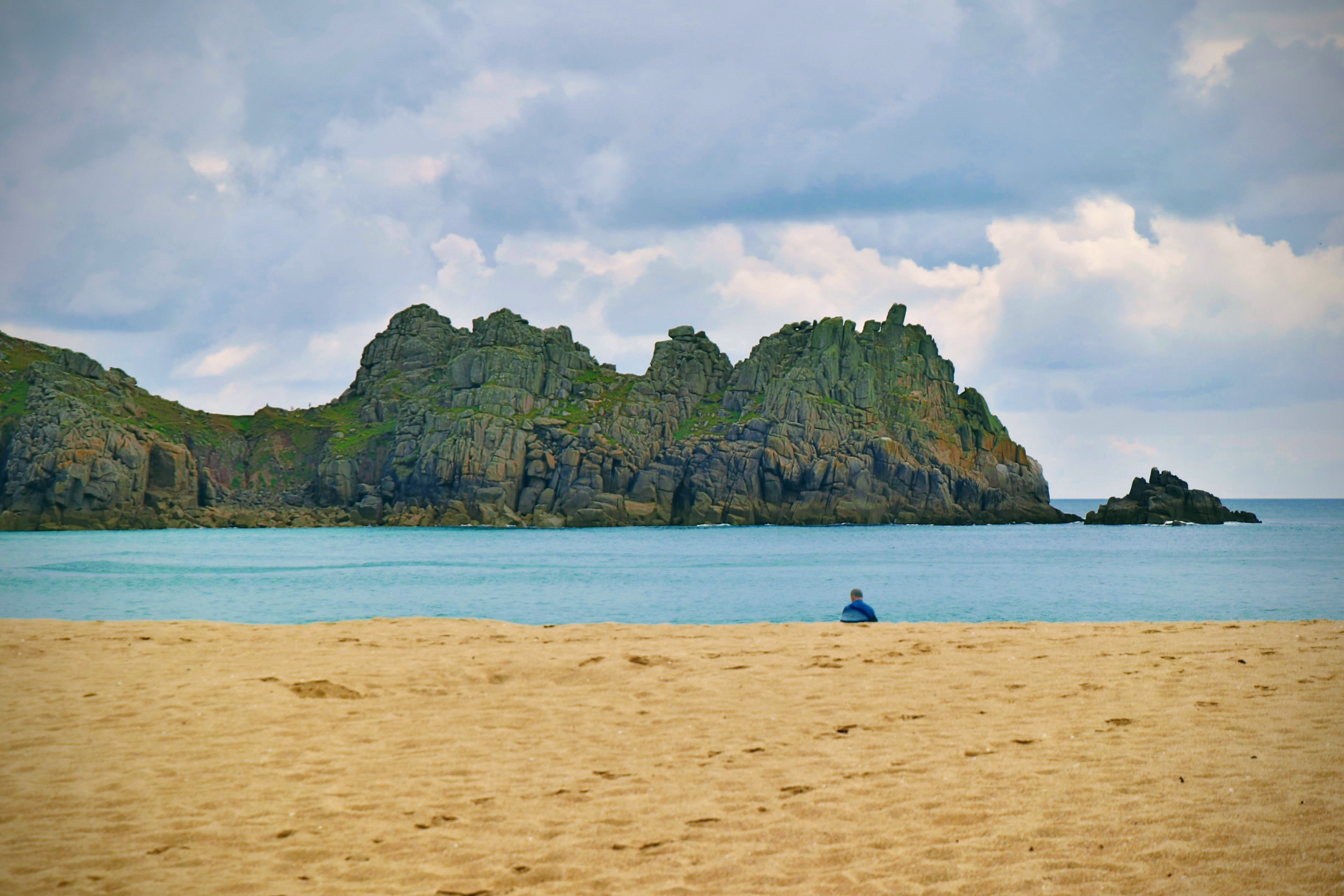
Beach view of Logan Rock Treen Cornwall
