= PK Porthcurno =

Museum in Cornwall, England

Coordinates: 50.043°N 5.654°W

- PK Porthcurno: Museum of Global Communications
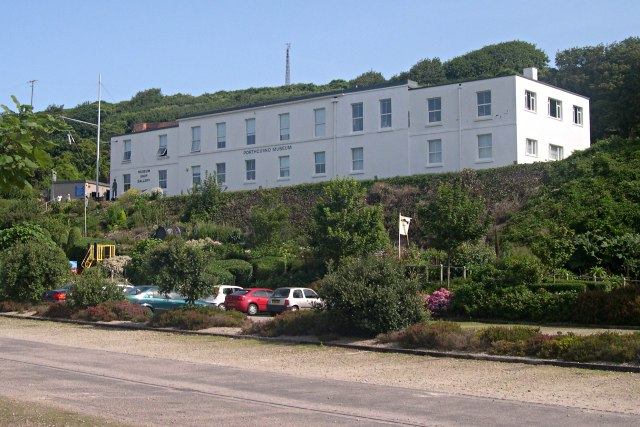
- The museum building in front of the tunnels

- Location in Cornwall
- Established: May 1998
- Location: Porthcurno, Cornwall, United Kingdom
- Type: Telecommunication museum
- Founder: Former employees of Cable & Wireless plc
- Website: pkporthcurno.com

PK Porthcurno is a museum located in the small coastal village of Porthcurno Cornwall, UK. Porthcurno was the point at which many submarine telegraph cables—transatlantic and to other locations—came ashore. The first cables were direct current impulse transmitters. The first cables with transistor amplifiers were laid in the 1950s.

The museum, which opened in May 1998, is housed in the former telegraph facility.

== History ==
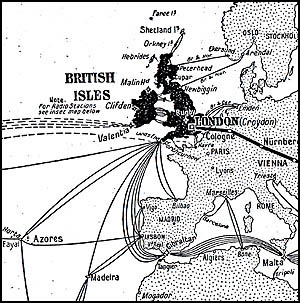
In the 19th century Porthcurno was connected to the rest of the world by submarine cables

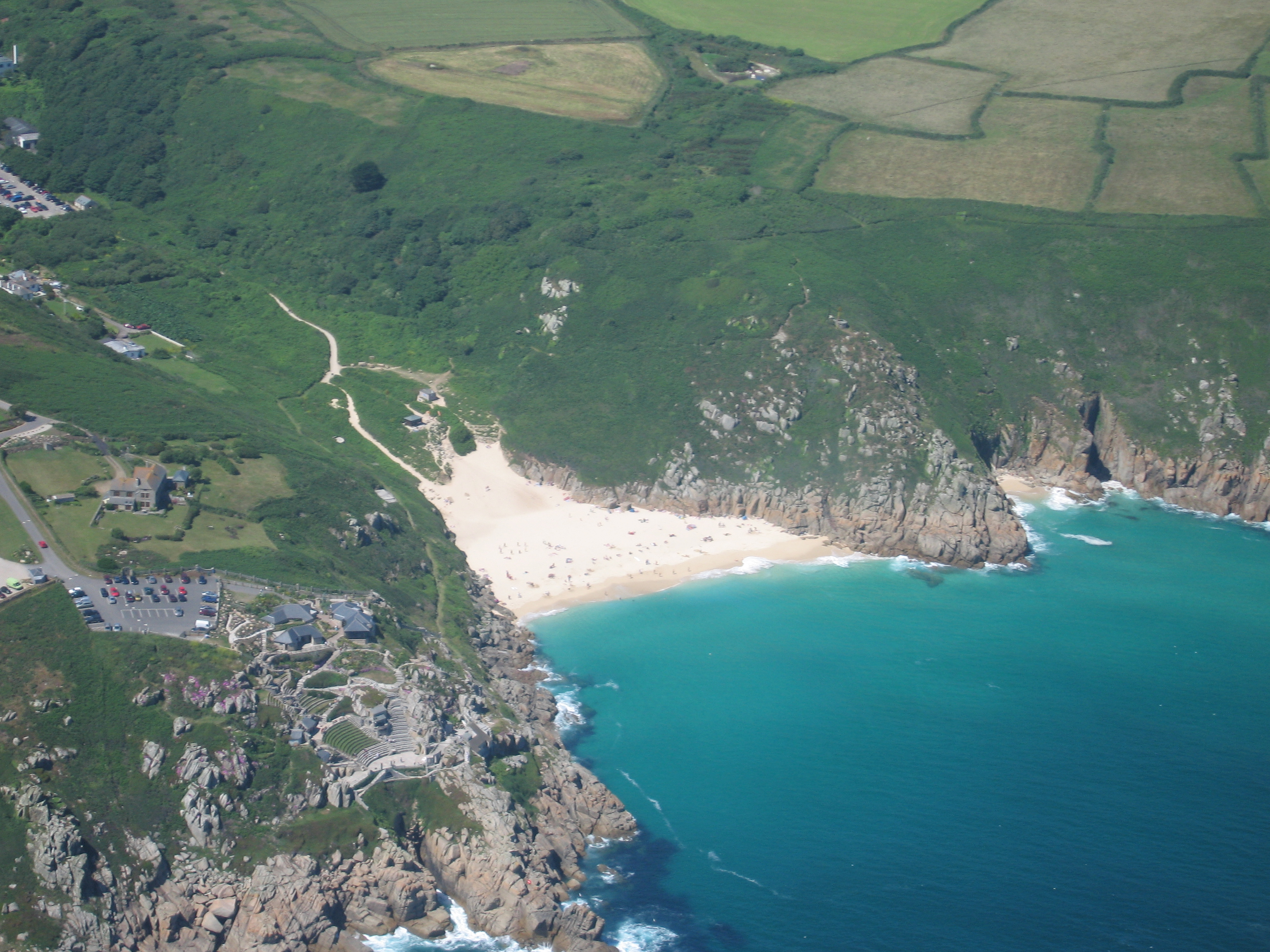
Porthcurno coast where the cables come ashore to a small building at the top of the beach

In June 1870, the Falmouth, Gibraltar & Malta Telegraph Company of John Pender (which had been established in July 1869, with capital of £660,000 (in 1870s money)) landed the final section of the first Great Britain-India submarine cable in Porthcurno. The cable section between Carcavelos and Porthcurno was laid by the Hibernia, with the shore-end being laid by the Anchor Line ship Investigator. On 23 June, the first message was sent from Bombay to Pender's house on Arlington Street, London, where he was holding a party attended by the Prince of Wales, the future Edward VII. It was received using the siphon recorder of Sir William Thomson. Next day, the line opened to public traffic.

What became the world's largest submarine telegraph station was founded at Porthcurno, initially with a staff of 16 young men. Often in early days, these young men were badly behaved and ill-disciplined.

Further cables to Newfoundland, France, Spain, and Gibraltar were landed at Porthcurno, which became the gateway to the Empire.

At the outbreak of World War II, the existing surface installations were thought to be far too vulnerable to attack, and in 1941, miners were employed to cut tunnels into the solid granite of the valley's hillside to house the telegraphy equipment. Porthcurno telegraphy facility closed in 1970, 100 years after it first began its operations.

Modern cables are usually fibre optic and are much lighter in construction, international information is now made available of the locations of submarine cables.

== Museum development ==
The museum was started by former employees of Cable and Wireless based at the company's Holborn headquarters in London. It is now located in the previously excavated tunnels near Porthcurno beach, Cornwall. The layout of the museum display was carried out after receiving a grant from the Heritage Lottery Fund. The museum has displays showing the history of submarine cable-laying ships and telegraphy, and a variety of samples of undersea telegraph cable designs used throughout its long history. The museum has a varied collection of still-working equipment designed for telegraphy. It remained a training college for the communications industry until 1993. An Exeter University project known as "Connecting Cornwall" was funded to promote a new exhibition; "The Nerve Centre of Empire". This was opened in the summer of 2010 by the Princess Royal. The exhibition was developed as an educational experience for children and young people, employing original design from local artist, Hennie Haworth. There are now around 16 people working at the museum, welcoming visitors from around the world and managing with a constant flow of research enquiries from academics, family historians, local historians and the media. The most recent chapter in the museum's development involves the sensitive re-development of the Grade II listed buildings to accommodate greater exhibitions space, and improved visitor facilities including a cafe and greater accessibility. The project, 'Developing for the Future', has been supported by Heritage Lottery Fund, the Arts Council England, Coastal Communities Fund, SubOptic, the Charles Hayward Foundation,. Department for Culture, Media and Sport/Wolfson Museums and Galleries Improvement Fund, ShareGift, the Edith Murphy Foundation, the Garfield Weston Foundation, The Headley Trust, Cornwall Council and the Trusthouse Charitable Foundation. Further funding was provided by the Clore Duffield Foundation for the development of a new, flexible educational centre; the Clore Learning Space. As a result of this extensive capital project, the museum closed to the public in September 2013 and reopened in summer 2014. In 2020, it was rebranded as PK Porthcurno: Museum of Global Communications.

In March 2022, the museum was the subject of an episode of BBC Radio 4's series The Museums That Make Us, presented by Neil MacGregor.

== Collection ==
The museum's collection has designated status. It consists of a large photographic collection and the archives of Cable & Wireless plc, as well as models of cable ships, paintings, company staff magazines, cable samples (including the first transatlantic telephone cable TAT-1), and a range of telegraphic equipment.

== Museum staff and volunteers ==
The museum has around 16 professional staff, mostly full-time, and a large volunteer community. Many of the museum's technical volunteers trained or taught at the Porthcurno technical training college at some point in its history, prior to its eventual closure in 1993.

== Awards ==
The museum has won a number of awards since opening. These include:

- Cultural Enterprises Awards 2020: Green Award
- Cornwall Tourism Awards 2018/19: Gold – Small Attraction of the Year
- South West England Tourism Excellence Awards 2018–2019: Highly Commended – Small Attraction of the Year
- Holyer an Gof Awards 2017: Winner in the Booklets Class, Changing Places: Porthcurno and the roots of modern communication, by Steve Bladon, Rosalyn Goulding and others
- South West England Awards 2014–2015: Silver – Small Visitor Attraction of the Year
- South West Tourism Excellence Awards 2012/13: Bronze – Small Visitor Attraction of the Year
- Cornwall Tourism Awards 2012: Gold – Small Visitor Attraction of the Year

== Gallery ==
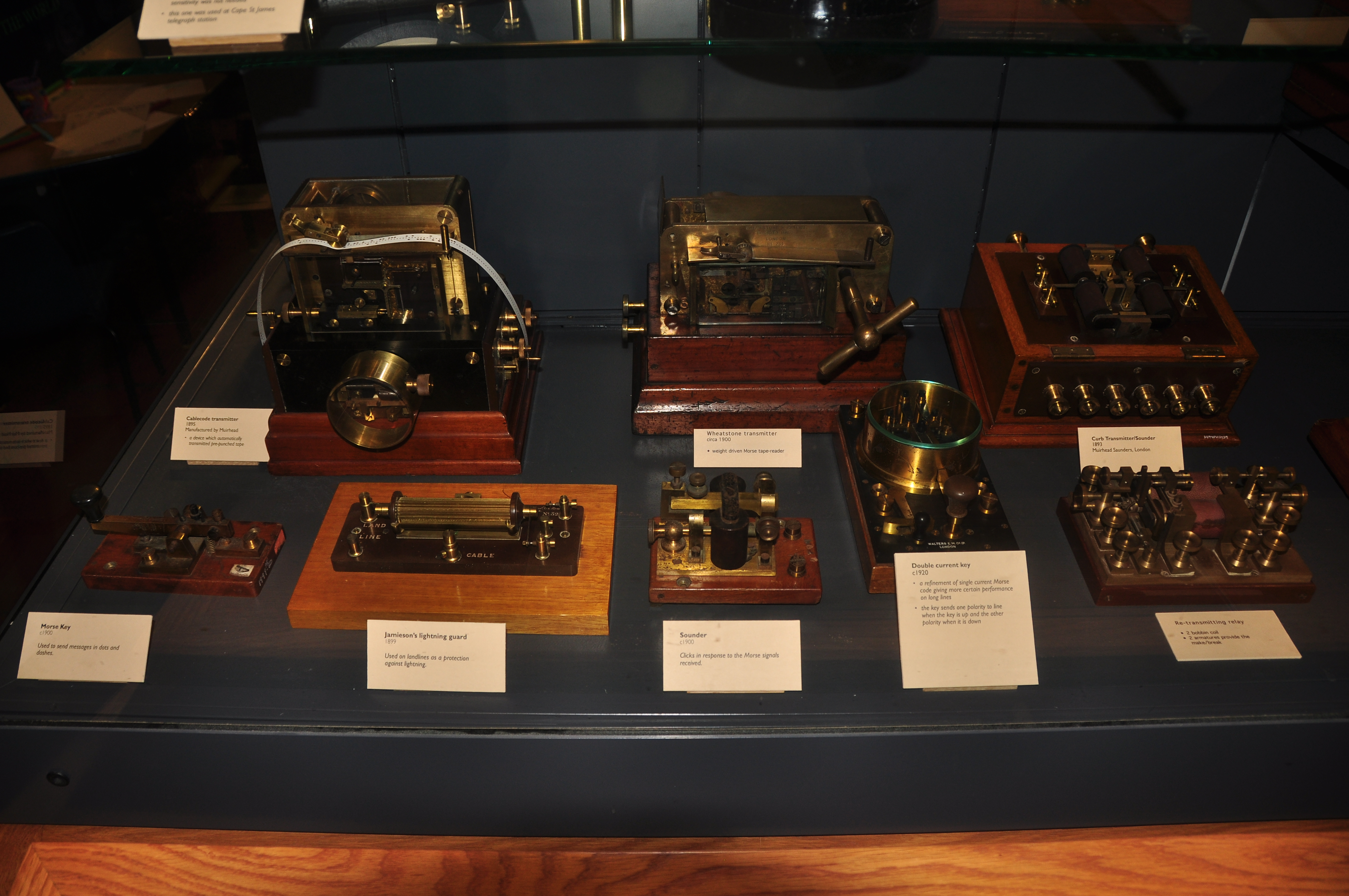
A display case in the museum

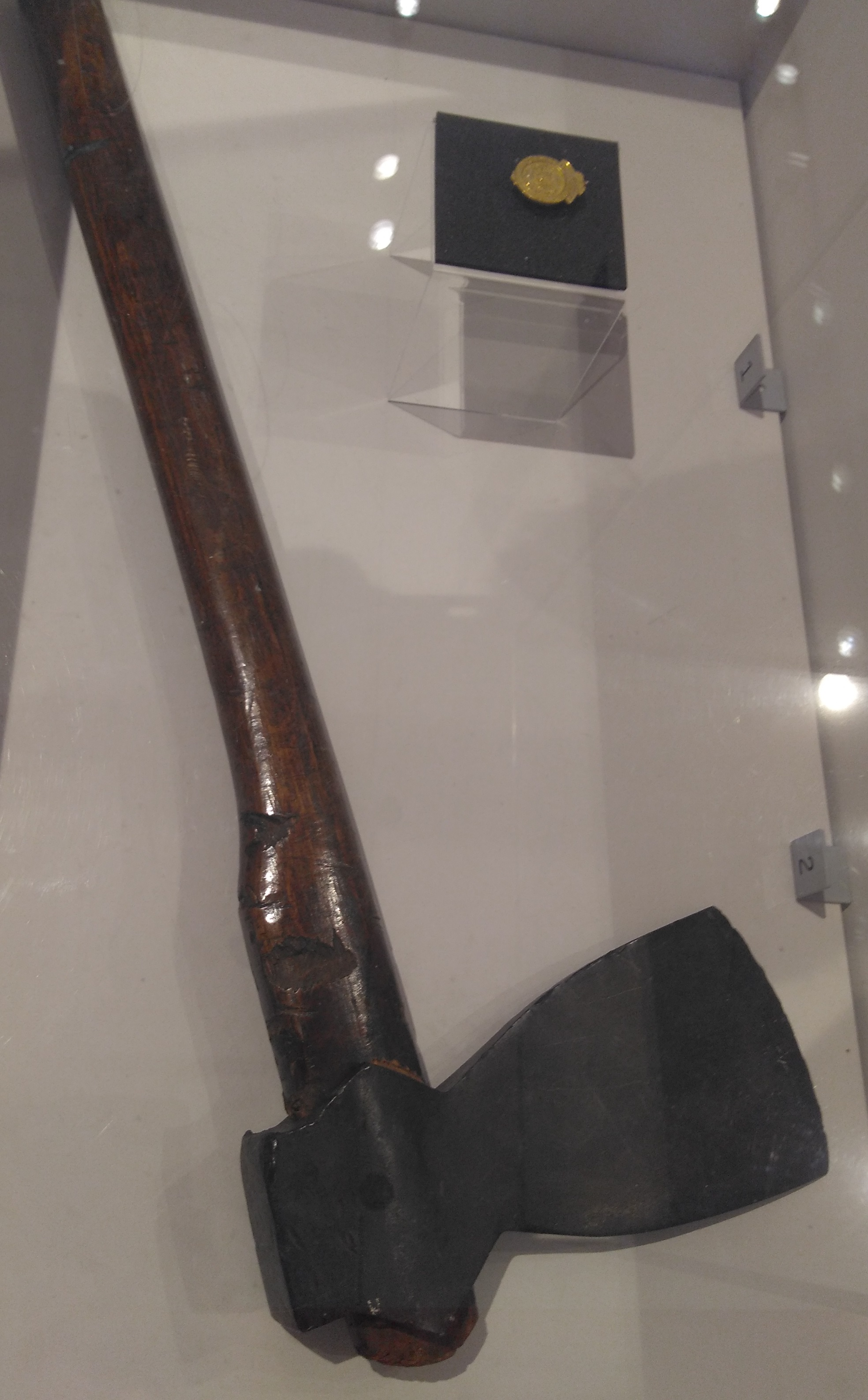
Axe used by SMS Emden landing party to cut submarine telegraph cables on Direction Island, Cocos Islands, in 1914. Displayed at Porthcurno Telegraph Museum.

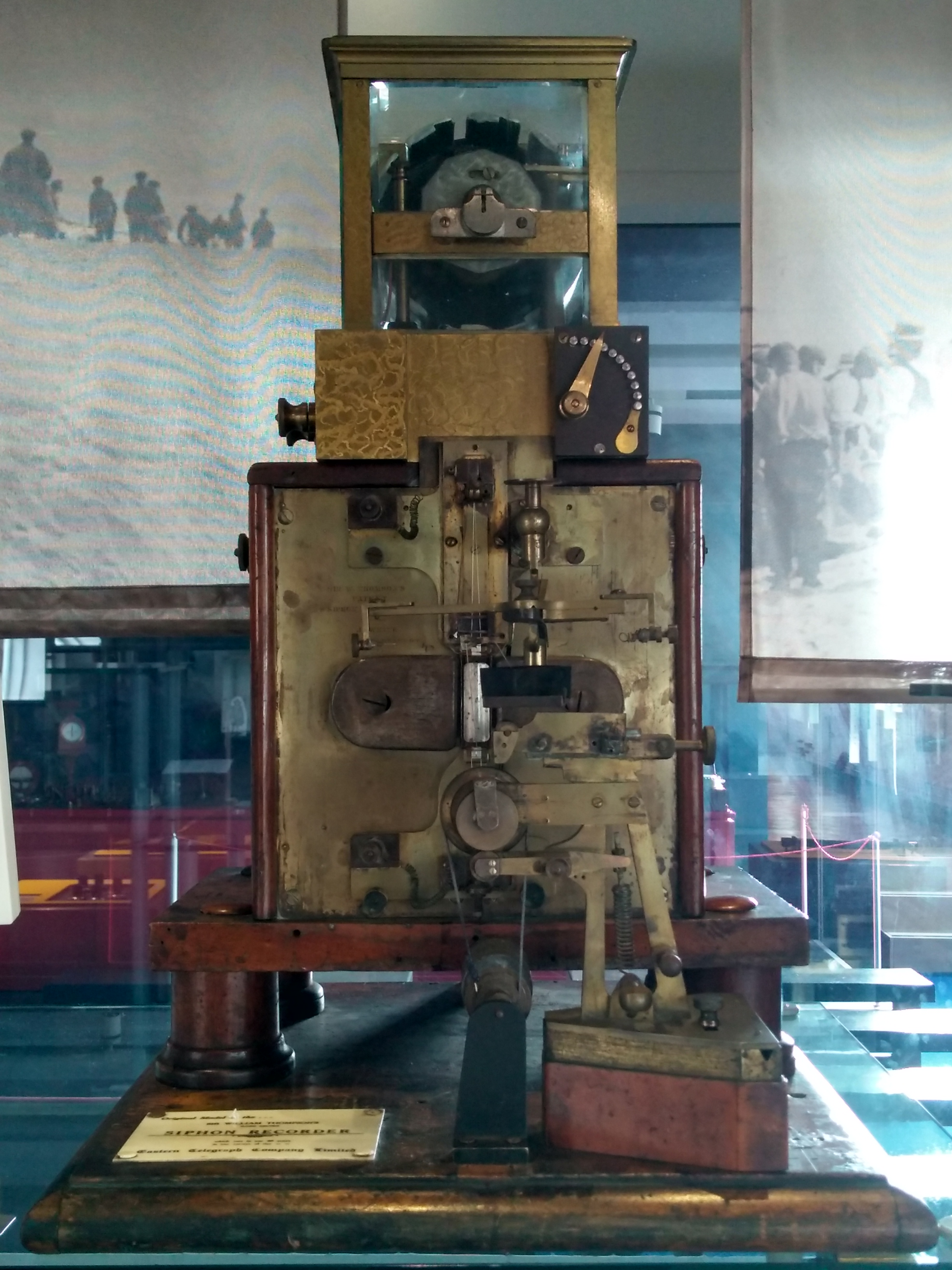
Sir William Thomson's telegraphic syphon recorder, on display at Porthcurno Telegraph Museum, in January 2019.

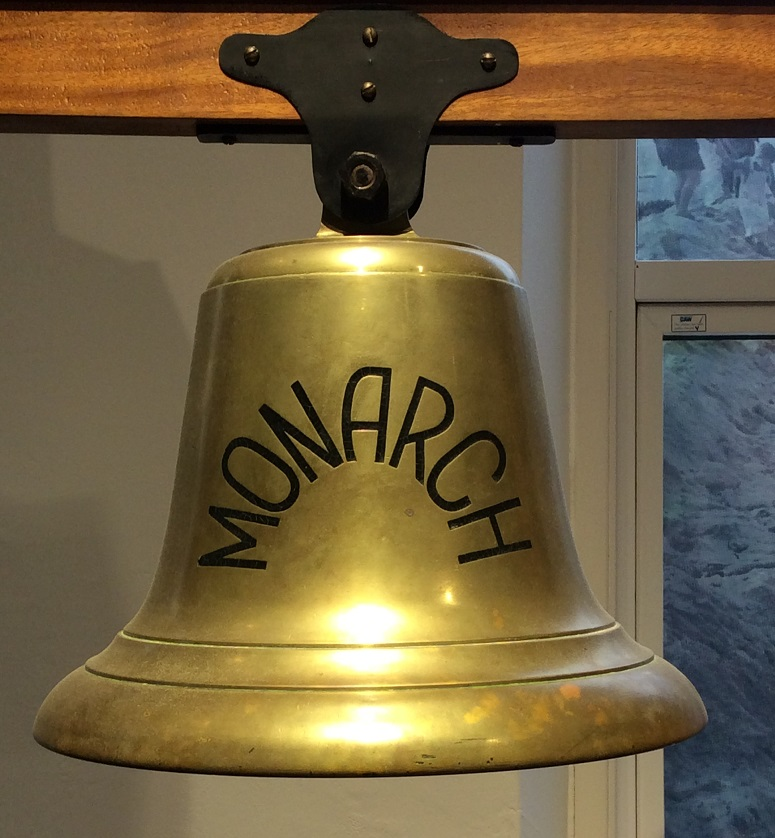
Bell from cable ship HMTS Monarch, on display at Porthcurno Telegraph Museum, January 2019.

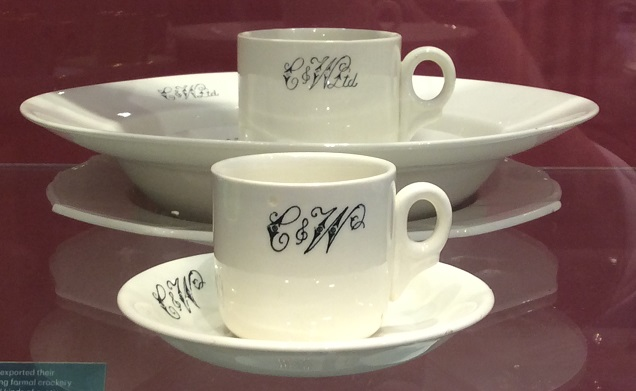
Cable & Wireless company crockery.
