= Porthcurno =

Village in Cornwall, England

Coordinates: 50.043°N 5.654°W

Porthcurno: Cornish: Porthkornow
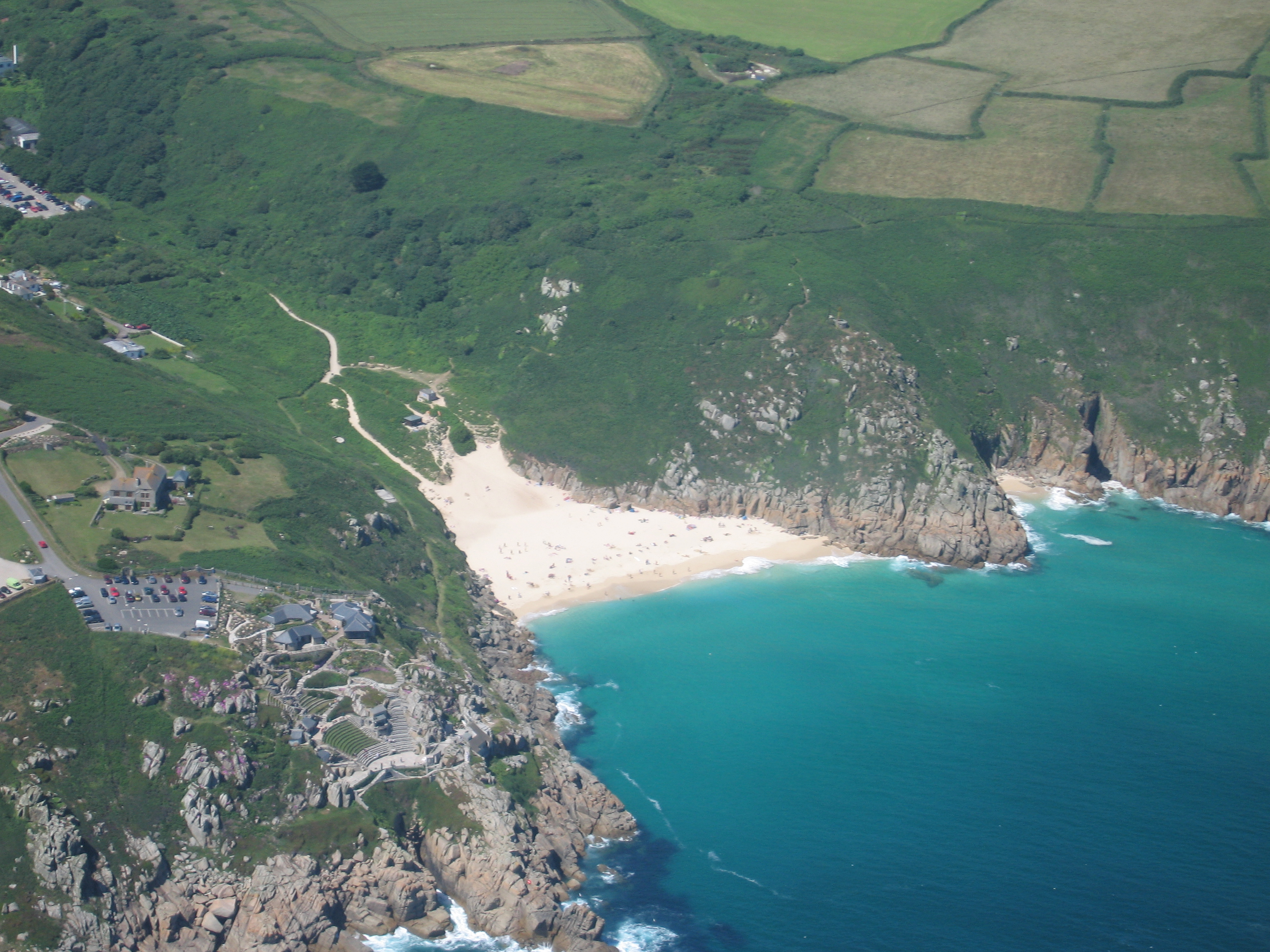
- Aerial view of Porthcurno Beach showing the Minack Theatre in the cliff face, Green Bay and the generally faint cliff-top course of the South West Coast Path.

- Location within Cornwall
- OS grid reference: SW384223
- Unitary authority: Cornwall
- Ceremonial county: Cornwall
- Region: South West
- Country: England
- Sovereign state: United Kingdom
- Post town: PENZANCE
- Postcode district: TR19
- Dialling code: 01736
- Police: Devon and Cornwall
- Fire: Cornwall
- Ambulance: South Western

Porthcurno (Cornish: Porthkornow, meaning "pinnacle cove", see below) is a small village covering a small valley and beach on the south coast of Cornwall, England in the United Kingdom. It is the main settlement in a civil and an ecclesiastical parish, both named St Levan, which comprise Porthcurno, diminutive St Levan itself, Trethewey and Treen.

It is centred 6.6 miles (10.6 km) west of the railway, market, and resort town of Penzance and 2.5 miles (4.0 km) from Land's End, the most westerly point of the English mainland. Road access is via the north end of the valley along a long cul-de-sac with short branches off the B3283 and land traditionally associated with the village, including its beach, is on the South West Coast Path.

== Amenities and homes ==
The village comprises houses and apartment blocks together with a few commercial premises along the access road known as "The Valley". The road curves inland past Minack Point to St. Levan's Church about 0.5 miles (0.80 km) from the village. At the southern end are:

- Large public car park
- A small seasonal café
- A public house.
- The South West Coast Path

The route is marked as two hours from Land's End or about four hours walk from Penzance for the most agile cliff-side path walkers.

A low-frequency bus service links Penzance, Lands End and nearby villages and hamlets including Newlyn, Paul, Sheffield, Lamorna, St Buryan, Treen, Trethewey, Polgigga and Sennen.

Porthcurno is largely not farms or fisherman's cottages today, having its linear centre inland, centred 6.6 miles (10.6 km) west of the railway, market, and resort town of Penzance and 2.5 miles (4.0 km) from Land's End, the most westerly point of the English mainland. In most local-level organisational and community bodies, it is in civil and ecclesiastical parishes named Saint Levan and usually spelled as St Leven since the 18th century.

== The Cable Station and Engineering College ==
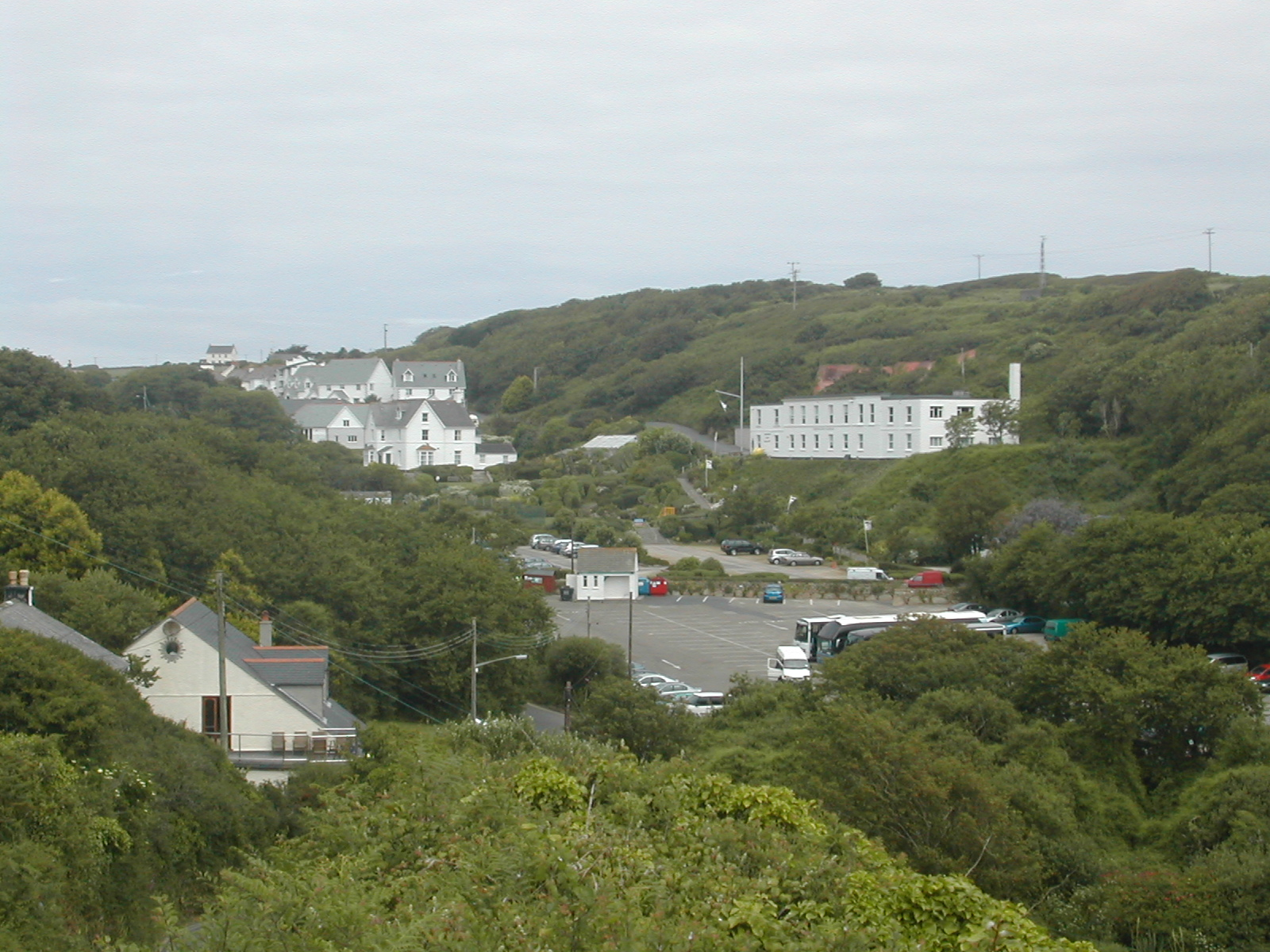
Porthcurno Valley looking north showing the car park and a few of the former Engineering College buildings.

Porthcurno is unusually well known for its size because of its history as a major international submarine communications cable station. In the late nineteenth century, the remote beach at Porthcurno became internationally famous as the British termination of early submarine telegraph cables, the first of which was landed in 1870, part of an early international link stretching from the UK to India, which was then a British colony. Porthcurno was chosen in preference to the busy port of Falmouth because of the reduced risk of damage to the cables caused by ships' anchors. In 1872, the Eastern Telegraph Company (ETC) Limited was formed which took over the operation of the cables and built a cable office in Porthcurno valley. The concrete cable hut, where the cable shore ends were connected to their respective landlines, is a listed building and still stands at the top of the beach. ETC and its cable operations expanded through the late nineteenth and early twentieth centuries, in 1928 to merge with Marconi's Wireless Telegraph Company Limited to form Imperial and International Communications Limited which was renamed Cable and Wireless Limited in 1934. Cable and Wireless Limited was a predecessor company of Cable & Wireless Worldwide and Cable & Wireless Communications.

In the inter-war years, the Porthcurno cable office operated as many as 14 cables, for a time becoming the largest submarine cable station in the world, with the capacity to receive and transmit up to two million words a day. Porthcurno is still known colloquially by the acronym 'PK' being represented in Morse code as 'di-dah-dah-dit' followed by 'dah-di-dah', communicating with a line operator and testing connections, an acronym often sent.

Over the years, many apprentices were trained at the Porthcurno cable office in telegraphy and supporting skills, initially by ETC and then by Cable and Wireless. In 1950 the latter, nationalised, opened its Porthcurno engineering college which provided many courses in branches of telecommunications for employees, secondees and external students. The cable office closed in 1970, exactly 100 years after the first cable was landed, but the college remained open, receiving substantial investment in buildings and training equipment through the 1970s and 1980s; however, due to its isolation from towns, it closed in 1993. Some of its buildings were demolished. After the closure of the college, the award-winning Porthcurno Telegraph Museum was opened. This museum has been featured locally and nationally on educational programmes, including the BBC TV documentary series What the Victorians Did for Us and Coast. It occupies some of the former college buildings and includes many exhibits, in 'The Tunnel'.

== World War II tunnels ==
The cable office at Porthcurno was a critical communications centre and considered at serious risk of attack during the Second World War, being only about 100 miles (160 km) from the port of Brest in occupied France. To improve security, a network of two parallel tunnels, connected by two smaller cross-tunnels, was bored into the granite valley east side by local tin mining labourers, starting in June 1940, to accommodate the essential telegraph equipment. Each of the two main entrances was protected by offset double bomb-proof and gas-proof doors. To provide evacuation for staff in case the defences failed, a covert emergency escape route was provided by granite steps cut into a steeply rising fifth tunnel leading from the rear cross tunnel to a concealed exit in the fields above.

Each of the main tunnel interiors was that of a windowless open-plan office constructed as a building shell within the granite void, complete with a pitched roof to collect water seepage from the rocks, a false ceiling, plastered and decorated walls, and all the necessary services. In total about 15,000 tons of rock were removed to construct the tunnels. The construction work progressed relentlessly day and night, taking nearly a year, and the completed tunnels were opened in May 1941 by Lady Wilshaw who was the wife of Sir Edward Wilshaw, Chairman of Cable and Wireless at the time.

The concrete defences around the tunnel entrances and the nearby buildings were camouflaged with the help of a local artist: the design, when viewed from the air with some imagination, resembled a belt of trees, complete with rabbits and birds. The tunnel environment being secure, dry, and at a virtually constant temperature proved to be ideal for the sensitive telegraph equipment and it continued to house the subsequently upgraded equipment after the war until the cable office closure in 1970. It was then used for training facilities for the Engineering College until the college itself also closed in 1993. Today the tunnel houses exhibits of, and is itself an exhibit of, the Museum of Global Communications, operated by PK Porthcurno.

== Porthcurno coastal area ==
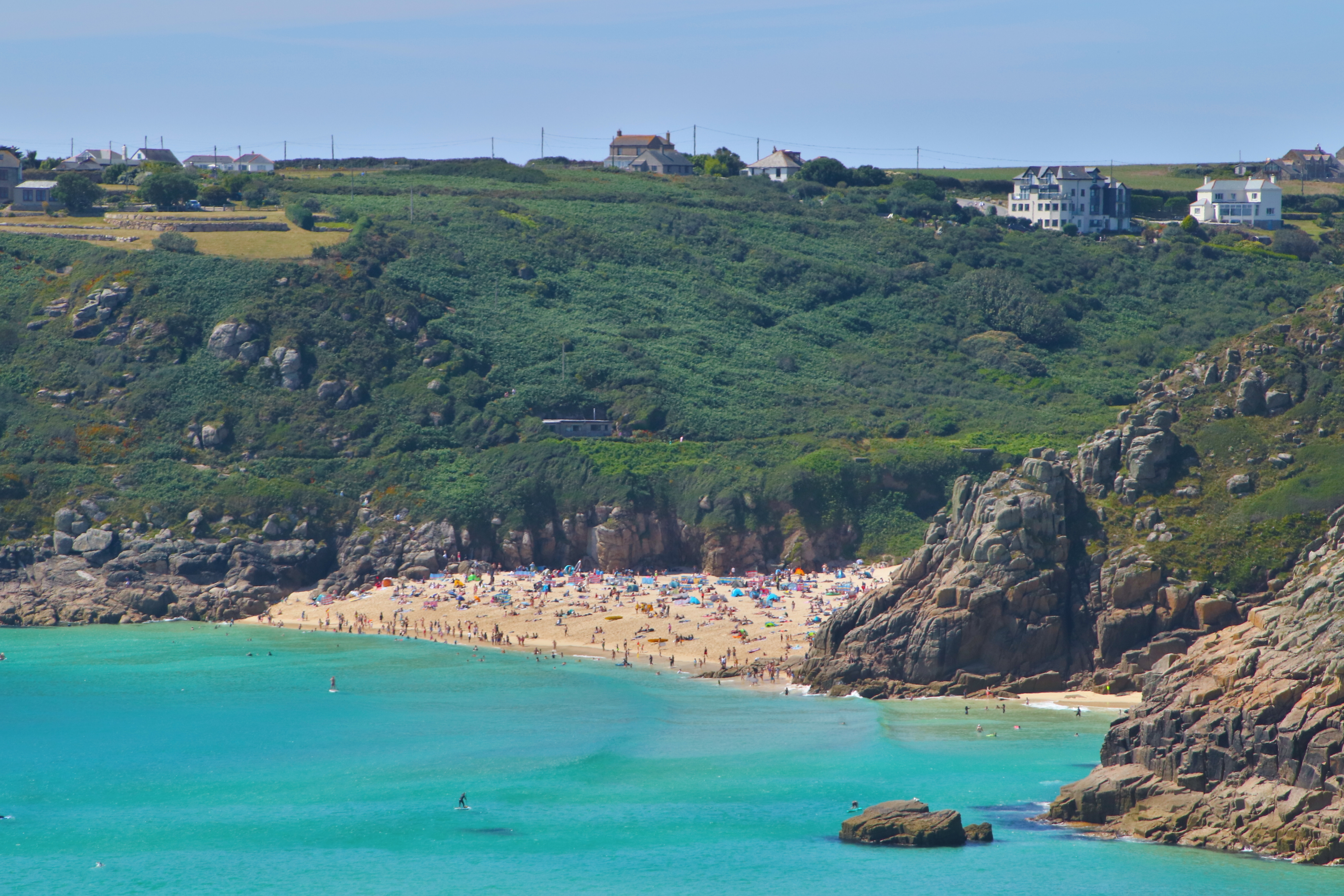
The beach can get extremely busy in the summer

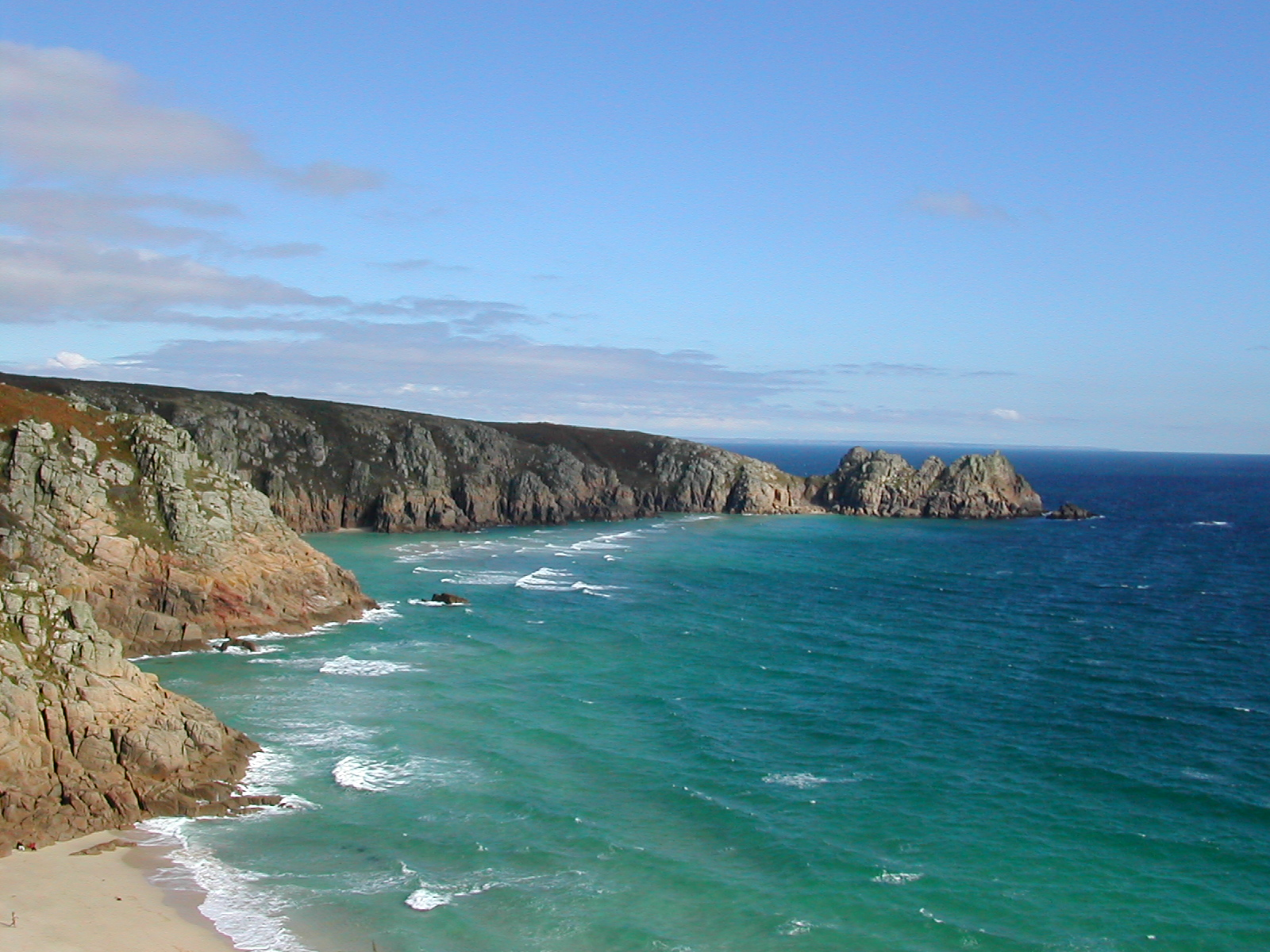
Porthcurno Bay and Logan Rock headland

The cliffs and coastline around Porthcurno are officially designated Areas of Outstanding Natural Beauty. Part of the Cornwall Area of Outstanding Natural Beauty (AONB) and widely considered as some of the most visually stunning in the United Kingdom.

Porthcurno Beach and bay enclosed by the Logan Rock headland has been listed among the ten most beautiful bays in the World. The cliffs are enjoyed by walkers using the many public footpaths in the area and the protected South West Coastal Footpath passes through the area often within just a few yards of the clifftops. Coastal areas around Porthcurno, including those formerly owned by Cable and Wireless, are now owned, preserved and maintained by the National Trust and the remainder by the local parish council on behalf of Cornwall Council. The nearby cliffs rise to 60 m to 70 m above mean sea level and are formed from a bedrock of prismatic granite; over the geological timescales having been eroded, shaped and divided vertically and horizontally sometimes almost into rounded cubic blocks.

An ancient bridleway, probably an early route to Porthcurno beach via the nearby Trendrennen Farm, about half a mile to the east of the village, has been opened by the Ramblers Association. This was probably used by horse-drawn carts to collect seaweed which was used for land fertilisation.

Porthcurno Beach and Bay, a few hundred yards south of the village is situated in the shelter of the Logan Rock headland just less than one mile (1.6 km) to the east. The beach is noted for its sand of crushed, white sea shells, privacy, and isolation rather than the movement of ships. Porthcurno Bay has been described as "floored by glorious white sand that shines through translucent water". Sometimes combinations of wind, tides and sea currents can change the 'sandscape' dramatically in a few hours, but the volume of sand is sufficient that it is unusual for the beach to be completely inundated by the sea at high tide. To the immediate east of Porthcurno beach, on the other side of Percella Point is a small tidal beach called Green Bay. Sometimes this is accessible with caution from Porthcurno Beach at low tide.

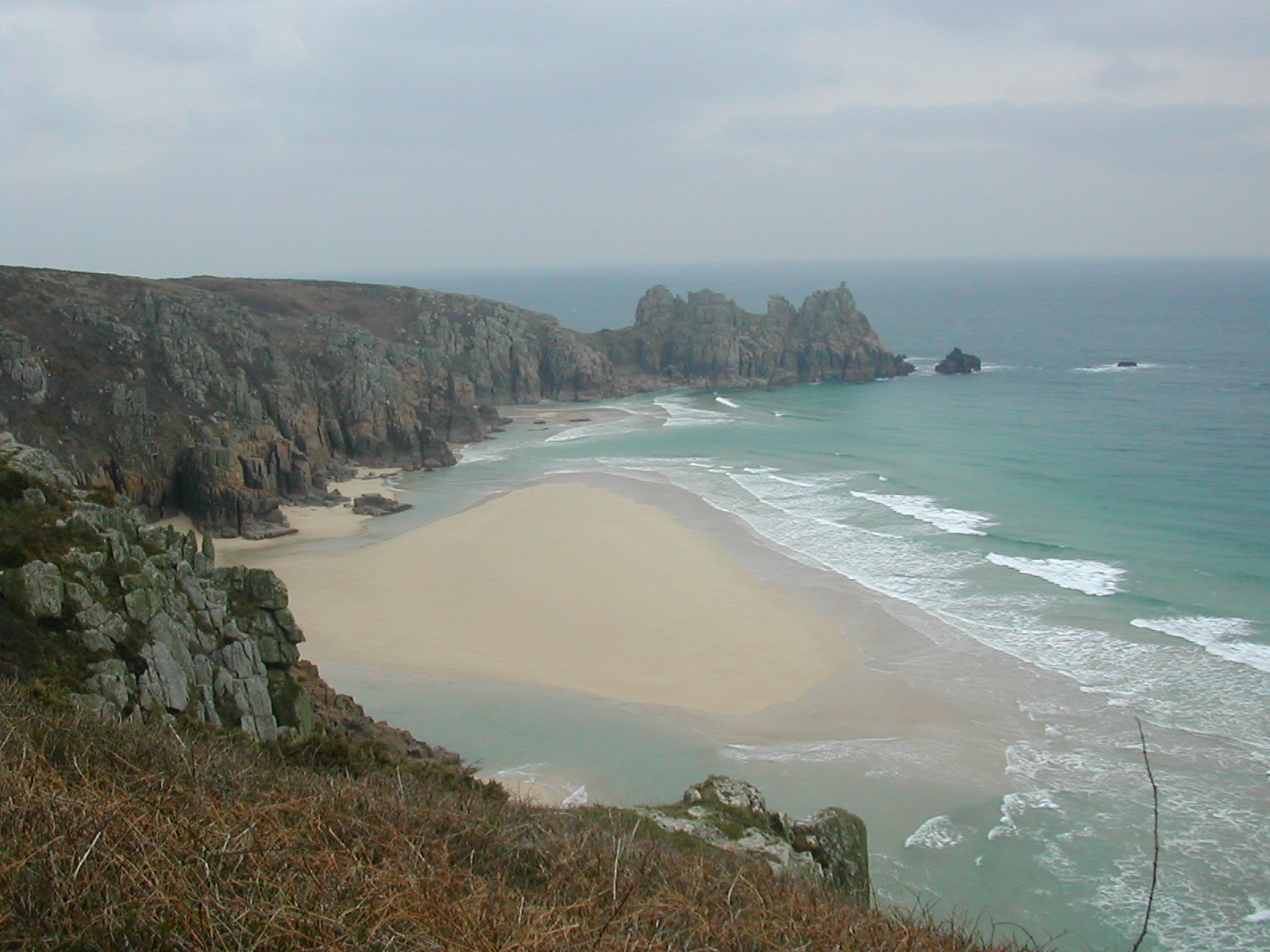
Pedn Vounder beach at low tide with the Logan Rock headland behind

Another tidal beach called Pedn Vounder lies further to the east between Porthcurno and the Logan Rock headland for which footpath access is by a steep and rugged path leading down from the cliff path. Often a sand bank forms off Pedn Vounder at low tide. Unlike the nearby fishing coves of Penberth and Porthgwarra, about one and a half miles (2.4 km) to the east and west respectively, Porthcurno has no known recent history of commercial fishing activity.

== Demography ==
2011 published statistics: population, home ownership and extracts from physical environment, surveyed in 2005
Output area	Homes owned outright	Owned with a loan	Socially rented	Privately rented	Other	km^{2} green spaces	km^{2} roads	km^{2} water	km^{2} domestic gardens	km^{2} domestic buildings	km^{2} non-domestic buildings	Usual residents	km^{2} total
St Levan (civil parish)	102	54	19	41	7	9.18	0.13	0.13	0.18	0.03	0.04	446	9.75

== White pyramid ==
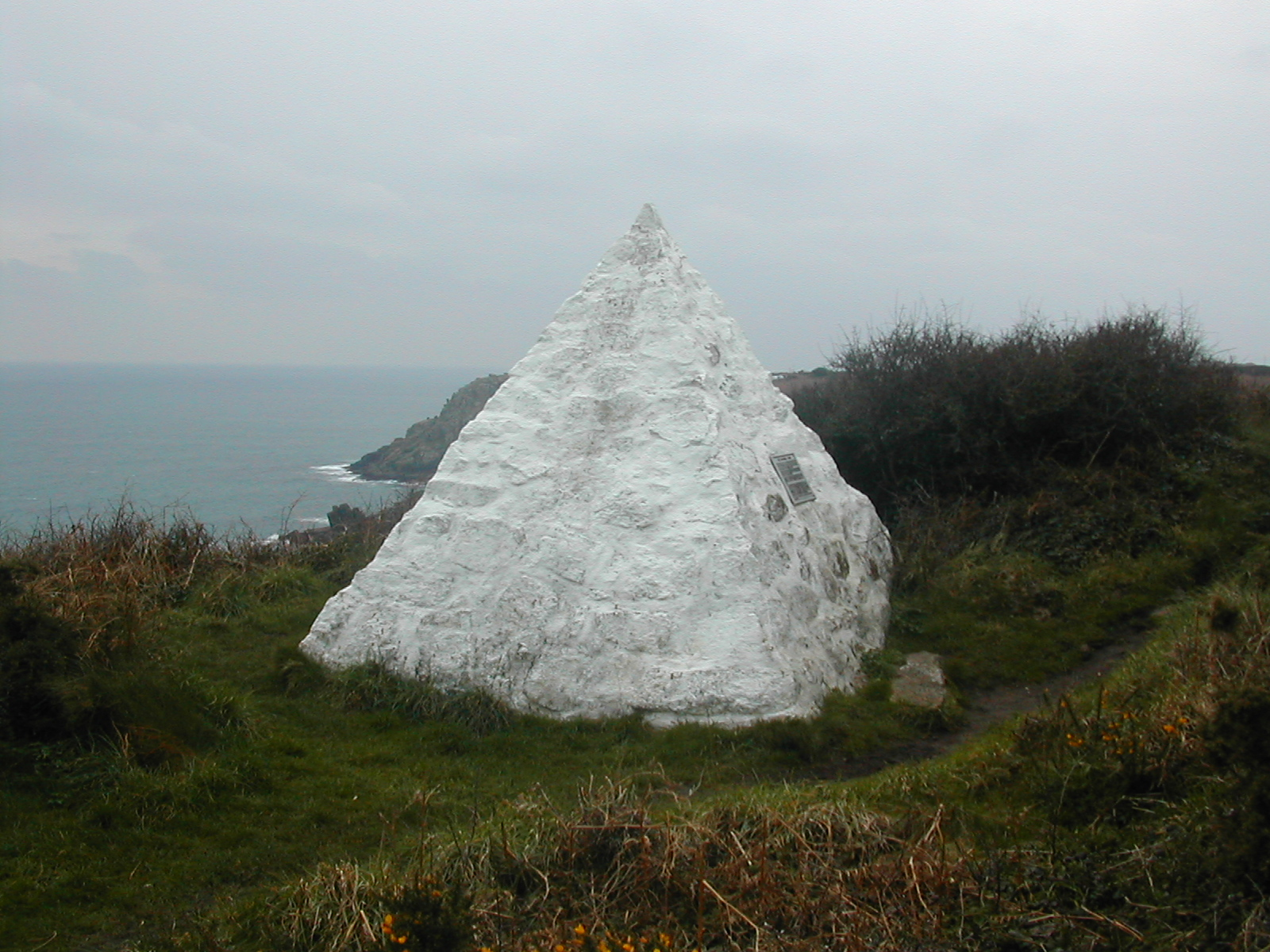
The white pyramid which replaced a clifftop hut at which the submarine telegraph cable from Brest in France was terminated

About halfway along the main coastal footpath from Porthcurno to Logan Rock another path loops off to the cliffs above Pedn Vounder beach. Beside this is a pyramid built from granite blocks and painted white, about 3 metres (9.8 feet) tall. For navigation, it replaced a brightly coloured hut which housed the termination of another submarine telegraph cable connected to the French port of Brest owned by La Compagnie Française de Telegraphe de Paris à New York, which was laid in 1880. Overhead lines carried the signals to and from Penzance which had the cable office. Some of the stone ducting which was built up on the cliffside to protect the cable is still visible from the footpath nearby. This was part of the first cable connection from the UK to the American continent passing from Porthcurno to Brest and then via the trans-Atlantic cable first to Saint-Pierre and Miquelon near the coast of Canada, and then a further 500 km (310 mi) to Cape Cod, Massachusetts. In 1919, another Compagnie Française cable was laid to Porthcurno but this was terminated in the Cable Hut at the top of the beach a few hundred yards to the west where it remained in operation until 1962.

== Logan Rock ==
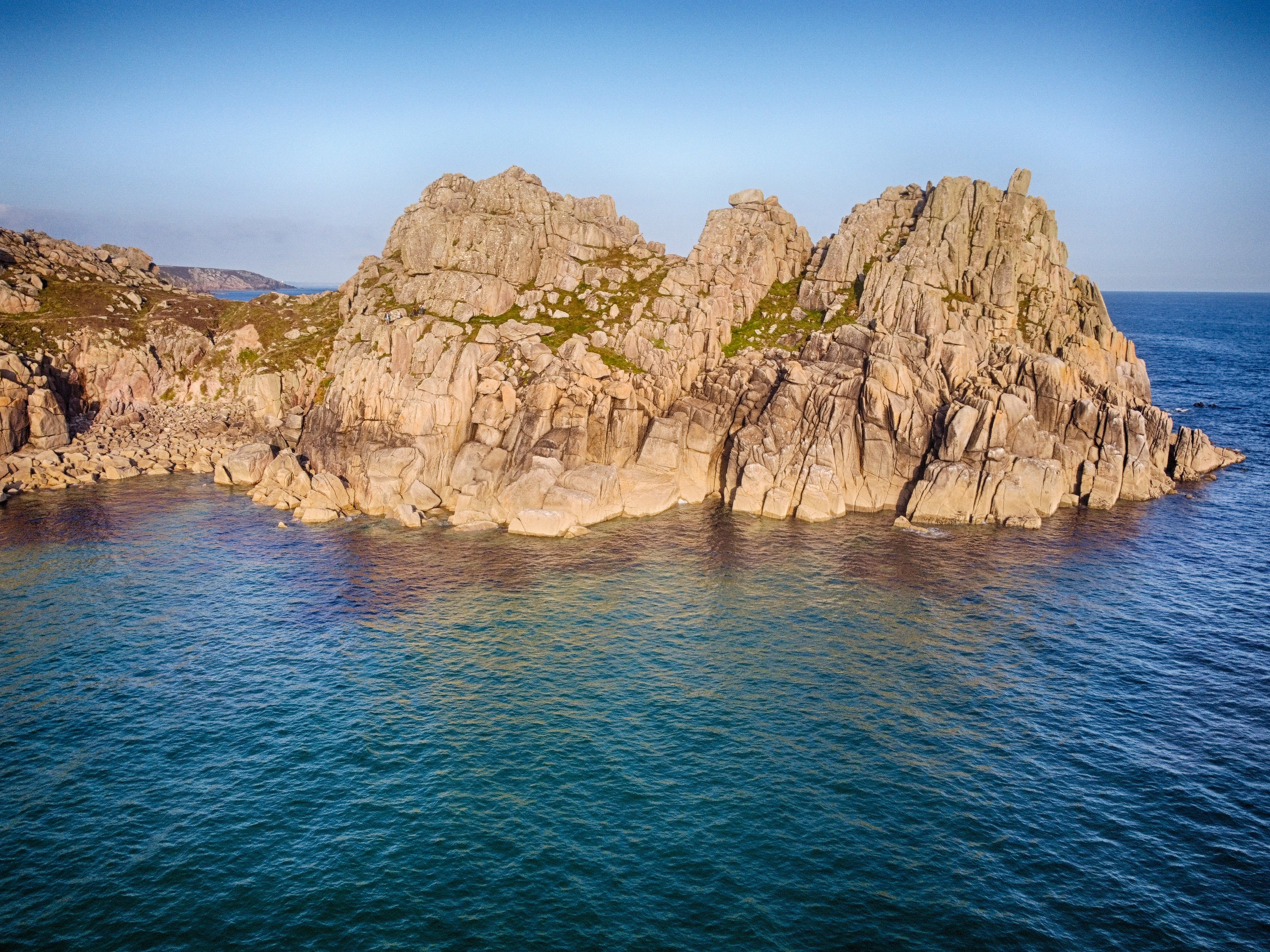
Logan Rock from the Sea

The Logan Rock headland, about 30 minutes' walk from Porthcurno to the east along the coastal footpath around Porthcurno Bay is famous for the 80 ton granite rocking stone (Logan Rock) perched at the top of the middle outcrop of rocks on the small rocky peninsula. Millennia of erosion had balanced it so finely that one person could move it easily. In 1824, a group of sailors led by Lieutenant Hugh Calville Goldsmith, nephew of the poet Oliver Goldsmith, and the worse for drink climbed up to Logan Rock armed with crowbars and dislodged it, allowing it to fall down the cliff. Such was the disgust of the local people at this blatant act of vandalism, that they complained to the Admiralty and Goldsmith was ordered to replace the rock at his own expense. It took seven months, 60 labourers and cost Goldsmith £130 8s d at 1824 prices (equivalent to £12,378 in 2025) to replace it. The original invoice for equipment and labour is now displayed on the wall of The Logan Rock public house in the nearby village of Treen.

Just to the north of the peninsula is evidence of an Iron Age cliff fort called Treryn Dinas, a scheduled monument comprising about five ramparts, ditches and some evidence of round dwelling huts. There is a small rocky island off the Logan Rock peninsula called Horrace and another smaller granite island called Great Goular which is only visible at low tide.

== Climate and tourism ==
Porthcurno beach

The prevailing wind is from the southwest and the winters are unusually mild for its latitude because of the influence of the warm Gulf Stream sea current crossing the Atlantic Ocean from warmer seas around the Gulf of Mexico. The local area has some of the highest average annual air temperatures of the United Kingdom. In common with much of the south Cornish coast, summer daily maxima rarely exceed about 25 degrees Celsius (77 °F) and below-freezing temperatures and frost are uncommon. The lower valley and beach enjoy a micro-climate being sheltered from winds in most directions. For the more exposed cliff-top areas, gale-force winds are common throughout the year which occasionally cause moderate structural damage to buildings locally.

In the summer months, Porthcurno is popular with families on holiday with young children who enjoy playing on the beach and perhaps some supervised bathing, as the beach is prone to strong rip currents. In the quieter seasons visitors tend to be local people and day-trippers from other parts of Cornwall. Many tourists come from elsewhere in the United Kingdom and abroad and may have rented self-catering or bed and breakfast accommodation nearby. The Porthcurno Telegraph Museum and the Minack Theatre, both bring visitors to the area.

== History ==
=== Porthkornow, Porthcornow ===
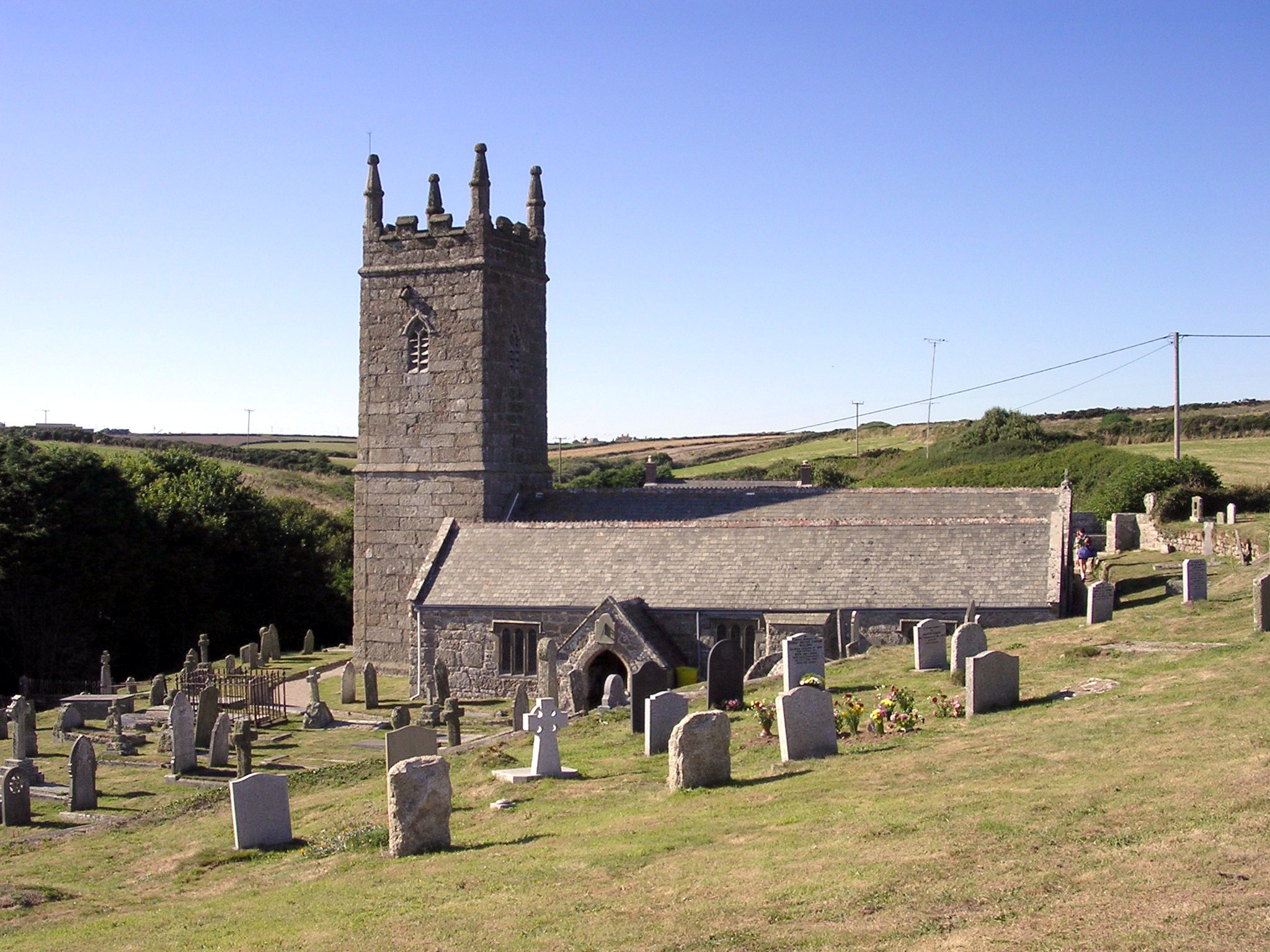
St Levan's Church, St Levan

The name Porthcurno evolved from the 16th century Cornish spelling 'Porth Cornowe'. In the Cornish language 'porth kornow / porth cornow' (Standard Written Form uses "k") meant 'cove/landing place of horns or pinnacles', a reference to the granite rock formations in the vicinity. Some evidence of early commercial port activity exists in the remains of man-made stone tracks for horse-drawn vehicles which may have provided access to the beach, visible on one of the footpaths near the south side of the car park ascending the east side of the valley.

=== Industrial and wartime developments ===
Development of the area was dominated for over one hundred years by the operations of the cable station owned by Cable and Wireless plc and its predecessor companies. Probably over 90% of the inhabitants were either employees of Cable and Wireless or were directly supported by it.

During the Second World War, Porthcurno was designated a Vulnerable Point and was heavily defended and fortified as a part of British anti-invasion preparations. At the beginning of the war a small guard of special constables was put on duty at the cable office and cable house, later superseded by a platoon of soldiers who camped on a former bowling green. Porthcurno Valley was declared a protected place and as many as 300 troops were deployed in the immediate area to guard the station. Passes were issued to residents and visitors who had business to be in the area and many mock attacks were staged. The defences included pillboxes and a petroleum warfare beach flame barrage which could be operated remotely from the tunnel. At the end of the War, although some 867 bombs fell in the (Penzance) area and 3,957 houses were damaged or destroyed, the only damage suffered by any communications equipment at Porthcurno was the destruction of an antenna when a bomb fell at Rospletha Farm, located at the top of the hill about half a mile to the west of the cable office.

=== Submarine optical fibre cables ===
Porthcurno's association with international telecommunications links continues to the present day. The first successors to submarine telegraph cables were submarine telephony cables of coaxial construction, some of which were landed at Porthcurno. In the last twenty years or so these have all been superseded by their very high-capacity modern descendants, those using fibre optic technology as the transmission medium instead of copper. These also have been landed at Porthcurno forming a significant link, part of the UK connection to the international telecommunications 'backbone' infrastructure. These form parts of international cable networks and include systems known as Trans-Atlantic Telephone Cable 12/13 (TAT-12/13), Gemini, Fibre-Optic Link Around the Globe (FLAG), and RIOJA. Each of these has thousands of times the capacity of all of their predecessors' cables put together. However, all of the successors of the telegraph cables today use Porthcurno merely as a shore landing-point for connecting to the national telecommunications network, passing directly via landlines buried under the local roads to a terminating station at Skewjack about 2 miles (3.2 km) inland from Porthcurno.

Much of the beach and surrounding shores previously owned by Cable and Wireless was donated to the National Trust in 1993.

Many of the houses built for the former Engineering College have been converted to holiday flats, making the population very seasonally dependent. Today the major industry in the area is tourism.

=== Church of St Levan ===
The 12th and 15th-century church of St Levan is between St Levan proper and Porthcurno, towards the end of the cul-de-sac main village road. It has medieval foundations and is adjoined by a graveyard which has two of the parish's six stone crosses and a small car park. It sits close to the coast path, lightly wooded slopes and adjoins pasture meadows. The largely unadulterated exterior has featured in the BBC drama Doctor Who.

== Minack Theatre ==
Narrowly out of sight of Porthcurno beach in the cliff face to the west is the Minack Theatre, a unique open-air theatre with a unique stage backdrop of Porthcurno Bay and the Logan Rock headland. It is an unusual setting for plays staged during the summer months ranging from the traditional Shakespeare to the more contemporary. The theatre is accessible on foot from the coastal footpath by a rugged path in the cliff face or more easily by road taking the steep narrow hill leaving Porthcurno to the south towards St. Levan Church and turning left at the top. It was built virtually single-handedly by the late Rowena Cade who worked there into her eighties with the support of local labourers. Today the Rowena Cade exhibition centre, coffee shop and theatre are open to visitors for most of the year except during performances.

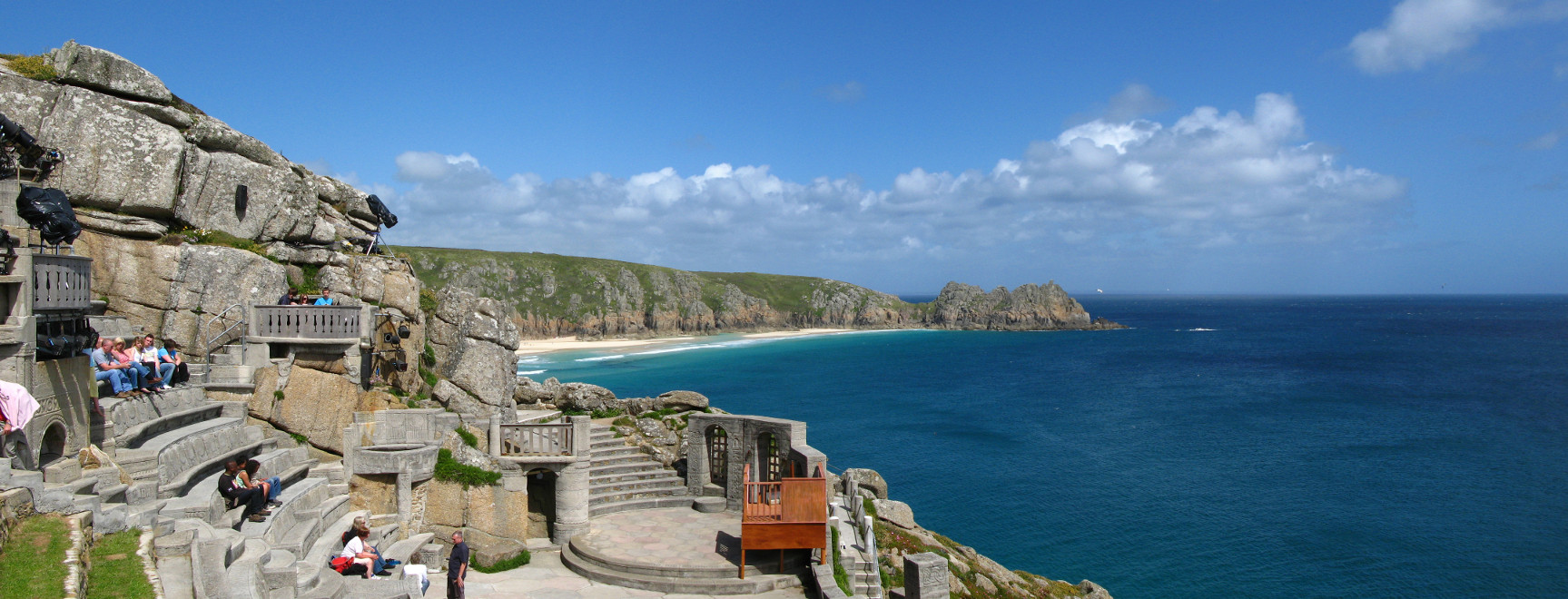
Minack Theatre and view over Porthcurno Bay.

== Wireless Point ==
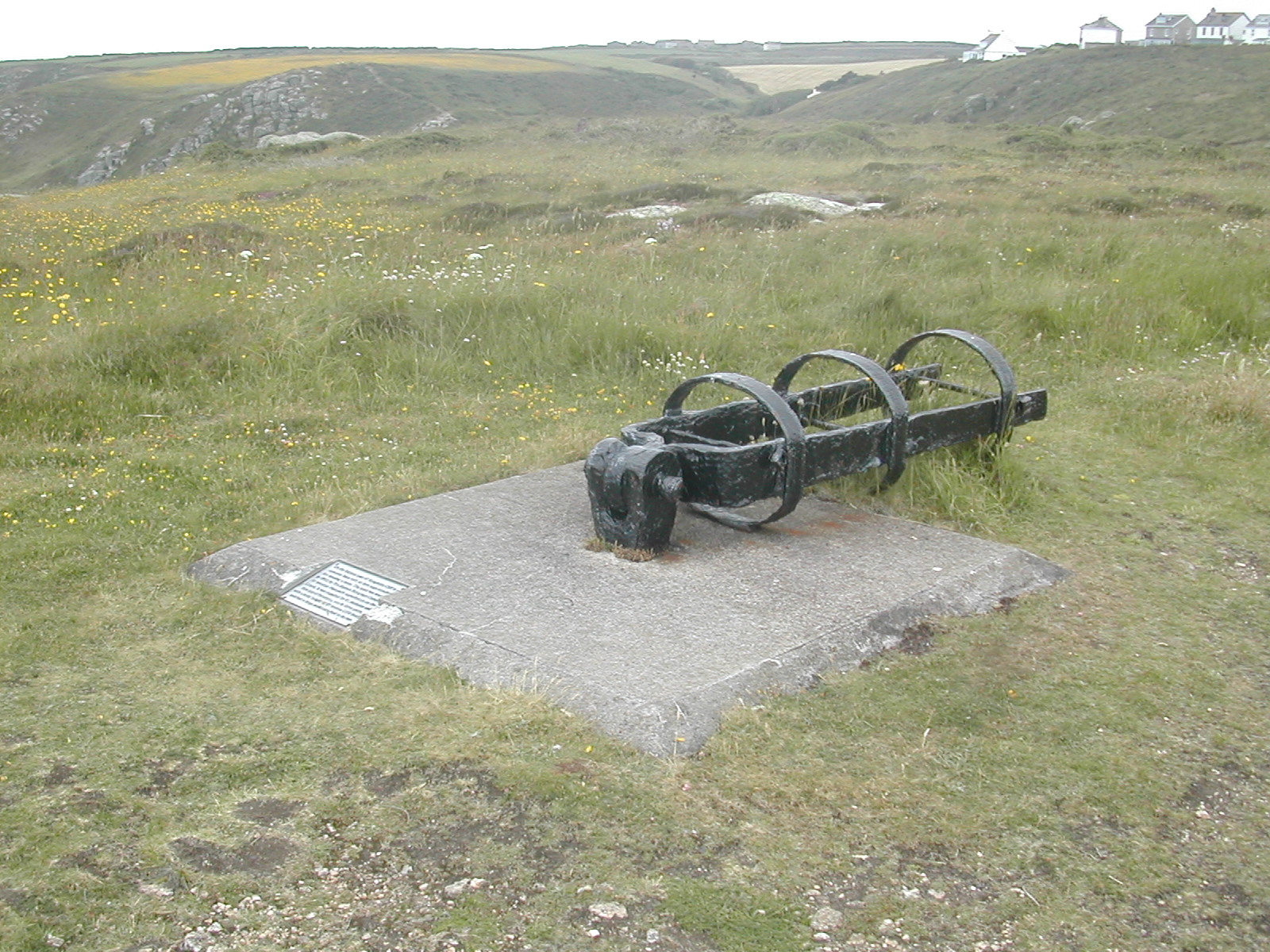
The original pivoted cage which supported a 170 feet (52 metres) mast and antenna erected by the Eastern Telegraph Company in 1902 at Pedn-men-an-Mere near Porthcurno to monitor wireless transmissions by Marconi from Poldhu, across Mount's Bay

A small headland to the west of the Minack Theatre called Pedn-men-an-Mere, which is now owned by The National Trust, (Cornish: 'rocky headland by the sea') is known locally as 'Wireless Point'. Here, exposed areas of granite bedrock and concrete plinths retain the preserved remains of the base and guy wire tether points of a wireless telegraphy antenna mast that was erected in 1902 by the Eastern Telegraph Company. It was thought that this was used to 'spy' on the early wireless transmissions by Marconi, a developer of radio, from the Poldhu cliff top about 17 miles (27 km) to the east, across Mount's Bay on the west side of the Lizard Peninsula. In those days Marconi's 'wireless telegraphy' was seen as a potential threat to the established 'cable and line telegraphy' on which the security of Porthcurno and many jobs depended. A small hut was built nearby to house the early wireless equipment and remained there for a further 21 years. The company mistakenly concluded that Marconi's efforts posed no threat to their cable business. Marconi's secretive development of the Shortwave Beam Wireless System at Poldhu would be so successful that Eastern and many other cable telegraph companies were forced into near-bankruptcy by 1928.

There is a pair of large boulders near the cliff edge of which the smaller one, weighing about 5 tons, can be rocked by the weight of one adult.

== Cornish wrestling ==
Cornish wrestling tournaments, for prizes, were held in Porthcurno in the 1800s.

== Porth Chapel beach ==
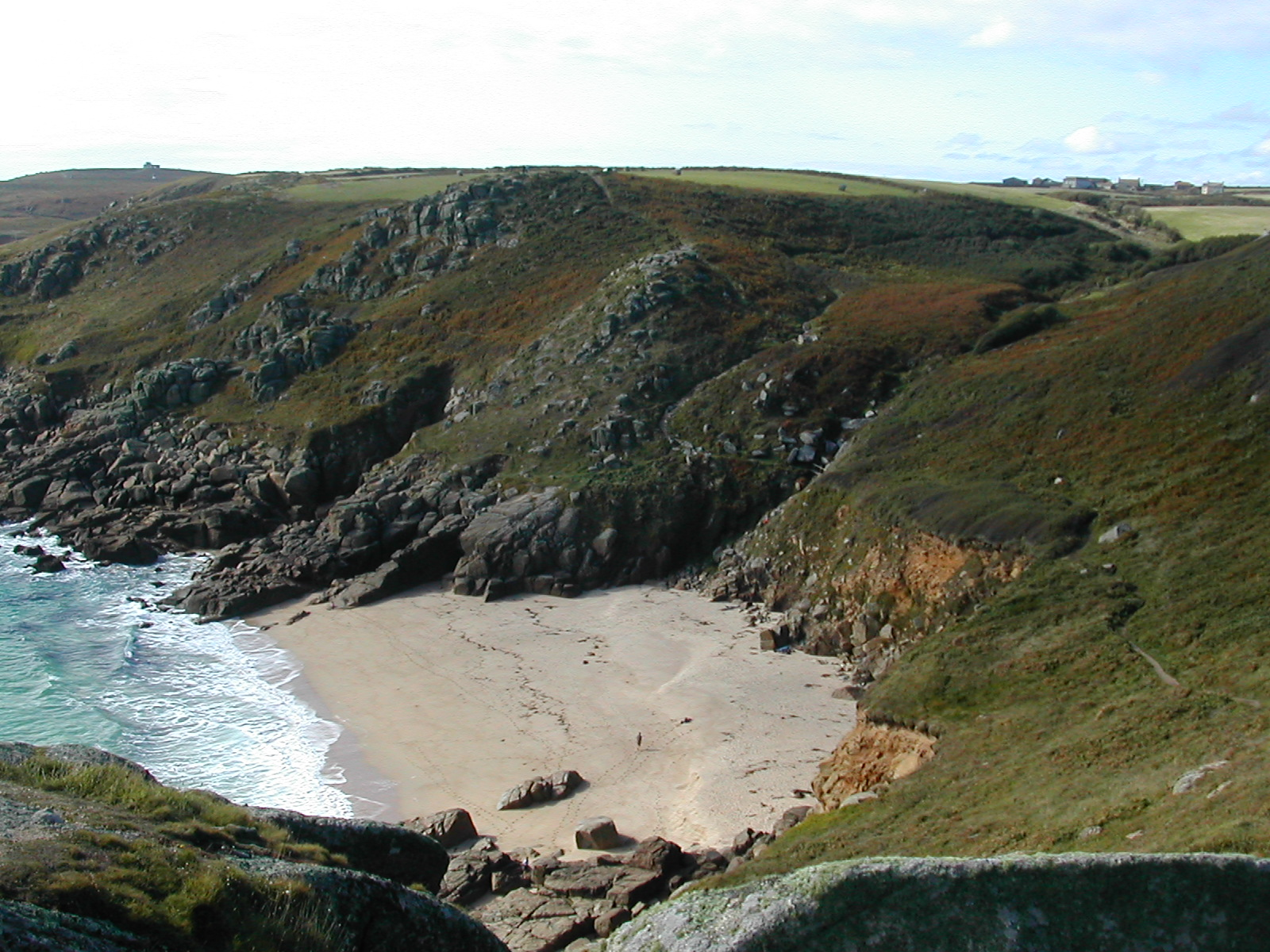
Porth Chapel Beach from Pedn-men-an-Mere

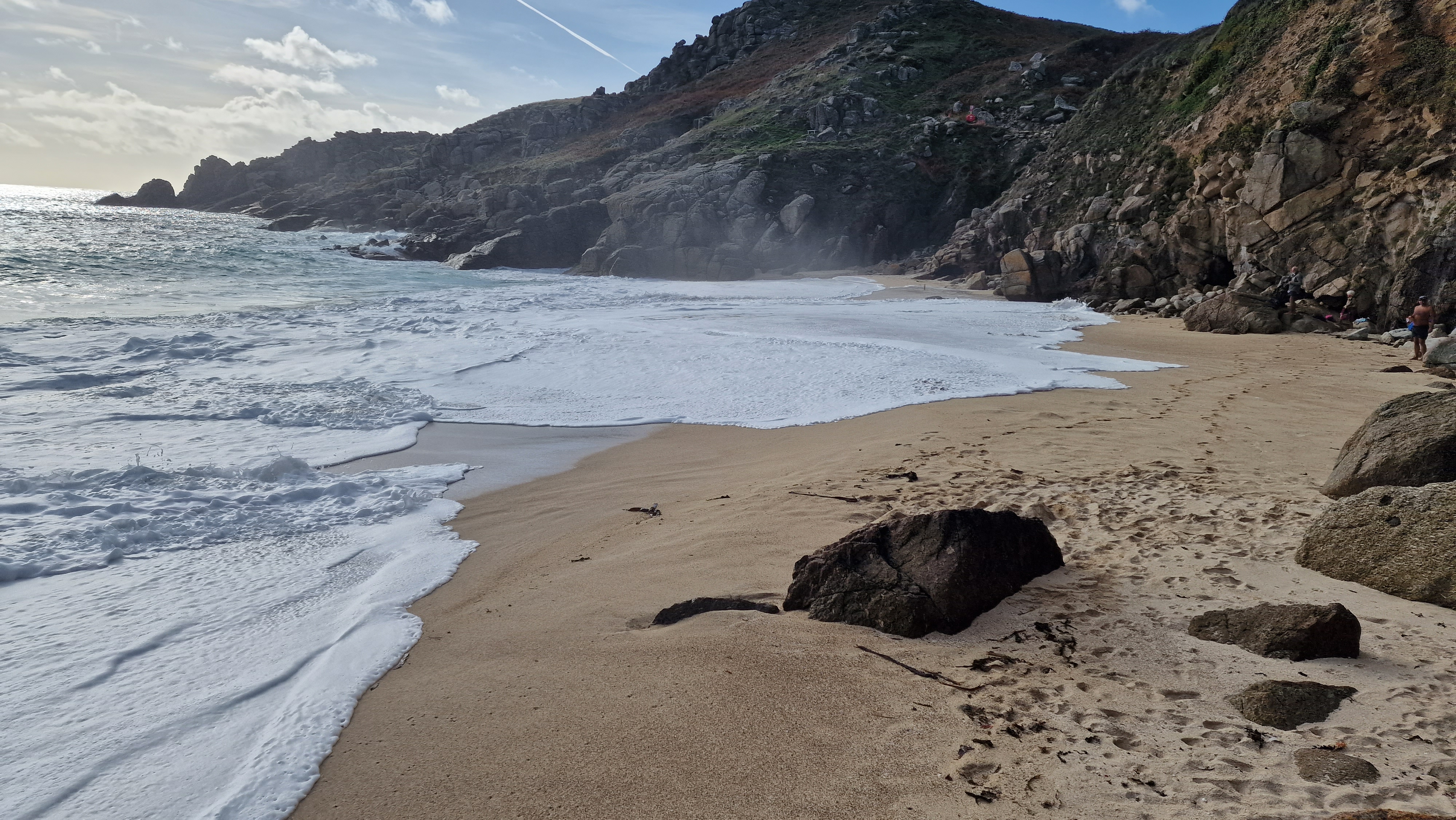
Porthchapel Beach to the West of Porthucurno

Pedn-men-an-Mere overlooks the small secluded tidal beach of Porth Chapel to the west. Porth Chapel beach is named after the remains of a Christian site and medieval chapel visible next to the footpath about 30 metres (98 ft) above the beach. There is a spring known as the St. Levan Holy Well up on the cliff which may be reached by restored medieval granite steps. The steps were covered for many years but were discovered in 1931 by the Reverend HT Valantine and Dr Vernon Favel. They were restored in 2003, part of a Cornwall County Council restoration project, and were opened by Sophie, Countess of Wessex.

== Notable residents ==
The British philosopher Bertrand Russell, his wife Dora and their children John and Kate spent the summer months from 1922 to 1927 in Porthcurno.

== See also ==
- Abermawr – the 1866 eastern terminal of the transatlantic telegraph cable
