= Lostwithiel (electoral division) =

Electoral division of Cornwall in the UK

- Electoral district
- Lostwithiel shown within Cornwall (click to zoom in)
- Country: England
- Sovereign state: United Kingdom
- UK Parliament: South East Cornwall
- Councillors: Colin Martin (Liberal Democrat)

Lostwithiel (Cornish: Lostwydhyel) is an electoral division of Cornwall in the United Kingdom and returns one member to sit on Cornwall Council. The current Councillor is Colin Martin, a Liberal Democrat.

== Extent ==
Lostwithiel covers the town of Lostwithiel, the villages of Lanlivery and Lerryn, and the hamlets of Sweetshouse, Redmoor, No Man's Land, Ponts Mill, Milltown, Downend, Bofarnel, Fairy Cross, Penpoll, St Veep, Manely, Couch's Mill, West Taphouse and Middle Taphouse. The division covers 8,855 hectares in total.

== Election results ==
=== 2017 election ===
2017 election: Lostwithiel
Party	Candidate	Votes	%	±%
Liberal Democrats	Colin Martin	873	50.9	
Conservative	Clay Cowie	685	39.9	
UKIP	Nigel Challis	145	8.5	
Majority		188	11.0	
Rejected ballots		12	0.7	
Turnout		1715	50.6	
Liberal Democrats gain from Conservative		Swing		

=== 2013 election ===
2013 election: Lostwithiel
Party	Candidate	Votes	%	±%
Conservative	Benedicte Bay	442	47.9	
UKIP	Nigel Challis	354	38.4	
Liberal Democrats	Marian Candy	113	12.3	
Majority		88	9.5	
Rejected ballots		13	1.4	
Turnout		922	27.1	
Conservative hold		Swing		

=== 2009 election ===
2009 election: Lostwithiel
Party	Candidate	Votes	%	±%
Conservative	Peter Shakerley	581	30.6	
Independent	Robert Peareth	460	24.3	
Mebyon Kernow	Julie Tamblin	270	14.2	
Independent	Ken Robertson	253	13.3	
UKIP	Richard Binstead	167	8.8	
Liberal Democrats	Deborah Earl	159	8.4	
Majority		121	6.4	
Rejected ballots		6	0.3	
Turnout		1896	49.6	
Conservative win (new seat)				
