= Goss Moor =

Nature reserve in Cornwall

Goss and Tregoss Moors
- Site of Special Scientific Interest
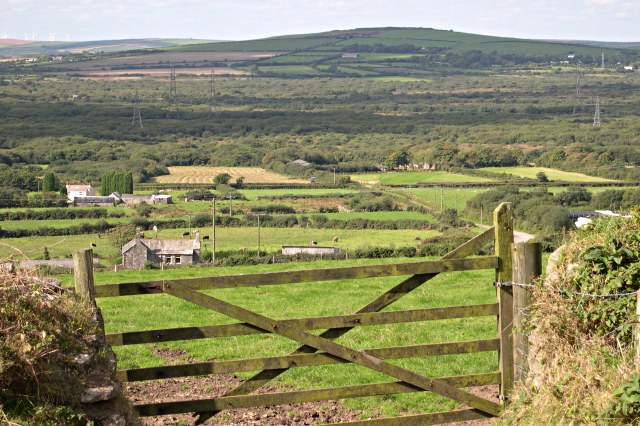
- View over Goss Moor

- Location within Cornwall Location within England
- Location of Goss and Tregoss Moors.
- Coordinates: 50.4047°N 4.8845°W
- Interest: Biological
- Area: 701.9 hectares (7.019 km^{2}; 2.710 sq mi)
- Notification date: 1988

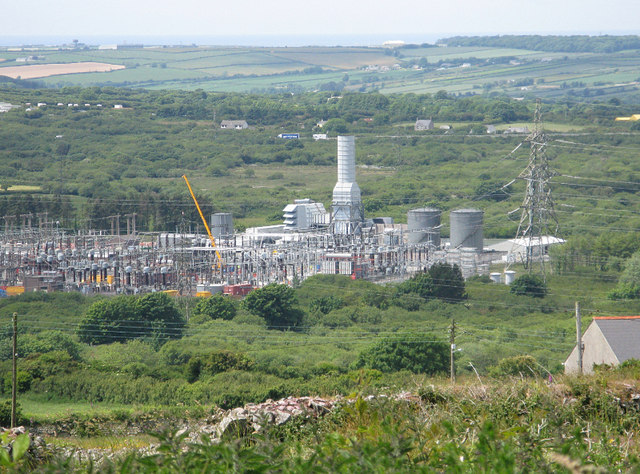
Indian Queens power station

Goss Moor (Cornish: Hal Gors, meaning moor of reeds, or Cornish: Kors Fala, moor of the Fal River) is a national nature reserve in Cornwall, England, 12 kilometres (7.5 mi) south-west of Bodmin in the parishes of St Dennis, St Columb Major, Roche and St Enoder. It is the largest continuous mire complex in south-west Britain and consists of mainly peatland and lowland heath. Together with the neighbouring moor to the east, it forms the Goss And Tregoss Moors Site of Special Scientific Interest (SSSI), as well as the Breney Common and Goss and Tregoss Moors Special Area of Conservation (SAC).

== History ==
Before 1838, Davies Gilbert wrote that the "flat country round it [St Dennis] is destroyed in the most efficacious manner, having been turned over and over again down to the solid rock, in what is termed streaming for tin". Between 1908 and 1916 steam powered suction and cutter dredges were used for the mining of alluvial tin on the moor. Drilling took place in 1908 and 1909 but the position of the boreholes and what they contained have been lost. Approximately 70 tons of tin concentrate was extracted and the dredges were later moved to Breney Common, Molinnis and Red Moor. The area was designated as the Goss and Tregoss Moors Site of Special Scientific Interest in 1988.

Matthew Taylor, who had been Member of Parliament for Truro and St Austell from 1987 to 2010, chose the title Baron Taylor of Goss Moor when he was appointed a life peer in the 2010 Dissolution Honours.

== Geography ==
Goss Moor is 12 kilometres (7.5 mi) south-west of Bodmin and is overlooked by Castle an Dinas to the north, and the church of St Dennis in the south. The River Fal rises on the moor at Pentivale and flows 17 kilometres (11 mi) to the English Channel at Carrick Roads. The A30 road once ran through the middle of Goss Moor. This was a major bottleneck for traffic and had been subject to a long running campaign for expansion which was strongly opposed. In late 2004 a decision was finally reached and the dual carriageway running to the north of moor was opened on 25 June 2007. Much of the existing road is now converted to a cycle lane which opened on 11 May 2008. The Atlantic Coast railway line between Par and Newquay also crosses Goss Moor.

== Scarce or rare species ==
It is home to a number of scarce and rare species including:

plants
yellow centaury (Cicendia filiformis), marsh clubmoss.
invertebrates
small red and variable damselfly.
butterflies
silver-studded blue, marsh fritillary, small pearl-bordered fritillary, grizzled skipper
moths
narrow-bordered bee hawk and double line.

A 2003 study found twelve different poor fen sub-communities.
