= Frances Margery Hext =

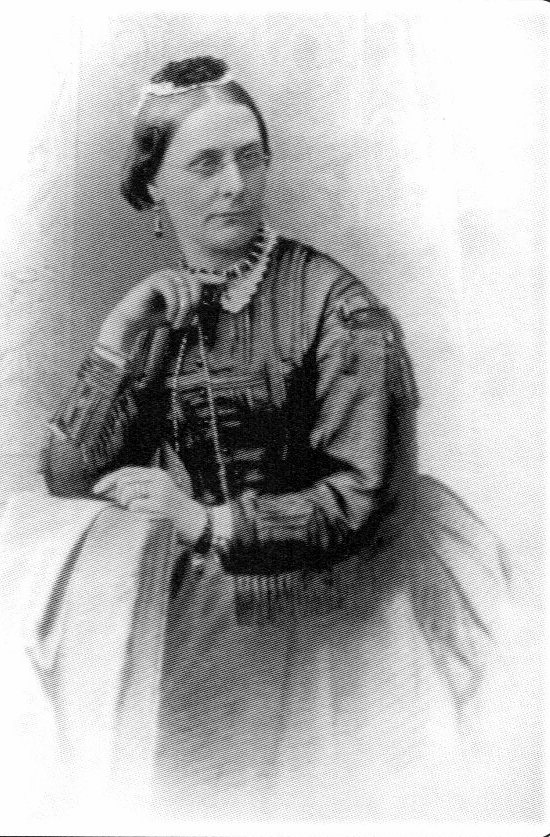
- Frances Margery Hext
- Born: 1819; Lanlivery, Cornwall, England
- Died: 10 January 1896 (aged 76–77); Lostwithiel, Cornwall, England
- Parent(s): John Hext; Elizabeth Staniforth

Frances Margery Hext (1819–1896) was a local historian and author from Lostwithiel, Cornwall, best known for her work Memorials of Lostwithiel [and of Restormell], which continues to be referenced in studies of the history of Cornwall.

== Biography ==
Frances Margery Hext was born in 1819 to John Hext and his wife Elizabeth (née Staniforth). Her mother was the daughter of Thomas Staniforth, Lord Mayor of Liverpool from 1797–98 and her brother Samuel Staniforth held the same position in 1812–13. Her father is described as having inherited the family estates from his brother, and was also deputy lieutenant and deputy warden of the Stannaries. He was also a magistrate for Cornwall. Hext was also the great grand niece of Reverend Cox Macro, notable for the Macro Manuscript. Her sister Gertrude Parsons (1812 –1891), was a Roman Catholic convert and writer.

In 1882 the head of a 14th century cross was discovered in a garden in Lostwithiel. Hext paid to have the cross restored and fixed to its former shaft in the churchyard of St Bartholomew's Church.

Hext who remained unmarried is recorded in the 1871 Census as living with her widower brother Thomas Hext and his three children in St Austell. She died at her home on Queen Street, Lostwithiel on 10 January 1896.

== Writings ==
Hext wrote and published a number of books of local significance, not only regarding the Staniforth and Hext families, but also regarding Cornish life more generally. In 1891 she published Memorials of Lostwithiel [and of Restormell]: collected and contributed. Taken from the writings of Leland, Carew ... and others. This book continues to be referenced in historical studies of Cornwall, particularly its church monuments, and royal buildings. Other notable writings include her 1863 book Staniforthiana: or, Recollections of the family of Staniforth of Darnall, in Yorkshire which combined research provided by Joseph Hunter with personal family stories.

== Publications ==
- Staniforthiana: or, Recollections of the family of Staniforth of Darnall, in Yorkshire (1863) (republished and revised by Nathan James Staniforth in 2019)
- Memorials of Lostwithiel [and of Restormell]: collected and contributed. Taken from the writings of Leland, Carew ... and others (1891)
