= Red Moor (nature reserve) =

Nature reserve in Cornwall, England

- Site of Special Scientific Interest
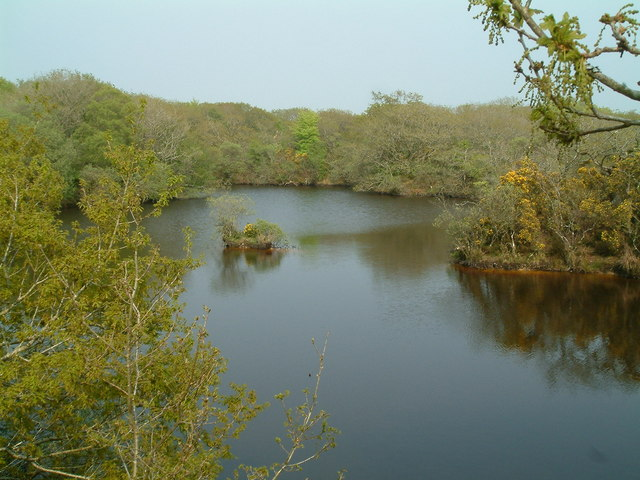
- The ponds to the north of Red Moor SSSI, created from old tin mining pits

- Location within Cornwall Location within England
- Location of Red Moor.
- Area of search: Cornwall
- Grid reference: SX072613
- Coordinates: 50.4194°N 4.7151°W
- Interest: Biological
- Area: 89.1 hectares (0.8910 km^{2}; 0.3440 sq mi)
- Notification date: 1979

Red Moor (Cornish: Hal Gors, meaning moor of reeds) is a nature reserve and Site of Special Scientific Interest (SSSI), noted for its biological characteristics, near Lanlivery in mid Cornwall, England, UK.

== Geography ==
The 89-hectare (220-acre) SSSI, notified in 1979, is located mainly within Lanlivery civil parish, 2 miles (3.2 km) north-west of the town of Lostwithiel. The similarly named hamlet of Redmoor is directly east of the reserve.

The nature reserve is owned by the Cornwall Wildlife Trust/Cornwall Trust for Nature.

== History ==
The river coursing out of the north of the site, a tributary of the River Par, was found to flow through tin-bearing gravels by the early mediaeval period. This part of Red Moor was mined for loose tin until the end of the 19th century and the oxidised metal is thought to give the moor its descriptive name.

This SSSI used to belong to the Red Moor–Breney Common SSSI, the two sites having split in the 1986 revision where both sites were expanded. It is adjacent to Helman Tor nature reserve.

== Flora and fauna ==
There are two main habitat types within the site; the dry dwarf-shrub heath to the north and wetter marshy grassland, wetland heath and bog-land in the low-lying basin to the south. The bog contains a variety of Sphagnum peat mosses - that disperse their spores from June to August - bog asphodel (Narthecium ossifragum), cottongrass (Eriophorum vaginatum), and marsh cinquefoil (Potentilla palustris). Other flora on the site include the climbing corydalis (Ceratocapnos claviculata) and the royal fern (Osmunda regalis).

On the site can be found 13 species of dragonfly and damselfly, which include the scarce blue-tailed damselfly, a nationally rare species. Aquatic beetles are also present on the moor, the very scarce Hydrochus nitidicollis being one, as well as 2 uncommon spiders.

Birds recorded on the site include the willow tit, tree pipit, European nightjar and the Eurasian sparrowhawk.
