= Assizes =

Periodic courts held around England and Wales

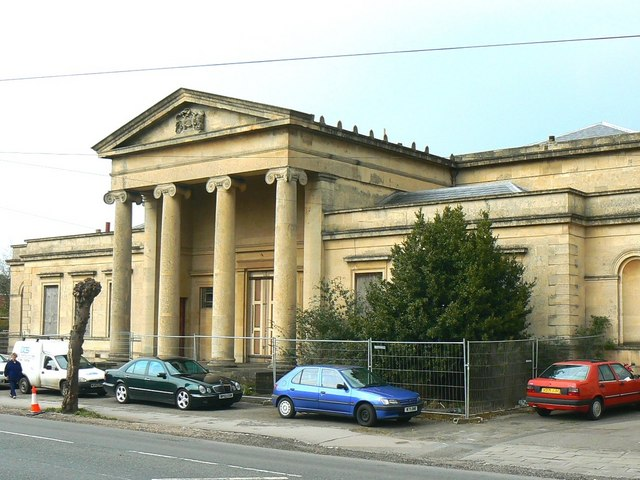
Devizes Assize Court, Northgate Street, Devizes, Wiltshire, England

The assizes (/əˈsaɪzɪz/), or courts of assize, were periodic courts held around England (and Wales after 1832) until 1972, when together with the quarter sessions they were abolished by the Courts Act 1971 and replaced by a single permanent Crown Court. The assizes exercised both civil and criminal jurisdiction, though most of their work was on the criminal side. The assizes heard the most serious cases, most notably those subject to capital punishment or, later, life imprisonment. Other serious cases were dealt with by the quarter sessions (local county courts held four times per year), while the more minor offences were dealt with summarily by justices of the peace in petty sessions (also known as magistrates' courts).

The word assize refers to the sittings or sessions (Old French assises) of the judges, known as "justices of assize", who were judges who travelled across the seven circuits of England and Wales on commissions of "oyer and terminer", setting up court and summoning juries at the various assize towns.

== Assizes of the Empire ==
Many colonies, territories, protectorates, dependencies, presidencies, and residencies of the British Empire possessed courts systems that included assizes. These included Straits Settlements, Massachusetts Bay Colony, Province of New York, British South Africa, and many other places.

== Etymology ==
The courts of assize were the English equivalent of the still-existing French Cours d'assise. The term is derived by Middle English assise < Old French assise ("session, legal action" – past participle of asseoir, "to seat") < Vulgar Latin *assedēre < Latin assidēre ("to sit beside, aside, elsewhere") < ad + sedēre ("to sit").

== History ==
Diagram of common-law courts in England and Wales before the Judicature Acts

With the Assize of Clarendon of 1166 King Henry II established trial by jury by a grand assize of twelve knights in land disputes, and itinerant justices to set up county courts. Before Magna Carta was passed (enacted) in 1215, writs of assize had to be tried at Westminster or await trial at the septennial circuit of justices in eyre. The great charter provided for land disputes to be tried by annual assizes at more convenient places. This work soon expanded, becoming five commissions. In 1293, a statute was enacted which formally defined four assize circuits.

For centuries, many justices of the Court of King's Bench, those of the Court of Common Pleas, and barons of the Exchequer of Pleas in some seasons of the year travelled around the country contributing to five commissions: their civil commissions were those of assize and of nisi prius; their criminal law commissions were those of the peace, of oyer and terminer and for jail delivery (meaning clearing out of prisoners).

The second commission heard cases which plaintiffs sought to receive priority. From an Act passed in the reign of King Edward I plaintiffs (claimants) could file pleadings at Westminster for the court to issue a writ to summon a jury to Westminster to appoint a time and place for hearing the causes there, stating the county of origin. Such writs used the words and form of nisi prius (Latin: "unless before"). The writ called the parties to Westminster (on a longstop date) unless the king's justices had assembled a court in the county to deal with the case beforehand.

The commission of oyer and terminer was a general commission to hear and decide cases. The commission of jail delivery required the justices to try all prisoners not yet tried by judges held in the jails.

Historically, all justices who visited Cornwall were also permanent members of the Prince's Council, which oversees the Duchy and advises the Duke. Before the creation of the Duchy, the Earls of Cornwall had control over the assizes. In the 13th century Richard, 1st Earl of Cornwall, feted as 'King of the Romans', moved the assizes to the new administrative palace complex in Lostwithiel but they later returned to Launceston.

=== 19th and 20th centuries ===
Few substantial changes occurred until the 19th century. From 1832 onwards, Wales and the palatine county of Chester, served by the Court of Great Sessions, were merged into the circuit system. The commissions for (the City of) London and Middlesex were replaced with a Central Criminal Court, serving London's broadened metropolis, and county courts were established widely to hear many civil cases which had taken the writ-action form of nisi prius.

The Supreme Court of Judicature Act 1873, which merged judges of equity and common law competing systems into the Supreme Court of Judicature, transferred the jurisdiction of the commissions of assize (e.g. the possessory assizes that heard actions relating to the dispossession of land) to the High Court of Justice, and established district registries of the High Court across the country, leaving a minimal civil jurisdiction to the (travelling) assizes.

In 1956, crown courts were set up in Liverpool and Manchester, replacing the assizes and quarter sessions. This was extended nationwide in 1972 following the recommendations of a royal commission.

== Circuits ==
From 1293, sets of judges toured across four circuits; from 1328, six circuits which changed in content until an extra was added in 1876. As at 1831 they were:

- The Home Circuit: the Home Counties of Hertfordshire, Essex, Kent, Sussex and Surrey. The Lent assizes were held at Hertford, Chelmsford, Rochester (alternately with Maidstone), Horsham and Kingston upon Thames, generally attended in that order. The summer assizes were held at Maidstone, Lewes and either Croydon or Guildford, generally attended in that order.
- The Midland Circuit: Northamptonshire, Rutland, Lincolnshire, Nottinghamshire, Derbyshire, Leicestershire, and Warwickshire. The assizes were held at Northampton, Oakham, Lincoln, Nottingham, Derby, Leicester, Coventry and Warwick, generally attended in that order.
- The Norfolk Circuit: Buckinghamshire, Bedfordshire, Huntingdonshire, Cambridgeshire, Suffolk and Norfolk. The Lent assizes were held at Aylesbury, Bedford, Huntingdon, Cambridge, Bury St Edmunds and Thetford, generally attended in that order. The summer assizes were held at Buckingham, the middle four aforesaid and Norwich, generally attended in that order.
- The Northern Circuit: Yorkshire, Lancashire, County Durham, Northumberland, Cumberland and Westmorland. The Lent assizes were held at York and Lancaster, generally attended in that order. The summer assizes were held at York, Durham, Newcastle, Carlisle and Appleby, generally attended in that order.
- The Oxford Circuit: Berkshire, Oxfordshire, Worcestershire, Staffordshire, Shropshire, Herefordshire, Monmouthshire and Gloucestershire. The Lent assizes were held at Reading, Oxford, Worcester, Stafford, Shrewsbury, Hereford, Monmouth and Gloucester, generally attended in that order. The summer assizes were almost the same, substituting Abingdon for Reading.
- The Western Circuit: Hampshire, Wiltshire, Dorset, Devon, Cornwall and Somerset. The Lent assizes were held at Winchester, Salisbury, Dorchester, Exeter, Launceston, Taunton and Bristol, generally attended in that order. The summer assizes were held at the first four aforesaid then Bodmin or Truro, and then Wells or Bridgwater, generally attended in that order.

Yorkshire was for a time removed from the Northern Circuit and placed on the Midland Circuit.

The North-eastern Circuit was formed in 1876 and contained Yorkshire, Durham and Northumberland. By 1960 these seven circuits saw no longer a Home nor a Norfolk Circuit, instead a South-eastern Circuit and a Wales and Chester Circuit. In 1972, the Midland Circuit and the Oxford Circuit were combined and became the Midland and Oxford Circuit.

Each had its own bar and mess (also called a circuit mess or bar mess). The mess was a society of those jurists practising on the circuit. The bar was its barristers' subset.

Circuits continue today with similar functions as professional associations for barristers and administrative divisions for judges.

== Assize records ==
The National Archives holds most of the surviving historical records of the assizes.
