= St Brevita's Church, Lanlivery =

St Brevita's Church
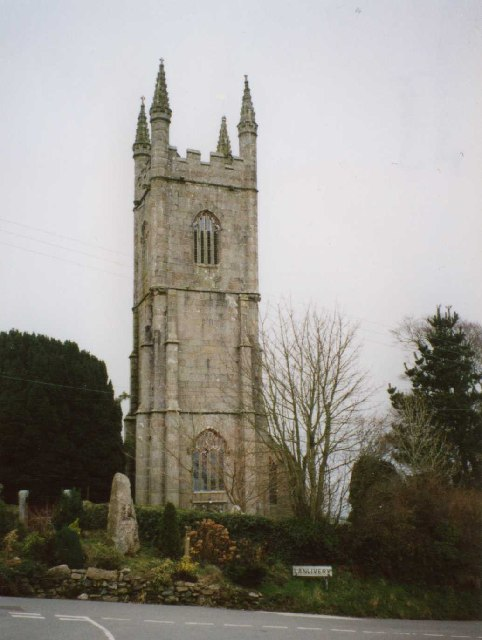
- St Brevita's Church

- Location within Cornwall
- 50°24′00″N 04°42′14″W
- OS grid reference: SX 07991 59046
- Location: Lanlivery, Cornwall
- Country: England
- Denomination: Church of England

History
- Dedication: Saint Bryvyth/Brevita

Architecture
- Years built: 14th-15th centuries

Administration
- Province: Canterbury
- Diocese: Truro
- Archdeaconry: Bodmin
- Parish: Lanlivery

Listed Building – Grade I
- Official name: Church of St Brevita
- Designated: 10 February 1967
- Reference no.: 1137701

St Brevita's Church is a Grade I listed medieval parish church of the Church of England in Lanlivery, Cornwall. The church was built in the 14th and 15th centuries in the Perpendicular Gothic style, and is dedicated to Saint Bryvyth, or Brevita. Bryvyth's veneration is unique to Lanlivery and nothing is known about her. The churchyard contains multiple monuments, listed separately from the church itself.

== History ==
The church dates from the late 14th century, with the south aisle, porch, tower, and some alterations dating from the mid 15th century.

The dedication to Saint Bryvyth, or Brevita, is unique, and nothing else is known about this saint. Bryvyth is mentioned in three pre-Reformation sources; one such early source designates her as male, although other sources generally consider her female. Bryvyth was first mentioned in 1423 as Briueta, again in 1473 as Breutta, in 1539 as Bryvyth, and in 1763 as Brevita. The reference to her in 1763 may be based on an undiscovered medieval document.

In 1870 and 1887, Saint Bryvyth's feast day was celebrated on the first Sunday after the first Tuesday in May, but her original feast day is uncertain. A nearby holy well is dedicated to her. The parish celebrates her feast day by dressing the holy well.

In 1858, Samuel Lewis described St Brevita's Church as a "handsome structure of granite, in the later English style, with a lofty embattled tower crowned by pinnacles, and consists of two spacious aisles, separated by a central range of clustered columns."

The Saints' Way pilgrimage passes through Lanlivery, and includes St Brevita's Church.

In recent years, the parish community has set up a community library in the church and undertaken refurbishment of the building, to provide a better space for non-religious community events. Such events have included concerts, seasonal gardening projects, and holidays.

The church is in a joint benefice with the parish churches of Boconnoc, St Winnow, St Veep, Braddock, and Lostwithiel.

== Description ==
St Brevita's Church was built in the Perpendicular style out of granite rubble and ashlar. The current church dates originally from the late 14th century, with the bulk of the structure dating from the 15th century. In the 19th century, restoration was carried out, which included adding the current pews and pulpit. The interior of the church also contains numerous memorials dating from the 17th, 18th, and 19th centuries.

The organ dated from 1888 and was originally installed in the Methodist Central Hall in St Blazey. It was moved to St Brevita's Church in 1994. A specification of the organ can be found in the National Pipe Organ Register.

The tower contains a peal of 8 bells.

=== Monuments ===
Out of approximately 222 memorials, the churchyard of St Brevita contains numerous Grade II listed monuments:

- A chest tomb for the Kendall family, dated to the late 17th or early 18th century
- A likely 17th-century sarcophagus, possibly taken from the interior of the church
- A row of three early 19th-century tombstones, decorated with cherubs
- The grave of married couple John and Grace Siers, dated to 1786 and 1818 respectively
- The grave of Benjamin Sturtridge, decorated with numerous symbolic carvings, dated 1768
- An unidentified 18th-century chest tomb made of granite and limestone
- Another unidentified 18th-century chest tomb, made of granite and slate with an illegible inscription
