= St Cyricius and St Julietta's Church, St Veep =

St Cyricius and St Julietta's Church
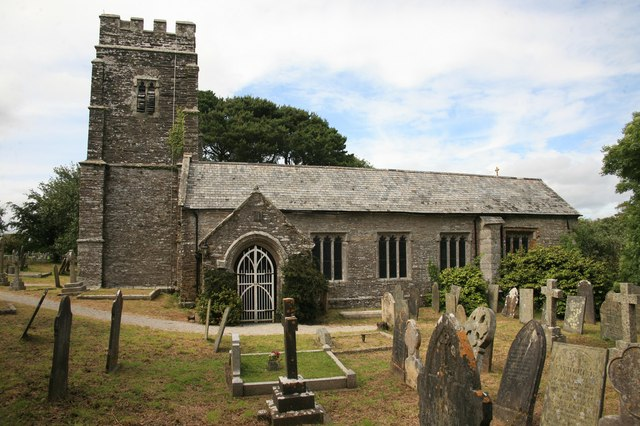
- St Cyricius and St Julietta's Church, St Veep

- Location within Cornwall
- 50°21′55.4″N 4°37′0″W
- Location: St Veep, Cornwall
- Country: England
- Denomination: Church of England

History
- Dedication: Cyricus and Julitta

Administration
- Province: Canterbury
- Diocese: Truro
- Archdeaconry: Bodmin
- Deanery: Trigg Minor and Bodmin
- Parish: St Veep

Listed Building – Grade I
- Official name: Church of St Ciricus and Julitta
- Designated: 21 August 1964
- Reference no.: 1140311

St Cyricius and St Julietta's Church, St Veep is a Grade I listed parish church of Church of England in St Veep, Cornwall.

== History and description ==
The parish church was originally dedicated to Saint Veep; the building was cruciform in design and in 1269 belonged to Montacute Priory in Somerset. Nothing remains of the church from this period.

It was rebuilt in 1336 and rededicated to Saint Quiricus and Saint Julietta. The west tower appears to date from this rebuilding, but the rest of the church is late 15th century or early 16th century. Dendrochronological dating suggests c. 1460 for the nave and chancel roofs, but as late as 1540 for the north aisle roof.

Following the Prayer Book Rebellion of 1549, a number of well-known Cornish figures and priests were murdered or hanged in Cornwall. These included Richard Bennet, vicar of St Veep, under the direct orders of Anthony Kingston, Provost Marshal serving under King Edward VI.

Valuable church silverware, which had been deposited with Lloyds Bank of St Austell and subsequently lost, was rediscovered in 2015 at a storage facility near Glasgow. Items included a communion cup (dated 1579), silver flagon tankard (1737) and a silver plate (1738).

== Parish status ==
The church is in a joint benefice with:

- St Brevita’s Church, Lanlivery
- St Winnow’s Church, St Winnow
- Boconnoc Church
- St Mary the Virgin's Church, Braddock
- St Nectan's Chapel, St Winnow
- St Bartholomew's Church, Lostwithiel

== Monuments ==
- Nicholas Courtney (d. 1589)

== Organ ==
The organ has a pipe organ which was extensively rebuilt by J.W. Walker and Sons in 1871. A specification of the organ can be found in the National Pipe Organ Register.

== Bells ==
The tower contains a peal of 6 bells all dating from 1770 by Pennington and Company. These were all cast in the churchyard and are the only known example in England of a Virgin Peal, in that they came out of the cast perfectly tuned.
