= Hext =

Hext may refer to:

== Places ==
- Hext, Oklahoma
- Hext, Texas

== Other uses ==
- Hext (surname)
