= Redmoor, Cornwall =

Hamlet in Cornwall, England

Coordinates: 50.4199°N 4.7041°W

Redmoor (Cornish: Halgors) is a hamlet in Cornwall, England, United Kingdom.

== Geography ==
Redmoor is located 2 kilometres (1.2 mi) northwest of Lostwithiel in the civil parish of Lanlivery. Red Moor, along with Helman Tor, Breney Common, and Belowda Beacon, is part of the Mid Cornwall Moors Site of Special Scientific Interest designated both for biological and geological interest. It is also within the Mid Cornwall Moors National Nature Reserve, designated by Natural England in May 2026.
