= St Winnow's Church, St Winnow =

St Winnow's Church
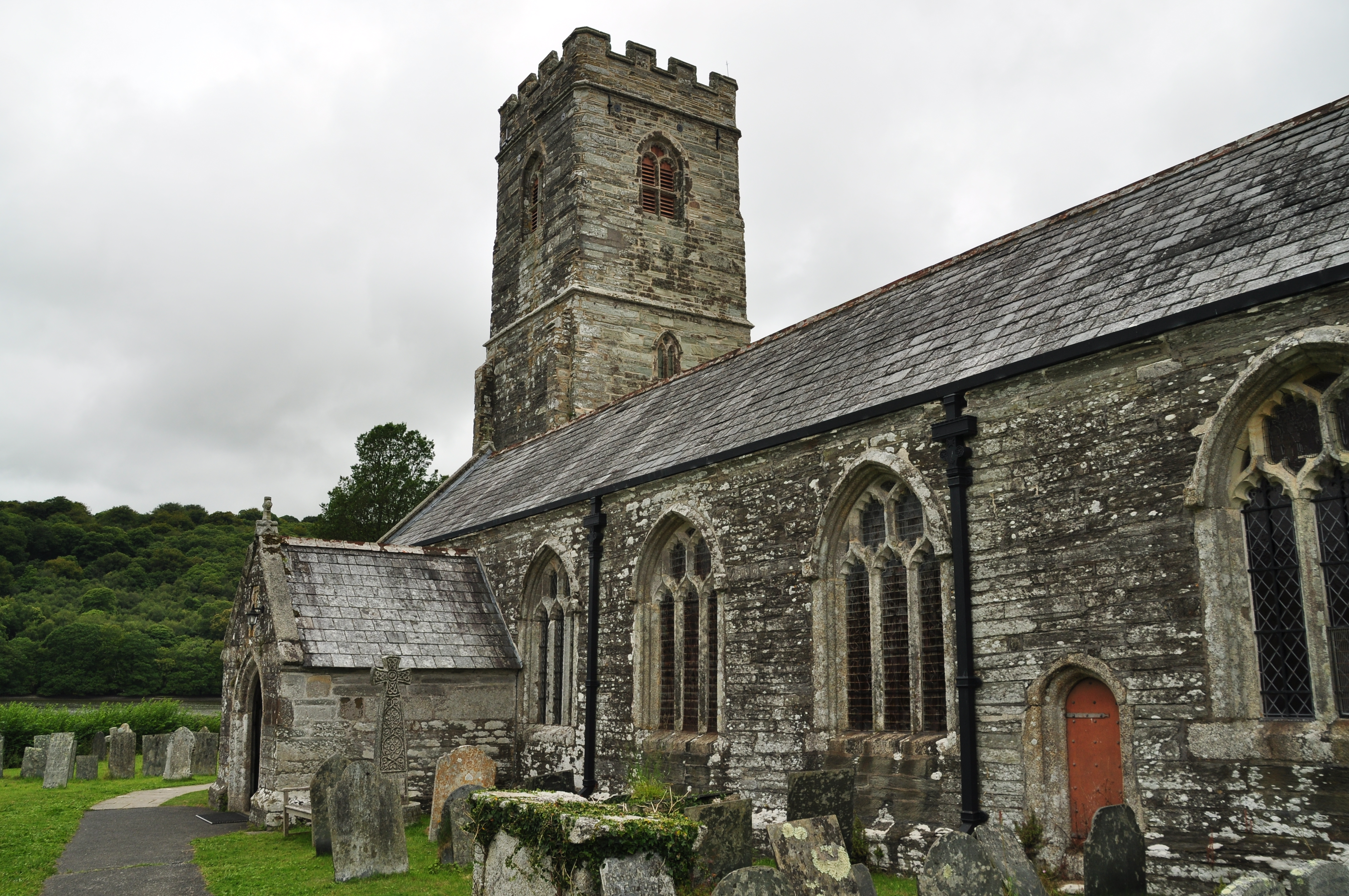

- Location within Cornwall
- 50°26′56″N 04°39′07″W
- Location: St Winnow, Cornwall
- Country: England
- Denomination: Church of England

Administration
- Diocese: Truro
- Archdeaconry: Bodmin
- Deanery: Trigg Minor and Bodmin
- Parish: Saint Winnow with St Nectan’s Chapel

St Winnow's Church, St Winnow is a Grade I listed parish church in St Winnow, Cornwall, England. The present building dates primarily from the 15th century, incorporating earlier Norman fabric, and includes a west tower and south aisle added in the later Middle Ages. The church is known for its early 16th-century rood screen, medieval stained glass, carved bench ends, and an unusual tower containing two separate peals of bells.

== History ==
St Winnow’s Church retains Norman fabric in the north walls of the nave, north transept, and chancel. It was partly rebuilt in the 13th century and enlarged in the 15th by the addition of a south aisle, porch, and tower. Sections of the north wall were rebuilt again in the late 19th century.

The south aisle was constructed as a chantry for the Lords of Ethy, and the rood screen, dating from about 1520. The chancel was restored by J. D. Sedding between 1873 and 1874. Polyphant Stone windows were inserted in the chancel and nave, and the chancel was reroofed in oak and refitted with stalls and encaustic and glazed tiled flooring. The nave was reseated in pitch pine, and the rood screen was restored and repositioned.

== Architecture ==
=== Structure and exterior ===
The church is built of rubble stone, with coursed stone used in the south aisle, porch, and tower base. The tower has a moulded granite plinth; the south aisle and porch have plain plinths, while the nave, chancel, and north transept have none. The roofs are of slate, with the nave and chancel under a continuous roof and a six-bay south aisle of equal length.

The tower is of three stages, with stepped buttresses and an embattled parapet. Belfry openings on all four faces are two-light with cusped heads and louvres beneath two-centred arches. The west doorway has a granite two-centred arch, and above it is a 19th-century three-light Perpendicular window.

The north transept retains early Perpendicular tracery and a 13th-century two-light window. The chancel and aisle windows are largely Perpendicular, with some 19th-century rebuilding and restoration. The south aisle east window has four lights beneath a four-centred arch, with partially renewed tracery. The south porch entrance has a two-centred arch with moulding similar to that of the south priest’s door.

=== Interior ===
The interior is a plan typical of Perpendicular churches in Cornwall. It has a six-bay granite arcade to the south aisle with moulded octagonal capitals. Wagon roofs with moulded ribs and carved bosses cover the nave, chancel, south aisle, and porch. The north transept arch was rebuilt in the 13th century, and the tower arch is partly blocked.

The church has a one-manual organ with nine speaking stops; its specification is listed in the National Pipe Organ Register.

== Bells ==
The tower unusually contains two peals of bells. The oldest peal of six is now inoperable due to the structural stresses it places on the building. It includes one bell dated 1754, two dated 1771, and one each from 1790, 1864, and 1899. In 2017, a new peal of ten bells was installed lower in the tower beneath the earlier ring. These were cast by the Royal Eijsbouts bell foundry in the Netherlands.

=== Fittings, furnishings, monuments, and glass ===
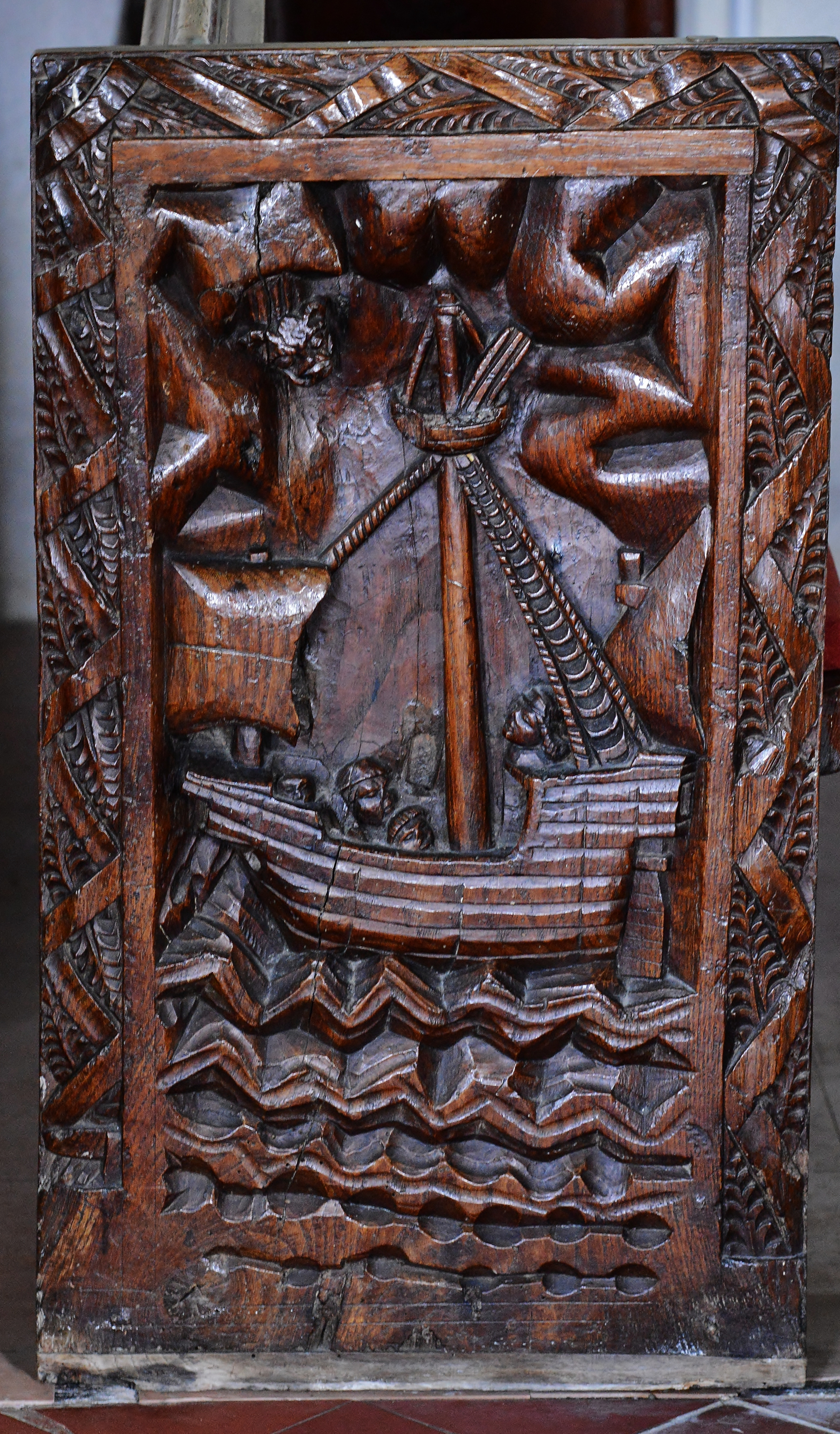
Carved bench end, St Winnow's Church

The church retains a richly carved rood screen of about 1520 extending across the east end of the nave and south aisle. Its base is decorated with carved foliage and flowers, and figures of the Crucifixion, the Virgin, and St John were added above in 1918.

Bench ends of the 16th and early 17th centuries survive, carved with vernacular scenes, including a sailing ship in a storm and a man drinking. The granite font, probably of the 15th century, has an inscribed round bowl supported on attached shafts and an octagonal base, with a 17th-century oak cover. The octagonal oak pulpit dates from about 1620 and is richly carved.

Painted boards include a letter from King Charles I displayed in the tower arch and a parish board dated 1775.

The south aisle east window contains stained glass of about 1500 associated with the Ethy chantry and restored in 1867. Medieval glass fragments survive in the chancel east window and north chancel windows. Two east windows retain original medieval glass depicting saints and figures in period costume.

Memorials include slate stones to Edmund Dyer (1722) and William Sawle (d. 1651), together with later monuments. The monument to William Sawle (d. 1651) bears an epitaph forming an anagram of his name:: “I was ill: am wel.”

== Parish status ==
The church is in a joint benefice with:

- Boconnoc Church
- St Mary the Virgin's Church, Braddock
- St Cyricius and St Julietta's Church, St Veep
- St Brevita’s Church, Lanlivery
- St Nectan’s Chapel, St Winnow
- St Bartholomew's Church, Lostwithiel
