= St Bartholomew's Church, Lostwithiel =

St. Bartholomew's Church, Lostwithiel
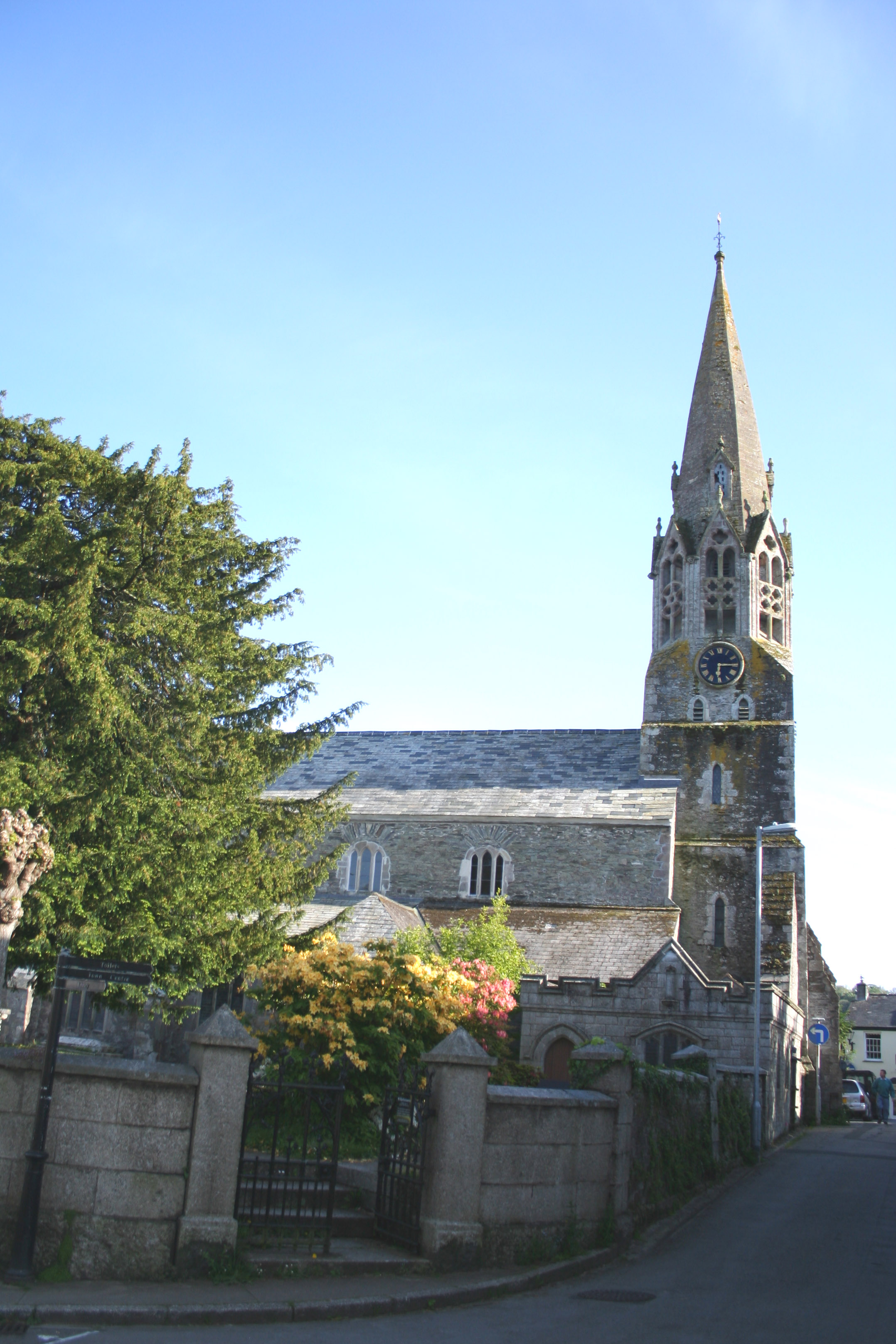
- St. Bartholomew's Church, Lostwithiel

- Location within Cornwall
- 50°24′27″N 04°40′09″W
- OS grid reference: SX 104 598
- Location: Lostwithiel, Cornwall
- Country: England
- Denomination: Church of England
- Churchmanship: Broad Church

History
- Dedication: St. Bartholomew

Administration
- Province: Canterbury
- Diocese: Truro
- Archdeaconry: Bodmin
- Deanery: Trigg Minor and Bodmin
- Parish: Lostwithiel

Listed Building – Grade I
- Official name: Church of St Bartholomew
- Designated: 18 October 1949
- Reference no.: 1327333

St Bartholomew's Church is a parish church of the Church of England Diocese of Truro in Lostwithiel, Cornwall, England, United Kingdom.

== Background ==
The earliest part of the church is the tower which dates from the 13th century. The spire was added in the early 14th century, and the rest of the church dates from the later 14th century.

The spire has an octagonal screen around its foot, with former windows on four of its eight sides. Built of Pentewan stone, is the outstanding feature of this sizable town church. The north side has a St Catherine's Wheel. Unusually for a Cornish church there is a clerestory above the nave. There are some fine monuments of Georgian period and a brass of 1423. The east window of five lights is one of the most notable in Cornwall, of the same date as the spire. The early fourteenth century font is outstanding, with carved figures of a huntsman and hawk, a head with leaves sprouting from its mouth, an evil face, a wolf and hounds, and lions.

The church was restored in 1878 and 1879 by a Lostwithiel firm of builders, Messrs Phelp and Brown. The architect for the work was Mr Clark of London. The exterior of the building was renovated, plaster ceiling removed and the interior was stripped of ″pew monstrosities″. An open-timbered roof of pitch pine was erected along with new floors and the new carvings was carried out by Harry Hems of Ecclesiastical Art Works, Exeter. The restoration cost £1,200 (equivalent to £128,900 in 2025), and the church was reopened on 29 May 1879 with a service by Archdeacon Hobhouse.

In 1894 the organ was enlarged, and this required the construction of a new vestry for the clergy and choir in the north-west corner under the spire. This was designed by Edmund Sedding and built at a cost of £200 (equivalent to £22,500 in 2025).

== Organ ==
The organ was built by Brewer of Truro c.1888, using pipes from an earlier manual organ by Alexander Buckingham in 1828. It has subsequently been restored by Osmonds of Taunton and, in 1992, by Lance Foy of Truro. A specification of the organ can be found on the National Pipe Organ Register.

== Bells ==
The tower contains a peal of 6 bells by Gillett & Johnston dating from 1924.

== Parish status ==
The church is in a joint benefice with:

- Boconnoc Church
- St Brevita’s Church, Lanlivery
- St Cyricius and St Julietta's Church, St Veep
- St Mary the Virgin's Church, Braddock
- St Nectan’s Chapel, St Winnow
- St Winnow’s Church, St Winnow

== Churchyard ==
In the churchyard is a grave of a member of the Hext family with a medieval lantern cross mounted on a modern shaft. The cross head was found in the 19th century at an unknown location and in 1882 set up in the churchyard, Local historian Frances Margery Hext paid to have the cross restored. It was later moved to its present position.
