= Hext (surname) =

Hext is a surname. Notable people with the surname include:

- Alice Hext (1865–1939), Cornish philanthropist, gardener and magistrate
- Frances Margery Hext (1819-1896), historian
- Gertrude Hext (1812-1891), Cornish writer
- John Hext (1842-1924), British naval officer
- Michael Hext (born 1961), British trombonist
- Suzanna Hext, British para swimmer and equestrian
- Tamara Hext (born 1963), American beauty queen from Texas
