= Gertrude Parsons =

English novelist, editor

- Born: Gertrude Hext; 19 March 1812; Restormel Manor, Lanlivery, Cornwall, England
- Died: 12 February 1891 (aged 78); Teignmouth

Gertrude Parsons (19 March 1812 – 12 February 1891) was a Roman Catholic convert who wrote numerous works in the nineteenth century. Born in Restormel, Cornwall, England, and growing up with eight brothers and sisters, she converted to Catholicism in 1844. She married Daniel Parsons in 1845, himself a recent convert to Catholicism, and the couple moved to Malvern Wells. There she wrote several novels, generally with underlying Catholic themes. She also started a Catholic periodical in 1865, which lasted just one year.

== Life ==
Gertrude Hext was born in Lanlivery near Lostwithiel, Cornwall, on 19 March 1812. Her father Captain John Hext, an army officer, and mother, Elizabeth Hext (née Staniforth), who was the daughter of the Liverpool politician Thomas Staniforth (1735–1803) had nine children including Frances Margery Hext (1819–1896), a historian and writer and Gertrude who was their fourth child. She converted to the Roman Catholic faith in 1844 before she married Daniel Parsons, son of the vicar of Sherborne the following year. Her husband was a curate who had converted to Catholicism in 1843. The couple moved to Malvern Wells in Worcestershire after they were married, and Gertrude Parsons became a benefactor of the mission at Little Malvern.

== Works ==
Parsons wrote several novels which all had underlying Catholic themes. For example, in Thornberry Abbey, a couple finding happiness in converting to Catholicism, whilst in Edith Mortimer, a girl who turns down her suitor because he is a Protestant. She also wrote Rhymes Gay and Grave in 1864.

The following year Parsons edited and largely wrote a magazine for Catholics called Workman, or, Life and Leisure and later the Literary Workman in 1865. The magazine failed to get a loyal readership and the initially weekly but later monthly publication ceased in the same year as it was launched. Parson's later works were simple romances which did not have the religious ties.

=== Bibliography ===
1. Thornberry Abbey: a Tale of the Established Church, 1846 (Note: The title was changed for the American edition to Thornberry Abbey: a Tale of the Times)
2. Joe Baker, 1853.
3. Edith Mortimer, or Trials of Life at Mortimer Manor, 1857.
4. Emma's Cross: a Tale, 1859.
5. George Morton, the Boy and the Man, 1859.
6. Afternoons with Mrs. Maitland: a Book of Household Instruction, 1860.
7. The Life of St. Ignatius of Loyola, 1860.
8. Dyrbington Court, or the Story of John Julian's Prosperity, 1861.
9. Ruth Baynard's Story, 1861. # The Romance of Cleaveside, 1867, 3 vols.
10. Ursula's Love Story, 1869, 3 vols.
11. Avice Arden: the Old Man's Romance, 1870.
12. Sun and Shade, 1871, 3 vols.
13. The Village of Downe: a short Chronicle, 1872.
14. Beautiful Edith, 1873, 3 vols.
15. The Story of Fordington Hall, 1873.
16. Twelve Tales for the Young, 1874.
17. Married Trust, 1874, 3 vols.
18. Major Vandermere, 1876, 3 vols.
19. Wrecked and Saved, 1878.
20. Under Temptation, 1878, 3 vols.
21. The Life of St. Colette, the Reformer of the Three Orders of St. Francis, 1879.
22. Love-knots, 1881, 3 vols.
23. The Sisters of Ladywell, 1881.
24. Thomas Rileton, his Family and Friends, 1890.
