= Milltown, Lanlivery =

Coordinates: 50.389°N 4.669°W

Milltown: Cornish: Trevelin
- Location within Cornwall
- OS grid reference: SX104577
- Civil parish: Lanlivery
- Unitary authority: Cornwall
- Ceremonial county: Cornwall
- Region: South West
- Country: England
- Sovereign state: United Kingdom

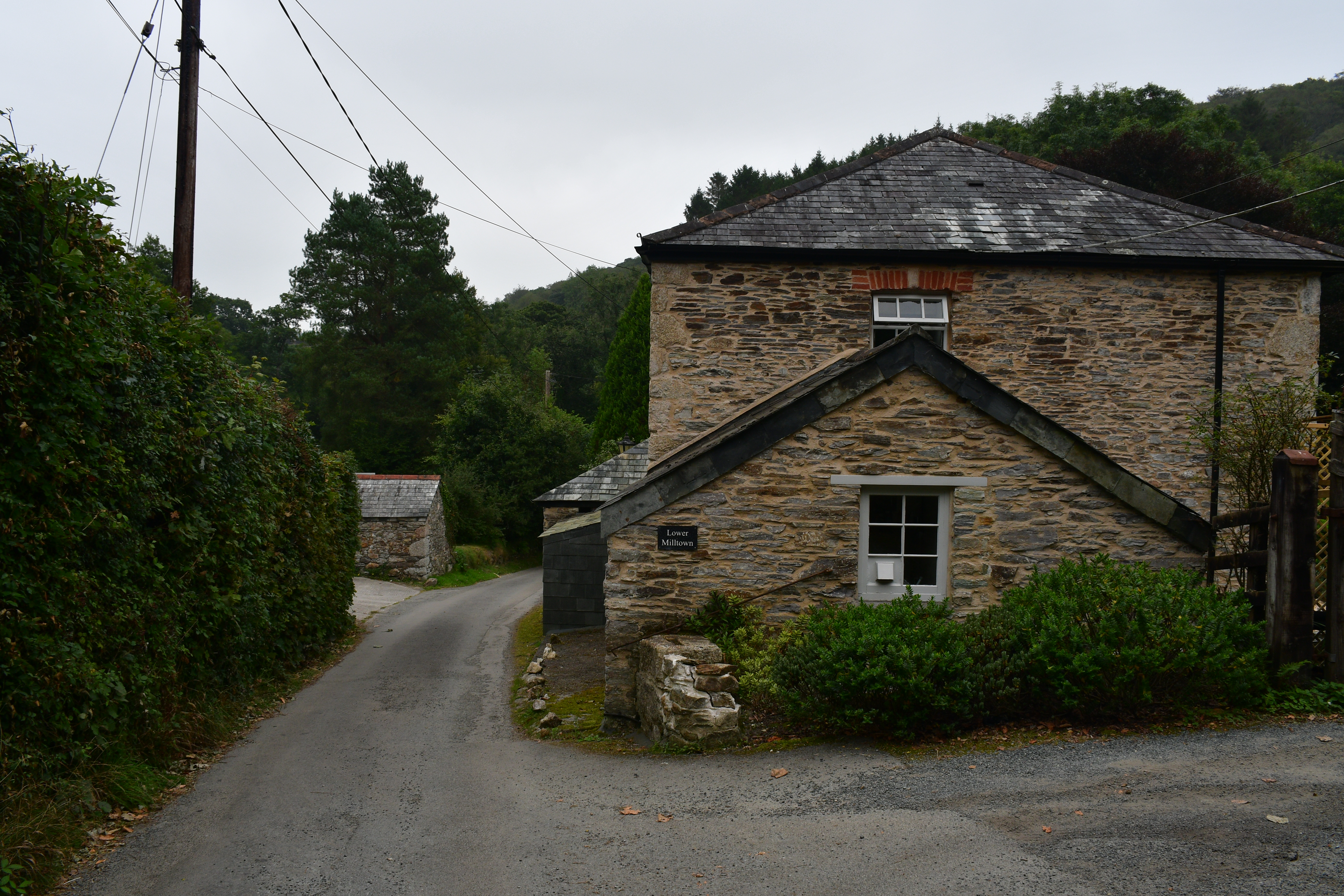

Milltown (Cornish: Trevelin) is a hamlet in Cornwall, England. It lies in Lanlivery civil parish, about a mile south of Lostwithiel, in the valley of a small tributary of the River Fowey.

Cornwall has another hamlet called Milltown, in the parish of Cardinham.
