= Lostwithiel Guildhall =

Municipal building in Lostwithiel, Cornwall, England

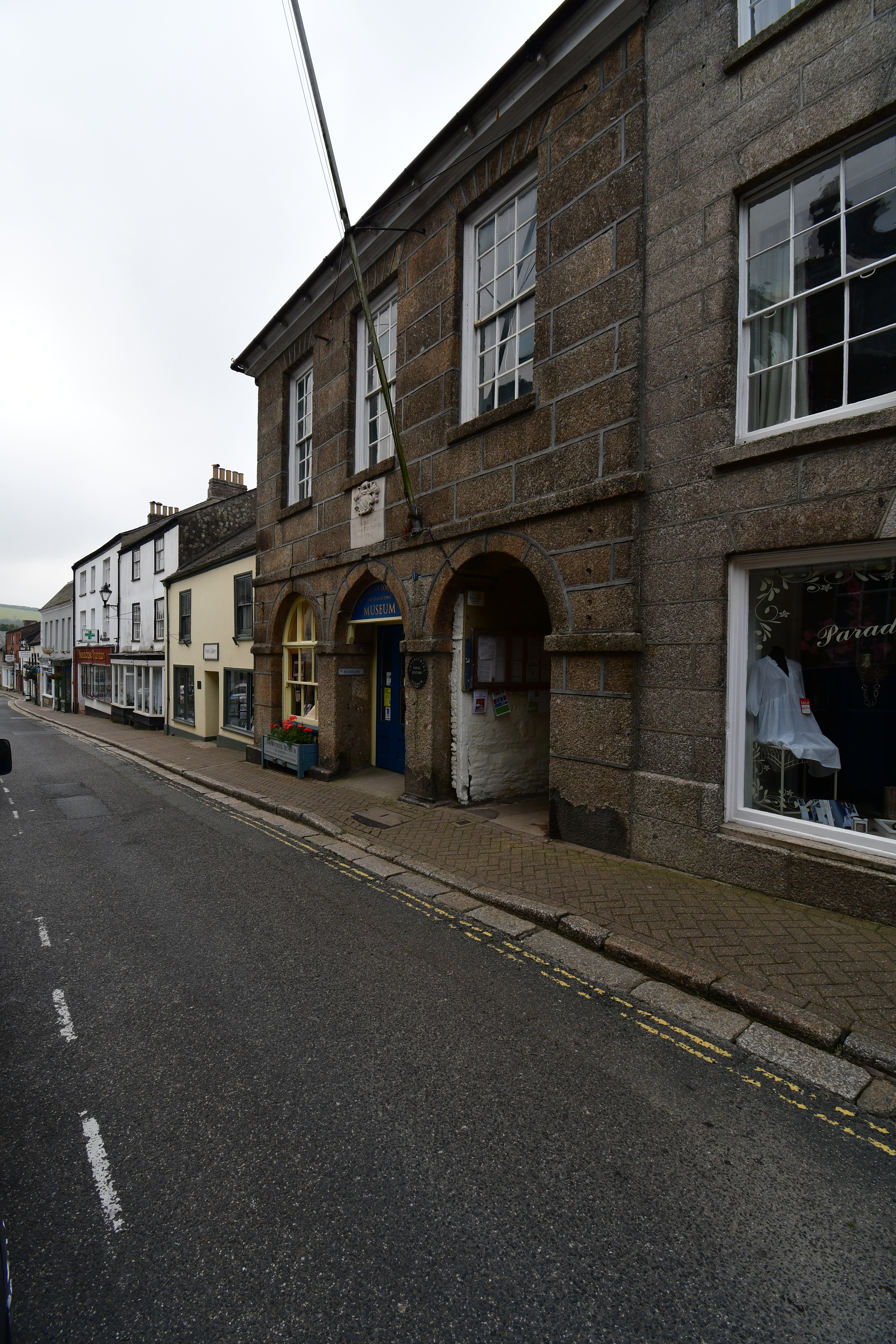
- Lostwithiel Guildhall

- Shown in Cornwall
- 50.4072°N 4.6702°W
- Location: Fore Street, Lostwithiel, Cornwall, England

History
- Built: 1740

Site notes
- Architectural style: Neoclassical style

Listed Building – Grade II
- Official name: Guildhall
- Designated: 18 October 1949
- Reference no.: 1144227

Lostwithiel Guildhall is a municipal building in Fore Street in Lostwithiel, Cornwall, England. The structure, which currently accommodates the local museum, is a Grade II listed building.

== History ==
The building was commissioned and paid for by the local member of parliament, Richard Edgcumbe, 1st Baron Edgcumbe, whose seat was at Mount Edgcumbe House. It was designed in the neoclassical style, built in ashlar granite and was completed in 1740.

The design involved a symmetrical main frontage of three bays facing onto Fore Street. The building was arcaded on the ground floor, so that markets could be held, with an assembly room on the first floor. The openings on the ground floor were formed by Doric order pilasters supporting voussoirs, while the first floor was fenestrated by sash windows. At roof level there was a modillioned cornice. A plaque, which was carved with the inscription "Richard Edgcumbe Esq erected this building Anno 1740" and surmounted by a shield, was installed above the central opening. Internally, the principal rooms were the corn exchange and lock-up on the ground floor, and the assembly room, which was panelled and equipped with a gallery and dais, on the first floor.

Lostwithiel had a very small electorate and a dominant patron, the Earls of Mount Edgcumbe, which meant it was recognised by the UK Parliament as a rotten borough. Its right to elect members of parliament was removed by the Reform Act 1832, and its borough council, which had met in the council chamber, was reformed under the Municipal Corporations Act 1883.

The use of the building as a corn exchange declined significantly in the wake of the Great Depression of British Agriculture in the late 19th century. However, it continued to operate as the venue for the occasional petty session hearings and for hearings of the "Court of the Maritime Water of Fowey" (which dealt with disputes over harbour duties), and even accommodated the local schoolroom. It also continued to serve as the local town hall, accommodating the offices and meetings of the borough council, although it ceased to be the local seat of government when St Austell Rural District Council was enlarged in 1968.

The building was repurposed as the home of the Lostwithiel Museum when it was opened by Edward Piers Edgcumbe, 7th Earl of Mount Edgcumbe on 21 August 1971. Exhibits accessioned to the collection include the local fire engine and a cloak worn by Police Sergeant Joseph Burnett who was murdered, while out on patrol, in 1814.

== See also ==
- Corn exchanges in England
