= St Veep =

Civil parish in Cornwall, England

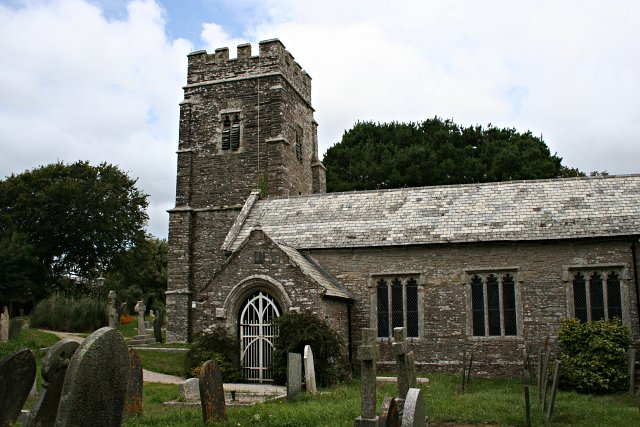
- St Veep Parish Church

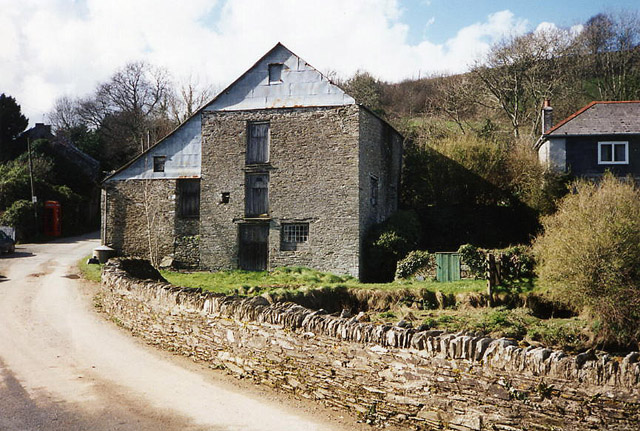
- Penpol Mill

- Location within Cornwall
- Population: 308 (2011 census including Lerryn)
- OS grid reference: SX139550
- Civil parish: St Veep
- Unitary authority: Cornwall
- Ceremonial county: Cornwall
- Region: South West
- Country: England
- Sovereign state: United Kingdom
- Post town: LOSTWITHIEL
- Postcode district: PL22
- Police: Devon and Cornwall
- Fire: Cornwall
- Ambulance: South Western
- UK Parliament: South East Cornwall

St Veep (Cornish: Sen Vip) is a civil parish in Cornwall, England, United Kingdom, situated above the east bank of the River Fowey about three miles (5 km) south-east of Lostwithiel. It is bordered by the parishes of St Winnow to the north-west, Boconnoc to the north, Lanreath to the east Polperro to the south-east and Lanteglos to the south. The River Fowey forms its western boundary. The parish is named after Saint Veep of whom little is known (not even whether the saint was male or female).

Part of the village of Lerryn is in St Veep parish. The hamlets of Cliff (50.369°N 4.634°W), Higher Penpol (50.360°N 4.616°W), Middle Penpol and Lower Penpol (50.360°N 4.607°W) are all within the parish.

== History ==
The parish church was originally dedicated to Saint Veep, but when it was rebuilt in 1336 it was rededicated to Saint Quiricus and Saint Julietta.

Following the Prayer Book Rebellion of 1549, a number of well-known Cornish figures and priests were murdered or hanged in Cornwall. These included Richard Bennet, vicar of St Veep, under the direct orders of Anthony Kingston, Provost Marshal serving under King Edward VI.

Rare and valuable church silverware, which had been deposited with a branch of Lloyds Bank in St Austell and subsequently lost, was rediscovered in 2015 at an aircraft hangar used as a storage facility near Glasgow after numerous attempts to recover the treasures. Unbeknownst to the church, Lloyds had sub-contracted the handling of the antiques to the security company G4S. The returned items included an "extremely rare" chalice communion cup, dated 1579, with an estimated worth of £4000. Also a silver flagon tankard (1737) and a silver communion paten (1738).

=== St Cadix's Priory ===
A small cell or priory was built by the side of Penpol Creek, today the site is referred to as "St Cadix's Priory" but it has also appeared as St Ciric, St Carroc, St Cadokys, St Carrett and St Karroc. There is some uncertainty as to which saint the priory was dedicated to; either 6th-century Celtic Saint Cadoc or Cyricus son of Saint Julietta, who the parish church is dedicated to. Little remains of the priory today and a farmhouse was built on the site in 1710, but there are some remains of a crucifix and ecclesiastical stones dated at 1150 onwards.

In 1100 the priory was granted to the Benedictine Cluniac Montacute Priory in Somerset by William, Count of Mortain. Before that a small cell or holy well had existed. It remained the priory's until the dissolution of the monasteries in 1536. For most of its time just one monk and prior lived there. Three priors are known: Robertus (1339), Wilhelmus Smythe (1385) and Laurence Castleton (1536). The cells' residents included Walter de Exeter who supposedly wrote a biography of Guy of Warwick in 1301.

After dissolution the freehold of the site was granted to Laurence and Dorothy Courtenay on 3 September 1545. They leased it to the Cavells who leased it to Burchard Kranich a German silver smelter and adventurer. Kranich borrowed £500 from Mary Tudor, £150 from William Godolphin and more from several others to build a "melting house" in Lerryn which cost about £300 to build. Later he was lent £300 by Queen Elizabeth I, who ordered the repair of the bridge in Lerryn. Between 1556 and 1583 at least 2,000 ounces of silver were smelted with ore coming from mines in Tregardoke, Padstow, St Delion, Portysyke, Peran and St Columb. Kranich was arrested for his debts and held in the Marshalsea in London. He is credited with curing Queen Elizabeth I of smallpox.

=== Penpol ===
There are three hamlets named Penpol or Penpoll in the parish: Higher, Middle and Lower Penpol. The first known references to a Lord of Penpol are in 1224 and 1249. Higher and Lower Penpol are mentioned in a deed of 1375. In the 1839 Tithe map Higher and Middle Penpoll are sizable hamlets, but Lower Penpoll consists of just a cottage, the mill and a forge, today the hamlet has expanded with houses all the way up to Middle Penpol. Penpol Mill is mentioned in 1591 and it was rebuilt in 1794, today it is abandoned. The bridge across Penpol Creek was built in 1867, replacing a tidal ford.

In the run-up to the Battle of Lostwithiel, the ford at Penpol was seized by the Royalists on 14 August 1644.

== Famous people ==
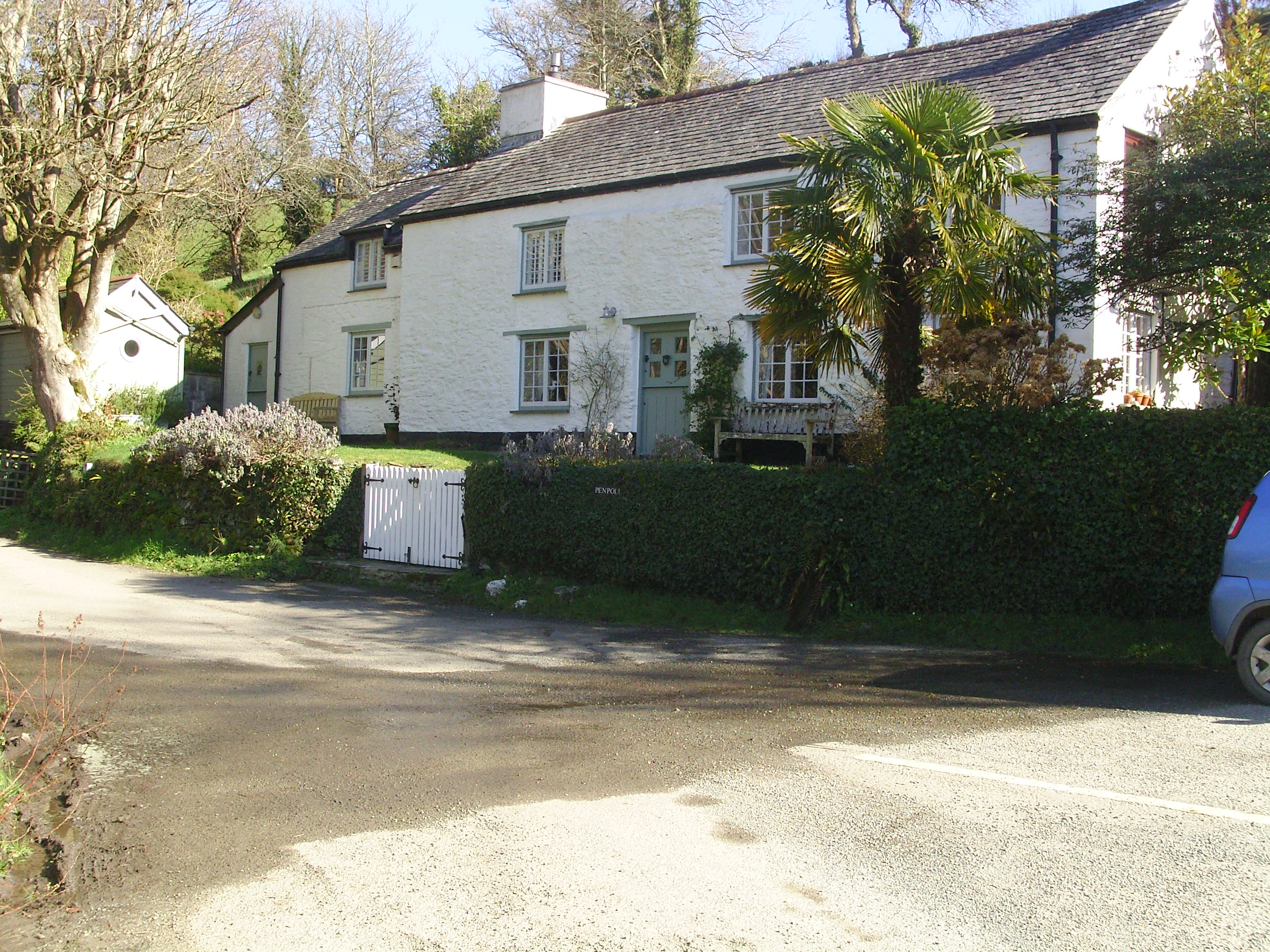
Penpol Cottage

Buried within the churchyard is the British stage and film actor Eric Portman (1901 – 1969) who lived in Penpoll Cottage, St Veep. Also Captain Robert Edwin Phillips VC (11 April 1895 – 23 September 1968) of the 13th Battalion, The Warwickshire Regiment who was awarded the Victoria Cross for an action at the River Hai, Kut-el-Amara, Mesopotamia on 25 January 1917.
