= Saint Veep =

Cornish saint

Veep (also known as Veepe, among other spellings; died 6th century) is the Cornish saint for whom the village and parish of St Veep were named.

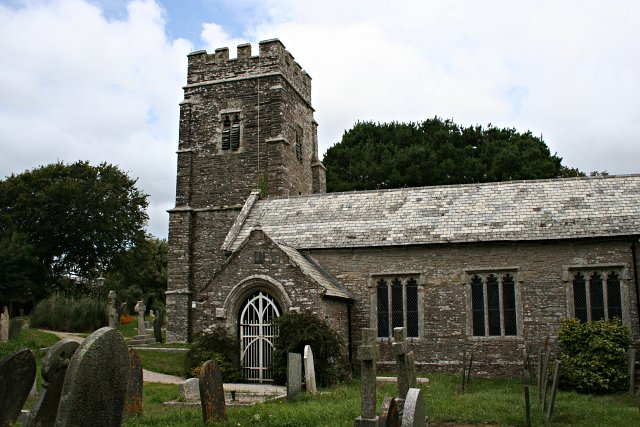
St Veep Parish Church, originally dedicated to Saint Veep

In records Veep appears inconsistently as male or female; the "unusual degree of confusion about the saint's gender suggests that, by the later middle ages, the name was largely that of a place-name rather than a saint with an active cult." as may be the reason for the change in dedication to the parish church of St Veep.

Veep may have been a daughter of King Brychan of Brycheiniog who is called Wennap (also Wennapa, Gwennap) or Weneu in Welsh records. Veep's feast day is 1 July.
