= St Mary the Virgin's Church, Braddock =

St Mary the Virgin’s Church, Braddock
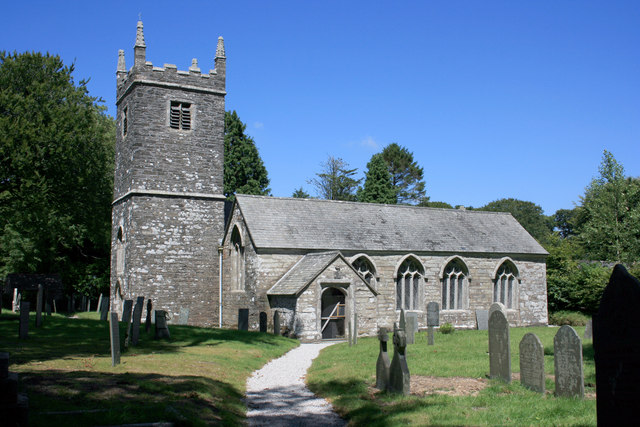
- St Mary the Virgin’s Church, Braddock

- Location within Cornwall
- 50°25′48.16″N 04°35′19.7″W
- Location: Braddock, Cornwall
- Country: England
- Denomination: Church of England

History
- Dedication: Saint Mary the Virgin

Administration
- Province: Canterbury
- Diocese: Truro
- Archdeaconry: Bodmin
- Deanery: Trigg Minor and Bodmin
- Parish: Lanlivery

Listed Building – Grade I
- Official name: Church of St Mary the Virgin
- Designated: 21 August 1964
- Reference no.: 1140324

St Mary the Virgin’s Church, Braddock or Bradoc is a Grade I listed parish church in the Church of England in Braddock, Cornwall.

== History ==
The current church dates from the 13th to 15th centuries. The font is Norman and there are many good examples of woodcarving in the church: these include the bench ends, part of the rood screen, wagon roofs, an Elizabethan pulpit and two carved panels perhaps of the 18th century.

== Parish status ==
The church is in a joint benefice with:

- Boconnoc Church
- St Winnow’s Church, St Winnow
- St Cyricius and St Julietta's Church, St Veep
- St Brevita’s Church, Lanlivery
- St Nectan’s Chapel, St Winnow
- St Bartholomew's Church, Lostwithiel

== Organ ==
The organ dates from 1885 and was built by Henry Jones of London. A specification of the organ can be found in the National Pipe Organ Register.

== Bells ==
The tower contains a peal of 5 bells all dating from 1845 by Charles and George Mears.
