= Breney Common =

Nature reserve in mid Cornwall, England

Coordinates: 50.4199°N 4.7363°W

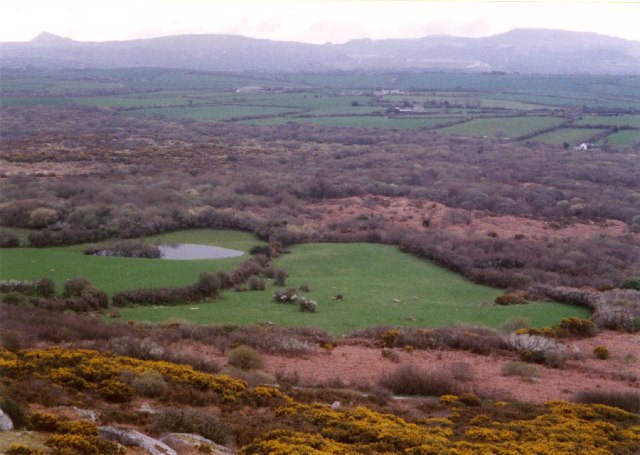
Breney Common from Helman Tor

Breney Common is a nature reserve and Site of Special Scientific Interest, noted for its biological characteristics, in mid Cornwall, England, UK. It is located mainly in Lanlivery civil parish, with the Saints' Way footpath running through it.

The common forms part of Breney Common and Goss and Tregoss Moors Special Area of Conservation. The nature reserve is owned by the Cornwall Wildlife Trust/Cornwall Trust for Nature.

== History ==
This SSSI used to belong to the Red Moor–Breney Common SSSI, the two sites having split in the 1986 revision where both sites were expanded. In 2017 these two SSSI were joined to Belowda Beacon SSSI and to Helman Tor (a non-statutory County Geology Site, not a SSSI) to form the Mid Cornwall Moors SSSI. There are now three adjacent nature reserves Breney Common, Red Moor and Helman Tor which have been renamed as Helman Tor Nature Reserve.
