= Fowey River Academy =

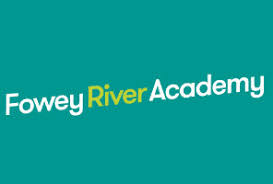
- Logo Of Fowey River Academy

Location
- Windmill; Fowey, Cornwall, PL23 1HE; England
- Coordinates: 50.33464°N 4.6436°W

Information
- Type: Academy
- Religious affiliation: Mixed
- Established: 1692; 334 years ago
- Local authority: Cornwall
- Department for Education URN: 140836 Tables
- Ofsted: Reports
- Chair: Jennifer Hick
- Principal: Ben Eddy
- Gender: Co-educational
- Age: 11 to 16
- Houses: Pencarrow, Trenarren, Gribben, Cannis, and Lantic
- Colours: Red, Pink, Green, Blue, and Yellow
- Website: www.fracademy.org

Fowey River Academy is a co-educational secondary school with academy status (Learning Edge Academies Partnership), serving a large and diverse catchment area including Fowey, the nearby towns of St Blazey and Lostwithiel and surrounding villages.

== History ==
The school dates back to the Fowey Free School which was founded in 1692 by John Rashleigh and Shadrack Vincent. The land was provided by John Treffry and Vincent gave £500 to purchase land to provide income for the school. Originally the school was for "educating 30 poor children of Fowey and adjacent places." numbers increased by 25 in 1773 when a further bequest was given John Johns.

In 1880, the school was converted to a Board School under the Elementary Education Act 1870 and a new building added in 1876. A new Grammar School, designed by Silvanus Trevail was built in 1879-80 on Daglands Road.

In 1922, both school were taken over by the County Council and two charities set up the Fowey Grammar School Site Foundation, which held the land and buildings, and the Fowey Grammar School Exhibition Foundation which provided assistance above that of the local authority.

In 1957, a new Secondary Modern School was opened, and the board school became a primary school. In 1970 the Secondary Modern become Fowey Comprehensive School. The original building ceased being used 1989 and were eventually sold in 1997.

The school was awarded full community school status in 1990, and in 1992 received the Schools’ Curriculum Award for enriching the curriculum through links with the community.

Previous Logo of Fowey River Academy

The school was designated Fowey Community College in 1997 following its successful application to become Cornwall’s first Technology College in September 1996. It gained second phase funding in 1999 and entered its third phase in 2002. In 1996 it was awarded Investor in People status and was re-designated for a third time in 2002.

In 2001 it received the Eco Schools and Schools Achievement Awards, in 2002 it received the Sportsmark and Investor in People awards and in 2003 it was awarded membership of the Specialist Schools Trust Value Added Club.

It became a Beacon School in September 2000 and a Leading Edge School in 2004.

In 2004 it was identified by OFSTED as a school “extremely effective in providing high quality education and ensuring that their pupils achieve very well.”

In 2013 it was rated by Ofsted as inadequate. Following this rating it began the process of converting to an academy. and was given approval by the Education Secretary Michael Gove in February 2014. In the same week Ofsted inspectors said the school had improved significantly.

The school formally converted to academy status on 1 June 2014 and was renamed Fowey River Academy. The school is part of the Adventure Learning Academy Trust.

In August 2015 the head teacher John Perry stepped down and handed his role over to Executive Principal: Sara Davey and Principal Martin Dale. In July 2017 Principal Martin Dale took full control of the school, with Executive Principal Sara Davey going back to her post at Mounts Bay Academy.

The academy in July 2017 received an Ofsted inspection that spanned over two days, the overall effectiveness rating was released by Ofsted on Monday 11 September 2017, the school received a 'Requires Improvement' rating, Ofsted had the following to say on the report:

Improve the quality of teaching and raise achievement for all pupils, including those who are disadvantaged, by ensuring that

- staff consistently use assessment data effectively to monitor and improve pupils’ progress
- teachers plan activities that routinely challenge pupils to think more deeply
- advice and guidance provided by teachers consistently helps pupils to improve their work

The full report is published here.

== Financial management ==
The school was featured in a ‘damning’ BBC Panorama documentary, that looked into the way two academy trusts (ALAT & Bright Tribe) had spent millions of pounds. Serious questions were raised about how money was spent on improvements, as well as claims that school governors were denied financial reports and that there was a lack of local scrutiny over the way the school was run. Fowey River Academy was reportedly charged at least £300,000 for LED lighting that its chairman of governors said was not installed.
