= Penpol Creek (River Fowey) =

Tidal creek in Cornwall, England

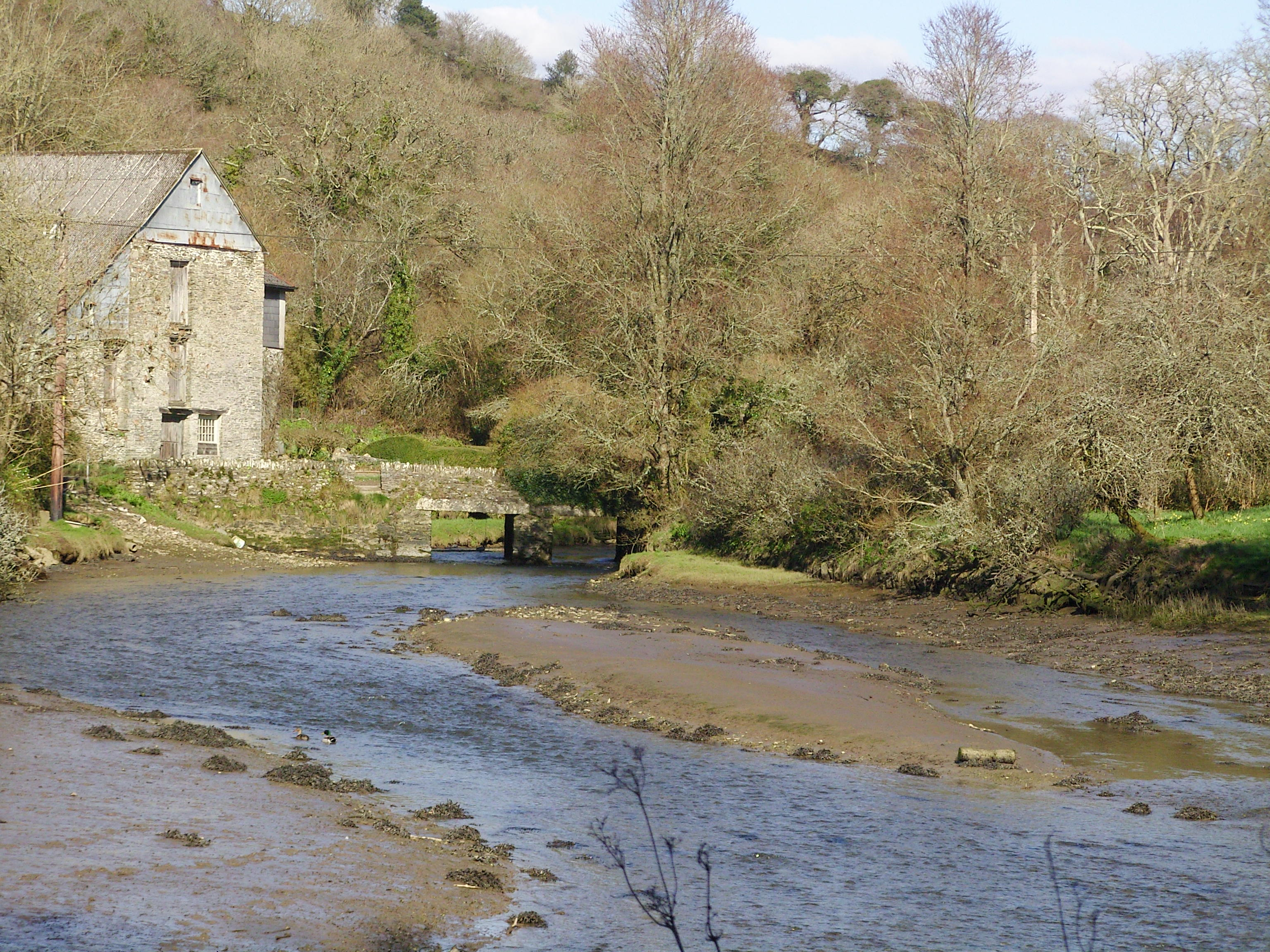

Location
- Country: England
- Location: Cornwall

Basin features
- Progression: River Fowey; 50.3590°N 4.6238°W

Penpol Creek is a tidal creek which is a tributary of the River Fowey in Cornwall, England, UK. It lies between the parishes of St Veep and Lanteglos-by-Fowey. The tidal limit is at the bridge at lower Penpol. Penpol Mill is mentioned in 1591 and it was rebuilt in 1794, today it is abandoned. The bridge was built in 1867, replacing a tidal ford. Above the bridge the river becomes Trebant Water.
