= Helman Tor =

Hill in Cornwall, England

- Torr Helman
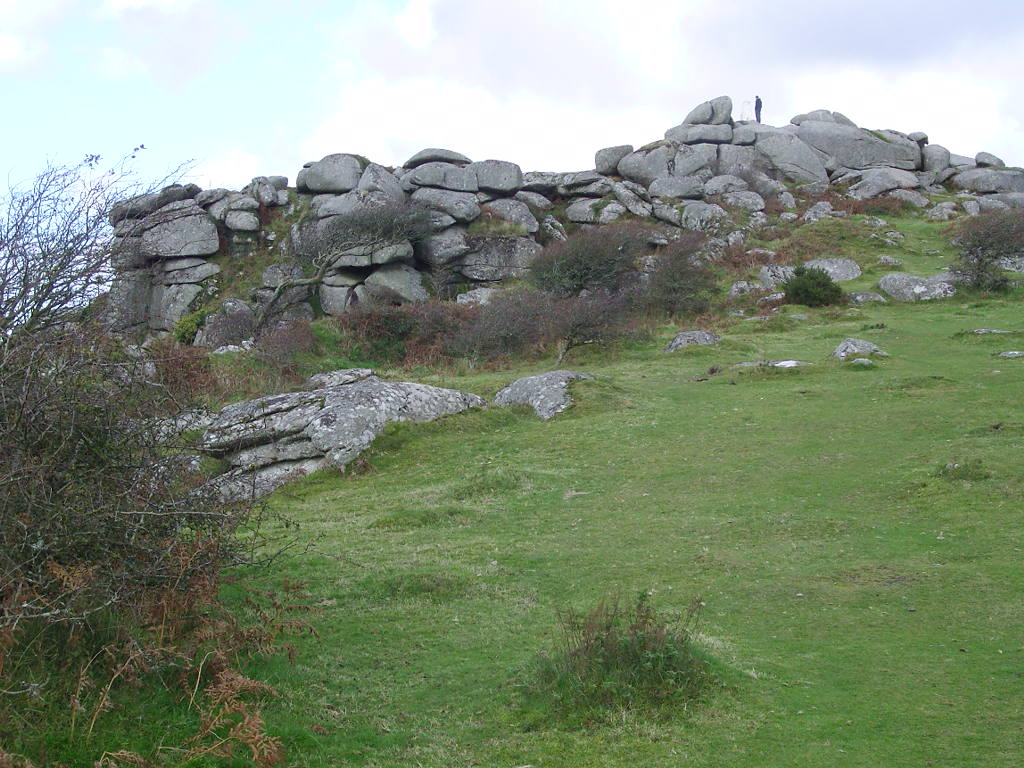

Highest point
- Elevation: 209 m (686 ft)
- Coordinates: 50°25′19″N 4°43′46″W

Geography
- Location within Cornwall
- Location: Lanlivery, Cornwall, UK
- OS grid: SX 062 615

Helman Tor (Cornish: Torr Helman) is a granite hill in mid Cornwall, UK with several separated tors, and is designated as a (non-statutory) County Geology Site (with similar criteria to a County Wildlife Site). The hill also has a Scheduled Ancient Monument. Helman Tor is also the name of the largest nature reserve managed by the Cornwall Wildlife Trust which includes Breney Common (a Special Area of Conservation) and Red Moor. The Wildlife Trust aims to rewild the reserve, including potentially releasing beavers, as well as long-horn cattle and Cornish black pigs. Helman Tor, along with Breney Common, Red Moor and Belowda Beacon, is part of the Mid Cornwall Moors Site of Special Scientific Interest designated both for biological and geological interest. It is also within the Mid Cornwall Moors National Nature Reserve, designated by Natural England in May 2026. It lies on the Saints' Way, a long-distance footpath completed in 1986.

It is the northern end of a granite ridge. There are at least three rocking stones (logan stone) on the ridge.

There is a prehistoric hill fort and a stone hut circle settlement on the site. There is evidence of walls constructed in Neolithic period, around 6,000 years ago, as well as some level platforms, thought to be house sites, one platform has a network of postholes. There is also remains of a field system. These are similar to those at Carn Brea and limited excavation was carried out by Roger Mercer.

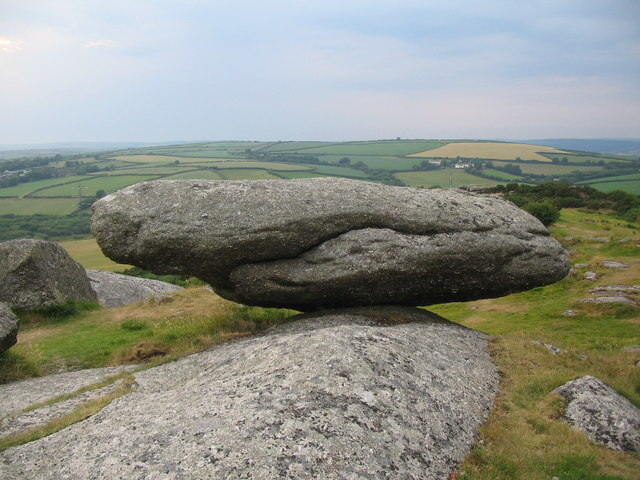
One of the logan stones

There is a second Logan stone in the highest pile beside the trig point (triangulation point). A third logan stone is further down the ridge to the south, outside the reserve.
