= Molinnis =

Coordinates: 50.400°N 4.789°W

- Location within Cornwall
- OS grid reference: SX019593
- Civil parish: Treverbyn
- Unitary authority: Cornwall
- Ceremonial county: Cornwall
- Region: South West
- Country: England
- Sovereign state: United Kingdom

Molinnis is a hamlet in Cornwall, England. It is half a mile north of Bugle.
