= Lostwithiel Stannary Palace =

Public building in Lostwithiel, Cornwall, England

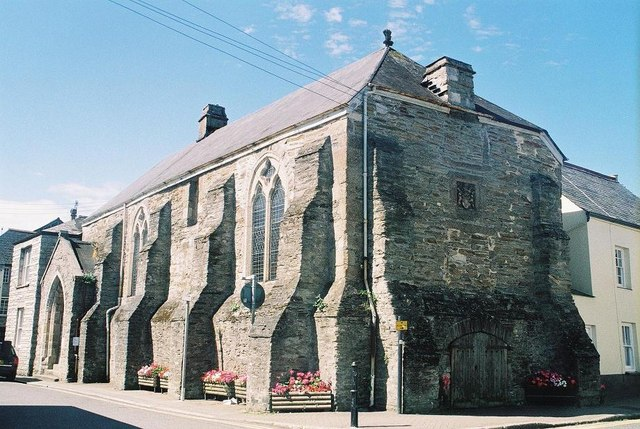
- Lostwithiel Stannary Palace

- Shown in Cornwall
- 50.4067°N 4.6685°W
- Location: Hightown, Sandbach

History
- Built: c.1280

Listed Building – Grade I
- Official name: Freemasons' Hall
- Designated: 18 October 1949
- Reference no.: 1327326

The Stannary Palace, also known as the Duchy Palace, was a complex of buildings operated by the Dukes of Cornwall as the centre of their administration. The surviving exchequer hall is a Grade I listed building.

== History ==
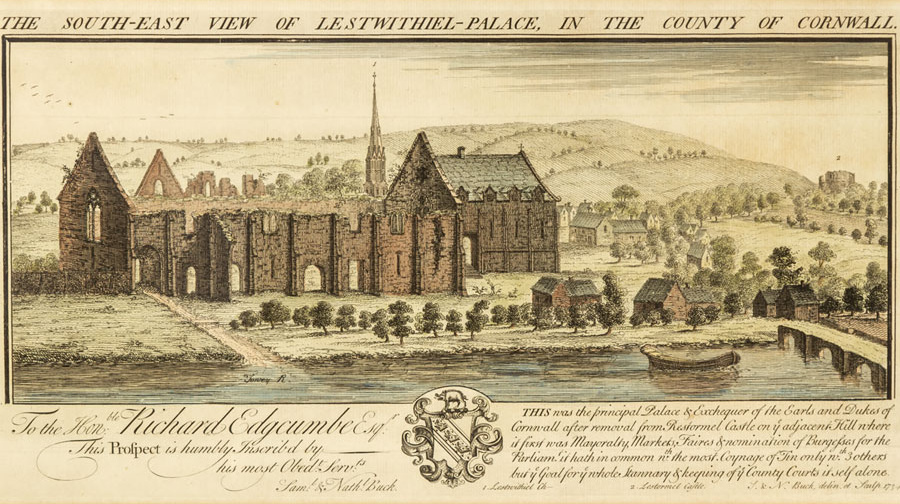
An 18th-century engraving of the palace

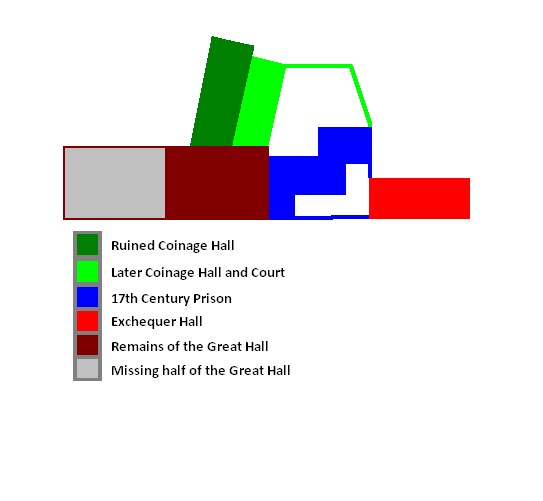
Plan of the surviving complex

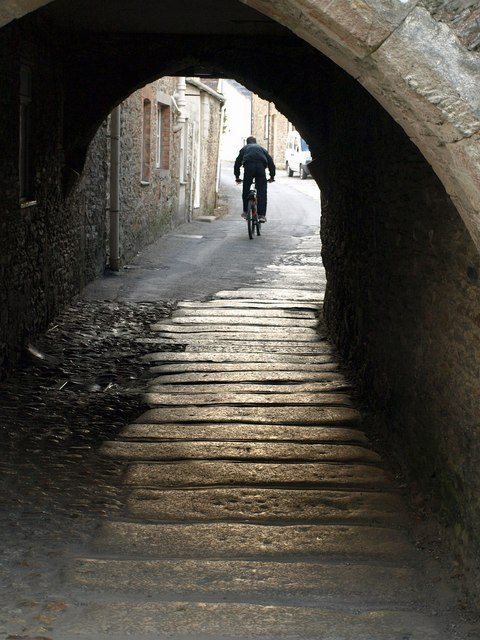
A tunnel under the remaining part of the Great Hall

This building was part of a very large complex, covering more than 2 acres (8,100 m^{2}), built by Edmund, 2nd Earl of Cornwall in around 1280 during the reign of King Edward I. In the 14th century, the complex, which included a great hall, an exchequer hall, a coinage hall and a smelting house, was used by the Edward the Black Prince, then the Duke of Cornwall, as his exchequer headquarters. When the Black Prince paid his first visit to Lostwithiel and Restormel Castle in 1353, he installed the Prince of Wales' plume of feathers on the apex of the exchequer hall roof where they remain.

In 1495, King Henry VII directed that "the standard weights for Cornwall to be kept at Lostwithiel".

The Cornish stannaries were suspended as a consequence of the Cornish rebellion of 1497. Henry VII restored the stannaries in return for a payment from the tin miners of the, at the time, enormous sum of £1,000, to support his war on Scotland. In addition to restoring the stannaries and pardoning the people who participated in the rebellion, Henry's Charter of Pardon of 1508 provided that no new laws affecting miners should be enacted without the consent of twenty-four stannators, six being chosen from each of the four stannaries at Lostwithiel, Launceston, Truro and Helston.

In 1533, John Leland stated that "in Lostwithiel is the Shire Hall for Cornwall and it is the Shire town for Cornwall."

In August 1644, the English Civil War was at its height and the town of Lostwithiel was taken by Robert Devereux, 3rd Earl of Essex who made it his headquarters. During the battle of Lostwithiel the town, including the great hall, was badly damaged. After the great hall fell into a state of decay, the surviving exchequer hall became the main meeting place for the stannators i.e. leaders of the tin making industry.

After the last tinners' parliament was held in the town in 1751, the building slowly fell into decay and was sold to the local freemasons lodge in 1878. The complex was used as a masonic hall for 120 years until it was purchased by the Prince's Regeneration Trust in late 2008. The trust carried out extensive repairs, in partnership with the Cornwall Buildings Preservation Trust, which now manages the building. Following refurbishment by contractors Carrek, to a design by Purcell, Miller Tritton, the building was re-opened by the Duke and Duchess of Cornwall on 17 July 2013.

== See also ==
- Revived Cornish Stannary Parliament
- Cornwall (territorial duchy)
- Kingdom of Cornwall
- Stannary law
- Stannary
