= Boconnoc Church =

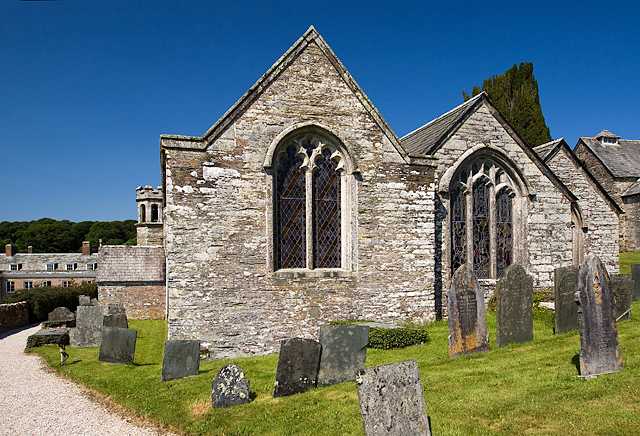
- Boconnoc Church
- 50°24′59.26″N 4°36′36.49″W
- Location: Boconnoc, Cornwall
- Country: England
- Denomination: Church of England
- Website: www.boconnoc.com

History
- Dedication: unknown

Administration
- Province: Canterbury
- Diocese: Truro
- Archdeaconry: Bodmin
- Deanery: Trigg Minor and Bodmin
- Parish: Boconnoc
- Location within Cornwall

Listed Building – Grade I
- Official name: Boconnoc Parish Church
- Designated: 21 August 1964
- Reference no.: 1140355

Boconnoc Church is a Grade I listed Church of England parish church in Boconnoc, Cornwall.

== History and description ==
The church dates from the 13th to 15th century, but was the subject of a substantial restoration in 1873. It consists of a nave, a south aisle and porch, a north chapel and, in the south west of the church, "a turret instead of a true tower".

It contains a 15th-century font. The tower of 1877 has five sides in the lower part and eight in the upper. Features of interest include a musicians' gallery, the altar table made by Sir Reginald Mohun (1621), the Jacobean pulpit, and a monument to the wife of Will Drew.

The church was placed onto the National Heritage List for England in August 1964.

== Parish status ==
The church is in a joint benefice with:

- St Brevita’s Church, Lanlivery
- St Winnow’s Church, St Winnow
- St Cyricius and St Julietta’s Church, St Veep
- St Mary the Virgin's Church, Braddock
- St Nectan’s Chapel, St Winnow
- St Bartholomew's Church, Lostwithiel

== Monuments ==
- Penelope Mohun (d. 1637)
