= Sweetshouse =

Hamlet in Cornwall, England

Coordinates: 50.424°N 4.695°W

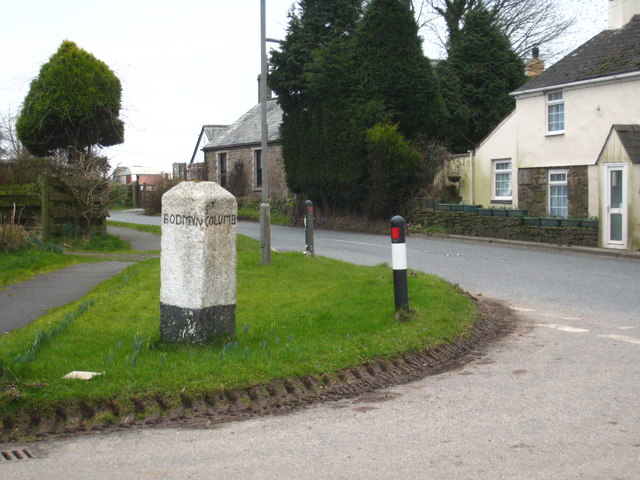
Old milestone at Sweetshouse

Sweetshouse is a hamlet in Cornwall, England, United Kingdom. It is about one mile south of Lanhydrock.
