= Lanlivery =

Village in Cornwall, England

Coordinates: 50.400°N 4.704°W

Lanlivery: Cornish: Lannlyvri
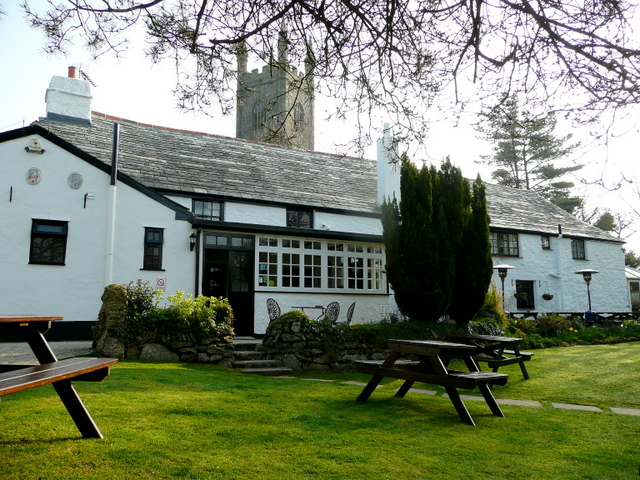
- The Crown Inn, Lanlivery

- Location within Cornwall
- Population: 519 (United Kingdom Census 2011 including Boslymon)
- OS grid reference: SX079591
- Civil parish: Lanlivery
- Unitary authority: Cornwall
- Ceremonial county: Cornwall
- Region: South West
- Country: England
- Sovereign state: United Kingdom
- Post town: LOSTWITHIEL
- Postcode district: PL22
- Post town: BODMIN
- Postcode district: PL30
- Dialling code: 01208
- Police: Devon and Cornwall
- Fire: Cornwall
- Ambulance: South Western
- UK Parliament: South East Cornwall

Lanlivery (Cornish: Lannlyvri) is a village and civil parish in Cornwall, England, United Kingdom. The village is about 1 1/2 miles (2.4 km) west of Lostwithiel and five miles (8 km) south of Bodmin. The Saints' Way runs past Lanlivery. Helman Tor, Red Moor and Breney Common nature reserves lie within the parish.

== Other settlements ==
Other settlements in the parish of Lanlivery include Redmoor, Sweetshouse, Milltown and Tangier (now a suburb of Lostwithiel). The manor of Penkneth or Penknight was one of the original 17 Antiqua maneria of the Duchy of Cornwall. (The seal of the borough of Lostwithiel was a shield charged with a castle rising from water between two thistles, in the water two fish, with the legend "Sigillum burgi de Lostwithyel et Penknight in Cornubia".) At Pelyn is a 17th-century house which was formerly the seat of the family of Kendall. It was originally E-shaped but only one side survives and the centre was completely redone in the early Victorian period.

== Parish church ==
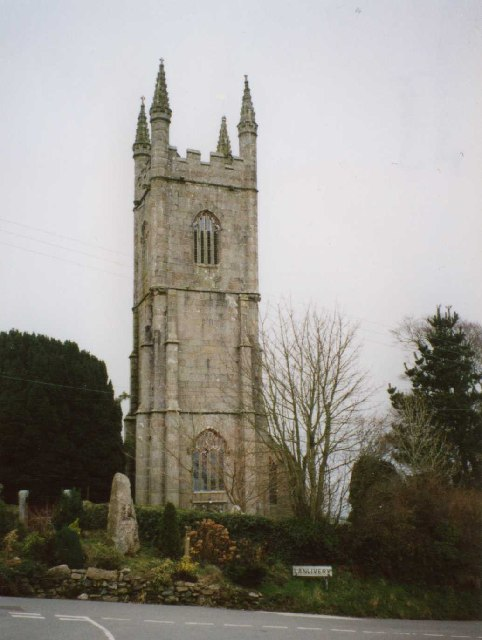
Lanlivery parish church

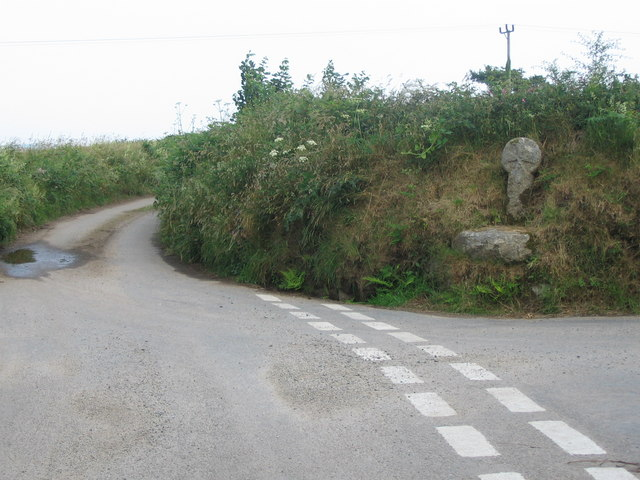
Sandyway Cross

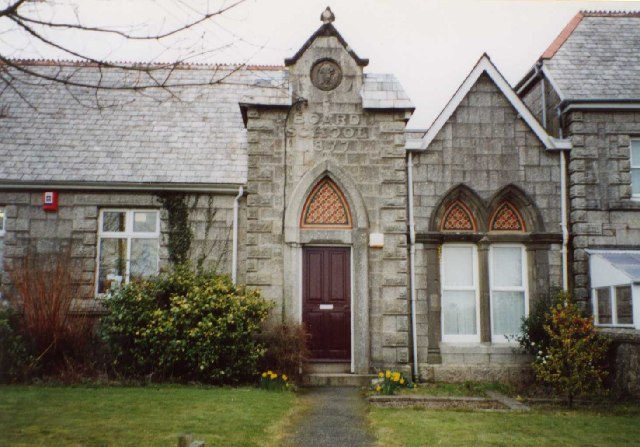
Lanlivery Board School

The parish church is dedicated to St Brevita or Bryvyth, a saint of whom nothing is known. Evidence for this dedication is found in the will of a vicar of Lanlivery dated 1539. The building was originally cruciform but was enlarged in the 15th century by the addition of a magnificent tower and the south aisle. The churches of Lostwithiel and Luxulyan were originally chapelries dependent on Lanlivery. "One of the great churches of Cornwall" according to John Betjeman.

There is a holy well dedicated to St Bryvyth in woodland just outside the village.

There are four stone crosses in the parish: Trethew Cross consists of a crosshead which was found in 1900 and a separate base; Trevorry or Sandyway Cross was found in 1936; Menawink Cross is a cross with a mutilated head which was found c. 1990 and erected shortly thereafter on the opposite side of the road; Crewel Cross was first reported in 1870 built into a stile (in 1900 the two separate parts were joined together and erected on a base). Two stone crosses from Lanlivery were removed in the 1840s and turned into monuments: one was taken to Boconnoc and one to St Winnow.
