= Saints' Way =

29-mile footpaths in Cornwall, England

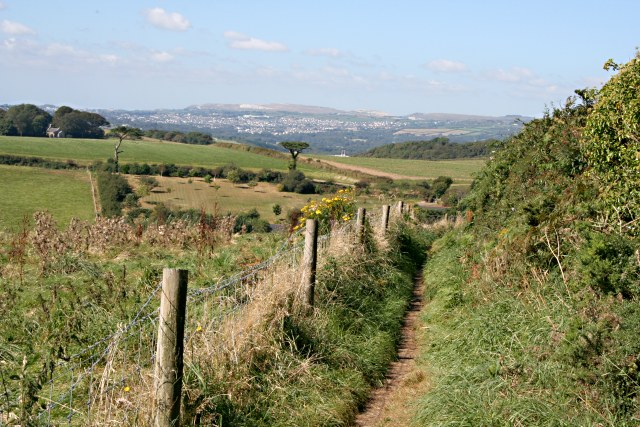
The Saints' Way looking north west towards St Austell

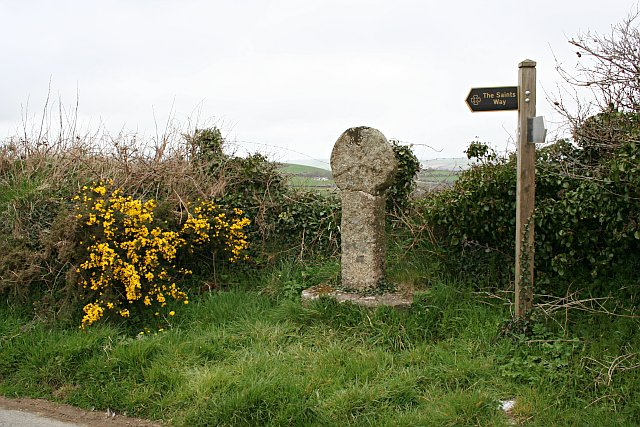
Signpost and Celtic cross along the Saints' Way near Lanivet

The Saints' Way (Cornish: Forth an Syns) is a long-distance footpath in mid Cornwall that connects the coastal towns of Padstow and Fowey.

The Saints' Way follows a possible reconstructed route taken by early traders and Christian travellers making their way between Ireland, Wales, and Mainland Europe. Rather than risk the difficult passage around Land's End, they could disembark from ships on the coast of Cornwall and progress over land to other coast ports such as Fowey on foot.

== Description ==
The footpath runs North-West to South-East, from North Padstow—on the North coast of Cornwall—to Fowey—on South coast of Cornwall. The Saints' Way's symbolic trailheads are St Petroc's Church in Padstow (50.541°N 4.943°W), and St Finbar's church in Fowey (50.336°N 4.636°W).

As the Way approaches Helman Tor from Lanivet, the Way diverges into two routes, both leading to Fowey. The eastern route passes Helman Tor, through Lanlivery, to Golant, and to Fowey. The western route passes through Luxulyan, to St Blazey, to Tywardreath, to Fowey. The Saints' Way via the Luxulyan route is a total distance of 28.5 miles (45.6 km), and via the route Lanlivery totals 29 miles (46.6 km).

Part of the route is a bridleway so can be used by horse-riders.

The route passes many Celtic crosses and holy wells

== History ==
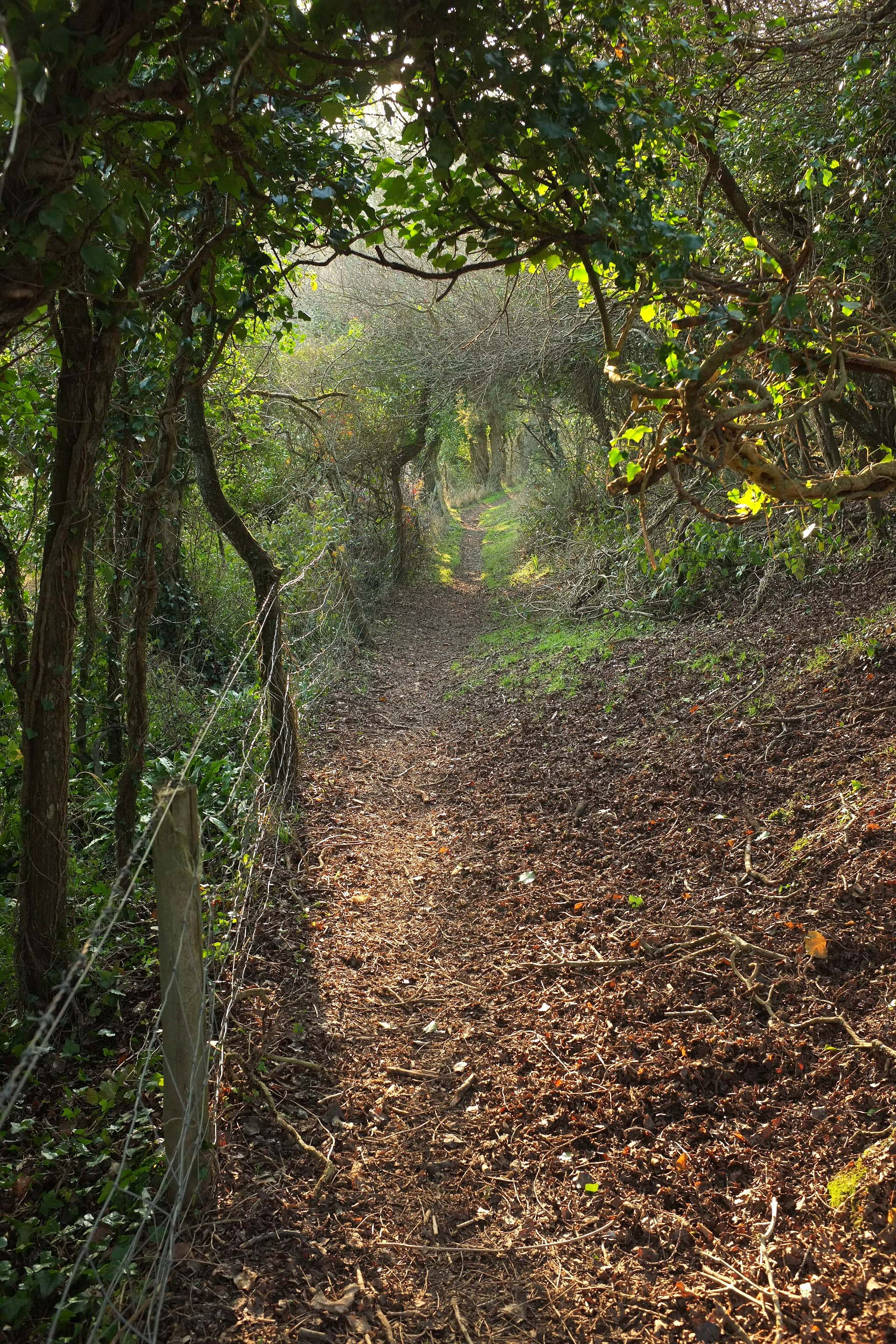
The Saints' Way by Petherick Creek

Early seafarers travelling between Ireland or Wales, and Brittany were often reluctant to travel around Land's End and The Lizard peninsulas due difficult sailing conditions due to frequent storms. Instead, travellers disembarked along one of Cornwall's coasts, and travelled over the Cornish peninsula toward the opposite coast where they would then reëmbark. Such travellers included traders and religious figures took various transpeninsular routes across Cornwall.

One such transpaninuslar journey was from Padstow and Harlyn Bay by the Camel Estuary, then heading to Fowey and St Austell Bay along the south.

Between 50 and 55 AD, a Roman trading centre was constructed at Tregear near Nanstallon and it is thought its purpose was to serve the main communication and trade route linking the north Cornish coast at the River Camel and the southern coast at the River Fowey, the 'transpeninsular route'. However the centre was abandoned after only 20–25 years and it was not used again. It is thought that the trading route served the Celtic peoples of Ireland, Wales, Cornwall and Brittany as Nanstallon was built close to major mineral bearing areas.

The routes between Padstow and Fowey largely declined in use during the Roman period in Cornwall. In the post-roman perioid in Cornwall, cultural and religious exchange between Ireland, Wales, Brittany and Cornwall, as a part of the Age of the Saints in Celtic Christianity.

=== Modern reconstruction ===
In 1984, two villagers from Luxulyan—Cliff Townes and Alf Fookes—discovered of a section of abandoned pathway surfaced with cobbles and a series of granite stiles that had been covered by overgrown vegetation.

The Saints' Way was created as part of the Cooperative Retail Services Community Programme and opened in 1986.

== See also ==
- Camel Trail
- Cornish Coast Path
- List of long-distance footpaths in the United Kingdom
- Doom Bar
