= Lostwithiel =

Town in Cornwall, England

Coordinates: 50.40741°N 4.66964°W

Lostwithiel: Cornish: Lostwydhyel
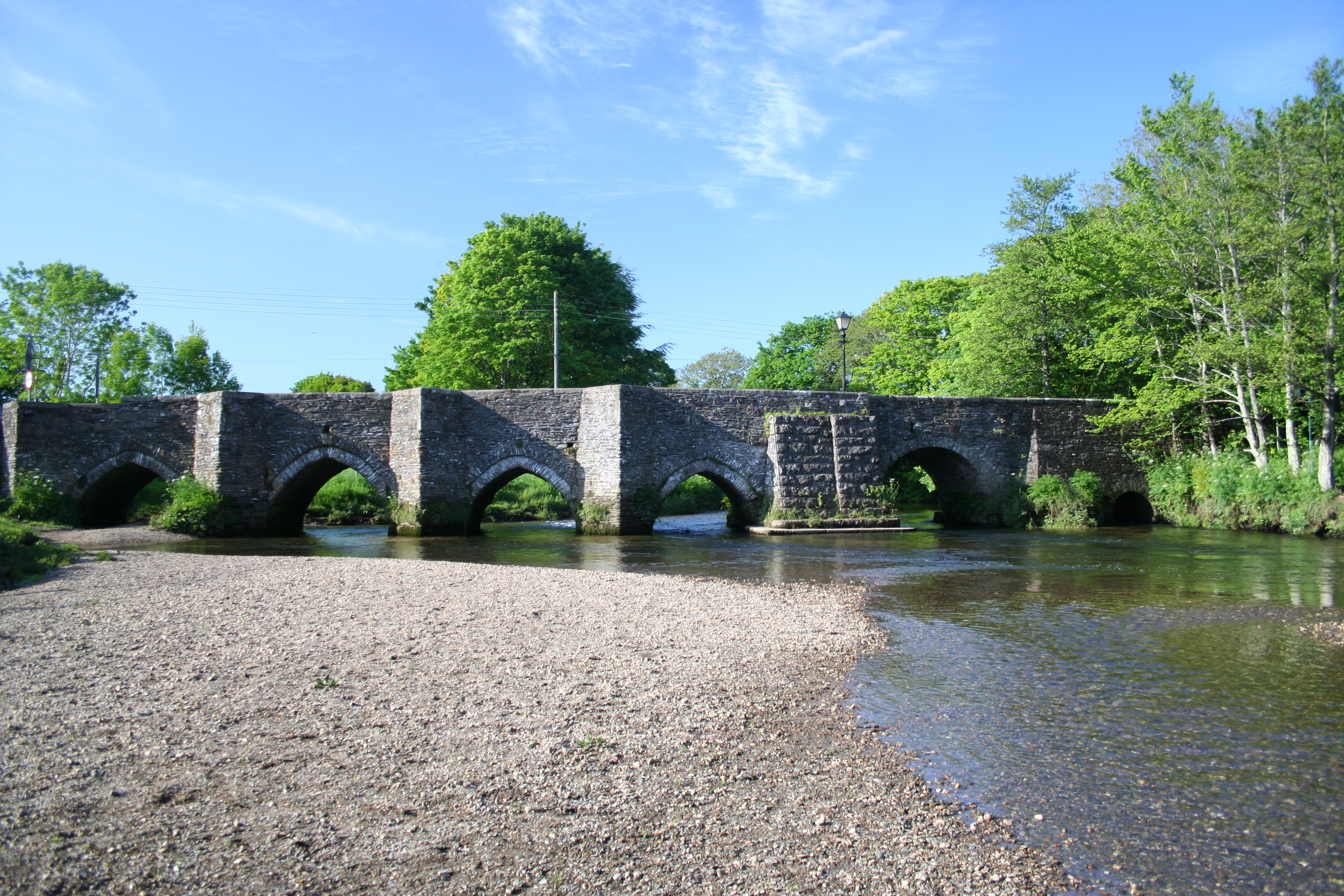
- The 12th-century bridge across the River Fowey

- Location within Cornwall
- Population: 3,070 (Parish, 2021)
- OS grid reference: SX104598
- Civil parish: Lostwithiel
- Unitary authority: Cornwall Council
- Ceremonial county: Cornwall
- Region: South West
- Country: England
- Sovereign state: United Kingdom
- Post town: LOSTWITHIEL
- Postcode district: PL22
- Dialling code: 01208
- Police: Devon and Cornwall
- Fire: Cornwall
- Ambulance: South Western
- UK Parliament: South East Cornwall

Lostwithiel (/lɒsˈwɪðiəl/; Cornish: Lostwydhyel [lɔstˈwɪðjɛl], meaning wooded tail) is a town and civil parish in Cornwall, England, United Kingdom. It stands at the head of the estuary of the River Fowey. At the 2021 census, the population of the parish was 3,070. The name Lostwithiel comes from the Cornish "lostwydhyel" which means "tail of a wooded area".

== Origin of the name ==
The origin of the name Lostwithiel is a subject much debated. In the 16th century it was thought that the name came from the Roman name Uzella, translated as Les Uchel in Cornish. In the 17th century popular opinion was that the name came from a translation of Lost (a tail) and Withiel (a lion), the lion in question being the lord who lived in the castle.

Current thinking is that the name comes from the Old Cornish Lost Gwydhyel meaning "tail-end of the woodland".

== History ==
Lostwithiel was founded in the 12th century by Norman lords who built the nearby Restormel Castle. Lostwithiel received its town charter in 1189. It was initially laid out as a pair of adjoining boroughs: Penknight or Penkneth to the south of South Street, which was founded by Robert de Cardinham as lord of the manor, and Lostwithiel to the north of South Street, founded by the Earls of Cornwall. Lostwithiel formally absorbed Penkneth in 1268. In the late 13th century, Edmund, 2nd Earl of Cornwall oversaw the building of the Stannary Palace, the bridge and the square church tower.

The Battle of Lostwithiel, an important battle in the First English Civil War, took place near Lostwithiel in 1644. In it Parliamentarian forces were defeated by the Royalists. The Parliamentarians would go on to win the war but Cornwall remained under Royalist control until 1646.

Jaques Bagratuni, a prince and ambassador of Armenia to Britain, died in Lostwithiel on 23 December 1943 but was buried at Brompton Cemetery in London.

The Trinity Iron Mine was founded in the 1790s to mine haematite iron ore. In 1797 Philip Rashleigh found a sample of goethite here. Following a visit by Queen Victoria and Prince Albert it was renamed to the Royal Restormel Iron Mine in 1846. A horse-drawn tramway ran from the mine, to the old cattle market in the centre of town and on to the Town Quay on the River Fowey. Up to 120 people were employed in the mine and it produced 4,500 tons of ore annually. The mine closed in 1883.

== Geography ==
The town is situated in the Fowey river valley, positioned between the A390 road from Tavistock to Truro and the upper tidal reaches of the river.

Lostwithiel railway station is on the Cornish Main Line from Plymouth to Penzance. It is situated on the south side of the town, just across the medieval bridge. The line was originally built for the Cornwall Railway which built its main workshops here, but the surviving workshop buildings were transformed into apartments in 2004. A branch line takes china clay trains to Fowey.

The town contains the suburbs of Bridgend to the east and Rosehill and Victoria to the west of the River Fowey.

To the south of the town is the Shirehall Moor nature reserve which follows the course of the River Fowey and opens out to a wide salt marsh. The reserve is a haven for birdlife including swans, ducks, egrets, herons, kingfishers and Canada geese.

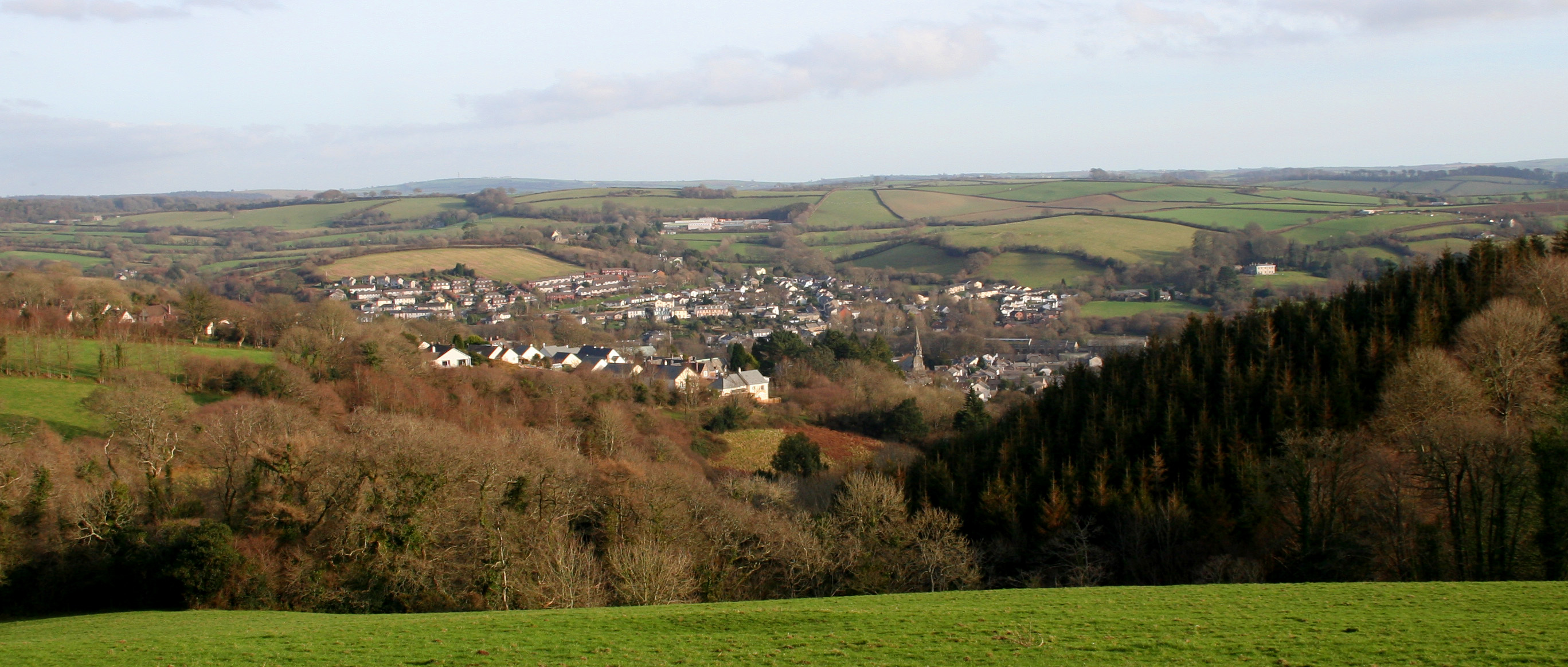
Lostwithiel looking from the west

== Buildings ==
Lostwithiel's most notable buildings are St Bartholomew's Church and Restormel Castle. Once a stannary town, and for a period the most important in Cornwall, it is now much reduced in importance. There is a fine early fourteenth-century bridge with six pointed arches, and nearby the remains of the Stannary Palace, with its exchequer hall. Lostwithiel Guildhall in Fore Street has an arcaded ground floor and contains the local museum.

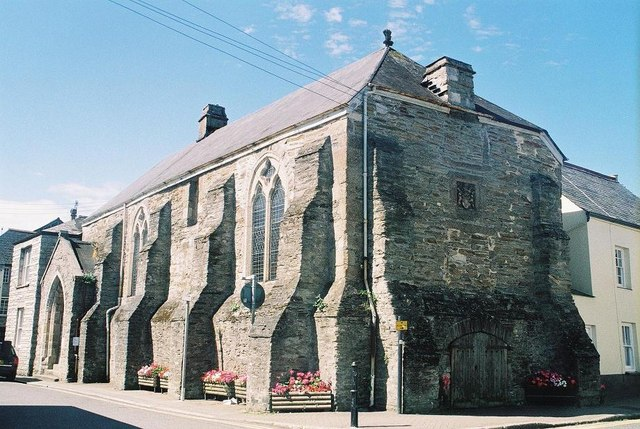
The old Stannary Palace

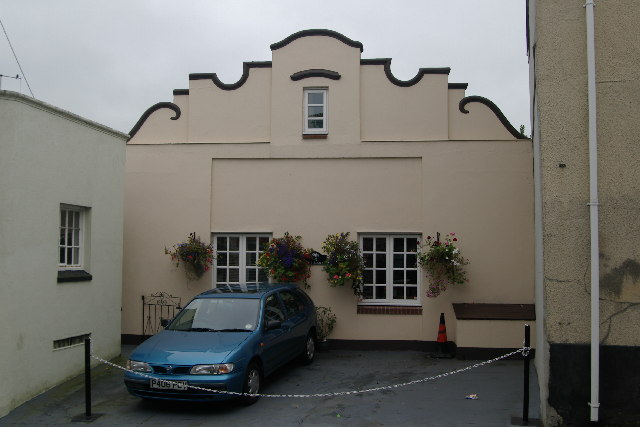
The old Fire Station

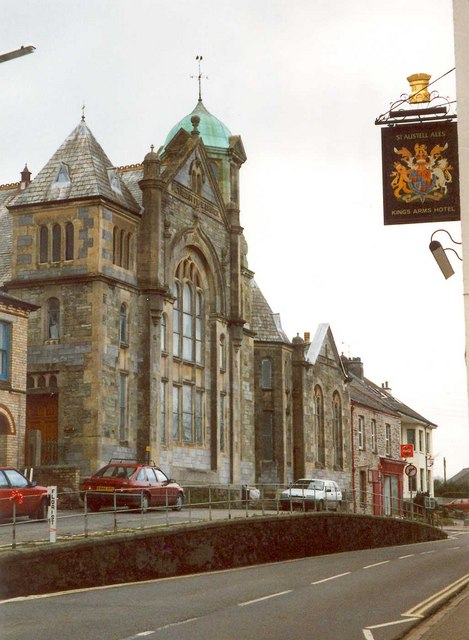
The Methodist Church in Queen Street

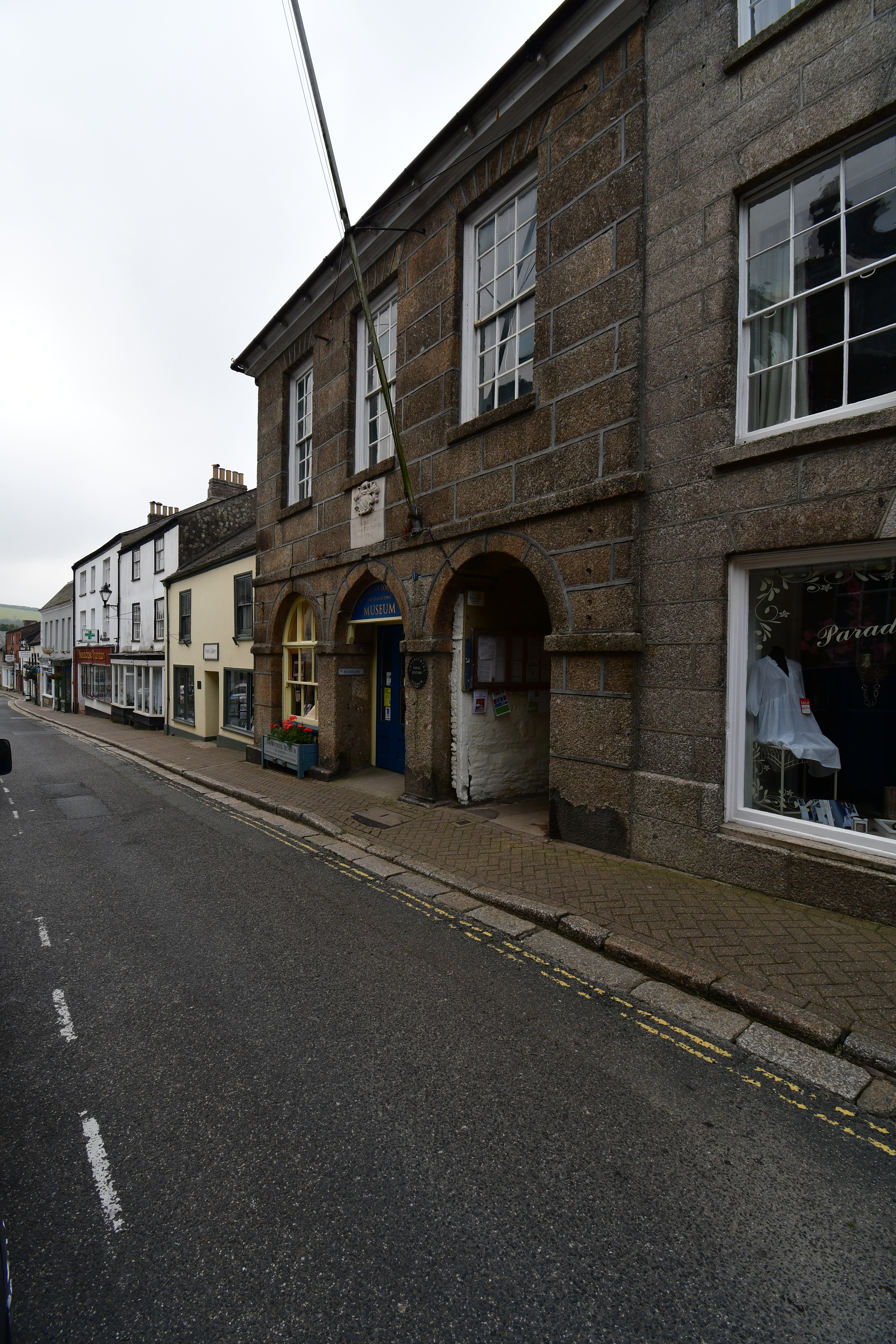
Lostwithiel Guildhall

== Governance ==
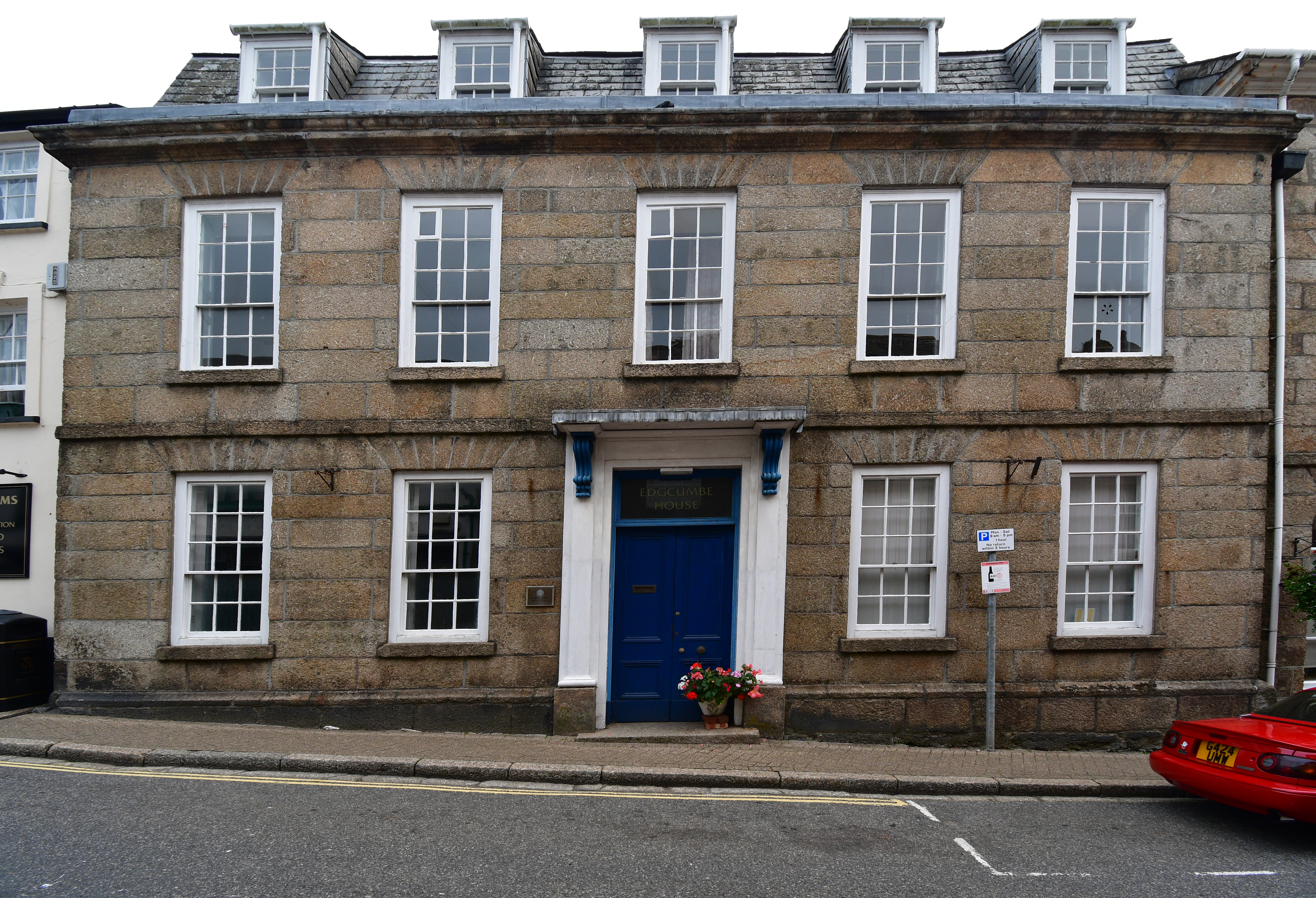
Edgcumbe House, Fore Street: Town Council's headquarters

There are two tiers of local government covering Lostwithiel, at parish (town) and unitary authority level: Lostwithiel Town Council and Cornwall Council. The town council is based at Edgcumbe House on Fore Street, and holds its meetings in the town's library. The library forms part of Taprell House, the older rear wing of Edgcumbe House, which dates back to the 16th century.

=== Administrative history ===
Lostwithiel historically formed part of the ancient parish of Lanlivery, in the Powder Hundred of Cornwall. The town was a borough from the 12th century, but remained part of the parish of Lanlivery until the 16th century. St Bartholomew's Church was built to serve the town, but was initially a chapel of ease to Lanlivery. When Lostwithiel was made a separate parish in the 16th century, the parish boundaries were drawn relatively tightly to just cover the area of the original planned settlement north of South Street, despite the borough boundaries by then covering a larger area.

The borough also served as a constituency for parliamentary elections from 1305, as the Lostwithiel parliamentary borough, returning two members of parliament. The constituency was abolished under the Reform Act 1832.

Lostwithiel was reformed to become a municipal borough in 1885, and the civil parish was enlarged to match the borough in 1896. The seal of the borough of Lostwithiel was a shield charged with a castle rising from water between two thistles, in the water two fish, with the legend "Sigillum burgi de Lostwithyel et Penknight in Cornubia". Its mayoral regalia includes a silver oar, signifying its former jurisdiction over the River Fowey. The borough council met at Lostwithiel Guildhall on Fore Street, built in 1740. In 1934 the council bought Edgcumbe House on the opposite side of Fore Street to serve as its offices, although meetings continued to be held at the Guildhall.

The borough was substantially enlarged in 1934, taking in surrounding areas west of the River Fowey from Lanlivery parish, including the area around Restormel Castle north of the town, and areas east of the Fowey from St Winnow parish, including the Bridgend area. Despite the 1934 expansion, Lostwithiel's population remained very low for a municipal borough. The difficulties of running the local government functions expected of boroughs at such a small scale led to the government introducing the concept of rural boroughs; places which were allowed to retain the honorific title of borough and continue to appoint a mayor, but which were absorbed into an adjoining rural district for the rural district council to take on local government functions. Lostwithiel was made such a rural borough in 1968, becoming part of the St Austell Rural District.

The rural borough of Lostwithiel and the St Austell Rural District were both abolished six years later in 1974 under the Local Government Act 1972, when the area became part of the new borough of Restormel. Instead of a rural borough council, Lostwithiel was given a parish council instead. As part of the 1974 reforms, parish councils were given the right to declare their parishes to be a town and take the title of town council, and give their chairperson the title of mayor. The new parish council for Lostwithiel exercised this right, becoming Lostwithiel Town Council.

Restormel was abolished in 2009. Cornwall County Council then took on district-level functions, making it a unitary authority, and was renamed Cornwall Council.

== Culture ==
The town has a playing field known as King George V Playing Field. Lostwithiel has several large parks including Coulson Park which was named after Nathaniel Coulson (the San Francisco property magnate) who was raised in Lostwithiel after being abandoned by his father.

The town is host to a number of annual cultural activities including an arts and crafts festival, a beer festival, a week-long carnival in the summer, food and cider festivals in October, and a Dickensian evening in December.

Trewithen Dairy, based at Greymere Farm near Lostwithiel, began bottling milk in 1994 on land farmed by the Clarke family since 1976. In June 2024 the business was acquired by the German dairy company Ehrmann. In 2026 the Trewithen Dairy brand was renamed Cornish Dairy Co. The company now employs 260 people in Lostwithiel.

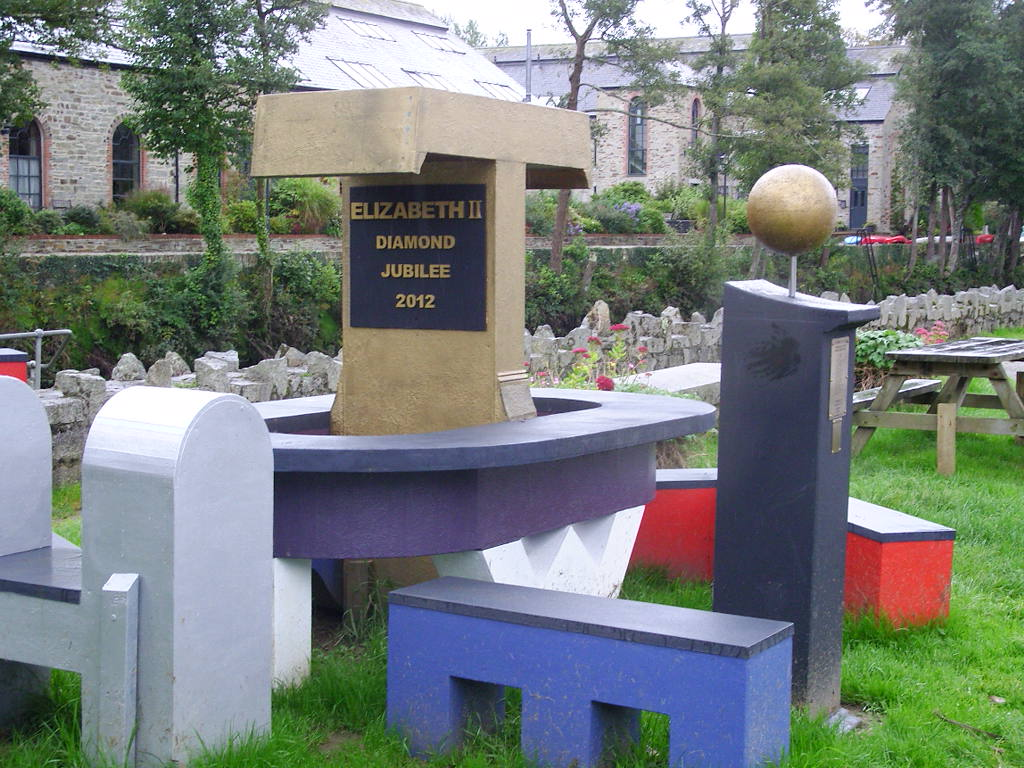
Lostwithiel Sculpture for the Queen's Diamond Jubilee

== Sport ==
Cornish wrestling tournaments, for prizes, have been held in Lostwithiel for centuries. Venues have included the grounds of Lanwithan, Coulson Park and the King George V Playing Field.

Lostwithiel hosted the Interceltic Games in 1982.

== Education ==
There are two primary schools in Lostwithiel: St Winnow C E School and Lostwithiel Primary School. Both schools are academies. Lostwithiel Primary School is part of the Peninsula Learning Trust Multi Academy Trust and St Winnow C E School is part of The Saints Way Multi Academy Trust. The majority of children aged between 11 and 16 attend Fowey River Academy or Bodmin College.

Lostwithiel Educational Trust is a local charity which makes "grants to local schools and churches, as well as to individuals, for educational purposes"

== Transport ==
One or two trains each hour stop at Lostwithiel railway station with services in each direction between Plymouth or Penzance, many continuing beyond Plymouth to Cardiff Central or London Paddington.

National Express provides a regular coach service to London which runs via Plymouth for connections to other destinations. The coach stop is located outside the Royal Talbot Hotel.

Bus stops in Lostwithiel are outside the Royal Talbot Hotel and Cott Road phone box.

== Twinning ==
Lostwithiel was twinned with Pleyber-Christ in Brittany, France in 1979. The people in the Twinning Associations of both towns usually meet up every year, alternating between Lostwithiel and Pleyber-Christ.

== Notable people ==
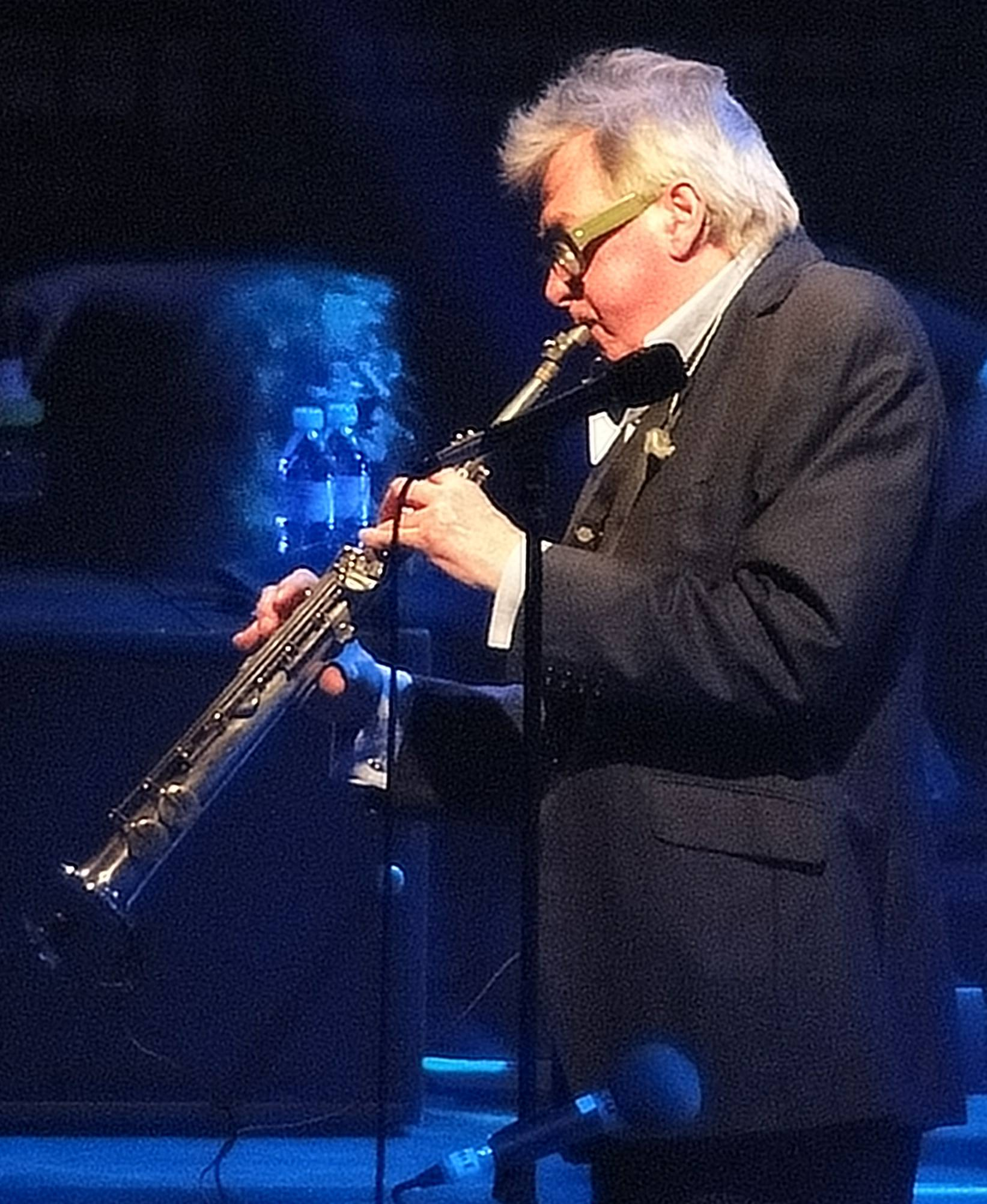
Andy Mackay, 2011

- Philip Melvill (1795–1882), a British Bengal Army officer who went on to be Military Secretary to the India Office, retired locally in 1857, died locally,
- Gertrude Parsons (1812–1891), novelist, a Roman Catholic convert who wrote numerous works.
- Frances Margery Hext (1819–1896), a local historian and author
- John Westlake (1828–1913), an English law scholar and social reformer.
- Andy Mackay (born 1946), musician. plays oboe and saxophone, founding member of the art rock group Roxy Music.
- Stephen Varcoe (born 1949), classical bass-baritone singer of Lieder.
- Noah Law (born 1994), politician and MP for St Austell and Newquay since 2024.

== See also ==
- Battle of Lostwithiel
- List of topics related to Cornwall
