= List of Sites of Special Scientific Interest in Cornwall =

Protected sites in the English county

Map of SSSIs in Cornwall within the UK

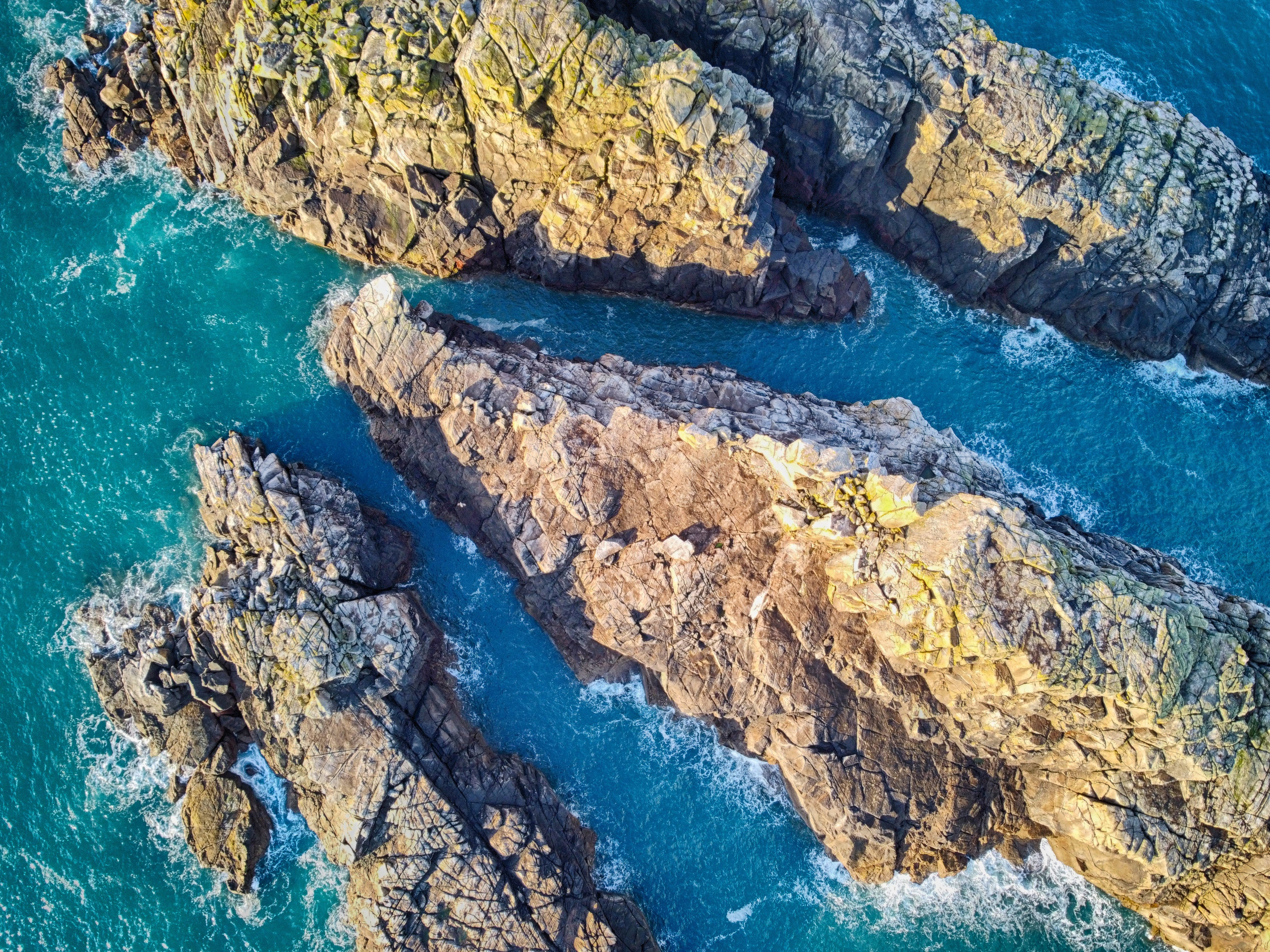
Men-a-Vaur overlooking Isles of Scilly

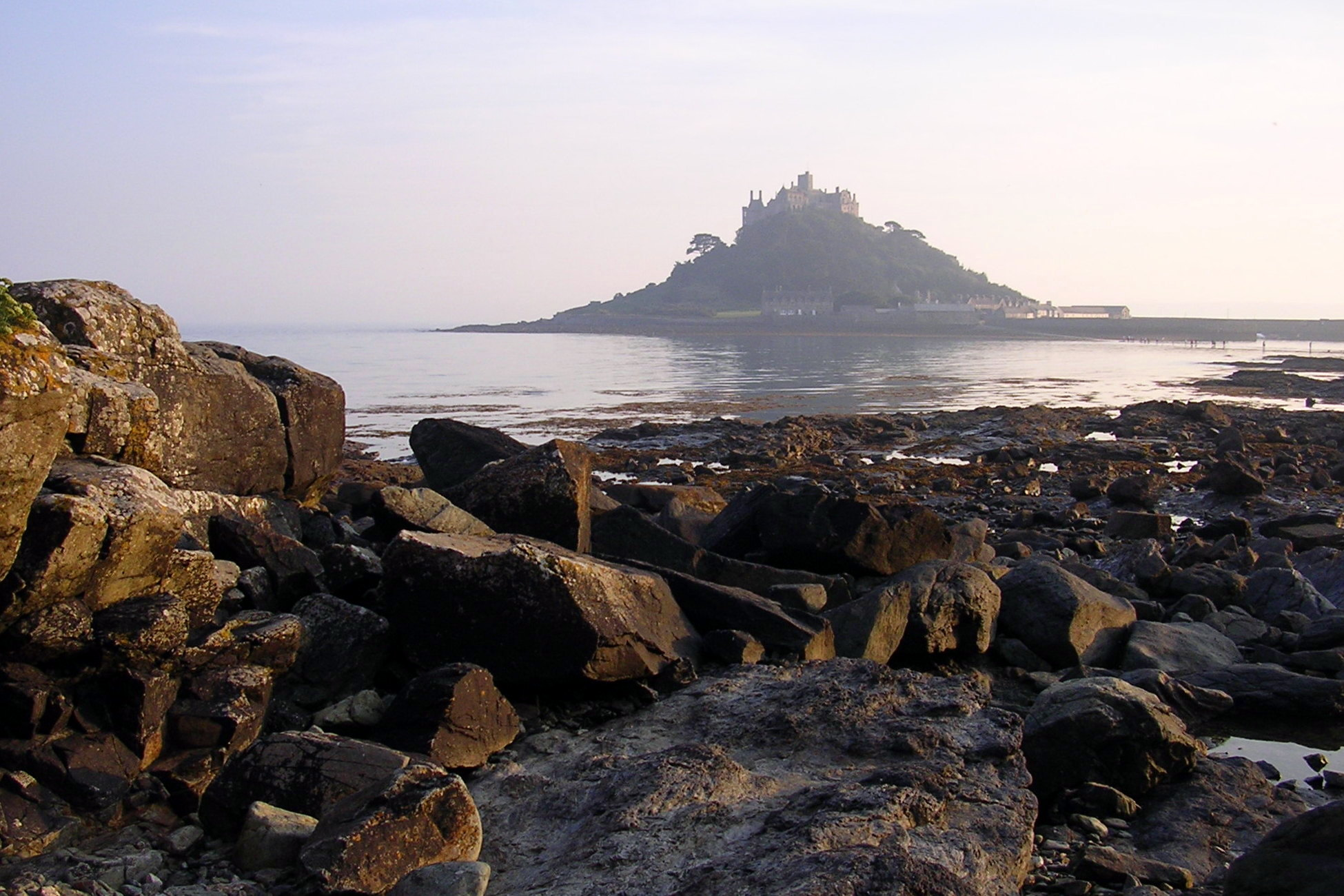
St Michael's Mount, a SSSI in west Cornwall

There are 167 Sites of Special Scientific Interest (SSSIs) in Cornwall (including the Isles of Scilly). Cornwall, in the south-west of England, UK, has a population of 583,289 (2024) across an area of 3,545 km^{2} (875,988.6 acres), making it one of the least densely populated counties within England. The north coast of Cornwall falls on the Celtic Sea in the Atlantic Ocean, which also surrounds the Isles of Scilly, the south coast falls on the English Channel and the county is bounded by the River Tamar, forming the border with Devon, to the east. Cornish geology consists mainly of rocks from the Devonian and Carboniferous geological periods. Granite forms a large part of these, with mineralisations of tin, copper, lead and arsenic having been mined in the area. This gives rise to many distinct habitats, with strong marine influences, including sand dunes, rocky reefs, stacks and headlands as well as heathland, moorland and unusual river profiles.

In England the body responsible for designating SSSIs is Natural England, which chooses a site "because of its flora, fauna, or geological or physiographical features". Natural England took over the role of designating and managing SSSIs from English Nature in October 2006 when it was formed from the amalgamation of English Nature, parts of the Countryside Agency and the Rural Development Service. Natural England, like its predecessor, uses the 1974–96 county system and as such the same approach is followed here, rather than adopting the current local government or ceremonial county boundaries.

Of the 167 sites designated in this Area of Search, the greatest number, 81, have been designated due to their biological interest, with 54 due to their geological interest and 32 for both. The data in the table is taken from English Nature in the form of citation sheets for each SSSI.

== Sites ==
Site name	Biological Interest^{[A]}	Geological Interest^{[A]}	Area (hectares)^{[B]}	Area (acres)^{[B]}	Grid reference^{[C]}	Year in which notified	Map^{[D]}
Aire Point to Carrick Du	✓	✓	704.8	1741.6	SW432385	1972	Map
Amble Marshes	✓		57.3	141.6	SW994746	1951	Map
Annet	✓		119.5	295.3	SV862088	1971	Map
Baulk Head to Mullion	✓	✓	152.3	376.3	SW663200	1995	Map
Bedruthan Steps and Park Head	✓	✓	80.8	200.0	SW850700	1951	Map
Belowda Beacon		✓	0.5	1.2	SW973627	1996	Map
Big Pool and Browarth Point	✓		10.0	25.0	SV879087	1971	Map
Boconnoc Park and Woods	✓		50.4	124.5	SX144603	1977	Map
Bodmin Moor, North	✓		4957.0	12248.0	SX160810	1951	Map
Borlasevath and Retallack Moor	✓		54.1	133.6	SW937667	1994	Map
Boscastle to Widemouth	✓	✓	639.0	1579.0	SX140970	1972	Map
Boscawen		✓	8.8	21.8	SW425231	1997	Map
Brendonmoor	✓		11.7	29.0	SX264955	1990	Map
Breney Common	✓		114.6	283.2	SX056614	1979	Map
Bude Coast	✓	✓	92.5	228.6	SS200069	1987	Map
Cabilla Manor Wood	✓		15.1	37.3	SX150697	1989	Map
Caerthillian to Kennack	✓	✓	141.1	349.6	SW720140	1951	Map
Cameron Quarry		✓	0.5	1.2	SW704507	1996	Map
Carn Grey Rock and Quarry		✓	1.9	4.8	SX034551	1991	Map
Carnkief Pond	✓		11.2	27.7	SW787520	1951	Map
Carrick Heaths	✓		42.7	105.5	SW800490	1973	Map
Carricknath Point to Porthbean Beach	✓		49.5	122.3	SW870330	2000	Map
Carrine Common & Penwethers	✓		45.8	113.3	SW797434	1973	Map
Castle Down	✓	✓	58.1	143.6	SV885160	1971	Map
Chapel Down (St. Martin's)	✓	✓	34.9	86.2	SV942159	1971	Map
Chyenhal Moor	✓		11.9	29.4	SW448279	1951	Map
Clicker Tor Quarry		✓	4.3	10.6	SX285614	1967	Map
Cligga Head	✓	✓	113.5	280.5	SW738537	1951	Map
Coombe Mill	✓		0.5	1.2	SS210117	2000	Map
Coverack Cove and Dolor Point		✓	5.6	13.9	SW785181	1951	Map
Coverack to Porthoustock	✓	✓	173.5	428.6	SW785189	1951	Map
Crocadon Quarry		✓	0.2	0.4	SX392658	1998	Map
Crow's Nest	✓	✓	18.9	46.8	SX265700	1999	Map
Crowhill Valley	✓		42.5	105.0	SW934513	1951	Map
Cuckoo Rock to Turbot Point		✓	102.5	253.4	SW990404	1998	Map
Cudden Point to Prussia Cove		✓	15.9	39.2	SW553278	1991	Map
De Lank Quarries		✓	21.9	54.1	SX101753	1994	Map
Dozmary Pool	✓		104.2	257.5	SX195745	1951	Map
Draynes Wood	✓		38.0	93.9	SX222685	1951	Map
Duckpool to Furzey Cove		✓	87.3	215.7	SS200090	1996	Map
East Lizard Heathlands	✓	✓	287.4	710.1	SW775192	1951	Map
Eastern Isles	✓		83.8	207.1	SV947144	1971	Map
Eglarooze Cliff	✓		30.8	76.1	SX349539	1951	Map
Folly Rocks		✓	2.4	6.0	SW573280	1990	Map
Gerrans Bay to Camels Cove	✓	✓	139.5	344.7	SW920371	1951	Map
Godrevy Head to St Agnes	✓	✓	627.4	1550.3	SW582423	1951	Map
Goonhilly Downs	✓		1271.0	3140.7	SW720200	1951	Map
Goss and Tregoss Moors	✓		701.9	1734.4	SW950600	1988	Map
Great Pool (Tresco)	✓		17.5	43.2	SV894146	1971	Map
Great Wheal Fortune		✓	0.6	1.4	SW627289	1991	Map
Greenamoor	✓		32.5	80.3	SX240955	1992	Map
Greenscoombe Wood, Luckett	✓		29.3	72.4	SX394725	1973	Map
Greystone Quarry		✓	4.4	10.9	SX366805	1994	Map
Grimscott	✓		11.0	27.1	SS279076	1992	Map
Gugh	✓		37.7	93.2	SV890083	1976	Map
Gwithian to Mexico Towans	✓	✓	371.1	917.2	SW570395	1953	Map
Harbour Cove		✓	29.1	71.9	SW915768	1990	Map
Hawks Tor Pit		✓	5.9	14.7	SX150749	1993	Map
Hayle Estuary & Carrack Gladden	✓		190.3	470.2	SW550379	1951	Map
Higher Moors and Porth Hellick Pool (St Mary's)	✓		16.2	40.0	SV924108	1971	Map
Hingston Down Quarry & Consols		✓	24.2	59.8	SX410718	1995	Map
Kelsey Head	✓		227.6	562.4	SW775600	1951	Map
Kennack to Coverack	✓	✓	265.7	656.5	SW733164	1951	Map
Kernick and Ottery Meadows	✓		29.8	71.6	SX185913	1992	Map
Kingsand to Sandway Point		✓	6.7	15.3	SX439508	1994	Map
Lidcott Mine		✓	0.1	0.3	SX241851	1987	Map
Loe Pool	✓	✓	128.7	318.0	SW647250	1951	Map
Loggans Moor	✓		10.7	26.4	SW577390	1986	Map
Lower Bostraze and Leswidden	✓		2.3	5.7	SW385315	1996	Map
Lower Fal & Helford Intertidal	✓	✓	277.7	686.2	SW860334	1997	Map
Lower Moors	✓		10.2	25.2	SV912106	1971	Map
Luxulyan Quarry		✓	49.9	123.5	SX055590	1993	Map
Lymsworthy Meadows	✓		7.7	19.0	SS272108	1992	Map
Lynher Estuary	✓		687.3	1698.3	SX375565	1951	Map
Malpas Estuary	✓		101.5	250.8	SW835430	1951	Map
Marazion Marsh	✓		59.9	148.0	SW515318	1951	Map
Meddon Moor	✓		32.0	79.0	SS272173	1992	Map
Meneage Coastal Section	✓	✓	79.7	197.0	SW777261	1994	Map
Merthen Wood	✓		72.2	178.4	SW730263	1972	Map
Minster Church	✓		0.7	1.7	SX111905	1998	Map
Mulberry Downs Quarry		✓	3.2	7.9	SX019658	1973	Map
Mullion Cliff to Predannack Cliff	✓	✓	108.5	268.1	SW670156	1951	Map
Nance Wood	✓		9.8	24.2	SW665450	1951	Map
Newlyn Downs	✓		115.7	285.9	SW834545	1997	Map
Norrard Rocks	✓		35.6	88.0	SV860135	1971	Map
Ottery Valley	✓		32.5	80.3	SX161895	1994	Map
Park Wood	✓		32.7	80.9	SX345667	1988	Map
Penberthy Croft Mine		✓	2.3	5.7	SW552324	1993	Map
Penhale Dunes	✓		1070.4	2645.0	SW771572	1953	Map
Peninnis Head (St. Mary's)	✓	✓	16.1	39.7	SV911094	1971	Map
Penlee Point		✓	1.8	4.4	SW473269	1990	Map
Penlee Quarry		✓	25.8	64.0	SW468278	1997	Map
Pentire Peninsula	✓	✓	113.7	281.0	SW934798	1951	Map
Pentle Bay, Merrick And Round Islands	✓		42.8	105.7	SV896139	1976	Map
Phoenix United Mine	✓		29.8	73.6	SX266724	1996	Map
Plains and Great Bay (St. Martin's)	✓		15.0	37.1	SV924163	1971	Map
Plymouth Sound Shores And Cliffs	✓		45.0	111.2	SX442488	1997	Map
Polruan to Polperro	✓		213.4	527.3	SX122508	1951	Map
Polyne Quarry		✓	0.1	0.2	SX225531	1988	Map
Polyphant		✓	3.4	8.4	SX260825	1994	Map
Pool of Bryher & Popplestone Bank (Bryher)	✓		5.9	14.6	SV875148	1971	Map
Porth Seal (St. Martin's)		✓	1.1	2.6	SV918166	1976	Map
Porthcew		✓	9.6	23.7	SW593270	1990	Map
Porthgwarra to Pordenack Point	✓		157.9	390.2	SW371217	1977	Map
Porthleven Cliffs		✓	8.8	21.7	SW623257	1973	Map
Porthleven Cliffs East		✓	13.1	32.4	SW634250	1990	Map
Porthloo		✓	0.7	1.7	SV907117	1996	Map
Rame Head & Whitsand Bay	✓	✓	160.1	395.6	SX367537	1996	Map
Red Moor	✓		89.1	220.2	SX072613	1979	Map
Redlake Meadows & Hoggs Moor	✓		30.5	75.4	SX128590	1995	Map
Retire Common	✓		61.8	152.7	SX005635	1951	Map
River Camel Valley and Tributaries	✓		621.2	1534.9	SX060707	1998	Map
Roche Rock		✓	2.2	5.4	SW991596	1991	Map
Rock Dunes	✓	✓	68.1	168.3	SW926765	1953	Map
Rosemullion	✓	✓	20.5	50.7	SW795281	1990	Map
Rosenannon Bog and Downs	✓		135.5	334.7	SW955675	1951	Map
Rosenun Lane		✓	0.4	0.9	SX249617	1988	Map
Rushy Bay and Heathy Hill	✓		12.2	30.1	SV874142	1971	Map
Samson (with Green, White, Puffin & Stony Islands)	✓		38.7	95.6	SV878125	1971	Map
Shipman Head & Shipman Down	✓	✓	40.7	100.6	SV877158	1971	Map
South Terras Mine		✓	0.6	1.5	SW933523	1996	Map
St Agnes Beacon Pits		✓	7.9	19.5	SW705510	1951	Map
St Austell Clay Pits	✓		0.6	1.5	SW996586	2000	Map
St Erth Sand Pits		✓	3.9	9.6	SW557351	1962	Map
St Helen's (With Northwethel & Men-a-vaur)	✓		26.6	65.7	SV900170	1971	Map
St John's Lake	✓		279.2	689.9	SX430540	1973	Map
St Martin's Sedimentary Shore	✓	✓	34.1	84.2	SV920160	1996	Map
St Mewan Beacon		✓	0.7	1.7	SW986534	1993	Map
St Michael's Mount		✓	2.6	6.3	SW515298	1995	Map
St Nectan's Glen	✓		3.4	8.4	SX080885	1985	Map
Steeple Point to Marsland Mouth	✓		342.8	847.1	SS212174	1973	Map
Stepper Point		✓	1.6	3.9	SW915783	1990	Map
Stourscombe Quarry		✓	0.5	1.2	SX344839	1953	Map
Swanpool	✓	✓	8.9	22.0	SW802315	1995	Map
Sylvia's Meadow	✓		4.5	11.4	SX412708	1992	Map
Talland Barton	✓		2.0	5.0	SX227515	2009	Map
Tamar–Tavy Estuary	✓		1422.3	3514.6	SX435591	1991	Map
Tater-du		✓	4.8	11.9	SW440231	1992	Map
Teän	✓	✓	18.8	46.4	SV909166	1971	Map
Tintagel Cliffs	✓	✓	221.8	548.1	SX042857	1951	Map
Trebetherick Point		✓	20.6	50.9	SW925780	1951	Map
Treen Cliff	✓		49.3	121.8	SW395224	1951	Map
Tregargus Quarries		✓	1.8	4.4	SW949541	1951	Map
Tregonetha & Belowda Downs	✓		105.1	259.8	SW960630	2000	Map
Tregonning Hill	✓		5.2	12.9	SW601299	1994	Map
Trehane Barton	✓		0.0	0.0	SW866482	1989	Map
Trelavour Downs		✓	0.3	0.7	SW960575	1990	Map
Trelow Downs	✓		149.8	370.2	SW925683	1999	Map
Tremearne Par		✓	14.5	35.9	SW610266	1992	Map
Trevaunance Cove		✓	6.8	16.9	SW723517	1993	Map
Trevone Bay		✓	9.4	23.2	SW889763	1990	Map
Trevose Head and Constantine Bay	✓	✓	158.5	391.7	SW858753	1951	Map
Upper Fal Estuary and Woods	✓		603.5	1490.6	SW850410	1968	Map
Upper Fowey Valley	✓		124.0	306.4	SX215730	1989	Map
Ventongimps Moor	✓		8.2	20.4	SW781510	1951	Map
Viverdon Quarry		✓	0.4	1.0	SX374675	1985	Map
Watermill Cove		✓	0.5	1.2	SV925122	1996	Map
West Cornwall Bryophytes	✓		53.9	133.3	SW661407	1999	Map
West Lizard	✓	✓	776.3	1917.4	SW671154	1968	Map
Western Rocks	✓		62.7	154.9	SV850070	1971	Map
Wheal Alfred		✓	1.1	2.8	SW580370	1990	Map
Wheal Gorland		✓	0.6	1.5	SW732429	1988	Map
Wheal Martyn		✓	0.1	0.3	SX002555	1990	Map
Wheal Penrose		✓	0.9	2.2	SW634252	1993	Map
White Island (off St. Martin's)	✓	✓	16.6	40.9	SV925176	1971	Map
Wingletang Down	✓		28.9	71.4	SV884075	1971	Map
Yeolmbridge Quarry		✓	0.7	1.7	SX322874	1990	Map

== See also ==
- List of Sites of Special Scientific Interest by Area of Search
- List of Special Areas of Conservation in Cornwall

== Notes ==
^{A} Reason for designation; either for the site's biological interest, or its geological interest.
^{B} Data rounded to one decimal place.
^{C} Grid reference is based on the British national grid reference system, also known as OSGB36, and is the system used by the Ordnance Survey.
^{D} Link to maps using the Nature on the Map service provided by Natural England.
