= Aire Point to Carrick Du SSSI =

Site of Special Scientific Interest in Cornwall, England

Aire Point to Carrick Du
- Site of Special Scientific Interest
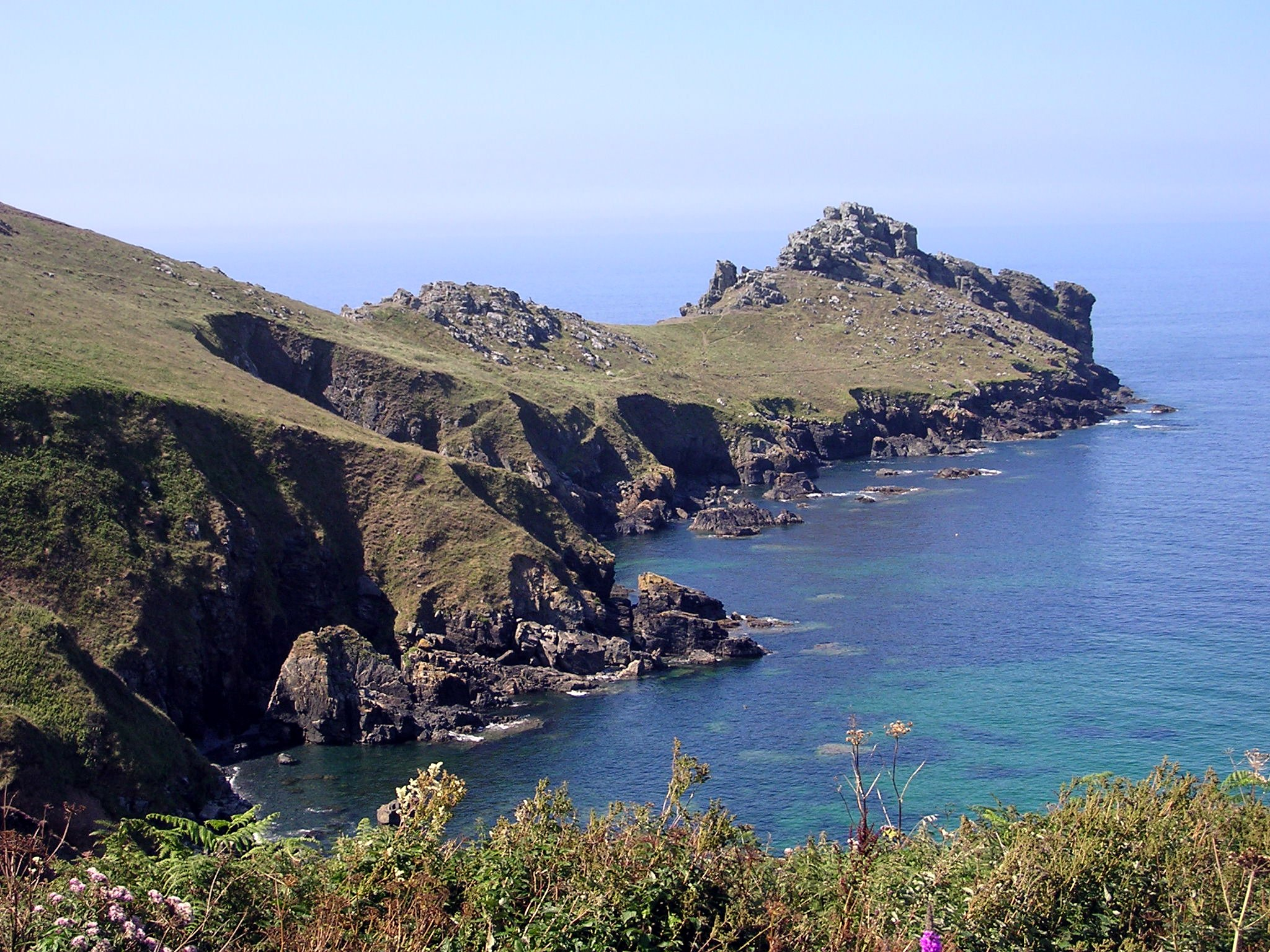
- Gurnard's Head, within the SSSI

- Location within Southwest Cornwall
- Location of Aire Point to Carrick Du.
- Area of search: Cornwall
- Grid reference: SW432385
- Coordinates: 50.1729°N 5.6228°W
- Interest: Biological/Geological
- Area: 704.81 hectares (7.048 km^{2}; 2.721 sq mi)
- Notification date: 1972

Aire Point to Carrick Du SSSI is a Site of Special Scientific Interest on the Penwith Peninsula, Cornwall, England. It is 5.98 square kilometres in extent, stretching from grid reference SW360279 to grid reference SW513410. The site is designated both for its biological and its geological interest.

The site includes a Nature Conservation Review site and eight Geological Conservation Review sites. The whole of the site is included in the Cornwall Area of Outstanding Natural Beauty and is within the Penwith Heritage Coast. Part of the site is within the West Penwith Environmentally Sensitive Area and some of the coast is owned and managed by the National Trust. The South West Coast Path, which follows the coast of south-west England from Somerset to Dorset passes through the SSSI.

== History ==
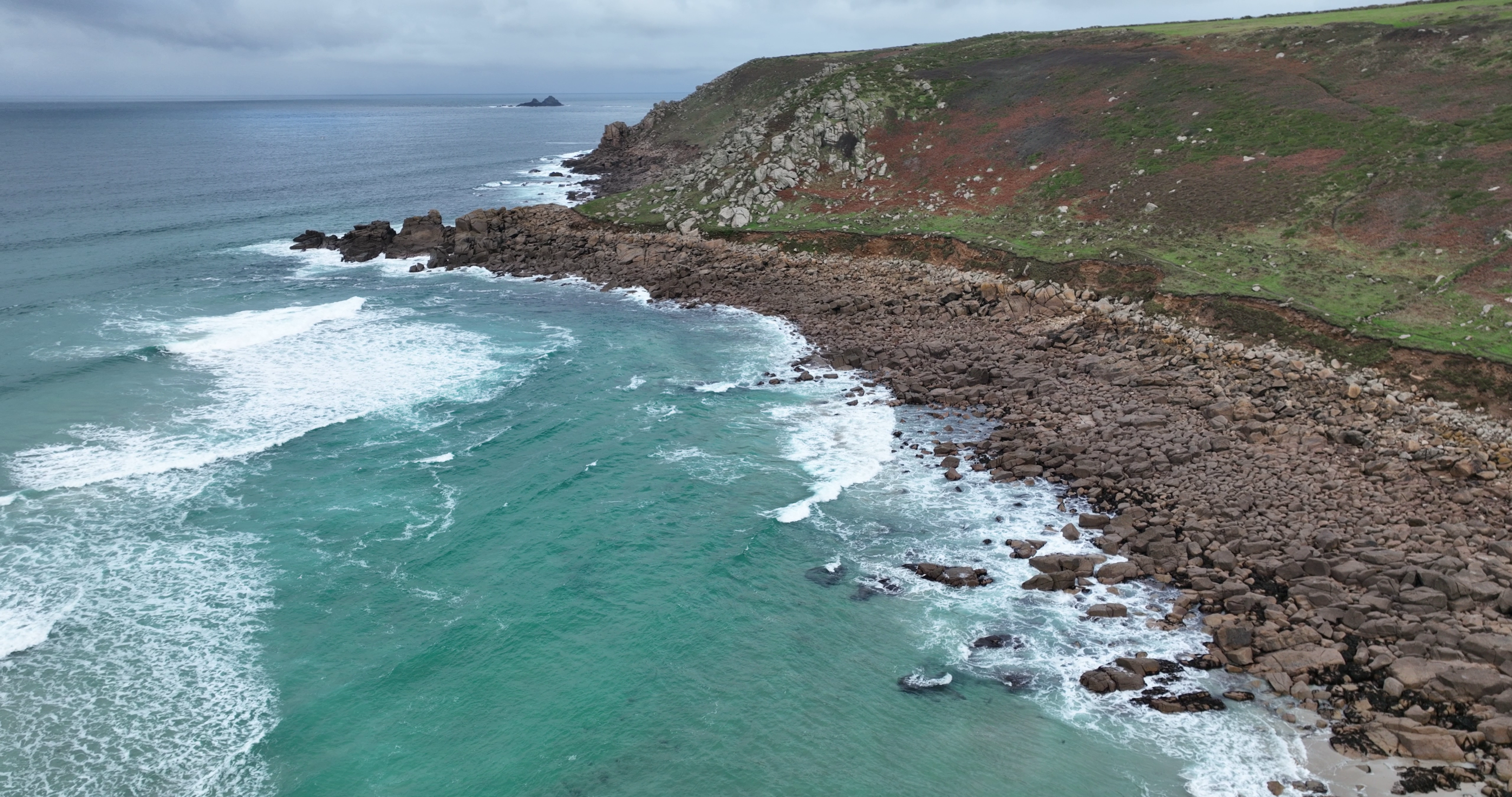
Aerial view of Aire Point headland, Cornwall/Devon, England.

The site or areas within it have previously been known by the following names:

- Botallack Head to Cape Cornwall SSSI
- Gurnard's Head and Porthmeor Cove, and Trevega and Trowan Cliffs SSSI
- Cape Cornwall to Clodgy Point SSSI

The site (under its current boundaries) was notified on 26 May 1995, having first been notified in 1972. However the Botallack Head to Cape Cornwall SSSI was first scheduled in 1967, and the Gurnard's Head and Porthmeor Cove, and Trevega and Trowan Cliffs SSSI was first scheduled in 1951.

== Description ==
Aire Point to Carrick Du is located on the west and north coast of the Penwith peninsula, extending from a point approximately 3 km north east of Land's End to St Ives. The site is dominated by vertical sea cliffs formed by the Land's End granite mass. The cliffs are topped by steep slopes punctuated by sheer castellated granite cams. Associated Devonian slates and basaltic rocks, altered by the intrusion of the granite, display fine examples of the effects of contact metamorphism. The soils, which are often thin, are generally acidic, well drained with a gritty, loamy texture and a humic surface horizon. Iron panning has impeded drainage locally and peaty soils have developed where wet flushes occur. Exposure to salt spray and the prevailing south westerly winds have resulted in a dwarfed vegetation.

== Biological interest ==
The site supports populations of Red Data Book and nationally scarce plants and animals.

=== Plant communities present on the site ===
The vegetation of the cliffs exhibits a complex of maritime and sub-maritime communities. The cliff slopes and tops are characterised by maritime grassland, heath and scrub communities with frequent species rich flushes, particularly on the north coast. The cliff faces support a maritime rock-crevice community with thrift Armeria maritima, rock samphire Crithmum maritimum, sea aster Aster tripolium and sea spleenwort Asplenium marinum as common components. On the shallow soils of rock ledges and outcrops, a maritime therophyte community occurs where typical species include: English stonecrop Sedum anglicum, thrift, buck's-horn plantain Plantago coronopus and kidney vetch Anthyllis vulneraria. The grassland communities of the cliff slopes are dominated by red fescue Festuca rubra which often forms a matressy sward, and Yorkshire-fog Holcus lanatus. Thrift, wild carrot Daucus carota, sea campion Silene maritima, sea plantain Plantago maritima and ox-eye daisy Leucanthemum vulgare are common. Where trampling occurs, or on thin soils, the grassland is characterised by buck's-horn plantain, ribwort plantain Plantago lanceolata, kidney vetch and spring squill Scilla verna. bluebell Hyacinthoides non-scripta is found in more sheltered areas and on upper slopes where it is typically associated with coarse grasses, mainly cock's-foot Dactylis glomerata and scrub communities.

Extensive areas of heath occur generally higher up the cliff profile and on the cliff tops. These are dominated by heather Calluna vulgaris, bell heather Erica cinerea and western gorse Ulex gallii and often display the waved structure characteristic of exposure to saltladen winds. Spring squill, common bird's-foot trefoil Lotus corniculatus, sheep's-bit Jasione montana and wild thyme Thymus drucei are abundant. The maritime communities support two Red Data Book species - the eyebright species Euphrasia vigursii and early meadow-grass Poa infirma. Nationally scarce plants found here include lanceolate spleenwort Asplenium billotti, hairy bird's-foot trefoil Lotus subbiflorus and pale dog-violet Viola lactea.

Between Boscaswell Cliffs and Clodgy Point the site is characterised by a number of wet flushes and an extensive area of mire at Boswednack. The flushes are dominated by purple moor-grass Molinia caerulea and typical species occurring here include cross-leaved heath Erica tetralix, tormentil Potentilla erecta, sharp-flowered rush Juncus acutiflorus and royal fern Osmunda regalis. Other species of note associated with the wet flushes include bog asphodel Narthecium ossifragum, the cottongrass Eriophorum angustifolium and pale butterwort Pinguicula lusitanica. The nationally scarce plants Cornish moneywort Sibthorpia europaea and yellow bartsia Parentucellia viscosa are found at Boswednack.

Scrub communities, including pure stands of bracken Pteridium aquilinum occur on the cliff slopes and tops and particularly in the valleys. European gorse Ulex europaeus, bramble Rubus fruticosus agg. and blackthorn Prunus spinosa are frequent, associated with cock's-foot, bluebell and, locally, honeysuckle Lonicera periclymenum and ivy Hedera helix.

The site supports a typical Cornish cliff bryophyte flora and includes a number of rarities, most notably the Red Data Book moss Tortula solmsii.

The west facing section of the coast between Aire Point and Kenidjack Castle displays examples of fully exposed rocky shore communities. The plants and animals are typical of a wave beaten coast with the lower shore characterised by the brown seaweeds "dabberlocks" Alaria esculenta and "tangle" Laminaria digitalis and pools containing coralline algae Corallina officinalis and pink encrusting Lithothamnion spp.

=== Invertebrates ===
The range of land habitats, many of which are floristically rich, support a diverse and abundant invertebrate fauna, including the following Red Data Book species: the mud snail Lymnaea glabra, the bug Heterogaster artimisae and the hoverfly Microdon mutabilis. Nationally scarce butterflies including the pearl-bordered fritillary Boloria euphrosyne and silver-studded blue Plebejus argus, and the nationally scarce jewel beetle Trachys troglodytes also occur.

Limpets, Patella aspera are abundant and barnacles, mainly Chthamalus stellatus, are plentiful on the upper shore.

=== Birds ===
Cliff ledges provide nesting sites for seabirds including fulmar, shag, black-legged kittiwakes and gulls. Peregrine falcon, chough and raven nest on secluded cliff slopes and carns. Areas of scrub on the cliff tops and in the valleys provide nesting sites for European stonechat, whitethroat and sedge warbler. Grasshopper warblers breed in the scrub associated with the mires at Boswednack, which also provides suitable conditions for wintering water rail, Eurasian woodcock and Eurasian curlew.

The location of this site at the southern-western tip of the British mainland makes it an important resting and feeding area for migratory birds, the more sheltered valleys being of particular importance.

=== Mammals ===
Grey seals are known to breed on this stretch of coast. Offshore islands, notably The Brisons and The Carracks, provide haul out sites for this species.

The disused mines provide roosting sites for bats, including the greater horseshoe bat and Daubenton's bat.

== See also ==
- List of Special Areas of Conservation in Cornwall
