= List of Special Areas of Conservation in Cornwall =

The following is a list of Special Areas of Conservation in Cornwall

- Breney Common and Goss and Tregoss Moors
- Carrine Common
- Crowdy Marsh
- Fal and Helford
- Godrevy Head to St Agnes
- Isles of Scilly Complex
- Lower Bostraze and Leswidden
- Newlyn Downs
- Penhale Dunes
- Phoenix United Mine and Crow's Nest
- Plymouth Sound and Estuaries
- Polruan to Polperro
- River Camel
- St Austell Clay Pits
- The Lizard
- Tintagel-Marsland-Clovelly Coast (see Tintagel, Marsland Valley, Clovelly)
- Tregonning Hill

== See also ==
- List of Sites of Special Scientific Interest in Cornwall
