= Godrevy Head to St Agnes =

Protected area in Cornwall, England

- Site of Special Scientific Interest
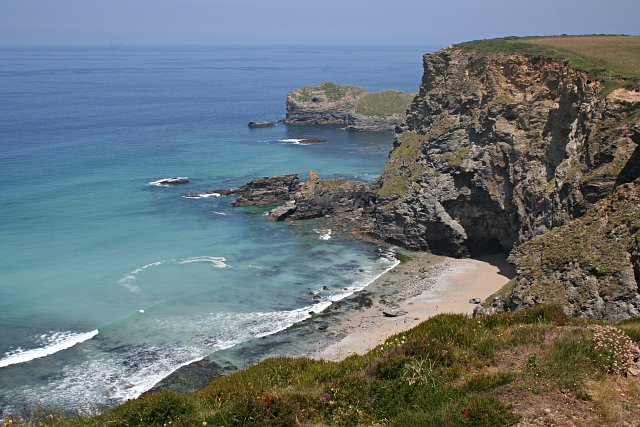
- Bassett's Cove, within the SSSI

- Location within Cornwall Location within England
- Location of Godrevy Head to St Agnes.
- Area of search: Cornwall
- Grid reference: SW582423
- Coordinates: 50.2486°N 5.3187°W
- Interest: Biological/Geological
- Area: 627.4 hectares (6.3 km^{2}; 2.4 sq mi)
- Notification date: 1951

Godrevy Head to St Agnes is a coastal Site of Special Scientific Interest (SSSI) in north Cornwall, England], noted for both its biological and geological characteristics. A number of rare and scarce plant species can be found on the site, along with many breeding seabirds.

== Geography ==
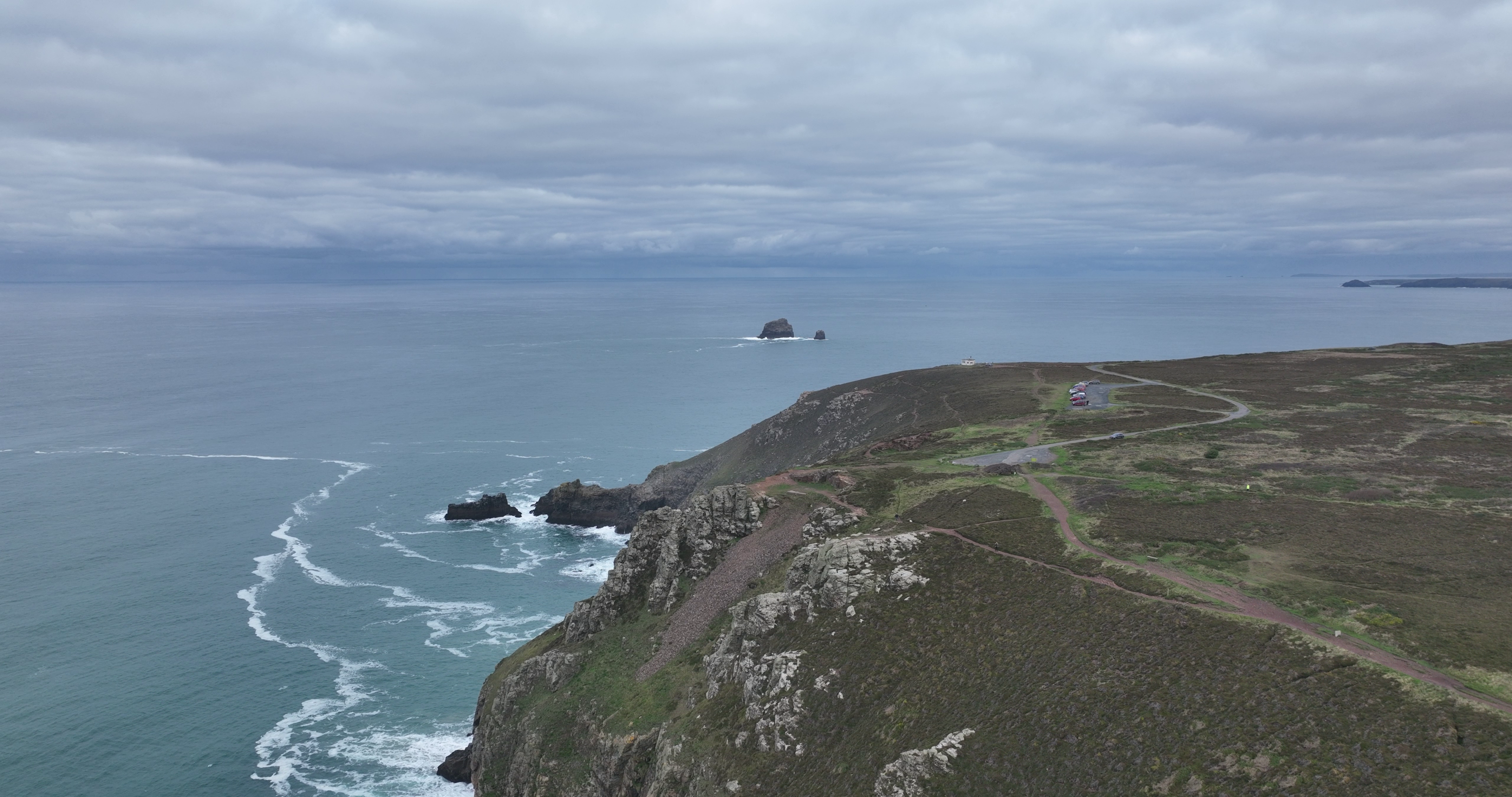
St Agnes Head coastline from the air.

The 627-hectare (1,550-acre) site, notified in 1951, is situated along the north Cornwall coast of the Celtic Sea in the Atlantic Ocean. It starts at Godrevy Head (with the Godrevy Towans) in the west and continues for 20 kilometres (12 mi) to the north east, through Portreath, Porthtowan and ends just past St Agnes Head, north of the village of St Agnes.

The South West Coast Path runs through the SSSI and part of the coastline is owned by the National Trust. Other parts of this coastline is owned by the Ministry of Defence.

Large sections of this site lie within the Cornwall Area of Outstanding Natural Beauty (AONB).

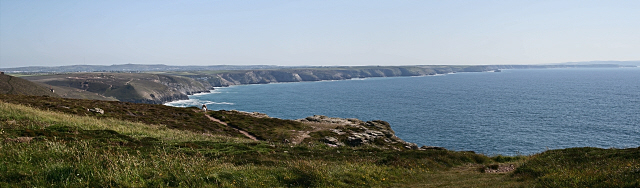
Coastline of the SSSI

== Geology ==
The SSSI is predominantly situated on Devonian sandstones and shales, with the area around St Agnes formed from Grampound grit.

== Wildlife and ecology ==
The site provides a variety of different habitats, including cliffs, maritime grassland, maritime heathland, sand dunes and scrubland which are host to numerous plant species and seabird colonies. For its flora the site is also designated a Special Area of Conservation.

=== Flora ===
The whole of this SSSI, as well as Cligga Head SSSI, has been designated as Godrevy Head to Cligga Point Important Plant Area, by the environmental organisation Plantlife, for it flora.

The nationally rare species of shore dock (Rumex rupestris) and wild asparagus (Asparagus officinalis) can be found in the maritime grassland habitats, along with the also nationally rare carrot-broomrape (Orobanche maritima), a parasite of wild carrot (Daucus carota).

Amongst the common plant species of the maritime heathland the nationally rare Cornish eyebright (Euphrasia vigursii), Dorset heath (Erica ciliaris) and hairy greenweed (Genista pilosa) can be found as well as the generally rare pale dog-violet (Viola lactea).

The sand dunes, found around the east of the site at the Godrevy Towans, supports the nationally rare slender bird's-foot trefoil (Lotus angustissimus). Within the calcareous grassland section of the dunes the rare Portland spurge (Euphorbia portlandica) can be found, as well as a large colony of spotted cat's-ear (Hypochaeris maculata), which are nationally rare.

=== Fauna ===
The site contains 25 species of butterfly and 15 dragonfly and damselfly species, which include the nationally scarce varieties of silver-studded blue (Plebejus argus) and blue-tailed damselfly (Ischnura pumilio).

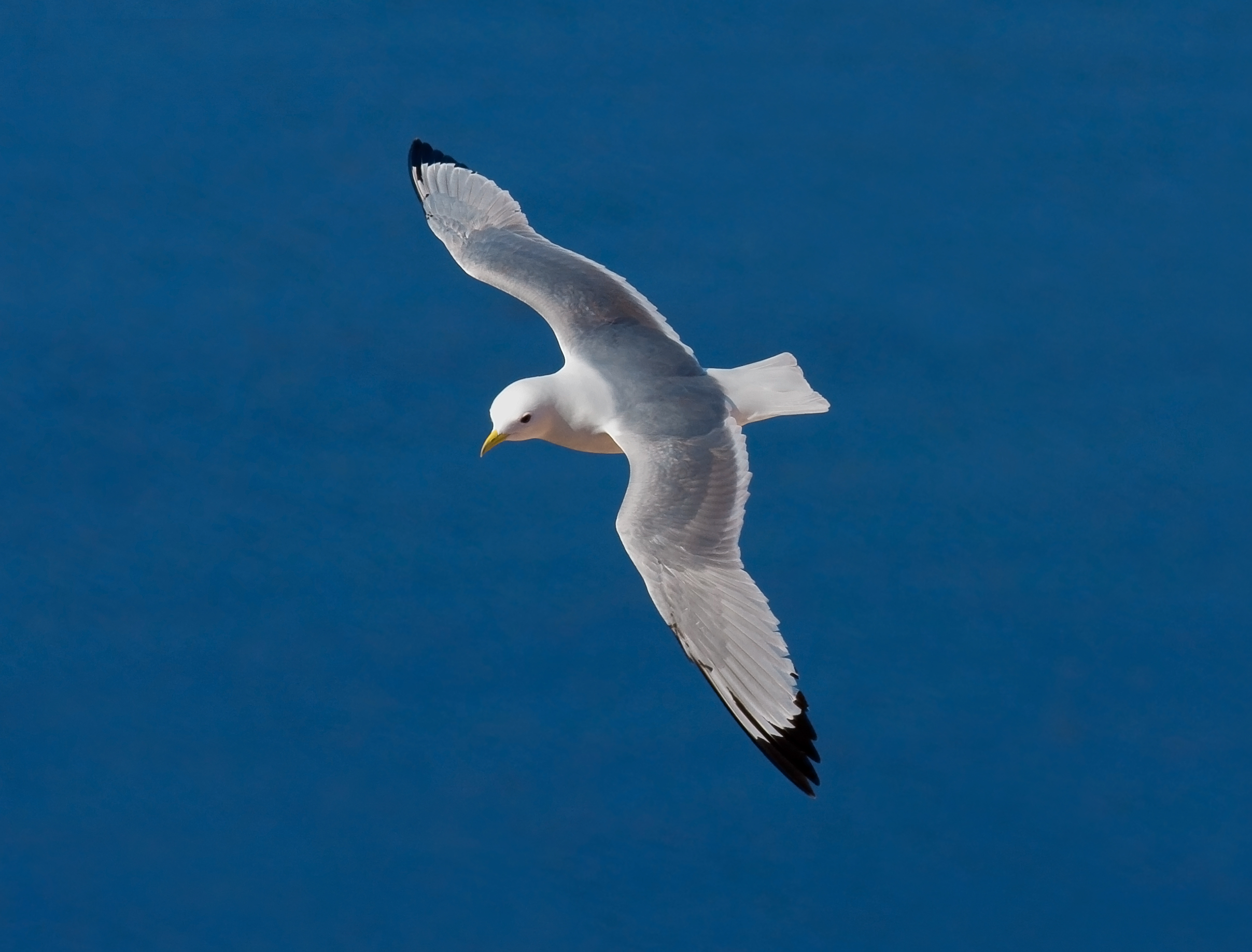
A Black-legged Kittiwake, found on the site, in flight

Scarlet and gold star coral are present within the rocky intertidal shores, rare for the Cornish coast; with grey seal (Halichoerus grypus) having breeding sites within the inaccessible sea caves. The rest of the cliffs, along with the offshore islands, are an important breeding site for a variety of seabird species and are home to the largest Cornish breeding colony of black-legged kittiwake (Rissa tridactyla), with 1000–5000 birds being recorded in the area.
