= River Gannel =

River in Cornwall, England

Gannel
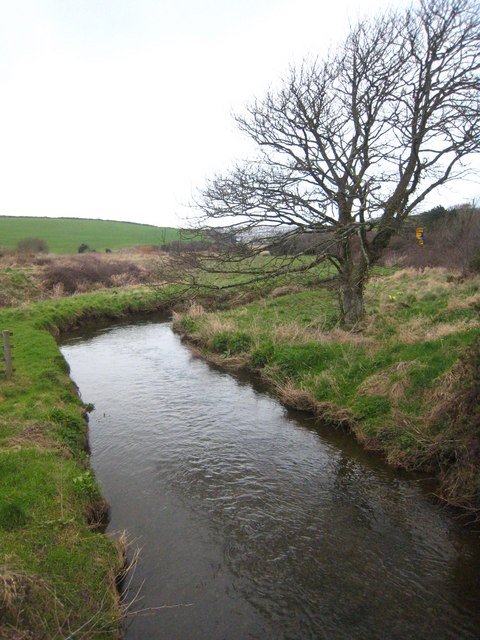
- The River Gannel below Trevemper Bridge
- Native name: Dowr Gwyles (Cornish)

Location
- Country: England
- Region: Cornwall

Physical characteristics
- Source
  - location: Carland Cross
  - coordinates: 50.3492°N 5.0256°W
  - elevation: 115 m (377 ft)
- Mouth: Atlantic Ocean
  - location: Pentire
  - coordinates: 50.4103°N 5.1243°W
  - elevation: 0 m (0 ft)
- Length: 13 km (8.1 mi)

The River Gannel (Cornish: Dowr Gwyles, meaning "lovage river") rises in the village of Indian Queens in mid Cornwall, England, United Kingdom. It flows north under Trevemper Bridge and becomes a tidal estuary, the Gannel (Cornish: An Ganel, meaning "the Channel"), that divides the town of Newquay from the village of Crantock and joins the Celtic Sea. The Newlyn Downs form part of the catchment area of the river. The principle tributary of the Gannel is the Benny Stream. Since January 2016 the Gannel estuary, as far as the tidal limit, has been part of the Newquay and the Gannel Marine Conservation Zone.

== History ==
The Gannel Estuary, Cornwall: Archaeological and Historical Assessment, published by the Cornwall Archaeological Unit concluded that human activity around the Gannel could be dated to the Mesolithic period.

Sean Taylor, an archaeologist at Cornwall Council's archaeological unit, said of the area, "It's starting to look like this part of Newquay, alongside the River Gannel, was a very important and densely populated area from the Neolithic (c 4000BC) onwards. The estuary undoubtedly formed an important link with the outside world throughout prehistory." Finds alongside the Gannel include three Bronze Age roundhouses.

In 2007 a 'Wraxall' class neck ring was found at Pentire, indicating the area around the Gannel was inhabited in the late Iron Age.

During the medieval period sandrock was quarried on the beach at Crantock. The quarry is now covered by dunes. Use of this poor quality stone may have contributed to the collapse of an earlier tower at St Carantoc's Church, in the 14th century.

John Woodward (1688–1728) recorded that iron ore was mined from a large vein on Perran Beach. In the 1860s ore was moved up the cliff by a 'puffer' engine. It was then transported from Gravel Hill Mine, at the north end of Perran Beach, to a quay on the Gannel.

During the eighteenth and nineteenth centuries tin mining took place at Chiverton Wheal Rose, also known as Trethellan Mine. The ore was accessed from an adit level on the beach.

A shipbuilding industry once existed at Tregunnel on the north shore of the estuary, where, from 1858 to 1881, Thomas and John Clemens built 10 schooners. At Penpol Creek a ruined lime kiln can be found. Limestone and coal were transported here in the past by barge. Until late in the 20th century the mouth of the Gannel was used by shipping until the silting up of the narrow channel and the development of Newquay harbour.

In 2014, storms damaged a wall that altered the course of the river, so that it now flows across Crantock beach.

== Wildlife ==
The estuary is an important location for migratory birds. Fulmars, jackdaws and pigeons can be seen nesting at Pipers Hole, a deep cleft on the west side of the beach on the estuary. Weever fish can be found particularly at low tide. The rare giant goby can be found within the marine conservation zone, and anemones, sponges, sea mats and sea squirts can be found below the low water mark at the mouth of the estuary. Trout, lamprey, eel, and bullhead have been recorded in the freshwater portion of the river.

== Ferry ==
A seasonal ferry runs from the Fern Pit across to Crantock beach.

== In popular culture ==
The river is known for a legend called the Gannel Crake, an unusual noise which might be heard "crying out". During the 19th century it was described as being like "a thousand voices pent up in misery, with one long wail dying away in the distance". It is traditionally referred to by the superstitious natives as the cry of a troubled spirit that ever haunts the scene.

The Gannel estuary was depicted in the painting Crossing the Gannel by William Prater.

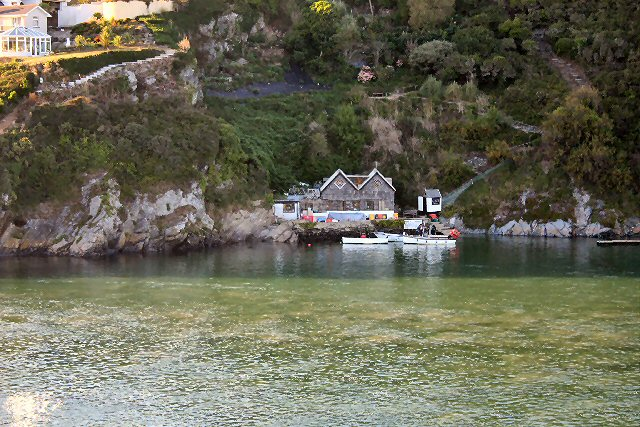
Gannel Ferry

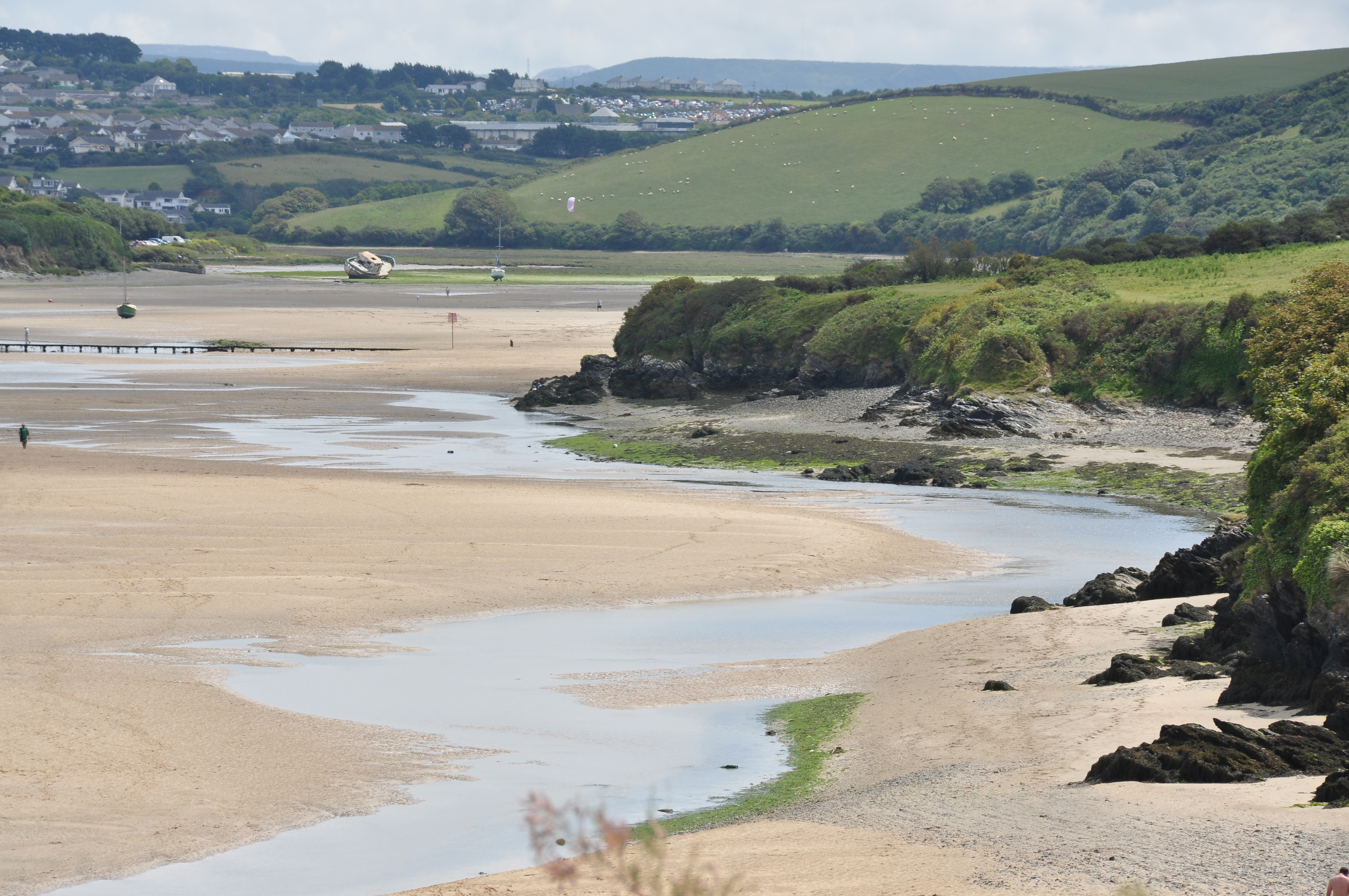
The Gannel above Crantock Beach

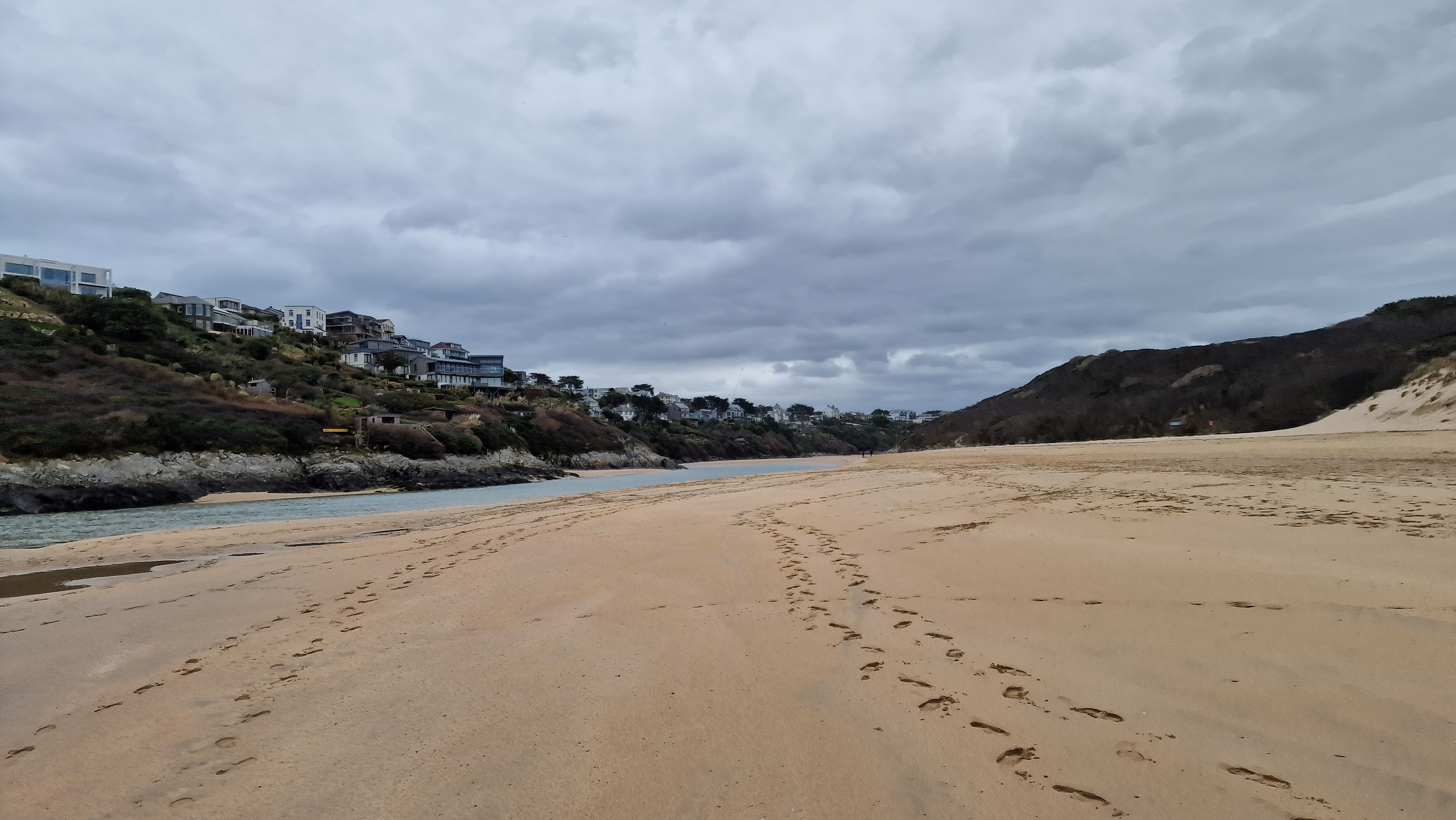
The river at Crantock Beach
