= Polyne Quarry =

Quarry in Cornwall, England

Coordinates: 50.3506°N 4.4957°W

Polyne Quarry (grid reference SX225531) is a 0.1 hectare Site of Special Scientific Interest (SSSI) in Cornwall, England, UK. It is located to the north of Polperro civil parish, 2 miles (3.2 km) to the west of Looe.

The SSSI was designated in 1988 for its geological interest.
