= Polruan to Polperro =

Protected area in Cornwall, England

- Site of Special Scientific Interest
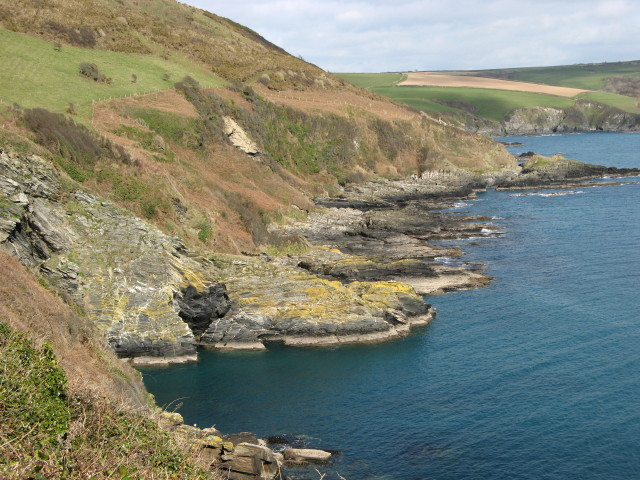
- Coastline to the east of the SSSI

- Location within Cornwall Location within England
- Location of Polruan to Polperro.
- Area of search: Cornwall
- Grid reference: SX170509
- Coordinates: 50.3325°N 4.5877°W
- Interest: Biological
- Area: 213.4 hectares (2.13 km^{2}; 0.824 sq mi)
- Notification date: 1951

Polruan to Polperro is a coastal Site of Special Scientific Interest (SSSI) and Special Area of Conservation (SAC) in south-east Cornwall, England, UK, noted for its biological interest. It contains a wide variety of plant species and is a site for populations of breeding birds.

== Geography ==
The 213.5-hectare (528-acre) site, notified in 1951, is located on the south-east coast of Cornwall along the English Channel, 2 miles (3.2 km) east of the town of Fowey. It starts in the west outside the fishing village of Polruan and ends at the start of the fishing harbour and village of Polperro to the east, all within the civil parishes of Lanteglos and Polperro.

The South West Coast Path runs through the SSSI and the majority of the coastline is owned by the National Trust.

== Wildlife and ecology ==
=== Flora ===
The SSSI and SAC supports various different habitats, including shingle beaches, maritime grassland, scrubland, abandoned field systems and several cliff communities. For this reason this SSSI falls within Plantlife's Polruan to Looe Cliffs Important Plant Area.

The shingle beach habitat contains some flora that has a very limited coverage within Cornwall, as well as the rest of the UK. Examples include Babington's orache (Atriplex glabriuscula), Ray’s knotgrass (Polygonum oxyspermum), sand couch (Elymus farctus), sea bindweed (Calystegia soldanella), sea kale (Crambe maritima), sea spurge (Euphorbia paralias) and sea sandwort (Honckenya peploides).

The nationally scarce ivy broomrape (Orobanche hederae), lanceolate spleenwort (Asplenium billottii) and maidenhair fern (Adiantum capillus-veneris) can be found in within rock crevices along the cliff habitats. Various calcicole and lichen species are also present here.

The limited areas of maritime grassland have an abundance of red fescue (Festuca rubra), also present within rock crevices and rocky ledges. Other areas of maintained grassland contain flora such as common bent (Agrostis capillaris), common bird'sfoot trefoil (Lotus corniculatus), common cat's-ear (Hypochaeris radicata), common dog-violet (Viola riviniana), common milkwort (Polygala vulgaris), common knapweed (Centaurea nigra), common restharrow (Ononis repens), ribwort plantain (Plantago lanceolata), sweet vernal-grass, yarrow (Achillea millefolium), woodrush (Luzula campestris), wild thyme (Thymus serpyllum) and Yorkshire fog (Holcus lanatus). Also present in the grassland and grassy embankments are the nationally scarce slender bird'sfoot trefoil (Lotus angustissimus) and hairy bird's-foot trefoil (Lotus subbiflorus).

Large areas of unimproved grassland can also be found within the site. These contain a wide variety of species within the species-rich, neutral grassland and are considered nationally scarce as well as being exceptionally rare for Cornwall.

=== Fauna ===
The site contains many invertebrates including the uncommon scarlet tiger moth (Callimorpha dominula) and the nationally scarce pearl-bordered fritillary (Boloria euphrosyne). Pasture areas within the site supports the scarce hornet robberfly (Asilus crabroniformis).

Numerous breeding bird colonies can be found, with examples of the Red Data Book species Dartford warbler (Sylvia undata) and peregrine falcon (Falco peregrinus) being recorded on the site.
