= Cuckoo Rock to Turbot Point =

Coordinates: 50.2357°N 4.8524°W

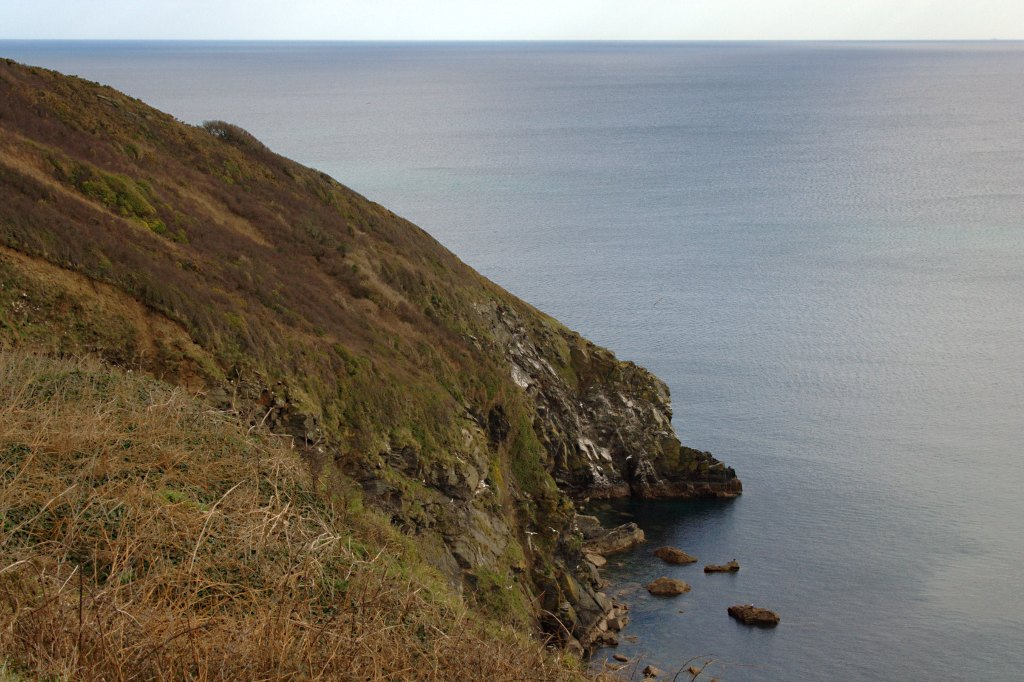
Manare Point

Cuckoo Rock to Turbot Point is a coastal Geological Conservation Review site and Site of Special Scientific Interest (SSSI) in Cornwall, England, UK, noted for its geological interest.

Parts of the land designated as Cuckoo Rock to Turbot Point Site of Special Scientific Interest are owned by the National Trust.

== Geography ==
The 102.5-hectare (253-acre) site, notified in 1998, surrounds Veryan Bay on the south Cornish coast, 13 kilometres (8.1 mi) south-east of the city of Truro. It starts in the west at Manare Point, south of Portloe and ends at Gell Point, passing through the shores at Caerhays Castle.
