= Carnewas and Bedruthan Steps =

Coastline and cliffs in Cornwall, United Kingdom

Coordinates: 50.488°N 5.03465°W

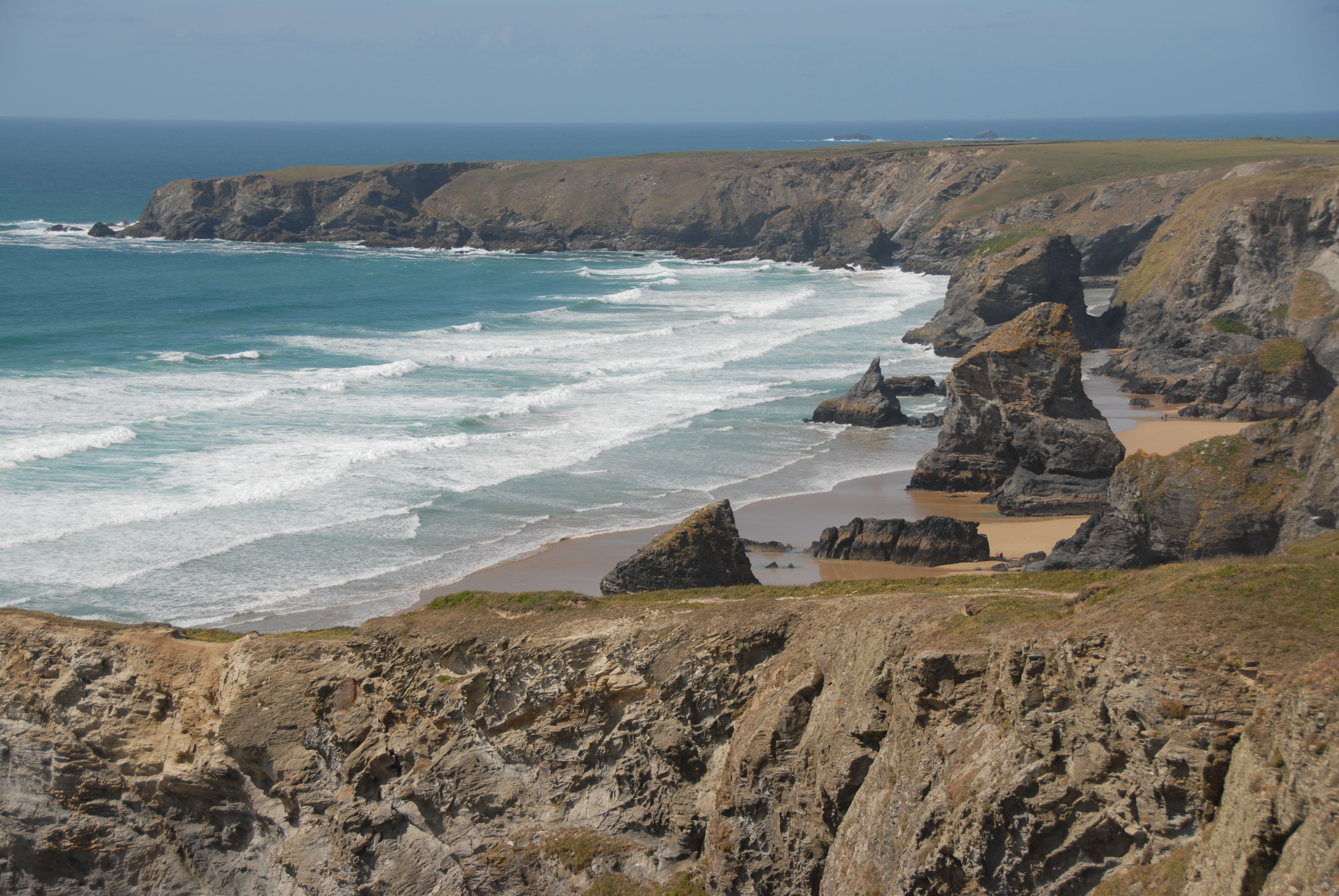
The Bedruthan Steps

Carnewas and Bedruthan Steps (Cornish: Karn Havos, meaning "rock-pile of summer dwelling" and Cornish: Kammow Bosrudhyn, meaning "steps of Red-one's dwelling") is a stretch of coastline located on the north Cornish coast between Padstow and Newquay, in Cornwall, England, United Kingdom. It is within the parish of St Eval and is part-owned by the National Trust. The trust maintains a shop and café, and the cliff–top views of rocks stretching into the distance along Bedruthan beach make the area a popular attraction for tourists and painters. The property affords walks along the South West Coast Path and the steep steps at Bedruthan allow access to a series of rocky beaches at low tide (not owned by the trust). Signs at the top of the steps down to the beaches warn visitors not to risk swimming in these waters due to heavy rips, fast tides, and submerged rocks.

A rockfall occurred in February 2020 affecting the lower steps and the safety netting on surrounding rocks resulting in closure of the steps.

== History ==
People have been in the area since at least the Bronze Age with six barrows nearby to the north, and overlooking Bedruthan Steps is Redcliff Castle, which dates back to at least the Iron Age. Redcliff Castle has three ramparts divided by two ditches, part of which have been quarried to improve the defences. Much of the internal parts of the castle have been eroded by the sea. A second castle is within a mile to the north at Park Head and two miles to the south at Griffin's Point, a third. Cliff Castles or promontory forts are defensive structures that are thought by archaeologists to have been permanently occupied. In 2009, a menhir or longstone was discovered in a boundary hedge close to the coastpath. The stone lies on its side and is 9 ft (2.7 m) long.

Evidence of mining exists as shafts on the cliffs nearby at Trenance Point, and adits above the beach at Carnewas. Carnewas mine itself started in 1855 and followed a lead lode accessible from near the tideline at low water with lodes containing silver, copper/antimony (tetrahedrite) and nickel at a lower level. This working ceased operation in 1863 but the workings were opened again in 1868 to extract iron (hematite), closing in 1874 having produced over 6000 tons of iron ore although between 1871 and 1874 total production was only 940 tons. Ladders and steps to the beach are thought to have been needed to reach the mine workings. The National Trust shop was originally the count house (office) of Carnewas Mine, and the cafe was one of the mine buildings.

The name Bedruthan Steps is said to be taken from a mythological giant called Bedruthan, who used the rocks (stacks) on the beach as stepping stones, and seems to be a late-19th-century invention for Victorian tourists. The first written record of the name is from the West Briton newspaper in February 1847 and is likely to refer to one of two cliff staircases used by miners to get to the mine workings and now refers to the whole beach.

Each of the stacks has a name and from north to south they are Queen Bess, Samaritan Island, Redcove Island, Pendarves Island, and Carnewas Island. Queen Bess rock was so named as it was supposed to resemble the outline of Queen Elizabeth I, although the head was lost after a storm in 1981. Samaritan Island is named after a ship the Good Samaritan, which was wrecked there in October 1846 with the loss of nine lives (another source states that the wreck occurred in 1850). A rhyme written at the time states, "The Good Samaritan came ashore, To feed the hungry and clothe the poor, With barrels of beef and bales of linen, No poor soul shall want for a shilling"

== Environment ==
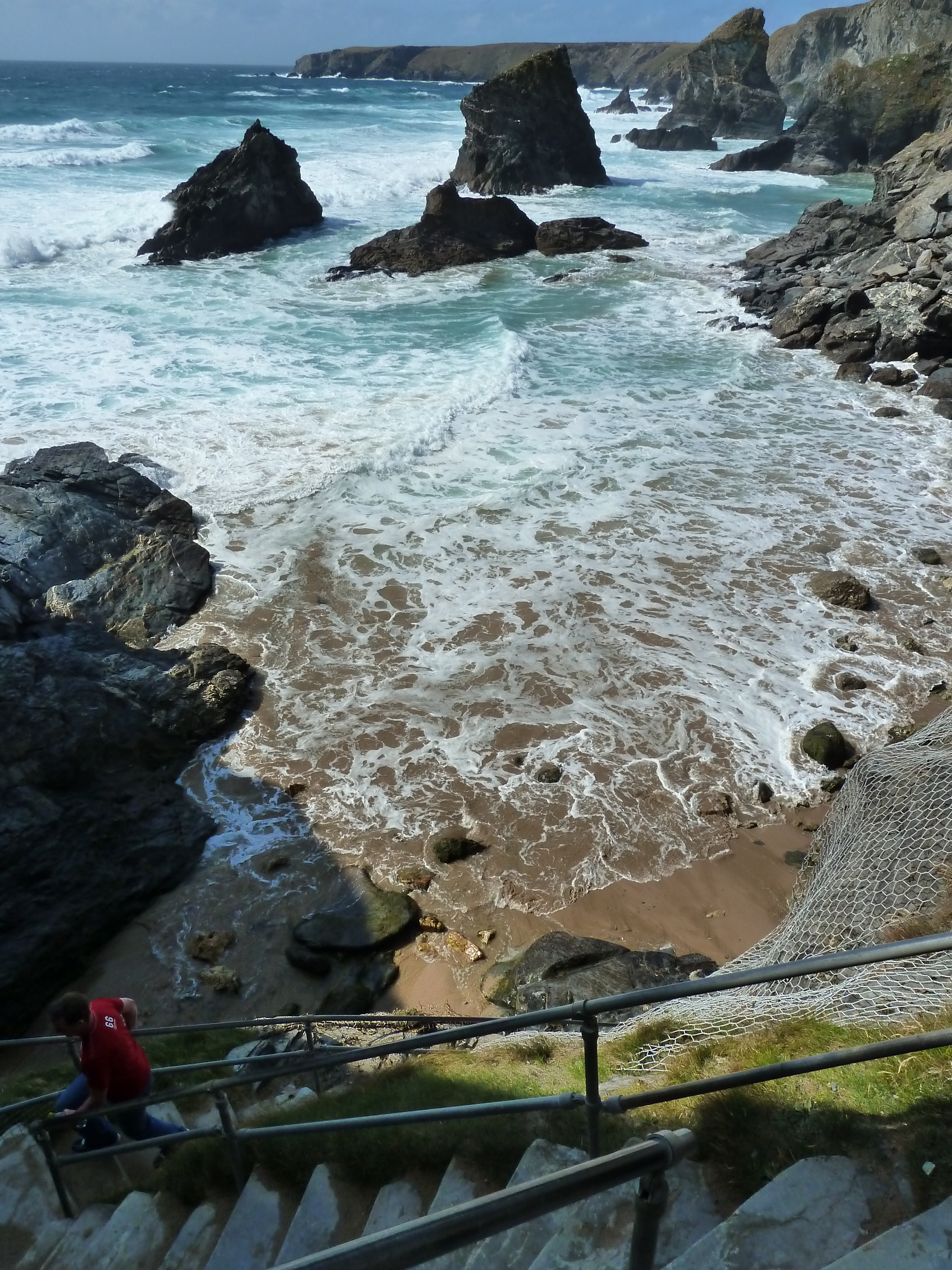
Bedruthan Steps from halfway point

The section of coastline from Carnewas to Stepper Point is part of the Cornwall National Landscape and subject to special landscape protection. In addition, Bedruthan Steps and Park Head is an 80.8-hectare (200-acre) Site of Special Scientific Interest, designated for its geological and biological interest in 1951. The site was subject to a revision in 1973 and renotified in 1986. It is noted for its slates and fossils from the Middle Devonian, various mosses, and beetles. Bedruthan Steps is also a Geological Conservation Review site because it is a ″source of rare fish specimens″, which were first reported in 1848 by W Pengelly.

Flora

The coast here is exposed to westerly winds and the clifftops provide an exposed environment best suited to low-growing plants. Flowers to be found along the cost between Mawgan Porth and Bedruthan include Bird's foot trefoil, Kidney vetch, Sheep's-bit and Spring squill, plus the distinctly maritime species Sea Pink (Thrift) and Sea Campion.

Geology

The bedrock at Bedruthan Steps is at the northernmost extent of a series of sedimentary rocks classified as sandstone, siltstone and mudstone and known as the Bedruthan Formation. The underlying rock from Bedruthan Steps to Trevose Head is Middle Devonian slates (386–377 Ma) with Staddon Grits to the south towards Trenance Point. The thickness of the slates have been estimated at over 2,000 m (6,600 ft). Marine erosion by the sea carrying sand and pebbles has worn away the weaker, softer rocks to leave the stacks seen today. Fossils of fish, corals, trilobites, etc. have been found in the Eifelian slates on Samaritan and Pendarves Islands. Few fossils are useful for dating here, but one (although considered to be problematical) Pteroconus mirus dates the formations to the Eifelian. At the end of the headland of Park Head (grid reference SW840708) is a subvolcanic rock, dolerite.

Dark Sky discovery site

In 2014, the area was granted "Dark Sky" status by the Science and Technology Facilities Council. Dark Sky discovery sites must be free from light pollution and have good views of stars and the Milky Way, and be accessible to the public.

== Gallery ==
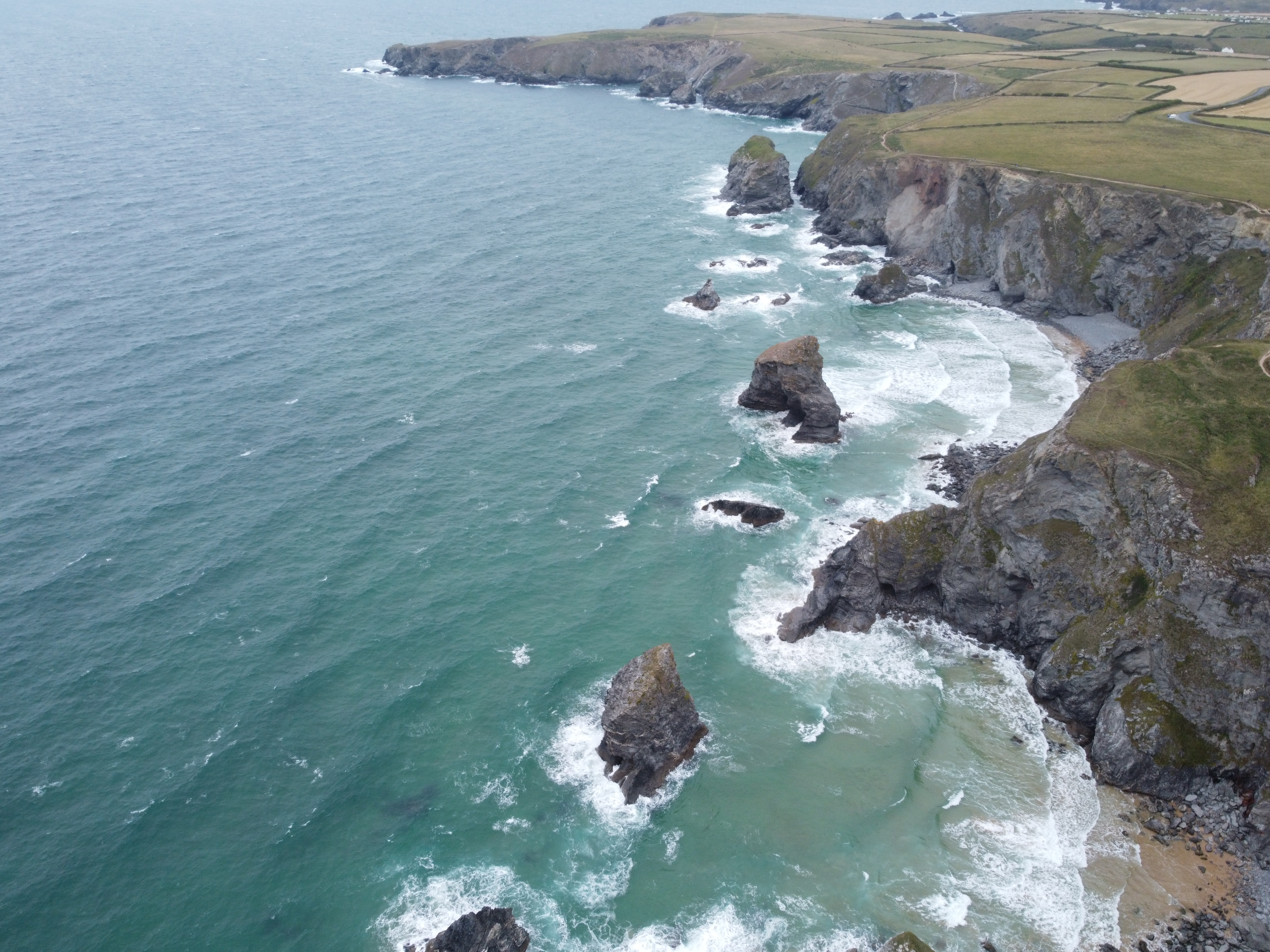

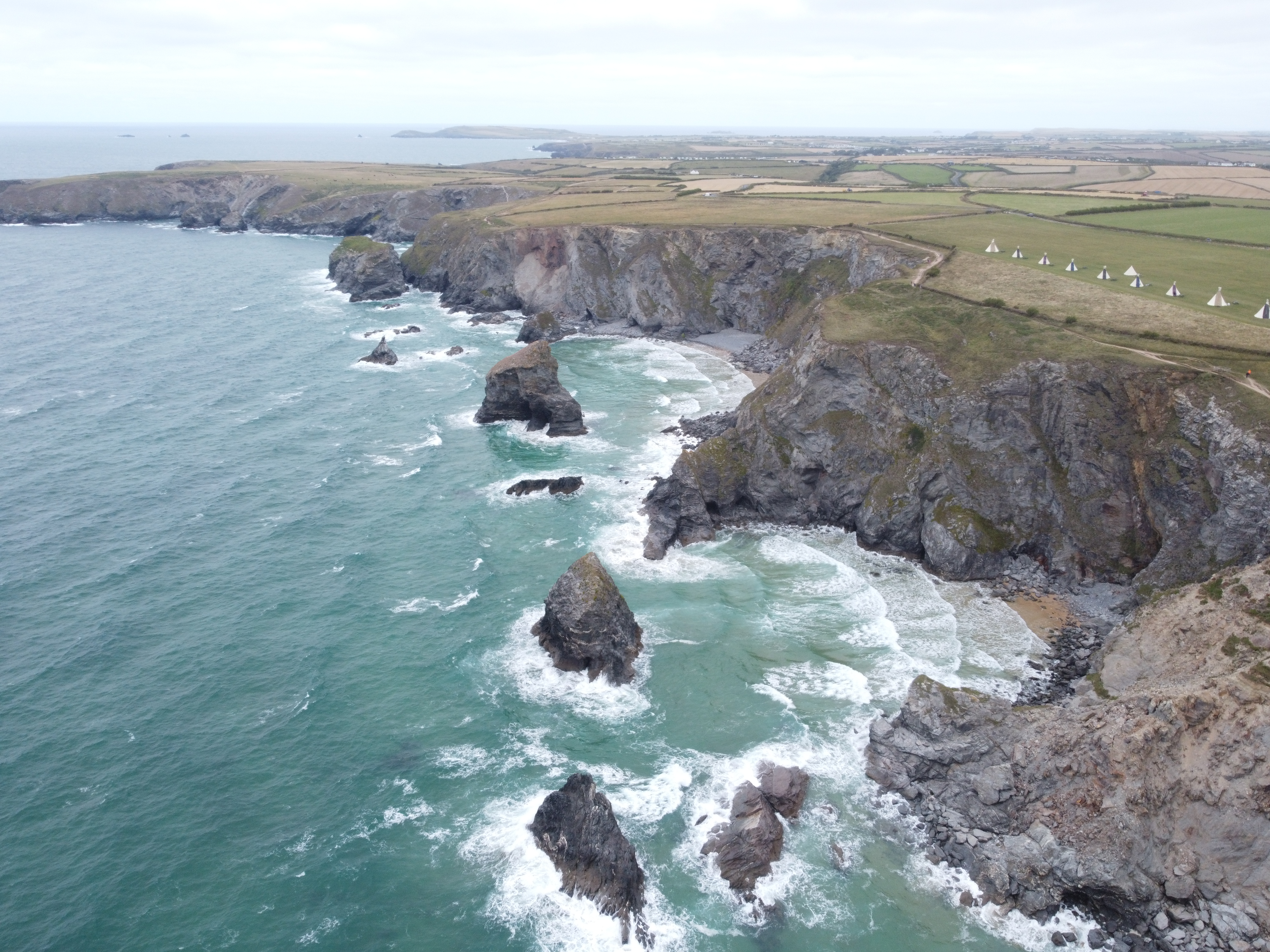
