= Lymsworthy Meadows =

Protected area in Cornwall, England

Coordinates: 50.8709°N 4.4568°W

Lymsworthy Meadows is a Site of Special Scientific Interest (SSSI) in north Cornwall, England, UK, noted for its biological characteristics.

== Geography ==
The 7.7-hectare (19-acre) site, notified in 1992, is situated within Kilkhampton civil parish, 5 miles (8.0 km) north-east of the town of Bude, 1.5 miles (2.4 km) west of the border with Devon.

The streams surrounding the SSSI are tributaries to the upper River Tamar.

== Wildlife and ecology ==
The site's habitat mainly consists of moorland and culm grassland that is relatively untouched by agriculture, being one of only a few such sites remaining in Cornwall. The nationally scarce wavy St John's-wort (Hypericum undulatum) can be found on the site.

A colony of marsh fritillary butterflies (Eurodryas aurinia), a nationally scarce species, is also found on the site.
