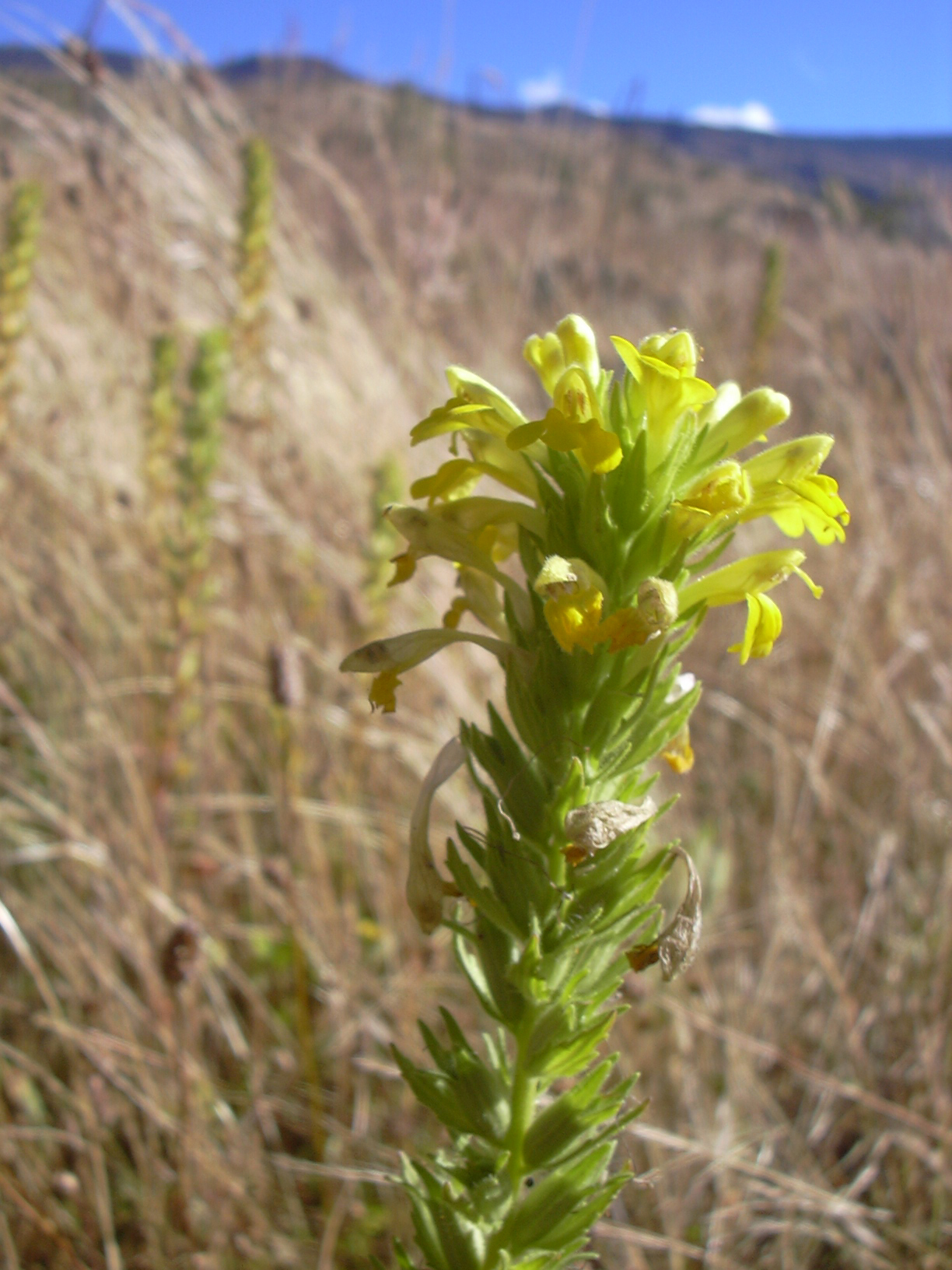

Scientific classification
- Kingdom: Plantae
- Clade: Tracheophytes
- Clade: Angiosperms
- Clade: Eudicots
- Clade: Asterids
- Order: Lamiales
- Family: Orobanchaceae
- Genus: Parentucellia
- Species: P. viscosa

Binomial name
- Parentucellia viscosa (L.) Caruel

Synonyms
- 11, including: Bartsia viscosa L. Bellardia viscosa (L.) Fisch. & C.A.Mey.

= Parentucellia viscosa =

Species of flowering plant

Parentucellia viscosa is a species of flowering plant in the family Orobanchaceae known by the common names yellow bartsia and yellow glandweed. It is native to Europe, but it can be found on other continents, including Australia and North America, as an introduced species.

== Description ==
This is an erect annual herb producing a stiff, slender stem coated in hairs and sticky glands. It reaches a maximum height of 50 to 70 centimeters. The hairy leaves are lance-shaped to oval and are lined with several teeth. The inflorescence is a raceme of flowers at the end of the stem. The flower is tubular, the calyx of sepals extending along most of the length of the corolla, which may exceed 2 centimeters long. The lobed, lipped corolla is yellow in color and glandular and sticky in texture.

The species is a root hemiparasite. It is parasitic on plants in the Poaceae and Fabaceae, and inhibits the health of host species.
