= Retire Common =

Common land in Cornwall, England

Coordinates: 50.4372°N 4.8133°W

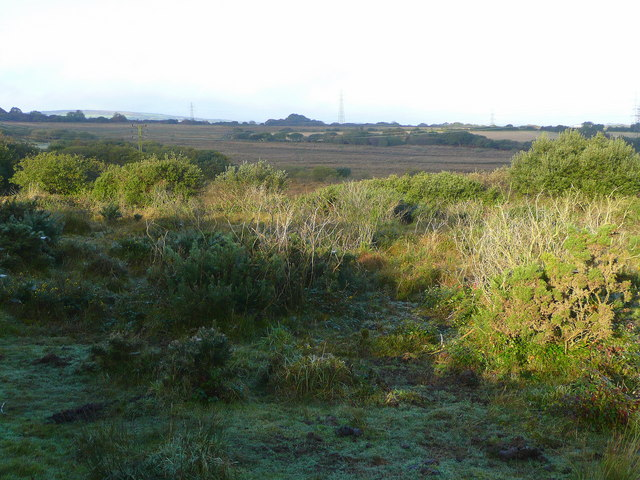
Retire Common

Retire Common is a Site of Special Scientific Interest, noted for its biological characteristics, in mid Cornwall, England, UK.

== Geography ==
The 62-hectare (150-acre) site, notified in 1951, is located 5 miles (8.0 km) south west of the town of Bodmin, falling mainly within the civil parish of Withiel. The springs in the area of the Common form the headwaters of a tributary of the River Camel.
