= Chyenhal Moor =

Site of Special Interest in Cornwall

- Site of Special Scientific Interest
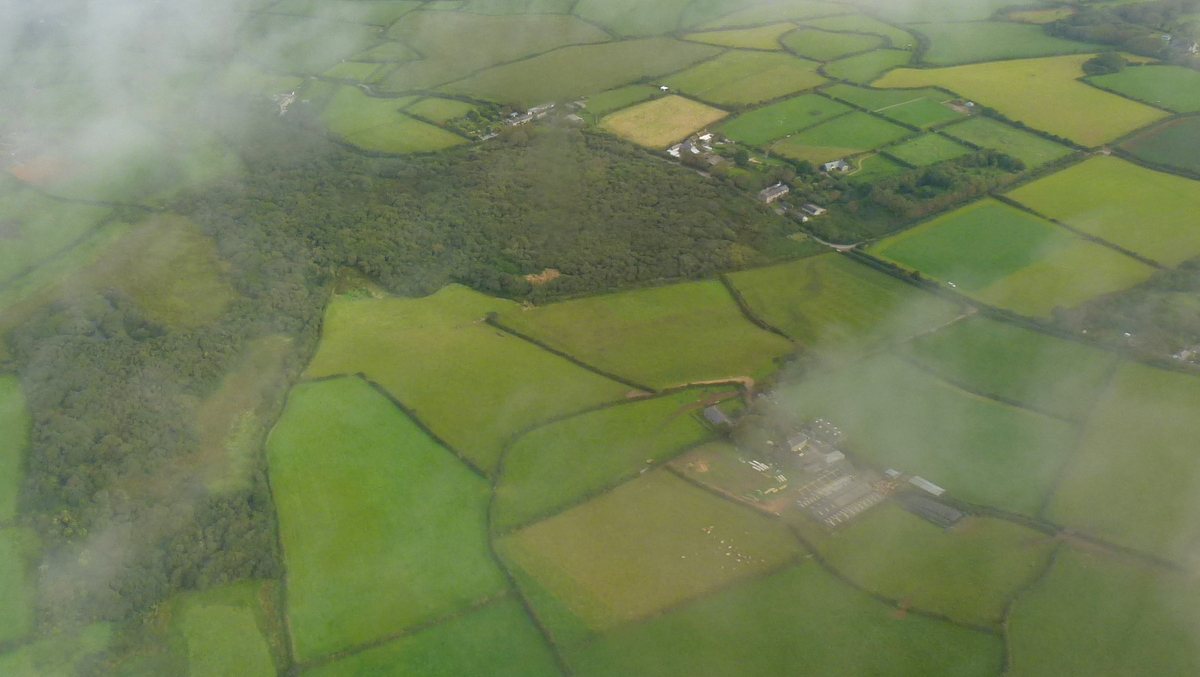

- Location within Southwest Cornwall
- Location of Chyenhal Moor.
- Area of search: Cornwall
- Grid reference: SW448279
- Coordinates: 50.0968°N 5.5708°W
- Interest: Biological
- Area: 11.9 hectares (0.12 km^{2}; 0.046 sq mi)
- Notification date: 1951

Chyenhal Moor is a poorly drained shallow valley, 2 miles (3.2 km) to the south-west of Penzance, Cornwall. Due to several rare plants in a diverse range of habitats, it was notified as a Site of Special Scientific Interest (SSSI) in 1951.

== Geography ==
Chyenhal Moor is a poorly drained shallow valley in the parish of Paul, on the southern side of the Land's End peninsula. The small stream draining the moor flows to Kerris Moor and reaches the sea at Lamorna Cove. The underlying rock is coarsely porphyritic granite and the soils are mostly humic, gleys, covered with varying depths of peat.

== History ==
Until the early 19th-century rough-ground such as Chyenhal Moor was an important part of the rural economy, through the grazing of livestock and cutting of furze (gorse) for fuel. Moorland usually refers to uncultivated land on a hill, but locally it is also applied to wetlands such as this, and the nearby Kerris and Clodgy Moors. The high rainfall, poor drainage and acid conditions inhibit the action of bacteria which break down plant material resulting in the accumulation of a dark brown, fibrous material known as peat. Chyenhal Moor has been a well known location for botany since John Ralfs (1807−1890) found rare plants here.

== Wildlife and ecology ==
The moor was notified as a SSSI because of the diverse range of habitats and rare plants. Willow carr is the dominant habitat, is often dense and reaches a maximum height of 5 m. It is dominated by grey willow (Salix cinerea) with some goat willow (Salix caprea) and the ground flora includes lesser spearwort (Ranunculus flammula), marsh thistle (Cirsium palustre), soft rush (Juncus effusus) and yellow flag (Iris pseudacorus). Within the willow are small patches of wet heath vegetation with Cornish moneywort (Sibthorpia europaea), wavy-leaved St John's wort (Hypericum undulatum) and ivy-leaved bellflower (Hesperocodon hederaceus). In the wetter parts are creeping forget-me-knot (Omphalodes verna), marsh pennywort (Hydrocotyle vulgaris), purple moorgrass (Molinia caerulea) and various species of moss including sphagnums.

A species of note in the south-west corner of the site is pillwort (Pilularia globulifera), a rare fern of wet heathland and acid pools. Plants surrounding the pool include bog pimpernel (Lysimachia tenella, syn. Anagallis tenella), marsh St John's wort (Hypericum elodes), purple moor-grass (Molinia caerulea), ragged robin (Silene flos-cuculi), scaly male-fern (Dryopteris affinis) and water mint (Mentha aquatica). A second, overgrown pond, in the south-east corner of the site has the rare unbranched bur-reed (Sparganium emersum), and a species very rare in Cornwall, ivy-leaved duckweed (Hesperocodon hederaceus). In the more open wet heathy habitats heath spotted orchid (Dactylorhiza maculata), glaucous sedge (Carex flacca) and star sedge (Carex echinata) are found. Seven species of dragonfly have been recorded including the broad-bodied chaser (Libellula depressa) and the four-spotted chaser (Libellula quadrimaculata).

In the north of the site is an open-heathy area dominated by common gorse (Ulex europaeus) and heather (Calluna vulgaris). The rare Dorset heath (Erica ciliaris) was planted here in 1934.

== Culture ==
Chyenhal Moor was the subject of paintings by two Newlyn School artists, Stanhope Forbes and Harold Harvey. Harvey's depicts the winter cutting of furze (gorse) on the moor.
