= The Carracks =

Group of islands off the coast of Cornwall, England

Coordinates: 50.213°N 5.551°W

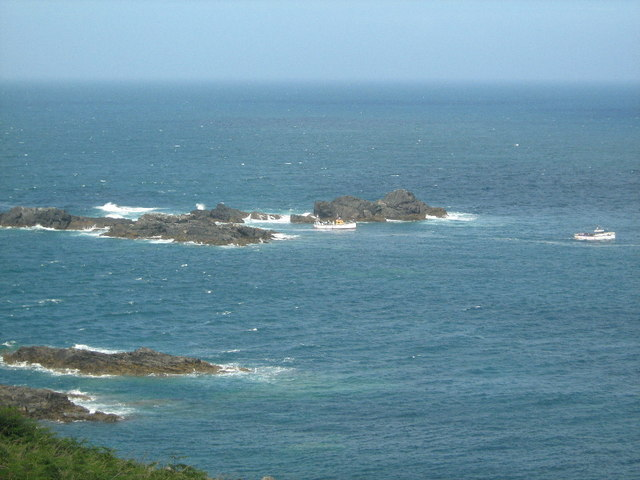
- The Carracks seen from the mainland
- Interactive map of The Carracks

Geography
- Location: Celtic Sea
- OS grid reference: SW430415
- Total islands: 6
- Major islands: Seal Island

Demographics
- Population: 0

The Carracks (Cornish: Kerrek, meaning rocks) and Little Carracks (Cornish: Karrek an Ydhyn, meaning rock of the birds) are a group of small rocky inshore islands off the Atlantic north coast of west Cornwall, England, United Kingdom. The name comes from "carrek", the Cornish language word for 'rock'. The Little Carracks were still known as Carrack an Heythen c. 1920. The islands are in Zennor civil parish.

The islands are located between Zennor and St Ives and are approximately 200 metres (660 ft) off shore; The Little Carracks are between the Carracks and Towednack Quae Head which is east of the islands. The largest island in the group is sometimes referred to as Seal Island and is home to Atlantic grey seals, dogfish, anglerfish and sea anemones.

Boats from St Ives often travel to and from the islands to give visitors the chance to observe the seals and other wildlife on the island.

In 1916, the Enrico Parodi, a 339-foot-long (103 m), 3,818-ton steel vessel, struck Gurnard's Head during thick fog. While being towed, it sank off The Carracks and remains there at present as a diving attraction.
