= Carnkief Pond =

Protected area in Cornwall, England

Coordinates: 50.3263°N 5.1128°W

Carnkief Pond is a Site of Special Scientific Interest in Cornwall, England, UK. This SSSI is noted for its biological interest, including 12 species of dragonfly, and is the only known site in Cornwall for the insectivorous plant Utricularia vulgaris (greater bladderwort).
