= Newlyn Downs =

Protected area in Cornwall, England

Coordinates: 50.3493°N 5.0456°W

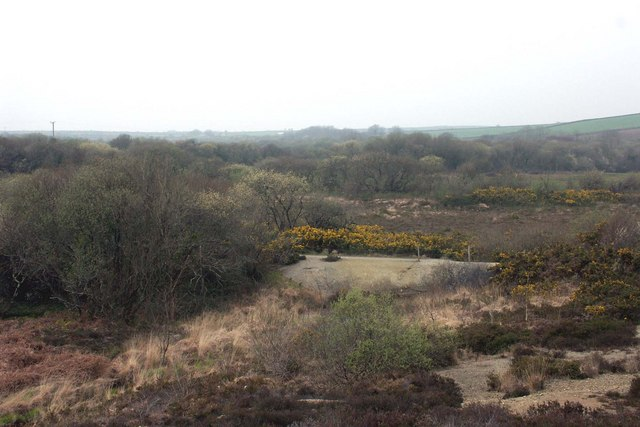
Newlyn Downs

Newlyn Downs is a Site of Special Scientific Interest (SSSI) in north Cornwall, England, UK, noted for its biological characteristics.

== Geography ==
The 115.7-hectare (286-acre) SSSI, notified in 1997, is located mainly within the civil parish of St Newlyn East, 7 kilometres (4.3 mi) south of the town of Newquay. The streams that rise on the site are tributaries of the River Gannel. The Downs are also designated a Special Area of Conservation.

== Wildlife and ecology ==
The soil of the site, deriving from slate-based mudstones and siltstones, is permanently waterlogged in large places. It is the foundation for the largest area in Cornwall of Southern Atlantic wet heath, containing cross-leaved heath (Erica tetralix) and Dorset heath (Erica ciliaris).
