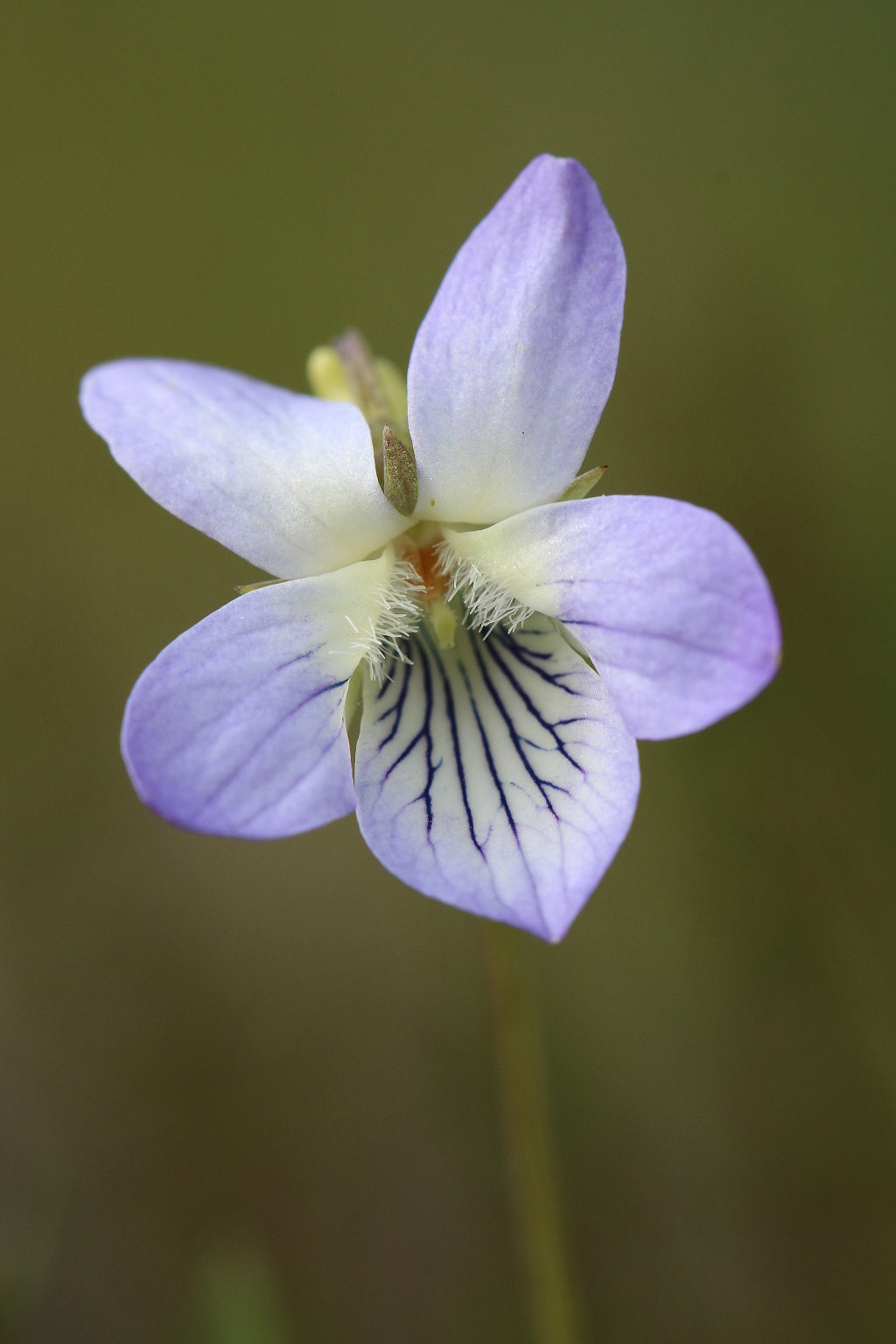
- Flower of V. lactea

Conservation status
- Vulnerable (IUCN 3.1)

Scientific classification
- Kingdom: Plantae
- Clade: Embryophytes
- Clade: Tracheophytes
- Clade: Spermatophytes
- Clade: Angiosperms
- Clade: Eudicots
- Clade: Rosids
- Order: Malpighiales
- Family: Violaceae
- Genus: Viola
- Species: V. lactea

Binomial name
- Viola lactea Sm., 1790

= Viola lactea =

Species of flowering plant

Viola lactea, also known by its common name pale dog violet, is a species of flowering plant in the family Violaceae.

== Description ==
Viola lactea has sparsely hairy creeping stems and a rosette of lanceolate leaves which are cuneate at their base. Each stem has one flower; the flowers are shaped similar to other violets and go from milky-violet to greyish-pink in colour, with the deep purple veins on the lower petal. The presence of green spurs at the back of its flower and the triangular stipules on its upper leaves being equal or longer in length than the leaf stalks differentiate V. lactea from other similar species.

This species hybridizes easily with Viola riviniana, which often occurs in the same habitat. The population of hybrid plants is thought to be increasing where both species are present, especially around the Cornish coast, as the V. riviniana x lactea hybrid outcompetes both its parent species. However, the hybrid plants are generally sterile. V. lactea can also hybridize with Viola canina, though this is much more rare.

== Habitat ==
Viola lactea grows on heathland, and favours areas which are bare or only have short vegetation (due to grazing, burning or other disturbance such as turf cutting).

== Distribution ==
The native range of V. lactea is described as Western European Oceanic. It occurs in the south and west of the British Isles, along the Atlantic coast of France, and in north-western Spain. Its southern reach is in Portugal, around the River Tagus.

Within the British Isles, it is now most common in the New Forest, Dorset, Cornwall, Pembrokeshire and County Kerry; it is no longer found in much of its previous range (especially in South East England) due to habitat decline.

== Protection ==
Viola lactea is classed as 'Vulnerable' within Great Britain and 'Endangered' within England. It is designated as a species "of principal importance for the purpose of conserving biodiversity" under the Natural Environment and Rural Communities Act 2006.
