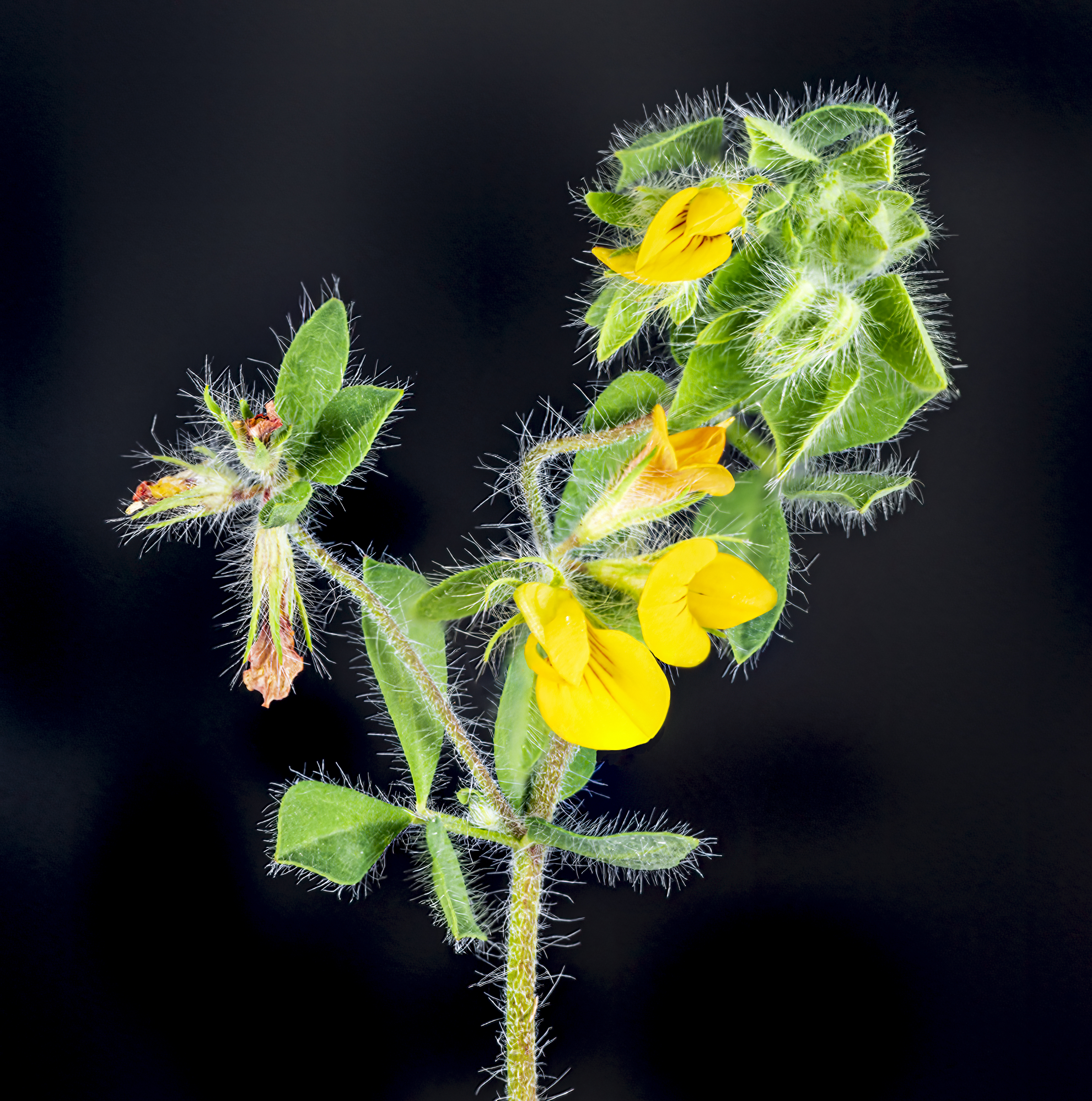

Scientific classification
- Kingdom: Plantae
- Clade: Tracheophytes
- Clade: Angiosperms
- Clade: Eudicots
- Clade: Rosids
- Order: Fabales
- Family: Fabaceae
- Subfamily: Faboideae
- Genus: Lotus
- Species: L. angustissimus

Binomial name
- Lotus angustissimus L.

= Lotus angustissimus =

Species of plant

Lotus angustissimus, the slender bird's foot trefoil, is a plant in the genus Lotus. It has a wide distribution, from Macaronesia to Xinjiang in China.

== Description ==
This plant is an annual identified by hairy red stems, singular yellow flowers looking like those of common vetch, and leaves are oval with spear tips. This plant creates mats on the ground and blooms July to August. This plant has unique reddish seeds.

== Distribution ==
Lotus angustissimus has a wide distribution from Macaronesia, North Africa, Europe and West Asia to the Caucasus, Kazakhstan, Western Siberia and Xinjiang. It has been introduced elsewhere, including California, where it is considered a weed.
