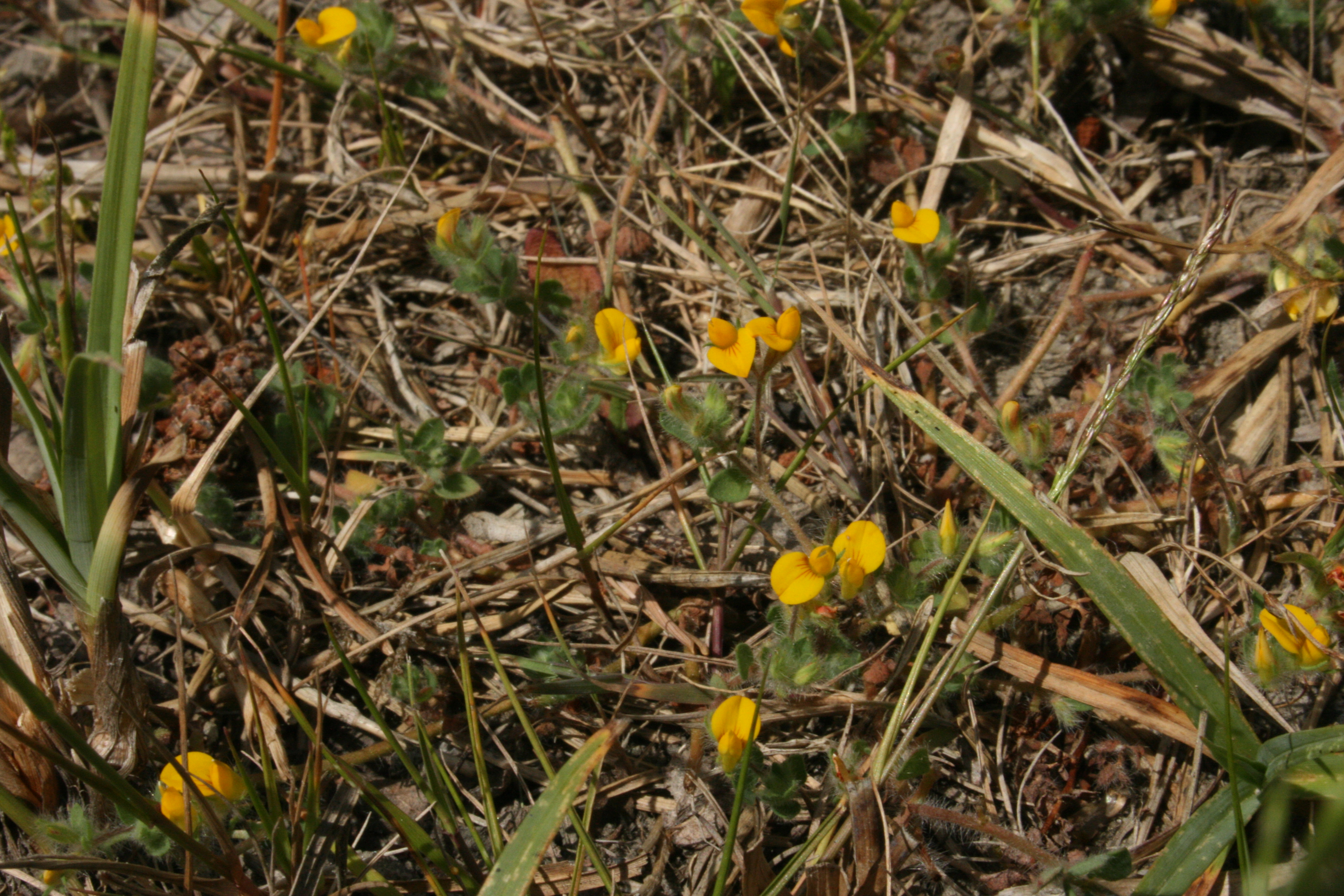

Scientific classification
- Kingdom: Plantae
- Clade: Tracheophytes
- Clade: Angiosperms
- Clade: Eudicots
- Clade: Rosids
- Order: Fabales
- Family: Fabaceae
- Subfamily: Faboideae
- Genus: Lotus
- Species: L. subbiflorus

Binomial name
- Lotus subbiflorus Lag.

Synonyms
- L. suaveolens Pers.; L. hispidus auct. non DC; L. parviflorus auct. non Desf.

= Lotus subbiflorus =

Species of legume

Lotus subbiflorus, the hairy bird's-foot trefoil, is a flowering plant of the pea family Fabaceae.

It is a finely hairy annual plant, growing in dry, sandy ground, often near the sea, and producing sprawling stems with clusters of two to four lemon-yellow pea-type flowers, often with some borne inverted.

== Distribution ==
Its native distribution is in southern and western Europe and North Africa. It occurs as a scarce plant in south-west England, southern Wales, southern Ireland and in the Channel Islands. It also occurs as an introduced species in Hawaii and Australia.
