= The Loving Spirit =

1931 novel by Daphne du Maurier

- First edition
- Author: Daphne du Maurier
- Language: English
- Genre: Family saga
- Set in: Cornwall
- Published: 1931 by Heinemann
- Publication place: United Kingdom
- Media type: Print
- Pages: 339 pp
- OCLC: 5517550

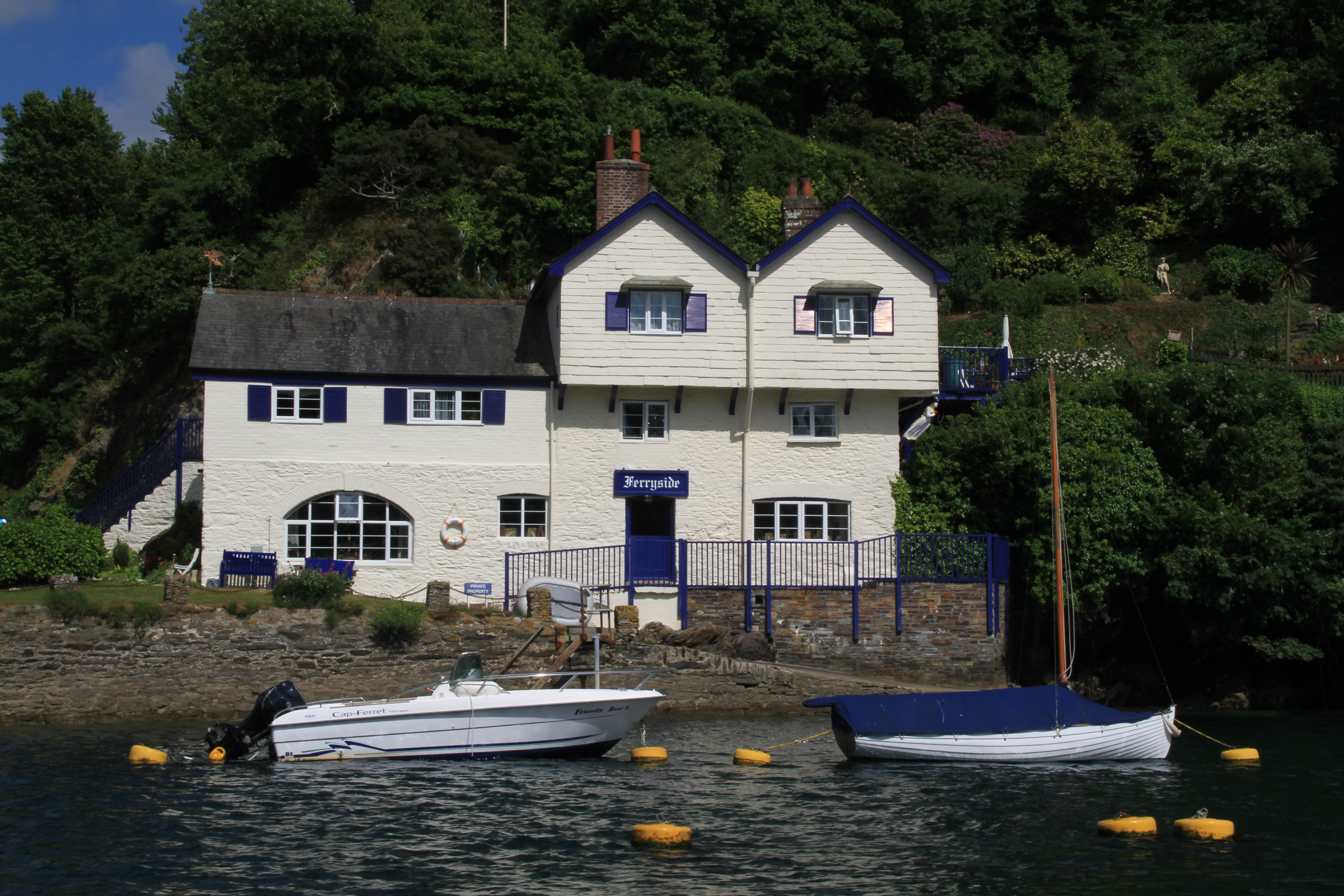
"Ferryside" (Bodinnick), where The Loving Spirit was written

The Loving Spirit was the first novel of Daphne du Maurier and was published in 1931 by William Heinemann. The book takes its name from a line in the poem "Self-Interrogation" by Emily Brontë.

Daphne du Maurier began work on the book in October 1929 at Ferryside, the du Maurier's holiday home in Bodinnick, Cornwall. Ferryside is close to the harbour town of Polruan and opposite Fowey on the south coast of Cornwall.

== Synopsis ==
The novel tells the story of the Coombe family over four generations starting with Janet Coombe, Joseph Coombe, Christopher Coombe and Jennifer Coombe.

The book is based on real events and places, but names are changed and Plyn is an amalgam of Fowey and Polruan and the Slade family name becomes Coombe.

The novel introduces Janet as a young woman who marries Thomas Coombe a ship builder in Plyn. They have several children and the boys follow their father into the family business with the exception of Philip who becomes a clerk at the local shipping office and Joseph, who like Janet, longs to go to sea. Philip features in all chapters of the book and is portrayed as a dark force, withdrawn and distant from the rest of the family.

Fowey was a busy port at this time and Joseph serves his time on board a sea trading vessel. In time Joseph earns his master certificate and the family agree to build their own ship and name it the “Janet Coombe” which Joseph then captains. Tragedy strikes when Janet, who has a weak heart, passes away on the day of the ship launch.

The book transitions to Joseph, who spends most of his time at sea, and later, marries Susan Collins. His ambition for his youngest son, Christopher, is for him to follow in his footsteps. These plans are thwarted when Christopher declares his hatred of the sea and a rift between father and son ensues. Christopher later abandons the Janet Coombe while it was offloading in London and Joseph, distraught by this news, refuses to have anything more to do with Christopher. A rivalry with his brother Philip is fuelled by their courting of the same girl following the death of Joseph’s wife Susan. Joseph wins the girl's hand, but gradually, as failing sight prevents him from going to sea, he broods, becomes mentally unstable and his young wife dies in childbirth. He hears his dead mother Janet calling him and they meet at the castle ruin on the cliff, when he returns his brother Philip has him committed to an asylum.

Christopher returns to Cornwall with a wife and children, but his father Joseph has died at the time of his return. Christopher contacts his uncle Philip about the estate of his father and his shares in the ship. Philip, who has risen to the head position in the shipping business, advises there is nothing left and the shares were used to pay the costs of the asylum. Philip has little to do with the boat-building business or his relatives, but orders the refit to a ship and then refuses to pay. This destroys the family business. At the end of the third part of the book Christopher dies trying to save the Janet Coombe when it is caught in bad weather near the harbour entrance. He saves the damaged boat at the cost of his life and he passes from the story calling out that he has conquered his fear of the sea. The Janet Coombe will never sail again.

The fourth part of the book is about Jennifer Coombe, who is Christopher’s daughter. Taken from Plyn back to London by her mother, she grows up with a hunger to return to Plyn. This she does at age 19 and sets about seeking revenge against Philip for his cruel treatment of her father and grandfather. Jennifer does this by befriending Philip, and then spending his accumulated wealth as quickly as she can on renovations and other good causes. At the same time, she meets her distant cousin John at the place where the ship, the Janet Coombe, had been abandoned. On board the ship, she finds the unopened letters of her father Christopher to his father. The book ends with Philip killing himself and trying to murder Jennifer. Jennifer is rescued by John and they go on to marry at Lanteglos church. The end of the book echoes the opening chapter of Janet Coombe's wedding day.

== Background ==
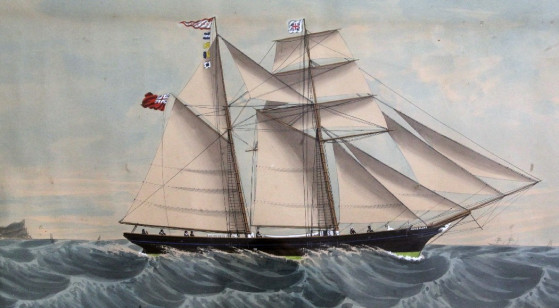
The Schooner Jane Slade of Polruan, named in the book as Janet Coombe

Daphne du Maurier wrote her first novel after a chance discovery in Pont Creek of the wrecked schooner Jane Slade, named after Janet Coombe (Slade), which in turn directly led her to researching the Slade family history and story of Jennifer up to 1929, the year the book was written.

The Jane Slade figurehead was removed from the ship and a fibreglass replica is in place on a beam at Ferryside whilst the original lies within. It can be seen when passing the house from the river and even from the Fowey side of the ferry crossing. Nearby Lanteglos church is where Jane Slade (Janet Coombe) was married and where Jane and other family members are buried.

Daphne du Maurier was married at the same church in 1933 to Frederick Browning who had decided to visit Fowey having read the book The Loving Spirit.
