= Pont, Cornwall =

Coordinates: 50.340°N 4.610°W

Pont
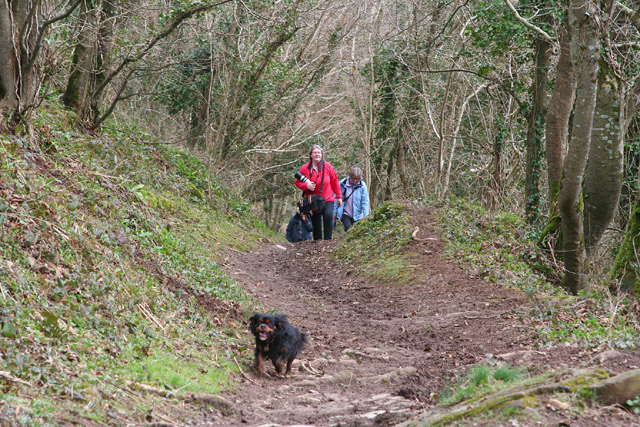
- Hall Walk near Pont

- Location within Cornwall
- OS grid reference: SX144522
- Unitary authority: Cornwall
- Ceremonial county: Cornwall
- Region: South West
- Country: England
- Sovereign state: United Kingdom

Pont is a hamlet in Cornwall, England. Pont is about half a km north of Lanteglos-by-Fowey churchtown and east of Pont Pill.

It is thought that Pont began as a settlement when the parish's first Celtic saint, St Wyllow, came and settled in a cave by the head of Pont around 596.
