= Mybbard and Mancus =

6th century Cornish saints

Mybbard and Mancus were two Cornish saints of the 6th century.

== Meubred ==
Saint Meubred
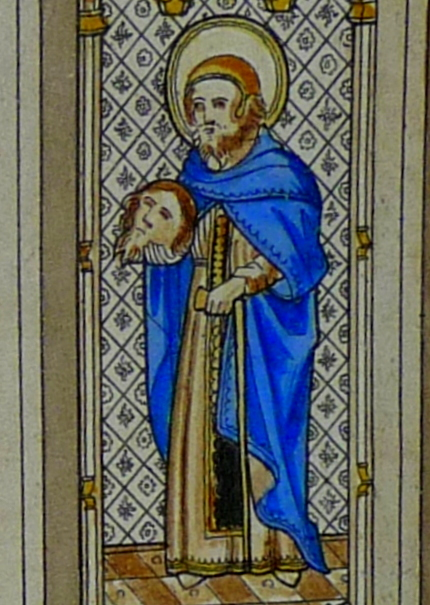
- Born: 5th century Ireland
- Died: 6th century Cardinham
- Canonized: Pre-Congregation
- Feast: Thursday before Whitsun

Mybbard (Mewbred or Mebbred), also known as Calrogus, was a 6th century hermit and is a local Cornish saint said to be the son of a King of Ireland.

Very little is known of his life though he is recorded as having been beheaded, with two others, by the pagan ruler Melyn ys Kynrede in what is today the parish of Lanteglos-by-Fowey, near Fowey, Cornwall.

He was later re-invented as an Irish prince. William Worcester names him as the son of an Irish king who became a Cornish hermit. He was a contemporary of St Mannacus and St Wyllow. An image of him carrying an extra head in his hands is included in a stained glass window in the church of St Neot alongside St Mabyn.

He is said to be interred within the shrine (scrinio) of the Church of St Meubred in Cardinham. Mybbard is regarded as the patron saint of Cardinham.

There is a single dedication, the church of St Meubred, Cardinham, in the Diocese of Truro.

== Manaccus ==
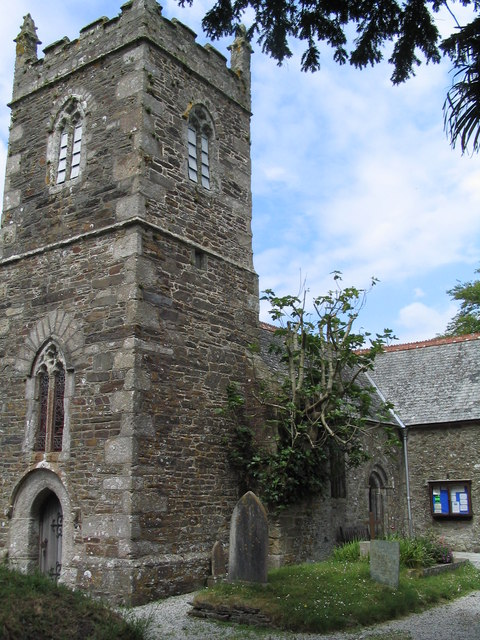
Manaccan church

Manaccus (Manaccan or Mancus) was a 6th-century monk and pre-Congregational Saint of Wales. He was abbot at Caer Gybi, Holyhead, Anglesey and worked with Saint Cybi of Caernarvon.

Mannacus may be the same person as Mancus, Mybbard's companion and also a hermit. Mancus is said, on the authority of Robert Bracey, to lie in the church of Lanreath, two miles from Fowey. However, the canons of Launceston claim he was buried in the parish of Lanteglos.

Both are commemorated on the Thursday next before Whitsunday, along with Saint Wyllow, who was beheaded at the same time.

William of Worcester prefaced the account of the three martyrs by the sentence "there were three brothers under the name of St. Genesius and each carried his head, one of them archbishop of Lismore."

In Cornwall the parish of Manaccan in the Diocese of Truro is named for him. His feast day is 14 October.

== See also ==
- Meneage
