= Readymoney Cove =

Beach near the town of Fowey, United Kingdom

Coordinates: 50.32880°N 4.64556°W

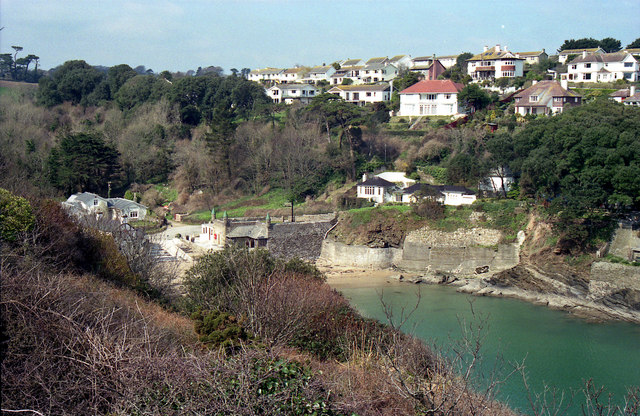
Readymoney Cove from St Catherine's Castle

Readymoney Cove (Cornish: Porth Mundy, meaning mineral house cove) is a sandy beach to the south of the harbour town of Fowey, Cornwall, England, United Kingdom. It is sheltered by cliffs close to the mouth of the River Fowey estuary and bounded, on one side, by the medieval part of the town of Fowey and, on the other, by St Catherine's Castle. The beach can be covered during spring tides. The beach is cleaned daily during high season, and a bathing platform is moored in the bay. There is a small shop with public toilet facilities both of which are open all year round. Dogs are banned between 10am and 6pm during July and August. Above the cove is the former coach house which was the home of author, Daphne du Maurier, for a few years during the Second World War. Comedian Dawn French used to live in a house overlooking the cove.
