= Lanteglos-by-Fowey =

Civil parish in Cornwall, England

Lanteglos: Cornish: Nanseglos
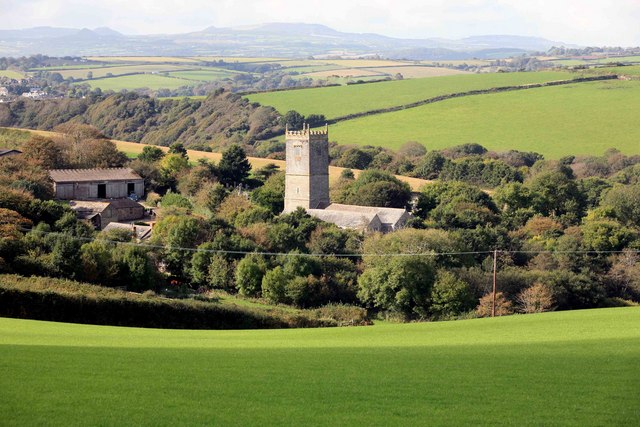
- Parish church of Lanteglos-by-Fowey: St Wyllow

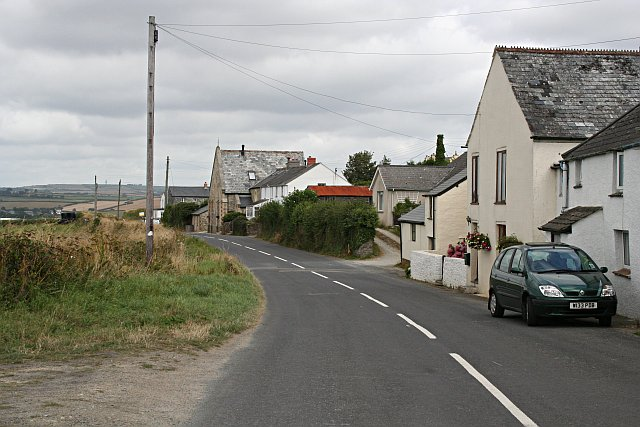
- Lanteglos Highway

- Location within Cornwall
- Population: 944 (2011 Census including Bodinnick)
- OS grid reference: SX1453
- Civil parish: Lanteglos
- Unitary authority: Cornwall
- Ceremonial county: Cornwall
- Region: South West
- Country: England
- Sovereign state: United Kingdom
- Post town: FOWEY
- Postcode district: PL23
- Dialling code: 01726
- Police: Devon and Cornwall
- Fire: Cornwall
- Ambulance: South Western
- UK Parliament: South East Cornwall

Lanteglos (Cornish: Nanseglos, meaning church valley) is a coastal civil parish in south Cornwall, England, United Kingdom. It is on the east side of the tidal estuary of the River Fowey which separates it from the town and civil parish of Fowey. The South West Coast Path runs along the southern coasts of the parish and much of the southern part of the parish lies in the Polruan to Polperro Site of Special Scientific Interest managed by the National Trust.

== Geography ==
To the north, Lanteglos-by-Fowey is bounded by the parish of St Veep, to the east by the parish of Polperro, and to the south by the sea. The parish is in the Liskeard Registration District and the population in the 2001 and 2011 census was 994. Penpol Creek forms part of the northern boundary. The parish church of Saint Wyllow is at Churchtown hamlet (50.334°N 4.608°W) just over a mile (2 km) to the south. St Saviour church (a chapel-of-ease of the parish church) is in Polruan, the largest settlement in the parish.

The village of Lanteglos Highway is in the north of the parish. The hamlet of Whitecross (50.346°N 4.616°W) lies between Lanteglos Highway and Bodinnick. It has a village hall. The hamlet of Mixtow lies on the River Fowey to the west. There was a lime kiln here and a watermill to the north at Castle. The riverside village of Bodinnick lies to the west of the parish. A car ferry to Fowey departs from there.

Pont Pill is a tidal creek which runs through the parish. The hamlet of Pont (50.334°N 4.608°W) lies on the stream running into the pill. There was a quay, granary, two limekilns, malt house, warehouse, corn mill, three watermills (dating from 1298, 1309 and 1423) a sawmill, beer house and blacksmith in Pont. An isolation hospital for sailors with Yellow Fever was built further down the pill toward Polruan. Lantic Bay is a beach on the coast.

== Parish church ==
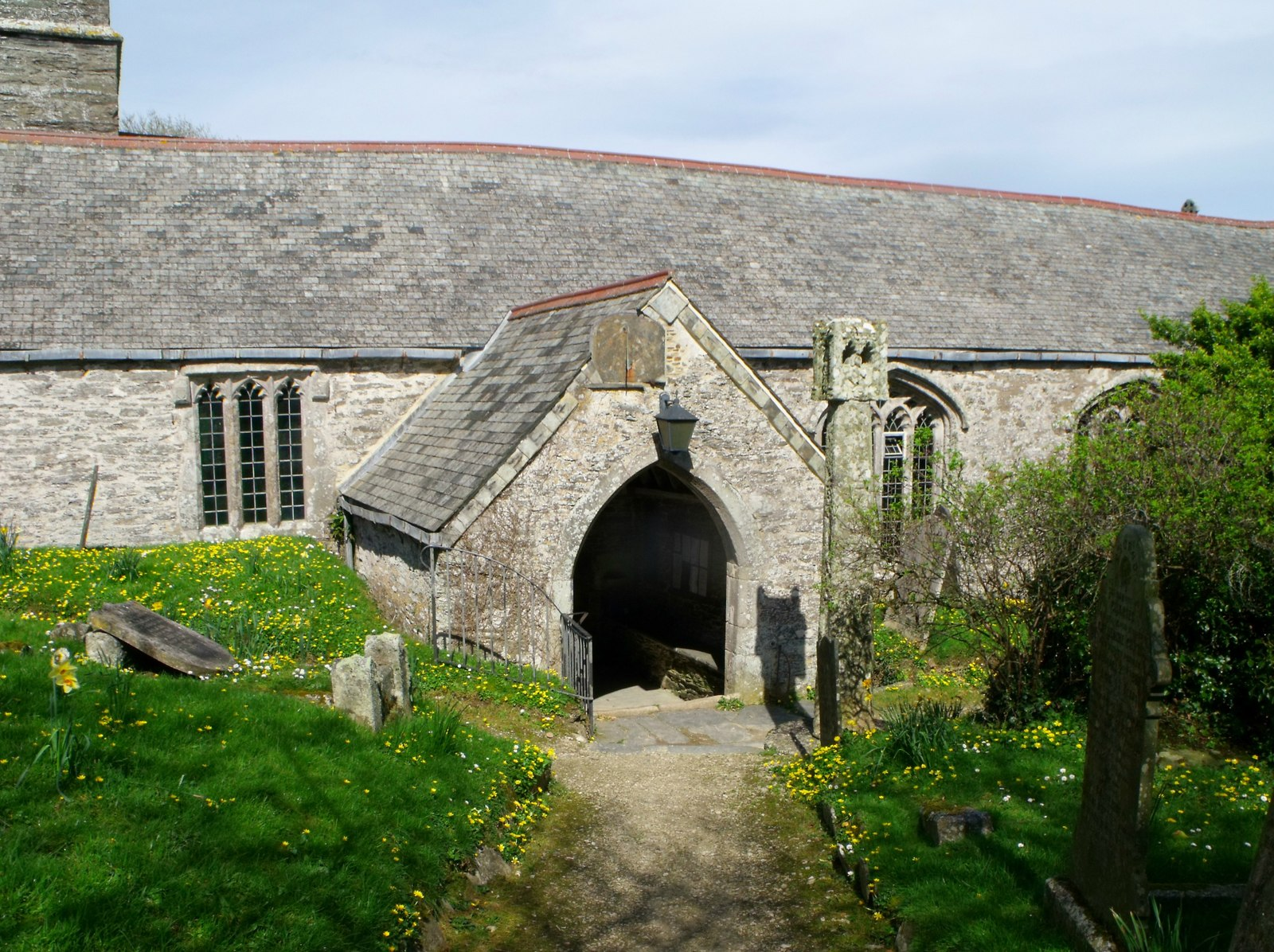
St Wyllow's Church (note the lantern cross near the porch)

The parish church, dedicated to St Wyllow, was built in the 14th century and renovated in the 15th. The 16th century benchends and panels from family pews have been preserved in the Victorian restoration by E. H. Sedding. The church contains the brasses of Thomas de Mohun (d.1400) and a monument to John Mohun (d. 1508) and his wife Anne Code (d. 1508), who both died within a day of each other of sweating sickness.

There are two stone crosses in the churchyard. One is a tall Gothic lantern cross which was found buried in a trench next to the church in 1838. It was erected in its present position in 1841. The other cross consists of a cross head found in Pont Pill Creek. When it was moved to the churchyard the corresponding shaft was found there and a few years later c. 1910 it was restored and re-erected.

In 1932 author Daphne du Maurier was married at Lanteglos-by-Fowey church.

== Historic estates ==
The historic estate of Hall, is the ancient seat of the Mohun family (a junior branch of Mohun of Dunster Castle in Somerset, feudal barons of Dunster), also seated at Boconnoc, which branch was one of the four co-heirs of Edward Courtenay, 1st Earl of Devon (1527–1556) the last of the mediaeval Courtenay Earls of Devon.

== Cornish wrestling ==
Cornish wrestling tournaments, for prizes, were held in Lanteglos in the 1700s.

The Vicar of Lanteglos-by-Fowey was described in 1586 as "the best wrastler in Cornwall."
