= Lanteglos =

Lanteglos may refer to:

- Lanteglos-by-Camelford, a hamlet and ecclesiastical parish in north Cornwall in the UK
- Lanteglos-by-Fowey, a civil parish in south-east Cornwall in the UK
