= Bodinnick =

Village in Cornwall, England

Coordinates: 50.3397°N 4.6299°W

Bodinnick: Cornish: Bosdinek
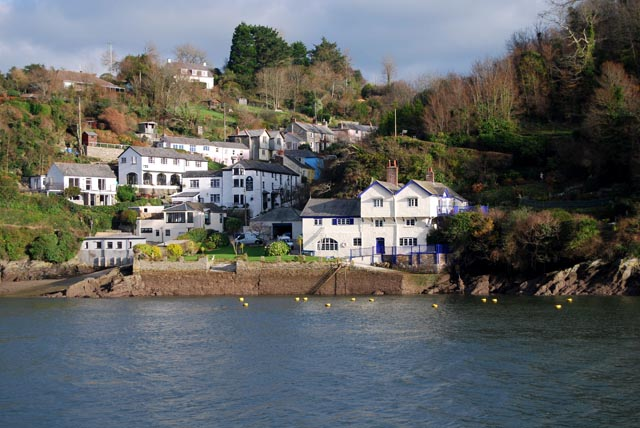
- Bodinnick from Fowey

- Location within Cornwall
- OS grid reference: SX130521
- Civil parish: Lanteglos-by-Fowey
- Unitary authority: Cornwall
- Ceremonial county: Cornwall
- Region: South West
- Country: England
- Sovereign state: United Kingdom
- Post town: FOWEY
- Postcode district: PL23
- Dialling code: 01726
- Police: Devon and Cornwall
- Fire: Cornwall
- Ambulance: South Western
- UK Parliament: South East Cornwall

Bodinnick (Cornish: Bosdinek, meaning fortified dwelling) is a riverside village in south-east Cornwall, in the United Kingdom. According to the Post Office the population of the 2011 Census was included in the civil parish of Lanteglos-by-Fowey. It is a fishing village situated on the east bank of the River Fowey opposite the town of Fowey, also on the banks of the Fowey River. The ferry crossing is from Fowey to Bodinnick and the "Old Ferry Inn" is located on its bank glorified as "in the heart of Du Maurier country". This ferry terminal is said to have existed since the 13th century.

There are also places called Bodinnick in the civil parishes of St Stephen-in-Brannel and St Tudy.

== Geography ==
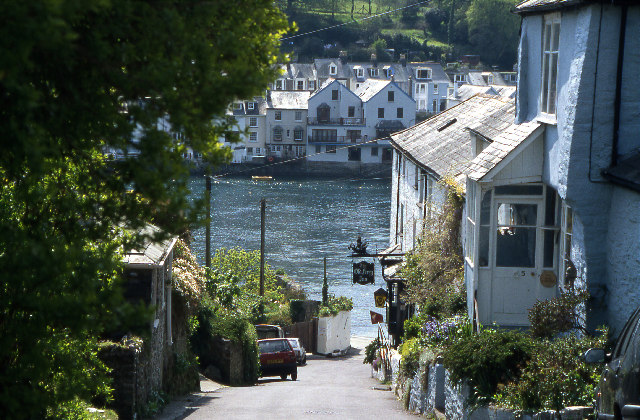
Bodinnick looking towards Fowey

Bodinnick lies in the Lanteglos-by-Fowey parish on the banks of the Fowey River. It was important as a ferry terminal for people travelling from Fowey. There is an "Old Ferry Inn" close to the bank of the river here. There is a camp site about 1 mile (1.6 km) from the ferry crossing. A 4 miles (6.4 km) walk from the ferry crossing at Bodinnick goes through a scenic route called the "Hall Walk" along the Polruan River. A ferry services from here also connects to Fowey. Hall Walk is along the cliff which is halfway up the Bodinnick hill which winds around the Pont Creek. A creek, which is about 0.3 miles (0.48 km) in length joins an estuary at Pelene Point near about 0.25 miles (0.40 km) from Bodinnick. At the head of this creek there is chapel dedicated to St. Wyllow. Two miles in land to the north up another creek, on its north bank, off Bodinnick, there is the "Cell of Black Monks" from Montacute dedicated to Sa Syricus and Juliette. Hermit St. Mancus's festival is held here. St. Wyllow was a contemporary of St. Mancus and Meubred and his tomb lies one mile away from Bodinnick, where a festival is also held in his honour. There was also a chapel dedicated to St John the Baptist here.

== History ==
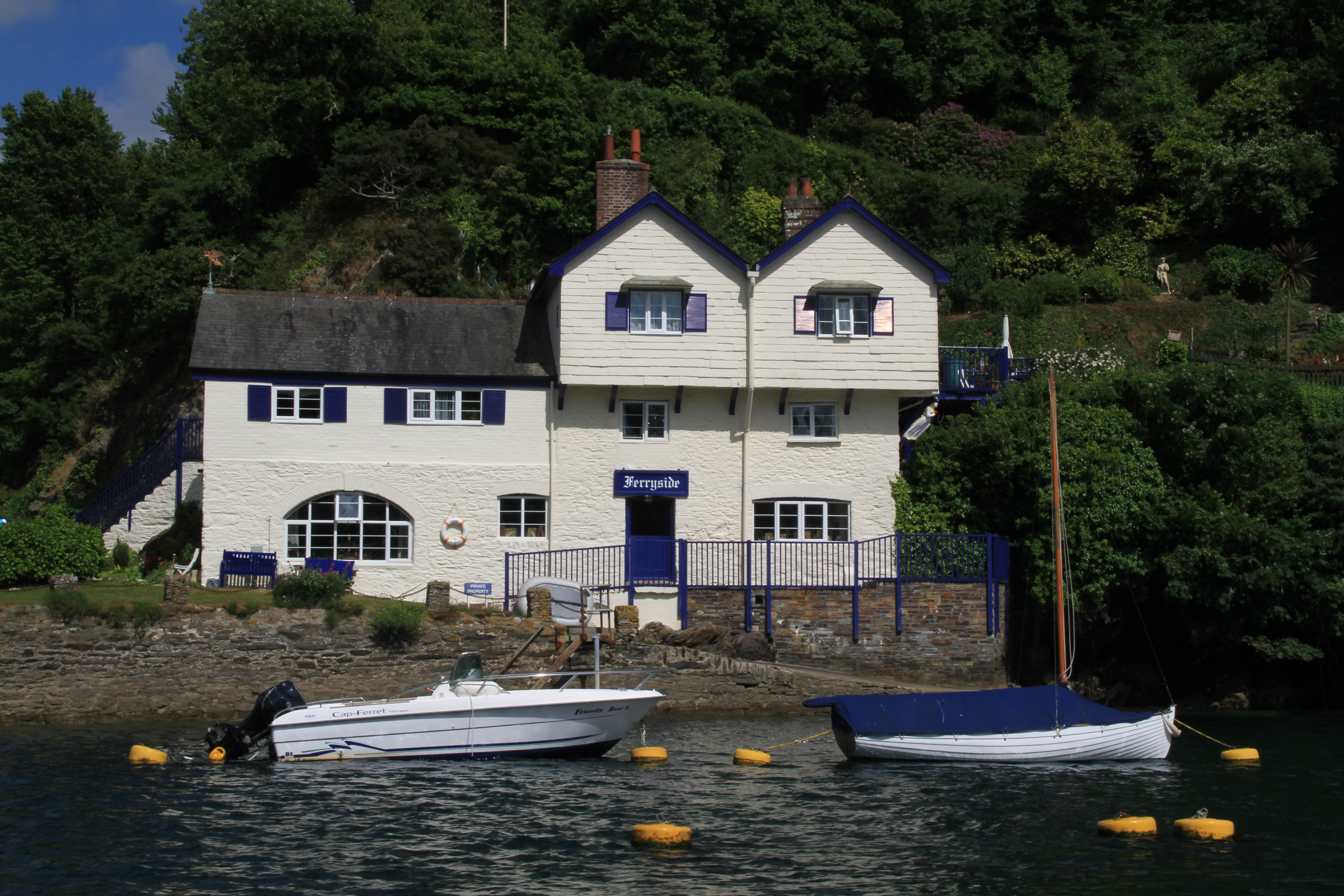
"Ferryside" where Daphne du Maurier's 1931 novel The Loving Spirit was written

In August 1644, the king visited Cornwall and an attempt was made on his life with a cannonball, it missed, but was reported to have killed a fisherman nearby. During the late 17th, 18th and 19th centuries, Bodinnick and the nearby villages of Fowey and Polruan were home to wealthy shipping merchants and master mariners. The well known families who lived at the time were the Slades, the Salts and the Tadds. These families, for several generations, were involved in trading and transporting local China clay or imported coal with their schooners through the local ferry harbours.

In the 1680s, John Gandy of Exeter supplied cloth to Philippa Randle of Bodinnick, sending consignments both by barge along the coast and across the fields by pack horse. A shoe maker was also known to live in the village in the 1830s.

Daphne du Maurier wrote many novels while living at "Ferryside" (a house that is stated to be still owned by her family) on the river bank at Bodinnick on the eastern shore, opposite to Fowey; she moved to Menabilly later after the publication of her 1938 novel Rebecca. It was also the home of her sister Angela du Maurier for most of her life.

== Vegetation ==
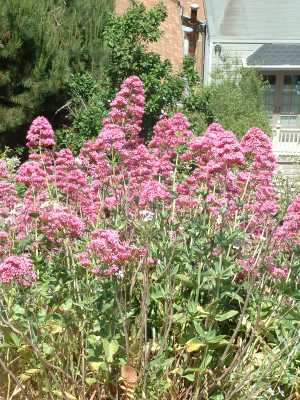
Centranthus ruber

Hypericum maculatum is seen along the roadside near the ferry crossing. A rare plant known as the Allium ursinum grows during spring as a part of hedges. Centranthus ruber plants are also seen on the old walls.

== Facilities ==
A ferry service operates between Fowey and Bodinnick and gives its name to The Old Ferry Inn, a 400-year-old building on the steep lane down to the riverside. A 4 miles (6.4 km) walk along the hill tops connects Bodinnick to Polruan in the south.

In Bodinnick Hall Place is a Methodist chapel now in use as a shippen. Features of interest are the north doorway and a western bell turret.
