= Wyllow =

Cornish hermit saint and martyr

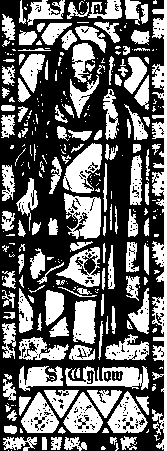
St Wyllow window in St Olaf's Church, Poughill (1914)

Wyllow was a Cornish hermit saint and martyr whose existence was reported by William Worcester.

He was said to have been born in Ireland but worked in Cornwall.

He was reputedly beheaded by Melyn ys Kynrede ("Melyn's kinfolk") in the parish of Lanteglos, near Fowey. Supposedly, he then carried his head for half a mile to St Willow's Bridge, where a church was later built in his honour. Nicholas Roscarrock gives his feast day as 3 June. He is still commemorated in Cornwall, with the 15th century Church of St Wyllow, Lanteglos-by-Fowey. built by Thomas Mohun.

He is also known as Vylloc and his dates of birth and death are unknown, though it is likely that he lived in the 6th century. St. Willow is regarded as the patron of Lanteglos.

== See also ==
- Mybbard and Mancus
