= Fowey Town Hall =

Municipal building in Fowey, Cornwall, England

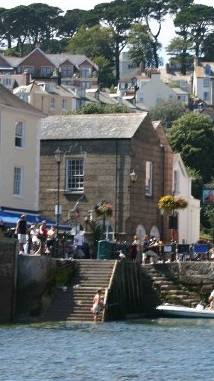
- Fowey Town Hall on the Town Quay

- Shown in Cornwall
- 50.3351°N 4.6346°W
- Location: Town Quay, Fowey, Cornwall, England

History
- Built: 1787

Site notes
- Architectural style: Neoclassical style

Listed Building – Grade II
- Official name: The Town Hall
- Designated: 13 March 1951
- Reference no.: 1290368

Fowey Town Hall is a municipal building on the Town Quay in Fowey, Cornwall, England. The structure, which serves as meeting place of Fowey Town Council, is a Grade II listed building.

== History ==
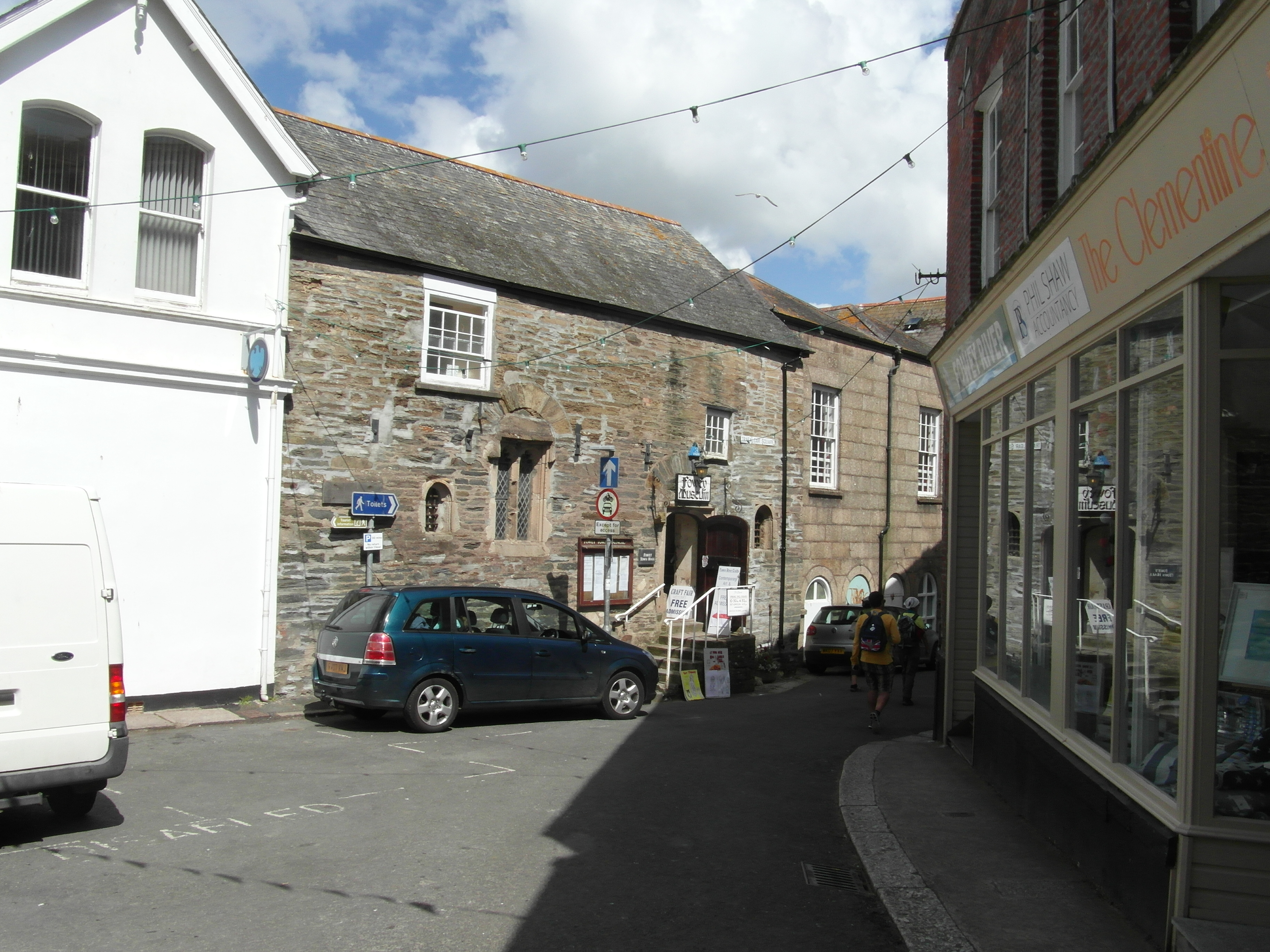
The medieval town hall, now occupied by the Fowey Museum

The site currently occupied by the town hall complex was originally inhabited by a 14th-century guild chapel. The first municipal building on the site was a medieval single-storey merchant's house built in rubble masonry and completed in the 15th century. It was converted into a town hall, with a lock-up on the ground floor and an assembly room on the first floor, in the 17th century. In the 1780s, two local members of parliament, Viscount Valletort and Philip Rashleigh, offered to commission a more substantial town hall for the borough. The site they selected was to the immediate east of the medieval town hall, which then became the mayor's chambers.

The new building was designed in the neoclassical style, built in granite ashlar and was completed in 1787. The design involved a symmetrical main frontage of seven bays facing onto the Town Quay. There were seven round headed openings with voussoirs on the ground floor and three sash windows on the first floor. Internally, the principal rooms were a market hall, for the sale of meat and fish, on the ground floor, and an assembly room, which featured a king post roof structure, on the first floor.

The borough council, which had met in the council chamber, ceased to function in 1826. Fowey had a very small electorate and two dominant patrons, William Rashleigh and Richard Edgcumbe, 2nd Earl of Mount Edgcumbe, which meant it was recognised by the UK Parliament as a rotten borough. Its right to elect members of parliament was removed by the Reform Act 1832. Following the implementation of the Municipal Corporations Act 1835, the corporation's assets, including the town hall, were transferred to the ownership of the lord of the manor, Joseph Thomas Austen (his surname changed to Treffry in 1838).

Following the intervention of the future Lord Mayor of London, Sir Charles Hanson, who submitted a petition drawn up by the writer, Sir Arthur Quiller-Couch, Fowey became a municipal borough again in 1913. The then lord of the manor, Charles Ebenezer Treffry, gave the town hall back to new borough council at that time. He also allowed the medieval town hall to be used as accommodation for the Fowey Museum. Exhibits accessioned to the collection included a cloak worn by General Giuseppe Garibaldi, who unified Italy in the early 1860s and then arrived in Fowey in 1864: Garibaldi was visiting John Whitehead Peard who had accompanied Garibaldi on his campaigns and then retired to Fowey. Exhibits also included Hanson's badge of office in his capacity as Sheriff of the City of London.

A small aquarium, intended to display a variety of local fish and marine creatures, was established on the ground floor of the town hall in 1952. The building continued to serve as the meeting place of the borough council for much of the 20th century, but ceased to be the local seat of government when the enlarged St Austell with Fowey Borough Council was formed in 1968. Following local government reorganisation in 1974, the town hall became the meeting place of Fowey Town Council. Since then, the town hall has continued to serve as a community events venue.
