= Charles Fitzgeoffrey =

English poet and clergyman (1576–1638)

Charles Fitzgeoffrey (1576–1638) was an Elizabethan poet and clergyman.

== Early life and education ==
Fitzgeoffrey was born in Cornwall, the son of a clergyman, Alexander Fitzgeoffrey (a surname sometimes spelled Fitzgeffrey), Rector of the Church of St Fimbarrus, Fowey. His father died during Charles's childhood, perhaps while he was around eight years old, and his mother then married into the distinguished Mohun family, which gave her son financial and social security. After early schooling under the Rev. Richard Harvey, at seventeen Fitzgeoffrey went up to Oxford University, matriculating at Broadgates Hall on 3 July 1593.

Fitzgeoffrey was admitted B.A. in 1597 and M.A. in 1600, but had apparently left Oxford by 1599. It is not immediately clear where he went or what he did, though verses in Affaniae make reference to a time spent in Wiltshire, where he had relatives named Bellott; and also to a severe illness which he suffered about this period. Elsewhere in his verse Fitzgeoffrey also alludes to a disability: he had the sight of only one eye.

== Writings ==
Fitzgeoffrey was only twenty and still at Oxford when he produced Sir Francis Drake, His Honorable life's commendation, and his Tragical Deathes Lamentation,(1596) which was popular enough to go through a second printing. Fitzgeoffrey is mentioned by Francis Meres in his 1598 survey of contemporary English literature, Palladis Tamia, where he is admiringly described as "that high touring Falcon" for the epic quality of his verse and his patriotic choice of subject. Drake extolled the exploits of Fitzgeoffrey's fellow West Countryman, the recently deceased sailor Sir Francis Drake, and other English seafaring heroes.

Of more interest to later literary historians are the kind of chatty Latin epigrams at which Fitzgeoffrey excelled, and which he eventually collected and published as Affaniae. Affaniae is a non-classical Latin word meaning "trivial, trashy talk", and the epigrams in Fitzgeoffrey's book, generally light in tone, refer to a wide range of his neighbours in Cornwall, friends in Oxford and contemporary writers whose work he admired. It is this abundance of references to Elizabethan writers which chiefly makes his work interesting today. Significant authors he namechecks include Thomas Nashe, Ben Jonson, Michael Drayton, Edmund Spenser, Sir Philip Sidney, George Chapman, William Camden, Barnabe Barnes, John Marston, Joseph Hall and Mary Sidney. Other epigrams suggest the young Fitzgeoffrey was as interested in the work of Continental humanist authors as he was in native English writers.

He also includes epitaphs on contemporaries, and his verse on the satirist Thomas Nashe illustrates why Fitzgeoffrey is so valued as a source of literary and cultural history. His poem is the first contemporary reference to the death of Nashe, which was otherwise unrecorded: it indicates Nashe's work had been officially banned from publication at the time he died: and it gives an insight into how the author was viewed by his contemporaries, saluting both his irrepressible verve and combative nature.

== Later life ==
Shortly after leaving university Fitzgeoffrey must have taken holy orders, because in 1603 the father of one of his Oxford friends presented him with the living of St Dominick's at Halton, Cornwall. Financially secure and living close to the homes of good friends who shared his cultural interests, Fitzgeoffrey settled down. He must also have married, though his wife's name has not survived, as two years before his death the living was presented to his eldest son John. Later in life Fitzgeoffrey published some of his sermons and also produced a final book of English poetry on the subject of Christ's nativity, The Blessed Birth-Day. A letter of his describing a violent storm which hit Fowey, damaging the church tower, also survives. Conventionally for the period Fitzgeoffrey interprets the storm providentially as a "warning piece from Heaven", but was somewhat troubled to find the only person injured in it was a maidservant who, he is at pains to point out, he has known "for this seven years... to be of sober, modest, religious conversation".

Charles Fitzgeoffrey died on 24 February 1638 and was buried under the communion table of his church.
