= Church of St Fimbarrus, Fowey =

Anglican parish church in Cornwall, England

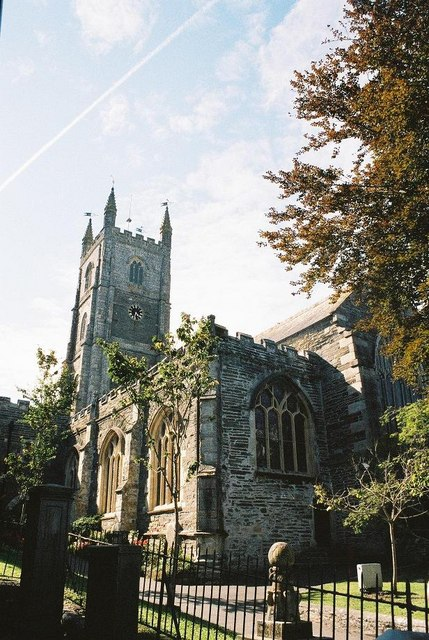

- Location within Cornwall
- 50.33536°N 4.63569°W
- Location: Fowey, Cornwall, England

Listed Building – Grade I
- Official name: Church of St Fimbarrus or St Nicholas
- Designated: 13 March 1951
- Reference no.: 1327314

Listed Building – Grade II
- Official name: Church yard gateway to east of Church of St Fimbarrus
- Designated: 11 March 1974
- Reference no.: 1144301

Listed Building – Grade II
- Official name: Remains of pinnacle in churchyard about 20 yards to south east of Church of St Fimbarrus
- Designated: 11 March 1974
- Reference no.: 1218866

The Church of St Fimbarrus is an Anglican parish church in Fowey, Cornwall, England. Also known as Fowey Parish Church, it is in the Church of England's Diocese of Truro. The church is a grade I listed building and dates from the 14th century.

== History ==
The church is dedicated to Saint Finbarr and is listed Grade I. It was built in the early 14th century and rededicated in 1336, replacing a previous Norman church. The church was damaged by the French in 1457, and repaired in 1460 by the Earl of Warwick, when the clerestory and the north and south aisles were rebuilt. There is a nave and two aisles with a clerestory, and the aisles are unusually wide; the aisles and the clerestory may be additions of the 15th century. The tower, of the 16th century, is of four stages and has buttresses and bands of ornament. There is an exceptionally fine 15th-century carved wagon roof. The south porch has open arches to the west and east and an eight-ribbed vaulted roof. The font is Norman, of Catacleuze stone, and similar to those of Ladock, Feock and St Mewan. The hexagonal pulpit was made in 1601. The monuments include two brasses of the mid 15th century and those of John Rashleigh, 1582, and Alice Rashleigh, 1602. The most interesting are two later Rashleigh monuments: John Rashleigh, c. 1610, and another of 1683. The church was used as a town hall for a period up to 1684.

In 1899, Kenneth Grahame, author of The Wind in the Willows, married Elspeth Thompson at the church. Sir Arthur Quiller-Couch (1863–1944) is buried in the churchyard.

=== Present day ===
Fowey Parish Church is an evangelical Anglican church. It had passed a resolution to reject the leadership of women in church. In 2019, its vicar and half the congregation left to form an explicitly conservative evangelical church in the town outside of the Church of England but under the auspices of GAFCON.

In May 2023, the chair of the Parochial Church Council (PCC) stepped down, along with two other members; they had supported the resolution against a female vicar. In July 2023, with a new PCC elected, the council voted unanimously to rescind the resolution and to open the job opening to both men and women. It had been one of 150 parishes in the Church of England that rejected the leadership of women in church (including as vicars or bishops).

In March 2024, the church welcomed a woman, the Reverend Carol Edleston, as "Priest for Fowey".

== Organ ==
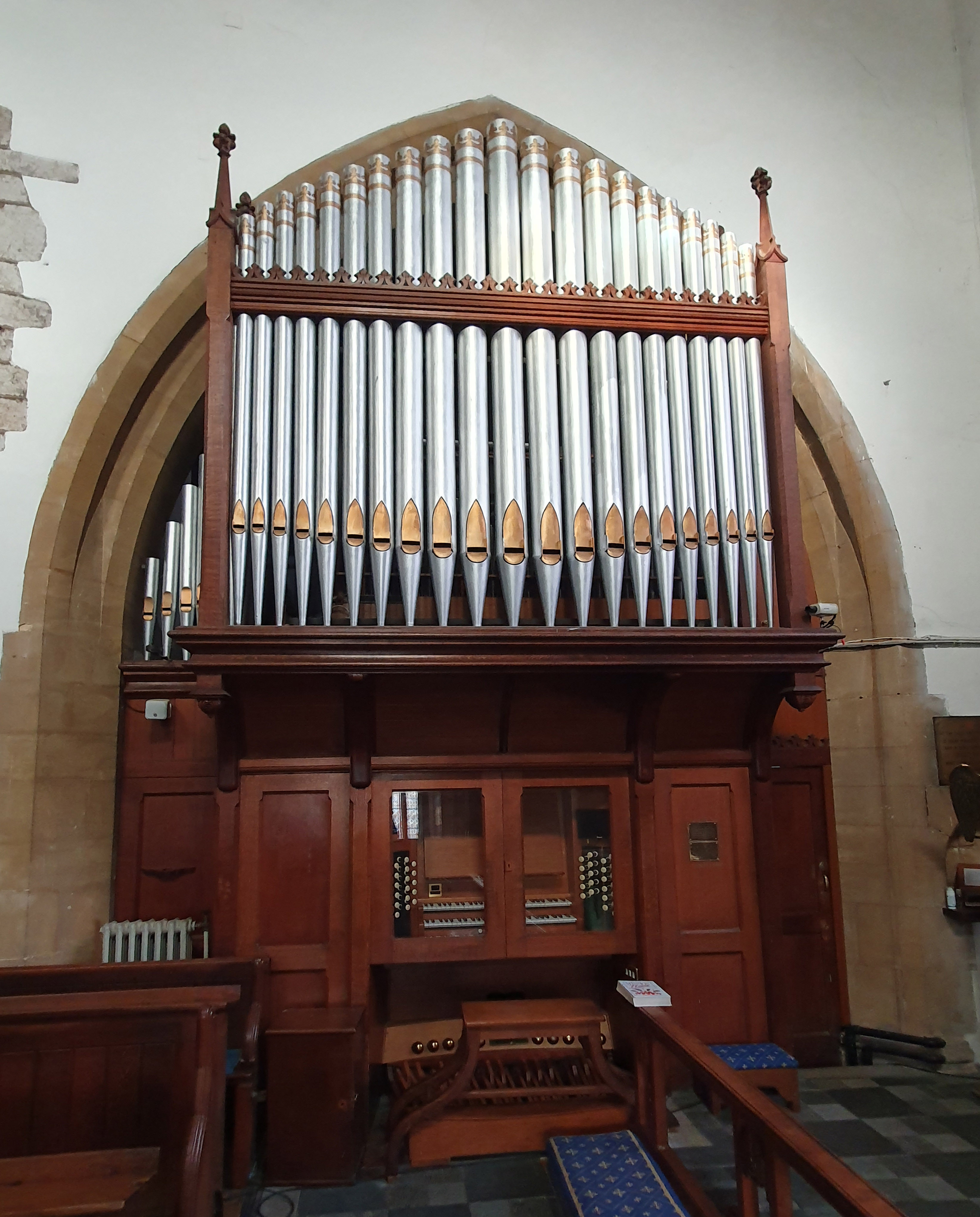
The organ in 2024

A new organ was obtained in 1855 which included provision for German Pedals. This was replaced by a new organ installed in 1877 built by Grover and Grover of London. The pipe organ has been renovated and rebuilt on several occasions.

In 1892 Hele and Co of Plymouth undertook some work on the 2 manual instrument which was followed by an enlargement in 1905 by Wadsworth to 3 manuals.Subsequent work has been undertaken by Hele & Co in 1948 and 1972, and Lance Foy in 2001 and 2006 which has created an instrument with 3 manuals and pedal with 33 speaking stops.

A specification of the organ can be found on the National Pipe Organ Register

=== Organists ===
- William Betty 1854 - 1866 (formerly organist at Holy Trinity Church, St Austell)
- George Henry Bate 1866 - 1891
- Stribley Lacey 1891 - 1895
- Charles Edward Juleff 1895 - 1897 (formerly organist at St Michael and All Angels’ Church, Exeter, and St Petroc's Church, Bodmin, afterwards organist of St John the Evangelist, Taunton)
- Thomas J. Baker 1898 - 1901 (formerly organist of St Nicolas Church, Guildford)
- William Benjamin Seller Hawkins 1901 - 1913
- Miss E. Broad 1914
- R. Lacey 1915 - 1920
- Charles K. Jago 1920 - 1956
- Norman Williams 1957 - 1973

== Bells ==
The church contains a ring of 8 bells with the tenor weight of 876 kg.

== Gallery ==
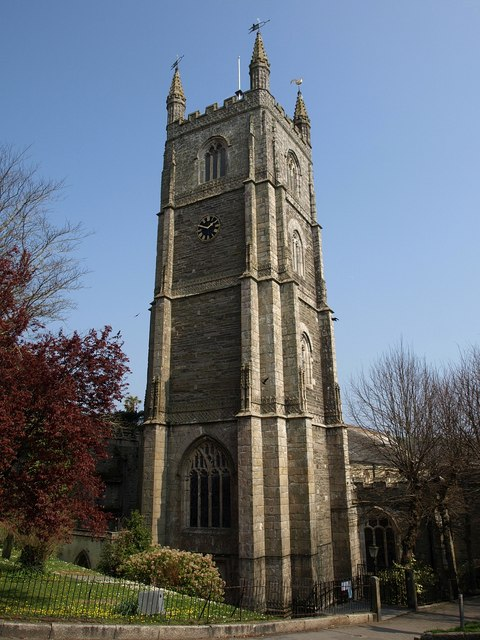
Church tower

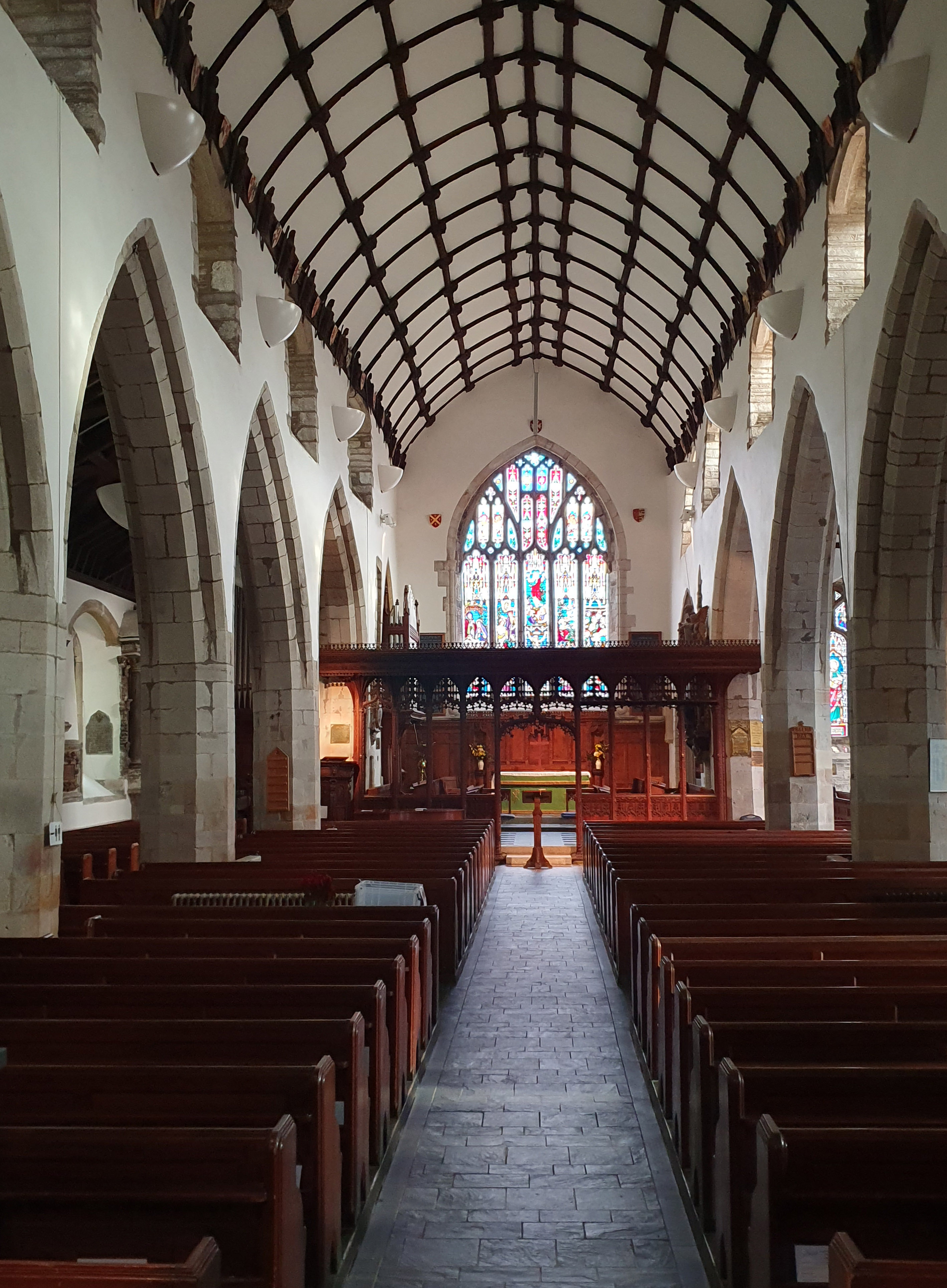
Nave

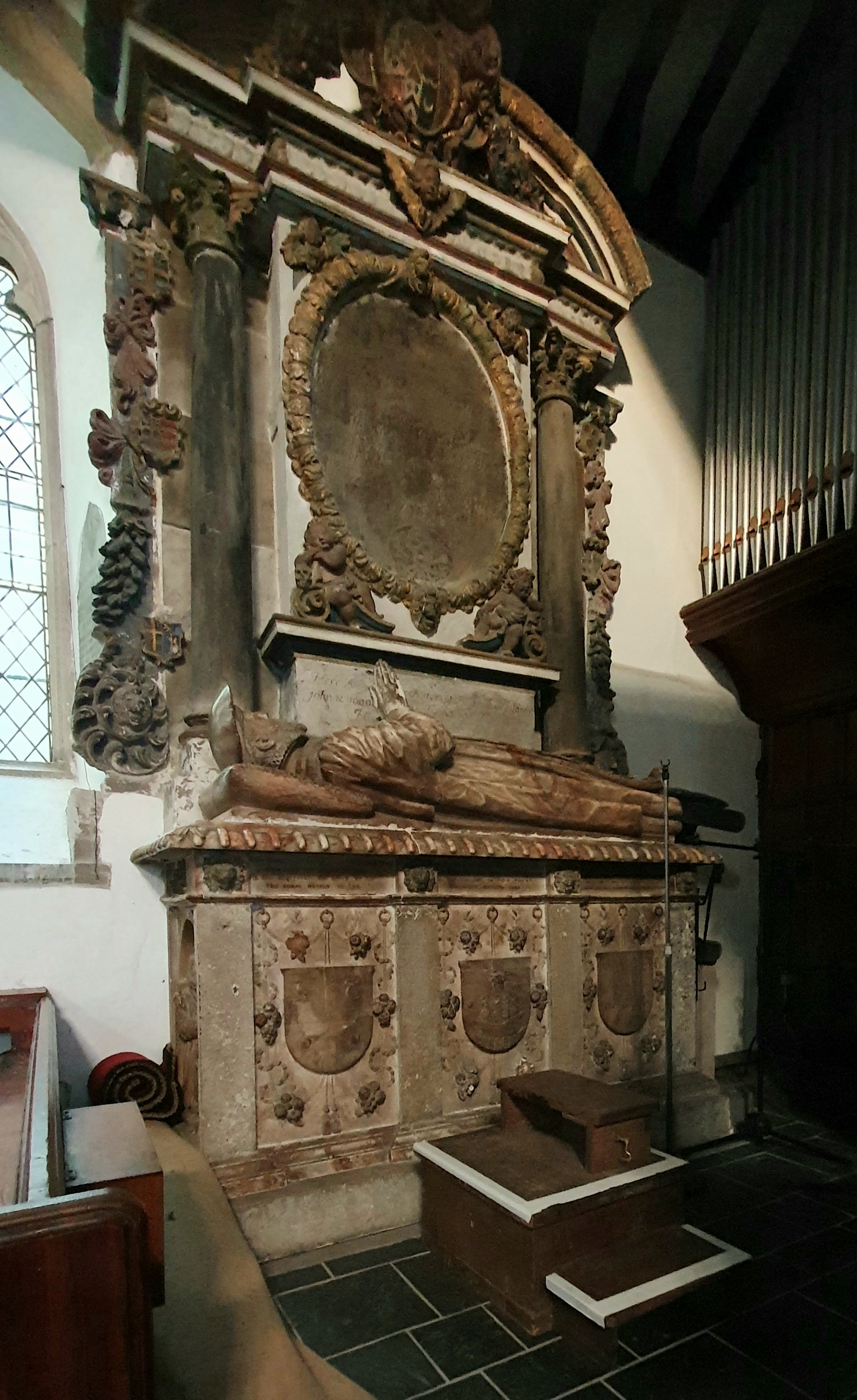
Monument
