= Polruan =

Village in Cornwall, England

Coordinates: 50.3273°N 4.6333°W

Polruan: Cornish: Porthruwon
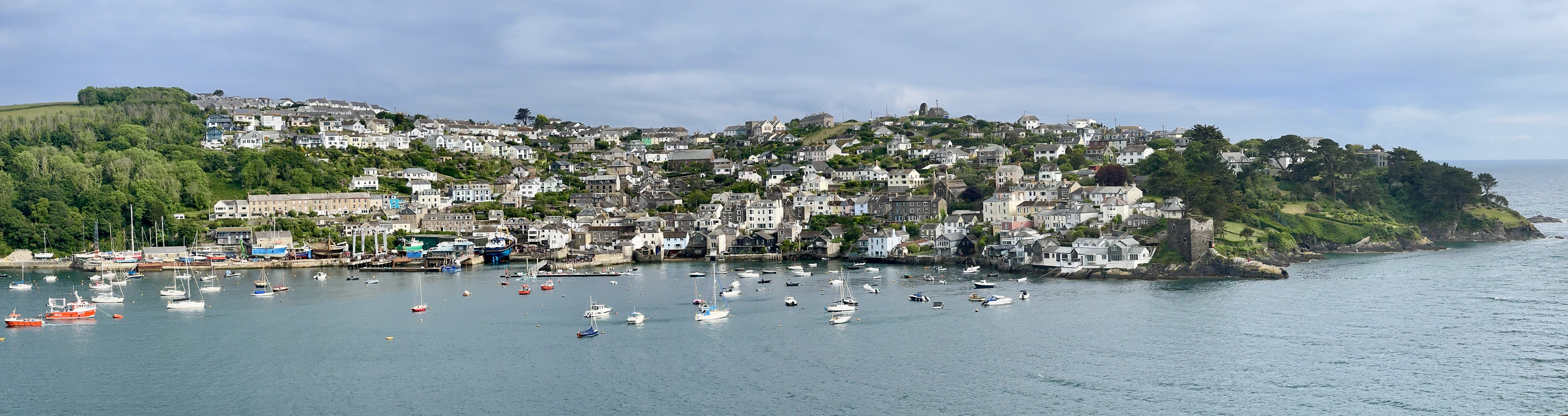
- Polruan viewed across the river from Fowey

- Location within Cornwall
- OS grid reference: SX126508
- Civil parish: Lanteglos-by-Fowey
- Unitary authority: Cornwall
- Ceremonial county: Cornwall
- Region: South West
- Country: England
- Sovereign state: United Kingdom
- Post town: FOWEY
- Postcode district: PL23
- Dialling code: 01726
- Police: Devon and Cornwall
- Fire: Cornwall
- Ambulance: South Western
- UK Parliament: South East Cornwall

Polruan (Cornish: Porthruwon) is a coastal village in the parish of Lanteglos-by-Fowey in Cornwall, England, United Kingdom. It is bounded on three sides by water: to the north by Pont Creek, to the west by the River Fowey and to the south by the English Channel and neighbouring village Bodinnick to the north, connected by a 4-mile walk along the hill tops. Polruan is very steep and well protected from the prevailing winds and Polruan Pool is a haven for small boats.

The population of Polruan was 534 in the 2021 census.

== History ==
Polruan has never been a centre for fishing, although it is often mistakenly called a fishing village. In the 1851 census there were just four men giving their occupations as fishermen, the majority were linked to shipbuilding or were mariners. In the medieval period Polruan produced some very large ships, employed in the wine trade with Bordeaux. In 1343 five Polruan ships were in the King's service. A century later the Edward of Polruan was accused of piracy and its size can be shown by the number of men it carried, 200 men 'armed and arrayed for war.'

St Ruan was the first to occupy the top of Polruan Hill the point where St Saviour's ruin still stands today. The ruin of St Saviour's church on the hill above Polruan dates to the 8th century. It was a landmark for shipping, and also, in times of war, a vantage point for observing the approach of enemy shipping to the strategically important Fowey harbour. The name Polruan derives from the Cornish for harbour of a man called Ruveun.

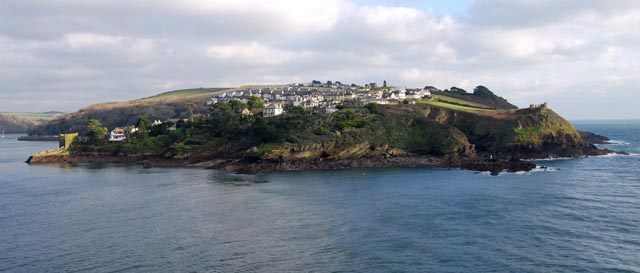
Polruan from Fowey

Polruan also has a blockhouse fortification built in the 14th century that guards the entrance to the river Fowey, one of a pair—its partner being situated on the Fowey side of the river. The Polruan blockhouse is well preserved due to the efforts of various enthusiastic councillors and conservationists on the Polruan side of the river, in contrast to the blockhouse in Fowey. Between the two blockhouses was strung a defensive chain to prevent enemy ships entering the harbour, the chain being lowered for friendly vessels. This was primarily used during the wars with the Dutch.

The Harbour Commissioners Yard at Brazen Island was a shipbuilding yard in the 19th century, one of several in Polruan building schooners, barquentines and ketches. Polruan was the major shipbuilding site in the harbour and the owners and the families of the mariners lived in the village. As wooden shipbuilding declined in late 19th century, Brazen Island became a sardine processing factory which also supplied electricity for the village. The gun battery at Peak Point held an anti-shipping gun of which the mounting pin can still be seen. The battery gave the name of Battery Park. The wall at Peak Field was used for rifle practice. Motor torpedo boats were repaired at Pont Creek during World War II. The overhanging trees hid the boats from surveillance aircraft. The remains of cradles for boat repair and some hull parts can still be seen preserved in the mud on the foreshore.

A cross known as Polruan or St Saviour's Cross stands at the top of Fore Street. The latter name comes from the former chapel of St Saviour nearby.

== Education ==
The main school serving the village is Polruan Primary Academy which is a mixed school of non-denominational religion. The primary school (which only has 25 pupils at most) was formerly the village girls' school, the boys' school being destroyed in the Second World War after a German bomber shed its unused payload. The site of the boys' school is now where the car park is at the top of St Saviours Hill.

The nearest secondary school, Fowey River Academy, is in Fowey.

== Transport ==
Polruan can be accessed in a number of ways. By car using the linking one road in and one road out, which is the usual way. There is a taxi service operating in the village which transports residents in and out of the village. The local bus service operates on different times during season, the service is run via Looe, Polperro, Lansallos and Greenbank.

Other transport includes the Polruan ferry, which crosses the river to and from Fowey every 15 minutes and operates every day of the year. There is also a passenger ferry to Mevagissey. Cars can be ferried to Fowey from Bodinnick which is 4 miles away. When the car ferry from Bodinnick is not running, Fowey and points westwards are reached by car via a car journey via Lostwithiel.

== Sport ==
The history of the Troy class of boat has been set down by Marcus Lewis. Lewis also builds boats and has a small history of the Fowey River class of boat.

== Maritime links ==
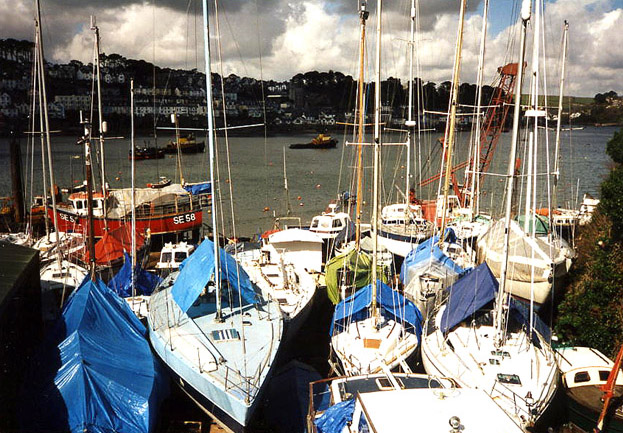
Boats at Polruan

The long legacy of shipbuilding continues today with Toms yard. Until recently the Fowey Harbour Pilots traditionally came from Polruan. Pilotage for commercial shipping was carried out from open boats with the Pilots boarding the ships via a pilot ladder. The Fowey Pilots Association describes the work of the pilots.

Polruan is one of a now increasing number of Cornish places to use lookouts to help marine craft in distress. Many lookout towers were demolished in the 1980s to save costs. Now, through the National Coastwatch Institution (NCI), a voluntary charity, many of the surviving old coastguard lookouts and towers are being re-staffed by qualified volunteers. The Old Coastguard Lookout at Polruan was among the first to be re-commissioned in this way. (The current His Majesty's Coastguard headquarters for cliff rescue, including the equipment store, is on St Saviour's Hill adjacent to the NCI Station, above the main village carpark. Exercises of the HM Coastguard continue.) The current Polruan NCI Station overlooks the Fowey estuary and also St Austell Bay beyond the village. It was constructed in the nineteenth century.

== People ==
Calvin Dean, the actor from the film Tormented, grew up in Polruan. Daphne du Maurier once stayed in the village and based her first novel, The Loving Spirit, on the Slade family of shipbuilders and mariners. Peter Skellern, the singer was resident in the village. Actor Patrick Malahide, who amongst other roles, played Inspector Chisholm in the popular television series Minder is also another Polruan resident. The illustrator Mabel Lucie Attwell lived in the village, as did the absurdist English playwright Norman F. Simpson. Raynor Winn, the author of The Salt Path, used to live in Polruan, which is the mid- and end-point of the 630-mile walk described in the book. The painter Annie Walke once had a studio in Polruan.

== Film and television ==
The film Stolen Hours featuring Susan Hayward was filmed around Polruan. The latter part of the film follows an actress who comes to Polruan to live out the remainder of her life, following a brain tumour, with her surgeon husband. The 1963 film displays older shots of the village including use of the village shop, "Headland House", and the clip of the children's sports day which is filmed where Greenbank is now built. A local woman, Mrs Baker, was included in the filming of the egg and spoon race and calls... "Let's get shoes off!"

An episode of The Inspector Lynley Mysteries was also partly filmed in Polruan.
