= Pont Pill =

River in Cornwall, England

Coordinates: 50.334°N 4.624°W

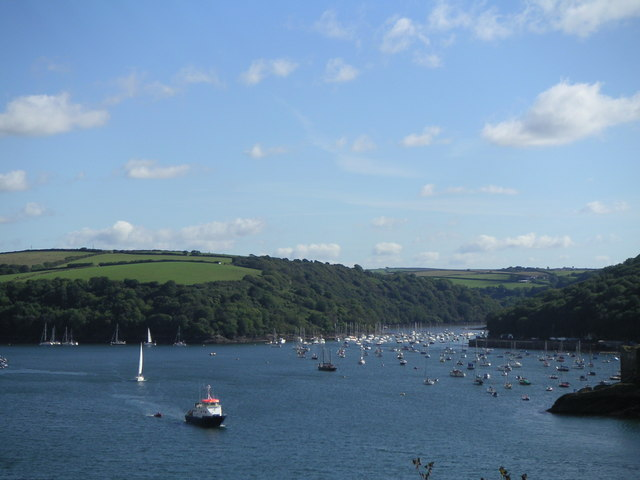
Penleath Point and Fowey Harbour, with Pont Pill upper right

Pont Pill (Cornish: Pyll Por' Reun, meaning creek of seal cove) is a tidal river in Cornwall, England. It joins the River Fowey at Penleath Point just below the memorial to Sir Arthur Quiller-Couch at the north-east corner of Fowey harbour. Pont Pill is only navigable at high tide.

Unspoiled by development, Pont Pill is popular with bird watchers, walkers, sailors and sport fishermen. The best way to see Pont Pill is by small boat at high water when it is possible to reach the bridge a mile-and-a-half upriver at Pont (Old Cornish: Pont Pyll, meaning bridge of the creek) the end of the navigable water. Walkers can see Pont Pill from hills that surround the river by following the Hall Walk between Bodinnick and Polruan.

== Literary associations ==
Pont Pill is thought by many local people to be part of the inspiration for Mole, Ratty, Toad and Badger's adventures in The Wind in the Willows because author Kenneth Grahame holidayed in nearby Lerryn. Grahame's time spent near the river may have inspired the bedtime stories he told to his son, and later developed into the famous children's book.

Leo Walmsley wrote several novels while living in a hut by the creek. It is the setting for his autobiographical novel Love in the Sun.
