= River Fowey =

River in Cornwall, England

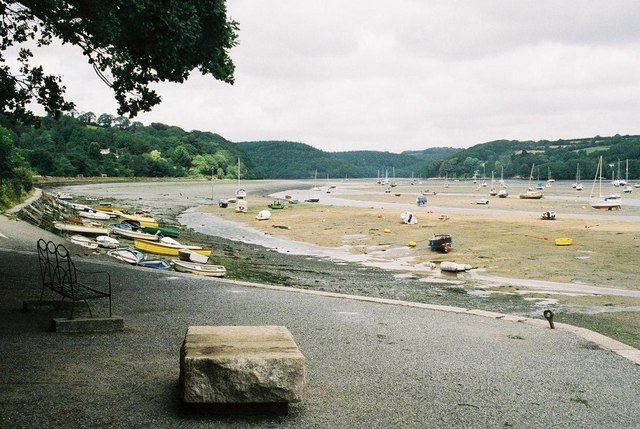
- River Fowey at Golant

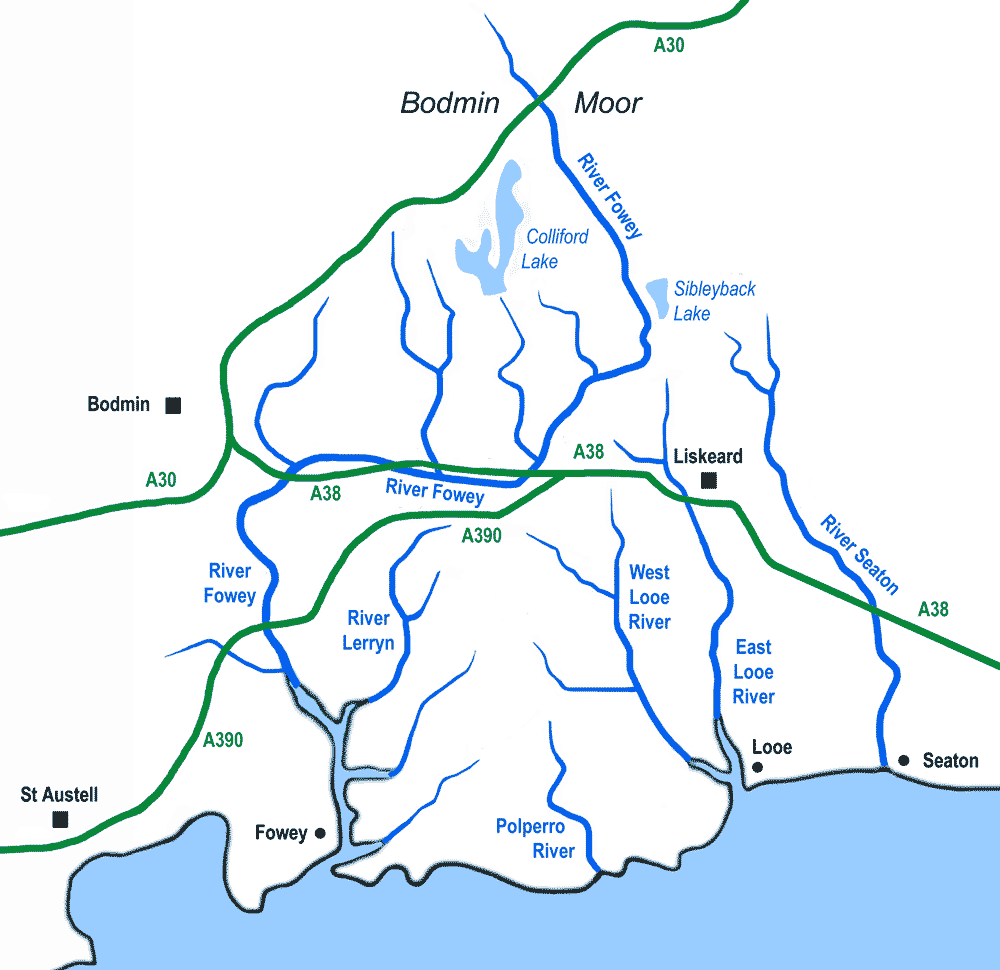
- The course of the River Fowey and neighbouring rivers in Cornwall

Physical characteristics
- Source
  - location: Bodmin Moor
  - elevation: 298 m (978 ft)
- Mouth
  - location: Fowey estuary
  - coordinates: 50°19′40″N 4°38′30″W
- Length: 40 km (25 mi)
- Discharge
  - average: 4.78 m^{3}/s (169 cu ft/s)

The River Fowey (/ˈfɔɪ/ FOY; Standard Written Form: Fowi) is a river in Cornwall, England, United Kingdom. Its source is at Fowey Well (originally Cornish: Fenten Fowi, meaning spring of the river Fowey) about 1 mile (1.6 km) north-west of Brown Willy on Bodmin Moor, not far from one of its tributaries rising at Dozmary Pool and Colliford Lake. The Fowey River passes Lanhydrock House, Restormel Castle and Lostwithiel, then broadens below Milltown before joining the English Channel at Fowey. The estuary is called Uzell (Cornish: Usel, meaning howling place). It is only navigable by larger craft for the last 7 miles (11 km). From Fowey, there is a passenger ferry to Polruan and a car ferry to Bodinnick. The first road crossing going upstream is in Lostwithiel. The river has seven tributaries, the largest being the River Lerryn. The section of the Fowey Valley between Doublebois and Bodmin Parkway railway station is known as the Glynn Valley (Cornish: Glyn, meaning deep wooded valley). The valley is the route of both the A38 trunk road and the railway line (built by the Cornwall Railway in 1859). The railway line is carried on eight stone viaducts along this stretch.

== History ==
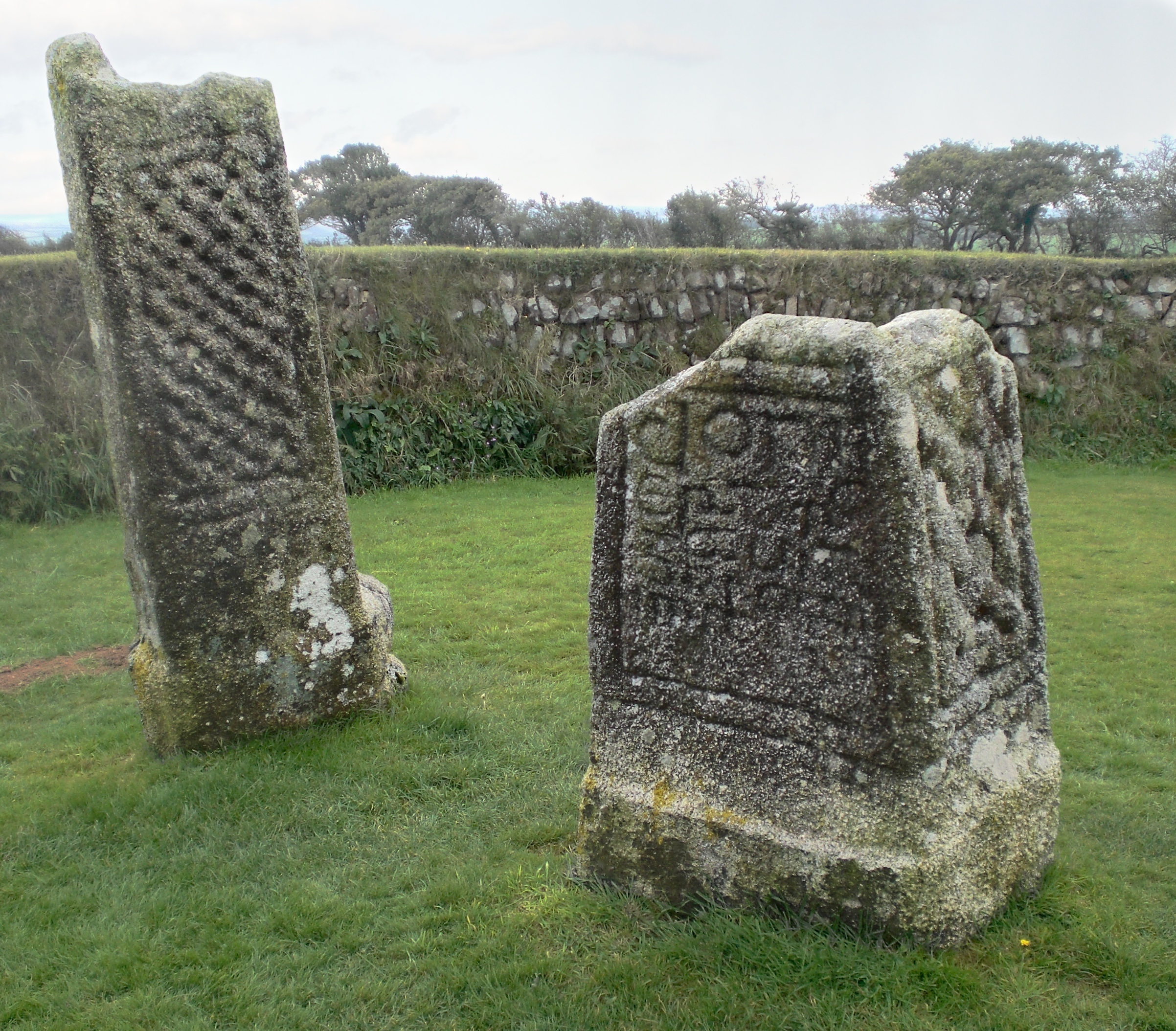
King Doniert's Stone (2007)

Donyarth (Latin: Doniert), or Dungarth (died 875) was the last-recorded king of Cornwall. He is thought to be the 'Doniert' recorded on an inscription on King Doniert's Stone, a ninth-century cross shaft which stands in St Cleer parish in Cornwall, although he is not given any title in the inscription. According to the Annales Cambriae, he drowned in 875. His death may have been an accident, but it was recorded in Ireland as a punishment for collaboration with the Vikings, who were harrying the West Saxons and briefly occupied Exeter in 876 before being driven out by Alfred the Great. Philip Payton states that one must imagine that he drowned in the River Fowey, near King Doniert's Stone.

The Polbrock Canal, approved by Parliament in the 1790s but never built, would have provided a link between the north and south coasts of Cornwall by joining the River Camel with the Fowey at Bodmin.

== Geology and hydrology ==
The upper reaches of the Fowey are mainly moorland giving way to woodland and farmland, predominantly livestock. This means that 63.6% of the catchment is grassland, with a further 18.3% woodland and 10.7% arable land. Of the remaining 7.5%, 2.6% is urban or built-up areas, 2.5% is mountain, heath and bog and the remainder is inland waters.

The catchment area of the River Fowey covers a total of 41,800 acres (65.3 mi^{2}) consisting of granite (in part kaolinised) on Bodmin Moor, Devonian slates and grits, and peat and valley gravels. Data collected by the National River Flow Archive shows that the average flow at the Restormel monitoring station is 4.78 m^{3}/s (169 cu ft/s) and is affected by the reservoirs at Colliford and Sibleyback and by abstraction of water for public supply.

== Wildlife and conservation ==
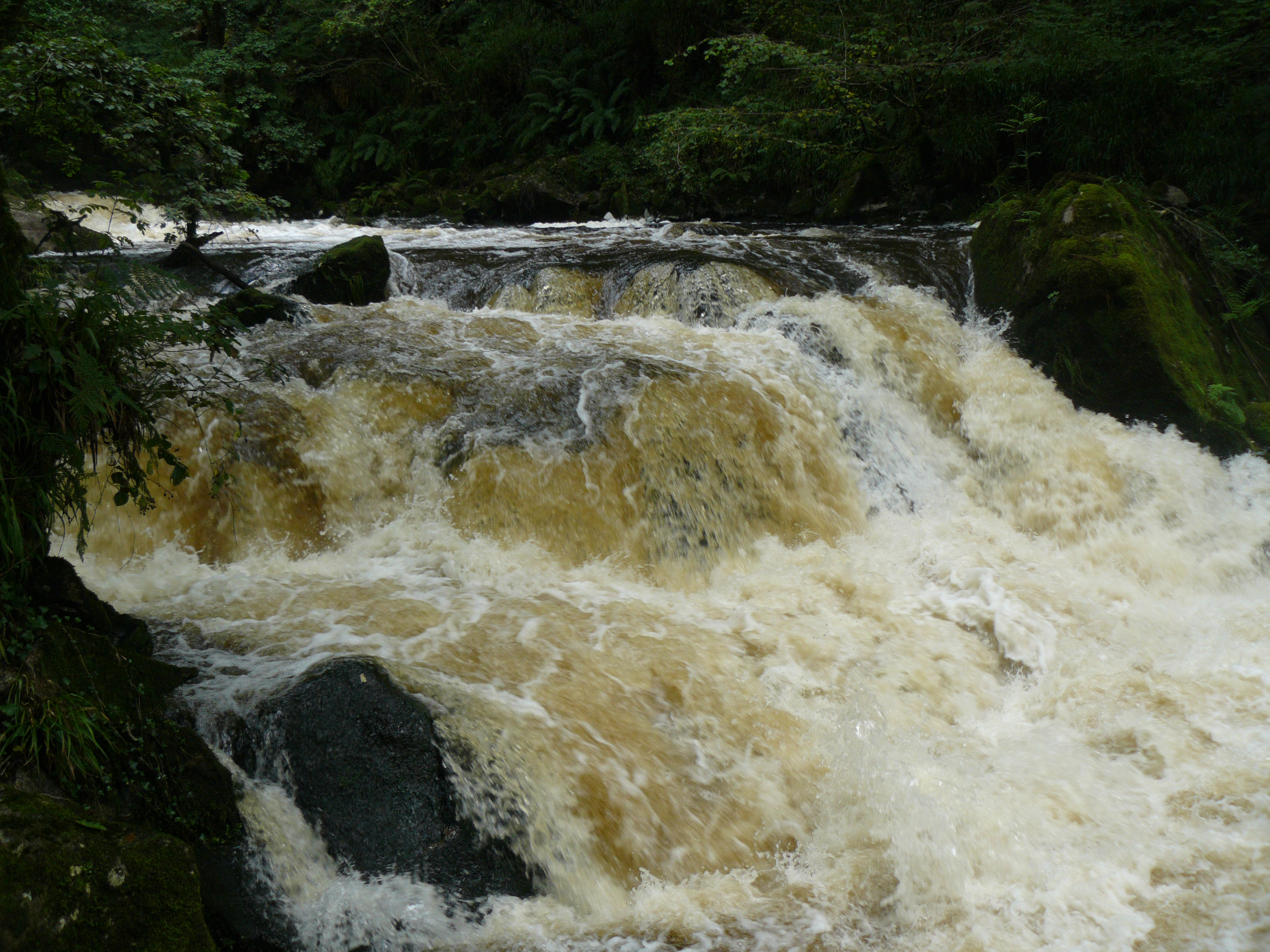
Golitha Falls

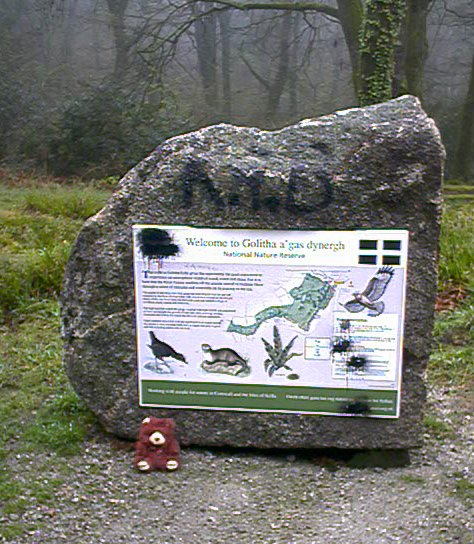
Entrance to Golitha Woods

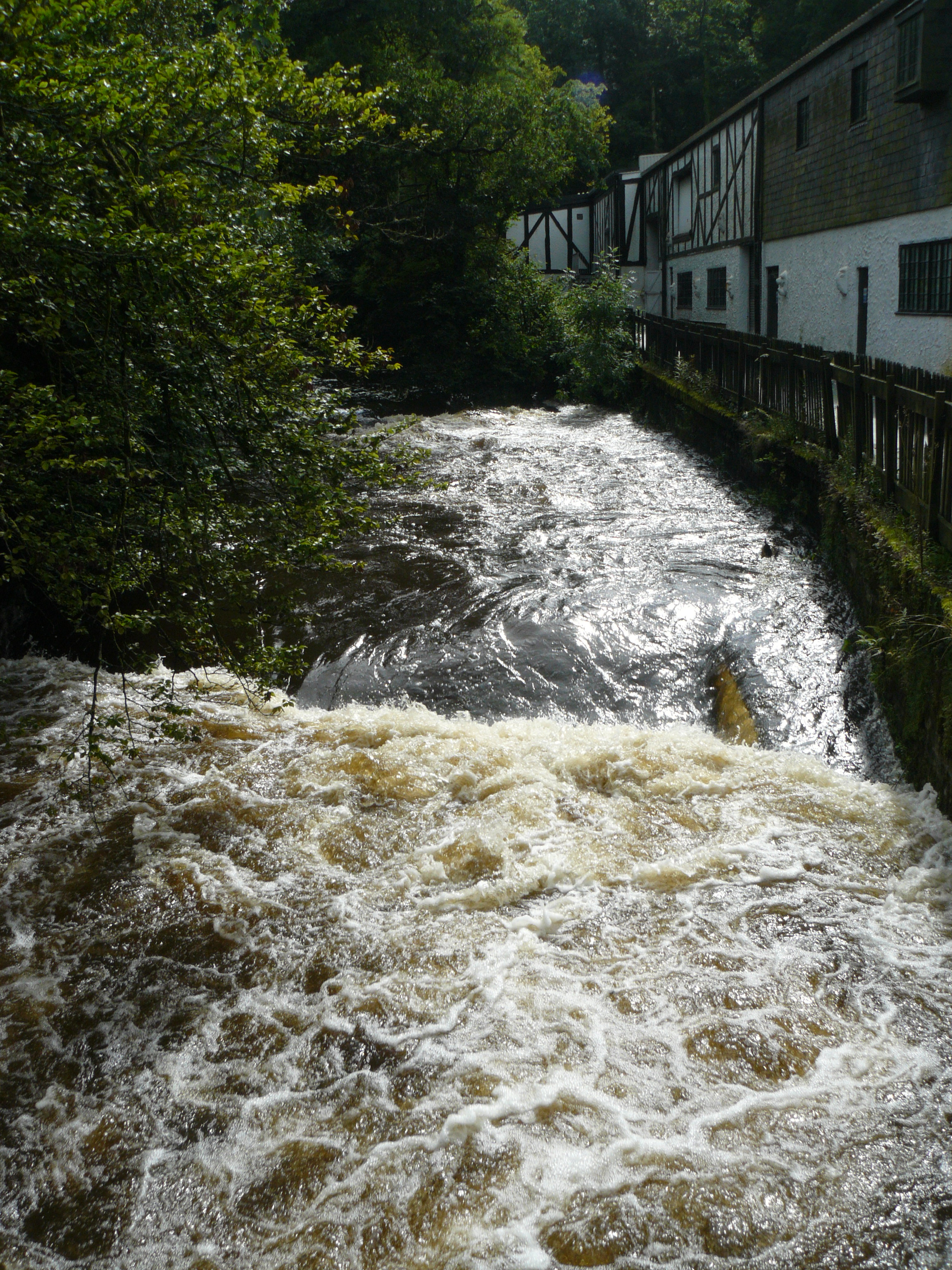
River Fowey at Trago Mills

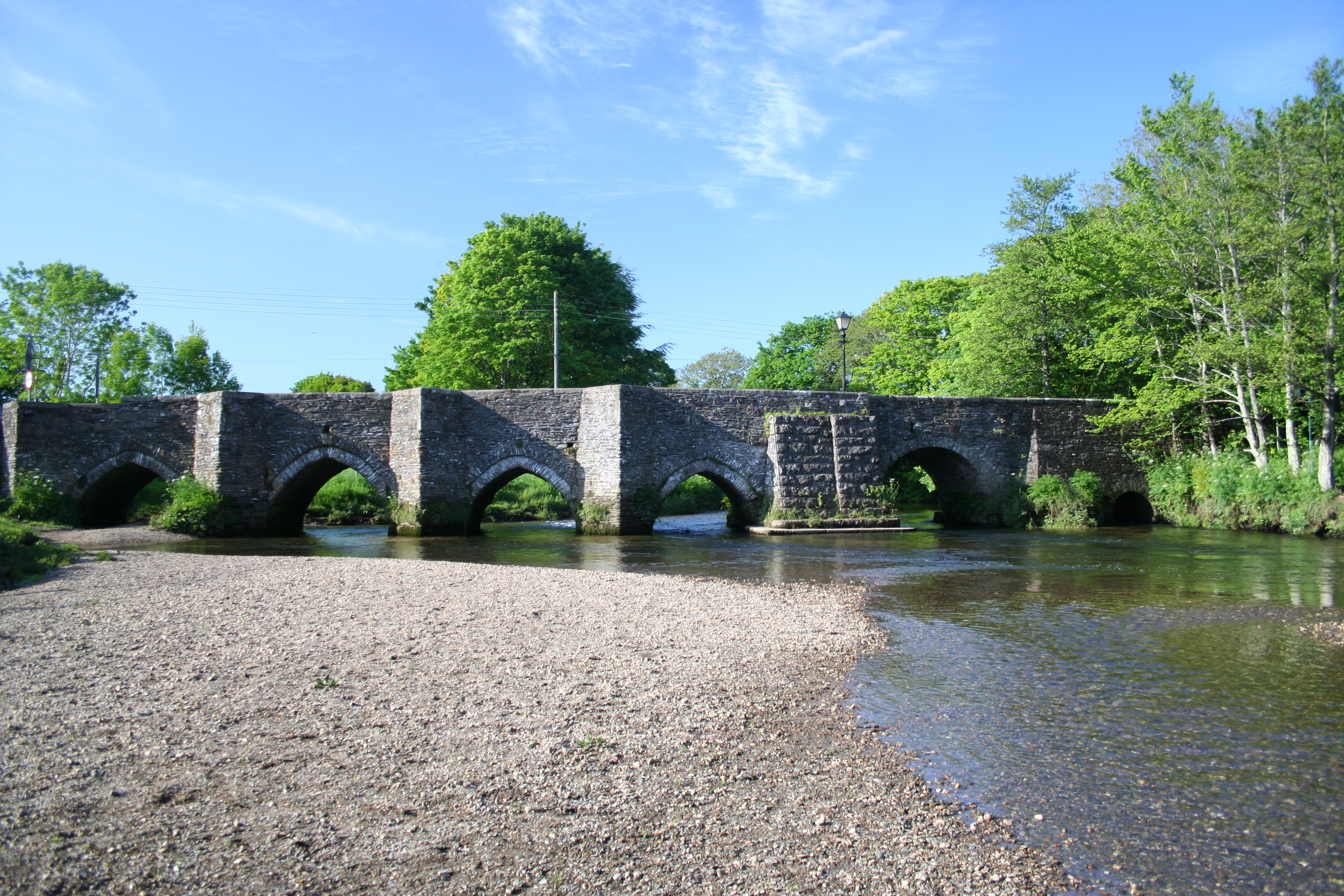
12th-century bridge at Lostwithiel, crossing the Fowey

The river runs through two Sites of Special Scientific Interest (SSSI), one of which is also part of a national nature reserve (NNR). The Upper Fowey SSSI is a floodplain on the southern slopes of Bodmin Moor and is designated for its wet heath vegetation and herbaceous valley-floor mire communities. Downstream at Golitha Falls, part of the woodland is designated a NNR and is within the Draynes Wood SSSI. At this point the river runs through a gorge and is of particular importance for ″lower plants″ such as liverworts, mosses and lichens. Golitha (pronounced Goleetha) is derived from the Cornish word for obstruction. There is a 1-to-3-mile (1.6 to 4.8 km) riverside walk, from the visitor car park. Golitha Falls is the site of Wheal Victoria copper mine.

Following volunteers collecting seagrass seeds from a donor meadow in Torpoint in autumn 2025 before planting them in the estuary, a survey carried out by Cornwall Wildlife Trust in Summer 2026 more than 430 seagrass shoots across 50 patches have been discovered

== Recreation ==
The upper part of the Fowey valley is within the Bodmin Moor area of the Cornwall Area of Outstanding Natural Beauty so many hikers, holidaymakers and tourists visit the places of interest. The river has very pleasant sites and special paths made for hiking and walking along the banks and in the countryside surrounding the towns; most of Bodmin Moor is designated as 'open access' under the Countryside and Rights of Way Act 2000.

The River Fowey is famous for its sailing because of its natural harbour. In the past it has been visited by up to 7,000 yachts in one season. Almost all sections of the river have been paddled by kayakers and canoeists: from the whitewater sections high up on the moor, all the way down to the estuary. The town of Fowey has an excellent local chandlery.

Many fish can be caught in the River Fowey so many fishermen come to enjoy the excellent fishing conditions.

== Ferry services ==
Fowey to Polruan passenger and cycle ferry – runs year round.

Fowey to Bodinnick Ferry – a ferry has operated across the crossing since at least the 14th century. Today there is a vehicle ferry that runs year round between Bodinnick slipway and Caffa Mill slipway in Fowey.

The Fowey to Mevagissey Passenger Ferry – a timetabled summer service leaving Whitehouse Slip. Journey time is around 40 minutes. It provides an alternative route to the Lost Gardens of Heligan, finishing the journey on foot or by taxi.
