= Fowey =

Town in Cornwall, England

Coordinates: 50°20′07″N 4°38′14″W

Fowey: Cornish: Fowydh
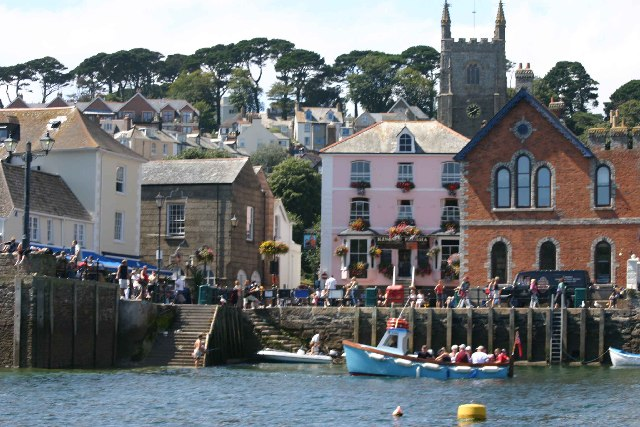
- Fowey, Town Quay: Fowey Town Hall (grey stone on the centre left), The King of Prussia Public House (pink in the centre) and the Royal British Legion Club (red brick on right)

- Location within Cornwall
- Population: 2,244 (Parish, 2021); 2,069 (Built up area, 2021)
- OS grid reference: SX126516
- Civil parish: Fowey
- Unitary authority: Cornwall
- Ceremonial county: Cornwall
- Region: South West
- Country: England
- Sovereign state: United Kingdom
- Post town: FOWEY
- Postcode district: PL23
- Dialling code: 01726
- Police: Devon and Cornwall
- Fire: Cornwall
- Ambulance: South Western
- UK Parliament: St Austell and Newquay

Fowey (/ˈfɔɪ/ FOY; Cornish: Fowydh [ˈfɔʊɪð], meaning beech trees) is a port town and civil parish at the mouth of the River Fowey in south Cornwall, England, United Kingdom. The town has been in existence since well before the Norman invasion, with the local church first established some time in the 7th century; the estuary of the River Fowey forms a natural harbour which enabled the town to become an important trading centre. Privateers also made use of the sheltered harbourage. The Lostwithiel and Fowey Railway brought China clay here for export. At the 2021 census the population of the parish was 2,244 and the population of the built up area was 2,069.

== History ==
=== Early history ===
The Domesday Book survey at the end of the 11th century records manors at Penventinue and Trenant, and a priory was soon established nearby at Tywardreath. c. 1300 the prior granted a charter to people living in Fowey itself. This medieval town ran from a north gate near Boddinick Passage to a south gate at what is now Lostwithiel Street; the town extended a little way up the hillside and was bounded on the other side by the river where merchants had their houses backing onto the waterfront. The natural harbour allowed trade to develop with continental Europe and local ship owners often hired their vessels to the king to support various wars, although the town also developed a reputation for piracy, as did many others at this time. A group of privateers known as the 'Fowey Gallants' were given licence to seize enemy vessels during the Hundred Years' War. In the 14th century the harbour was defended by 160 archers; after these were withdrawn, two blockhouses were built, one on each side of the harbour entrance. Despite these defences the town was attacked by Breton pirates in 1457. Place House, by the church, was successfully defended against the French but subsequently strengthened. This building still exists, but much remodelled. A small castle was built on St Catherine's Point, the western side of the harbour entrance, around 1540. The defences proved their worth when a Dutch attack was beaten off in 1667.

The people of Fowey generally sided with the Royalists during the English Civil War, but in 1644 the Earl of Essex brought a Parliamentarian army to Lostwithiel and occupied the peninsula around Fowey. In August, a Royalist army surrounded Essex's troops and King Charles I himself viewed Fowey from Hall Walk above Polruan, where he came close to being killed by a musket shot. On 31 August, the Parliamentarian cavalry forced their way through the Royalist lines and retreated towards Saltash, leaving the foot soldiers to be evacuated by sea from Fowey. Essex and some officers did indeed escape, but the majority of the force surrendered a few days later near Golant and were then marched to Poole, but most died before reaching there.

There was a Barbary raid on Fowey in 1645, with 240 men, women, and children captured as slaves.

=== Later history ===
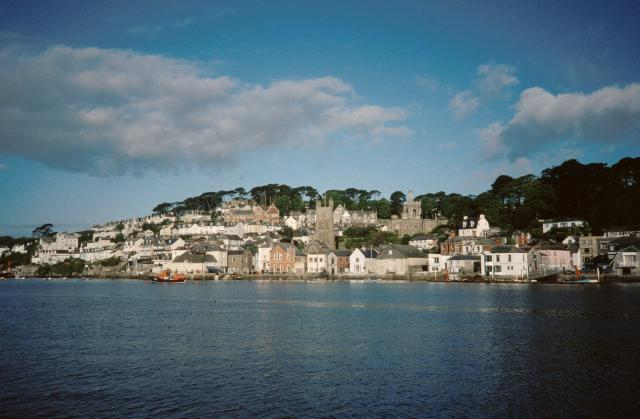
Fowey Harbour

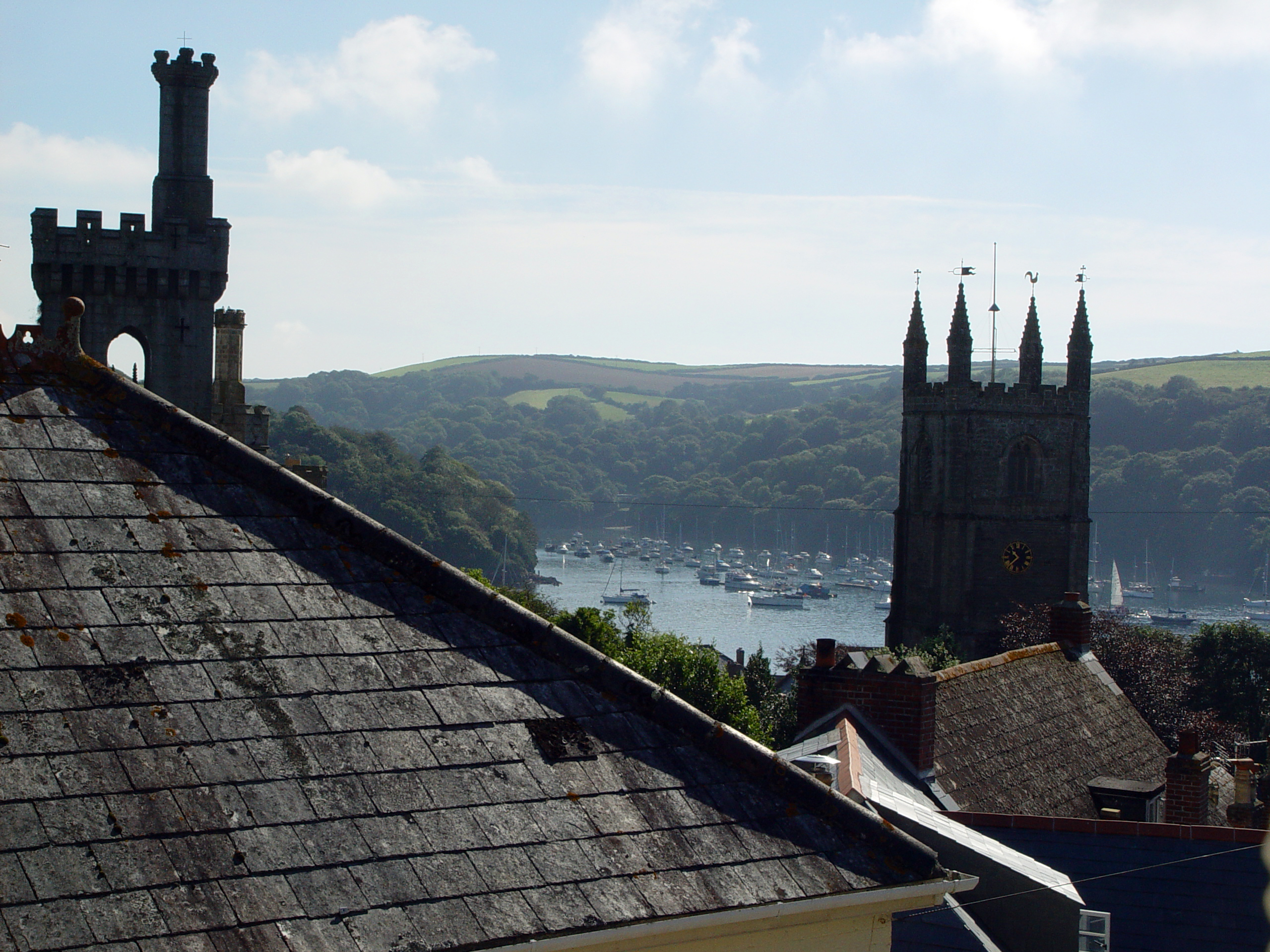
Fowey view

The fortunes of the harbour became much reduced, with trade going to Plymouth and elsewhere instead. Fishing became more important, but local merchants were often appointed as privateers and did some smuggling on the side. Tin, copper and iron mines, along with quarries and china clay pits became important industries in the area, which led to improvements at rival harbours. West Polmear beach was dug out to become Charlestown harbour circa 1800, as was Pentewan in 1826. Joseph Austen shipped copper from Caffa Mill Pill above Fowey for a while before starting work on the new Par harbour in 1829. Fowey had to wait another forty years before it saw equivalent development, but its natural deep-water anchorage and a rail link soon gave it an advantage over the shallow artificial harbours nearer to the mines and china clay works. Meanwhile, a beacon tower was erected on the Gribben Head by Trinity House to improve navigation into Fowey and around Par bay.

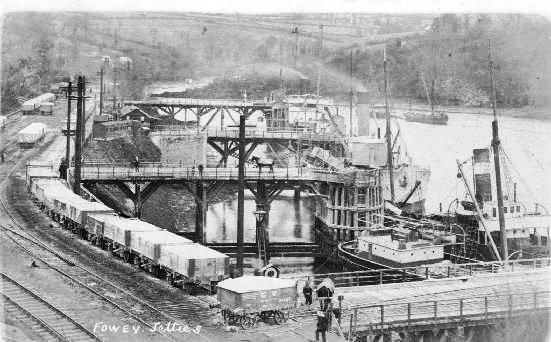
Loading china clay circa 1904 (jetty number 1 in foreground)

The Fowey Harbour Commissioners were established by an Act of Parliament in 1869, to develop and improve the harbour. On 1 June in that year, the 7 ft (2,134 mm) broad gauge Lostwithiel and Fowey Railway was opened to new jetties situated above Carne Point, and in 1873, the 4 ft 8 1/2 in (1,435 mm) standard gauge Cornwall Minerals Railway (CMR) opened a line from Newquay and Par to further jetties between Caffa Mill Pill and Carne Point. Both of these railways initially carried just goods, but on 20 June 1876, a passenger station was opened on the CMR on land reclaimed from Caffa Mill Pill. The Lostwithiel line closed at the end of 1879 but was reopened by the CMR as a standard gauge line in 1895, and the short gap between the two lines at Carne Point was eliminated. Passenger trains from Par were withdrawn after 1934 and from Lostwithiel in 1965. The Par line was subsequently converted to a dedicated roadway for lorries bringing china clay from Par after which all trains had to run via Lostwithiel.

The Royal National Lifeboat Institution established Fowey Lifeboat Station near the Town Quay in 1922 to replace an earlier station at Polkerris. This was replaced in 1997, by a new facility in Passage Street. Two lifeboats are stationed at Fowey: Maurice and Joyce Hardy, a Trent Class all weather boat that is kept afloat opposite the lifeboat station, and Olive Two, an IB1 inshore lifeboat kept inside the station and launched by davit.

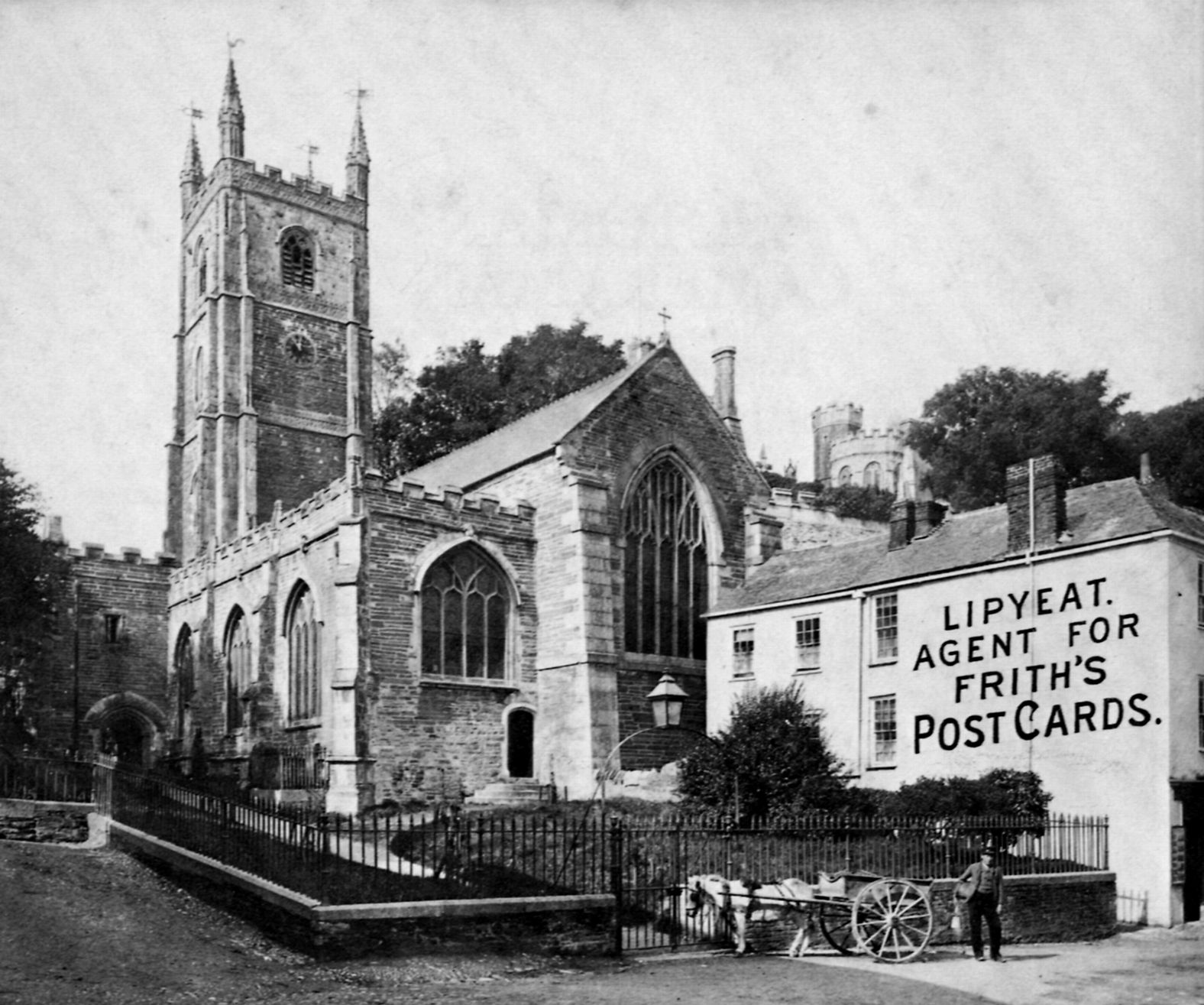
Church in Fowey (period 1850-98) by Francis Frith

Fowey was the main port for loading ammunition for the US 29th Division that landed on Omaha Beach on D Day during the Second World War. There was a munitions siding at Woodgate Pill just north of Fowey, originally built for the Great War conflict.

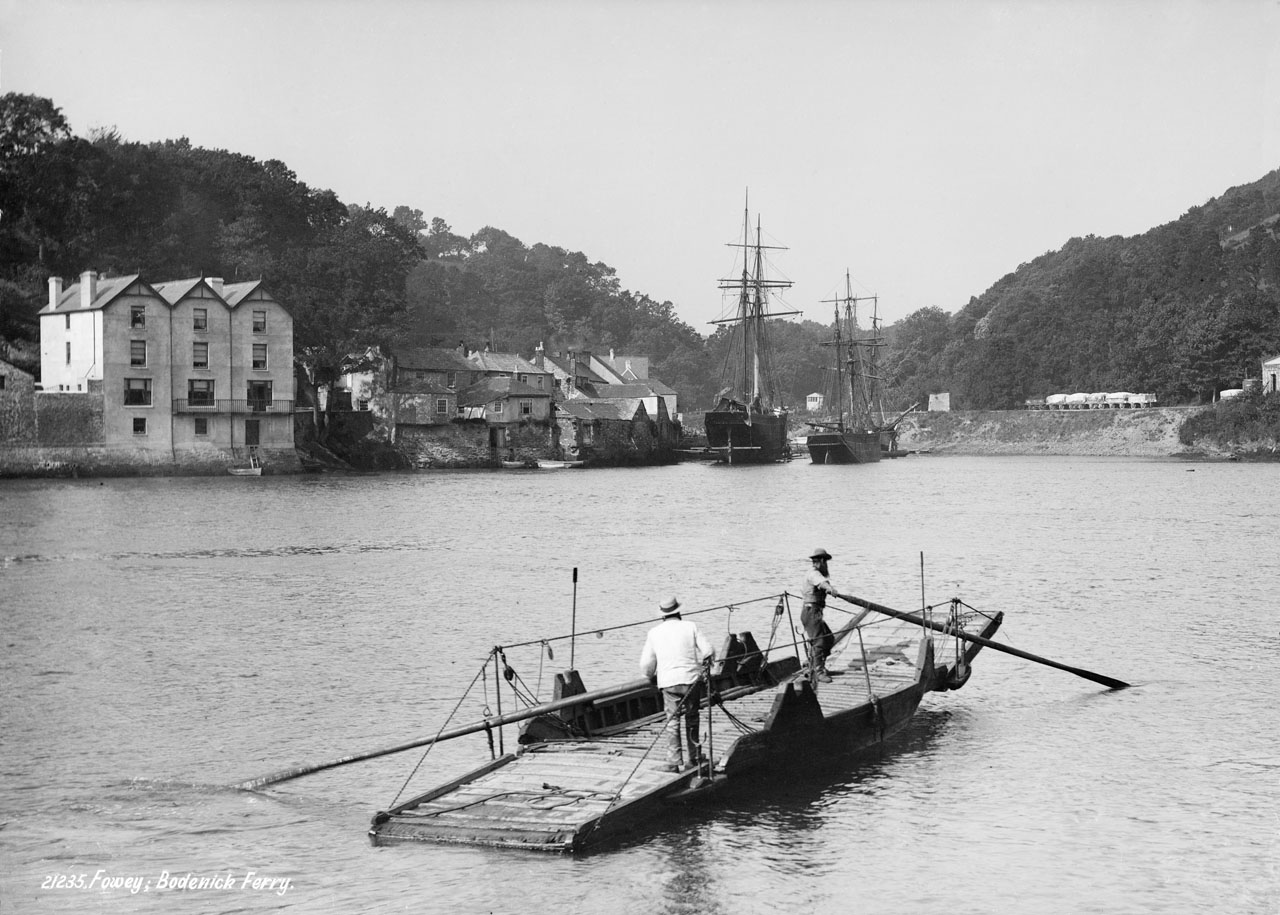
Bodinnick ferry, Fowey, Cornwall (1889).

== Geography ==
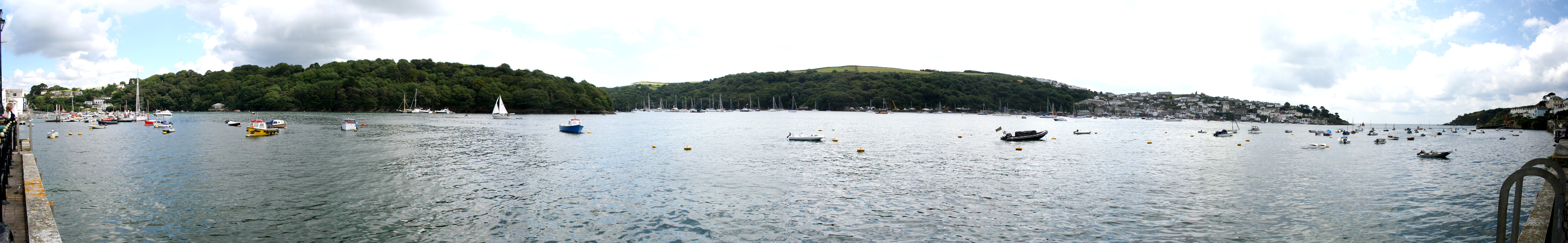
Fowey Harbour panorama

Fowey is a small town, civil parish and cargo port at the mouth of the River Fowey in south Cornwall, England. It is at the entrance to a large flooded valley created after the last ice age by the melt waters that caused the sea level to rise dramatically, creating a large natural harbour which is navigable for its last seven miles.

Fowey is in the South Coast (Eastern Section) of the Cornwall Area of Outstanding Natural Beauty. It lies at the end of the Saints' Way and has ferries across the river to Polruan (foot) and Bodinnick (vehicle). There are many historic buildings in the town, including the ruins of St Catherine's Castle, while Readymoney Cove possesses a local beach.

Besides the town of Fowey itself, the parish includes the coastal area between the mouth of the River Fowey and St Austell Bay, including Gribben Head and the small settlements of Menabilly, Polkerris, Polmear and Readymoney.

At the time of the 2001 census, Fowey had a population of 2,273. This had increased slightly at the 2011 census to 2,395. The Fowey electoral ward had a population of 4,690 in 2011.

== Governance ==
There are two tiers of local government covering Fowey, at parish (town) and unitary authority level: Fowey Town Council and Cornwall Council. The town council meets at Fowey Town Hall on the Town Quay, which was completed in 1787.

Fowey lies within the St Austell and Newquay constituency for elections to the United Kingdom Parliament.

=== Administrative history ===
Fowey was an ancient parish in the Powder Hundred of Cornwall. From the 13th century Fowey had some of the characteristics of a borough, including the right to appoint a portreeve. From 1571 the town formed the Fowey parliamentary borough (constituency), although it was not formally incorporated as a borough for municipal purposes until 1685. The seal of the borough of Fowey depicted a ship of three masts with its topsail furled and the legend "Sigillum oppidi de Fowy Anno Dom. 1702".

From 1807 the borough corporation became embroiled in lengthy legal disputes with Joseph Treffry (also known as Joseph Austen) of Place House. The Treffry family as lords of the manor had granted various land and rights in trust to the corporation over many years. The corporation received rents from the land and tolls from the market and quay, and in return was supposed to pave the streets and maintain the town's grammar school. Treffry claimed the corporation had been letting the land out at a small fraction of market value to its political allies (who were Treffry's political opponents) in an effort to influence elections for Fowey's members of parliament. He also said money for the school was being misappropriated and the corporation had failed to publish accounts for many years. He therefore argued that the corporation had breached the terms of the trusts, and the lands and rights should be returned to him. Treffry managed to get the corporation's charter revoked in 1817, but supporters of the corporation managed to get a new charter granted in 1819. In 1826 the mayor and several officers of the corporation were removed from office after irregularities in their elections were proved in court, leaving the corporation comprising just three aldermen. They made no further attempt to revive the corporation, which therefore ceased to operate. Six years later the constituency was also abolished under the Reform Act 1832.

When elected parish and district councils were established under the Local Government Act 1894, Fowey was given a parish council and included in the St Austell Rural District. In 1913 the parish was removed from the rural district and raised to the status of a municipal borough, with a borough council replacing the parish council and taking over district-level functions. The borough was merged with the nearby and much larger St Austell in 1968 to form the borough of St Austell with Fowey.

The borough of St Austell with Fowey was abolished six years later in 1974 under the Local Government Act 1972, when the area became part of the new borough of Restormel. The area of the former borough of St Austell with Fowey became an unparished area as a result of the 1974 reforms. A new civil parish of Fowey was subsequently created in 1983, with its parish council taking the name Fowey Town Council.

Restormel was abolished in 2009. Cornwall County Council then took on district-level functions, making it a unitary authority, and was renamed Cornwall Council.

== Religious sites ==
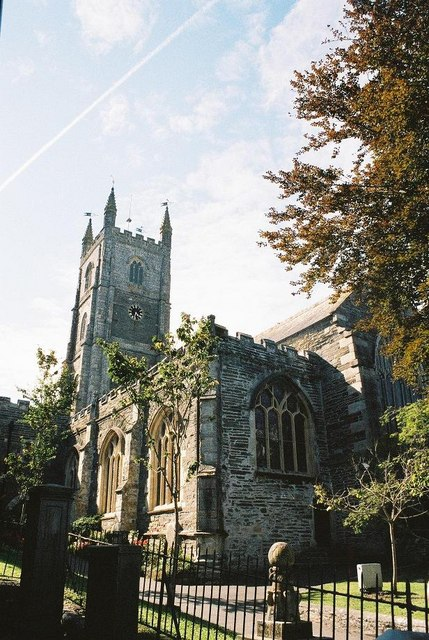
Fowey Parish Church

Popular legend has it that Jesus visited Fowey as a child, along with Joseph of Arimathea who was a merchant visiting local tin mines in which he had a commercial interest. At the entrance to the river, on the eastern side below the cliffs to the south-west of St Saviour's Point, there is a cross to commemorate this supposed visit. This cross is marked on very early charts and was maintained by monks from Tywardreath. The cross is known locally as "Punches Cross", supposedly derived from the name of Pontius Pilate.

One hundred yards west of the lighthouse on the west of the harbour entrance, about thirty feet below the top of the cliff edge and broadly concealed, is a small grass area known as "Johnny May's Chapel". This name is believed to be that of a Methodist preacher at the time when Nonconformism was persecuted.

The Church of St Fimbarrus, Fowey, also known as Fowey Parish Church, is a grade I listed building. It was built in the early 14th century and rededicated in 1336, replacing a previous Norman church. It is belongs to the Church of England's Diocese of Truro.

== Economy ==
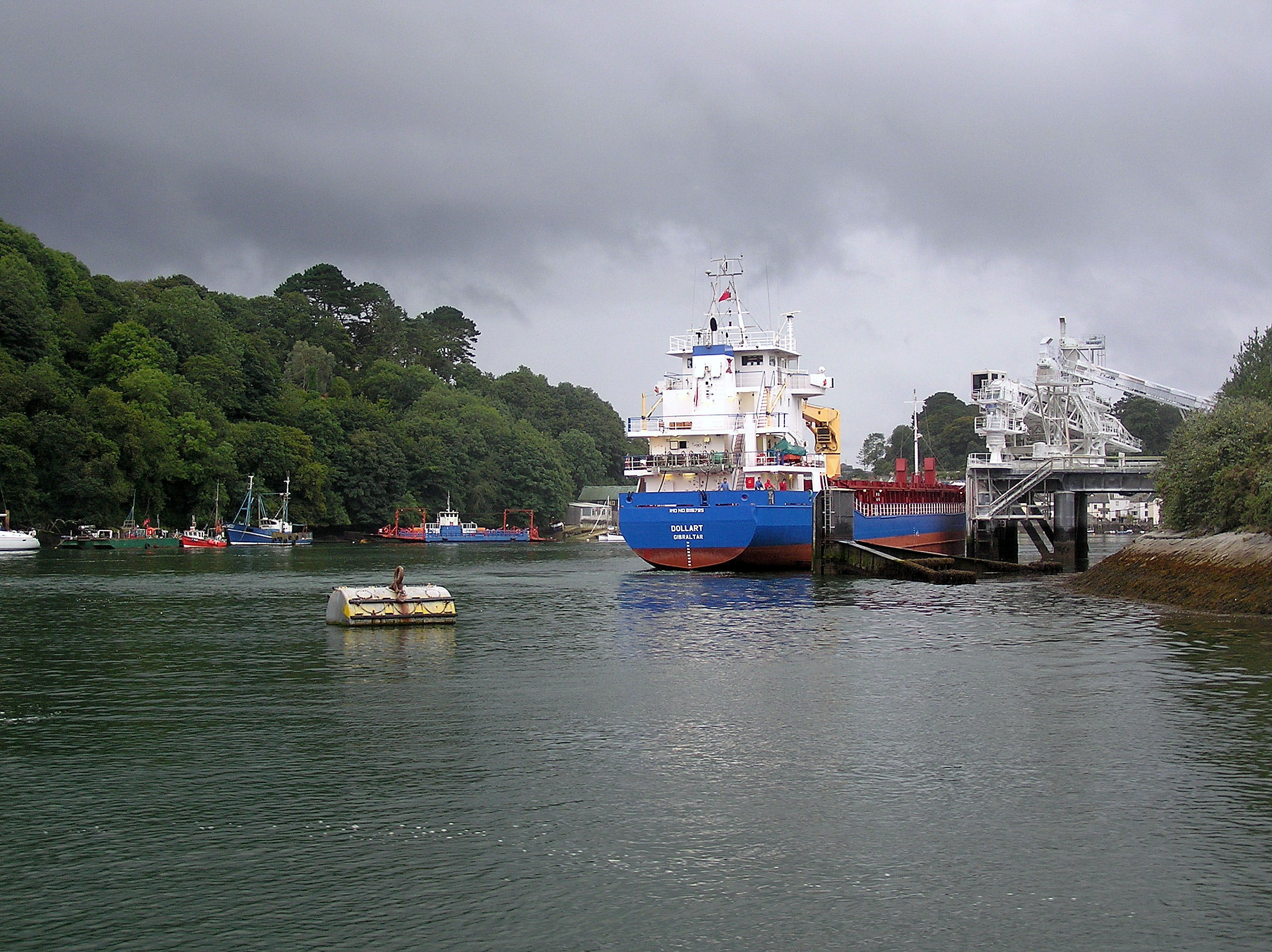
Loading china clay at Carne Point

Fowey has thrived as a port for hundreds of years, initially as a trading and naval town, then as the centre for china clay exports. Today Fowey is busy with trawlers and yachts. Tourism is also an important source of income, contributing £14m to the local economy and accounting for more than half of the jobs in the town.

== Transport ==
Although Fowey railway station closed to passengers in 1965, the Lostwithiel to Fowey branch line remains open for goods traffic, carrying bulk china clay to the jetties at Carne Point. The nearest passenger station is at Par, whence there are trains to Penzance, Newquay, Plymouth, Bristol and London Paddington.Transport for Cornwall operate services numbered 25 and 24, between Fowey, Par station and St Austell. The frequency varies from one bus per 1.5 hour on Sundays to two buses per hour on weekdays. From St Austell bus station connecting buses operate to other places in Cornwall. There is also a local town bus running from outside the church in the town centre to the main car park on Hanson Drive.

Both vehicle and foot ferry services cross the river to Bodinnick and Polruan. A ship to shore water taxi service operates from Easter until the end of October and a foot ferry to the fishing village of Mevagissey runs from 1 May to 1 October, weather permitting.

== Education ==
Fowey has two schools: Fowey Primary School and Fowey River Academy, both of which are in Windmill Road. Fowey Grammar School, for which its architect Silvanus Trevail received a silver medal, was demolished in 1999.

== Culture ==
Fowey has been the inspiration for many authors, including Sir Arthur Quiller-Couch ('Q'), who lived in the town in retirement, and Daphne du Maurier. The du Maurier Festival Society runs the Fowey Festival of Arts and Literature each May, the month of her birth.

Various visual artists have had close connection with Fowey and lived there, including Fred Yates (painter), Andrew Litten Amanda Hoskin who primarily paints the local coastline. and Mabel Lucie Attwell. Fowey holds an annual Christmas craft market.

An engraving of a painting by Thomas Allom entitled Fowey Harbour, St. Saviour's Chapel & Polruan Castle together with a poetical illustration by Letitia Elizabeth Landon, which recounts the repelling of the French 'out of her house' (that is, Place House) in Fowey by the wife of 'Thomas Treury, the 2d' in her husband's absence, around the time of Henry 6th, was published in Fisher's Drawing Room Scrap Book, 1832.

== Sports ==
The surrounding coastline of Fowey is popular with fishermen and spear-fishermen. Many sea creatures can be seen all around the Cornish shoreline, including mullet, bass, mackerel, lobsters and cuttlefish. Many of the species can be seen in the Fowey Aquarium in the heart of the town, which includes a very rare Albino Bull Huss.

The Royal Fowey Yacht Club is based on the harbour front. A Pilot Gig Rowing Club races in and around Cornwall, with an event at Fowey being held the same week as the Regatta. The club launches from Caffa Mill slip. Fowey Golf Club was founded in 1894 and continued until the late 1940s.

== Cornish wrestling ==
Cornish wrestling tournaments, for prizes, were held in Fowey at the Fowey Grammar School sports ground.

== Notable people ==
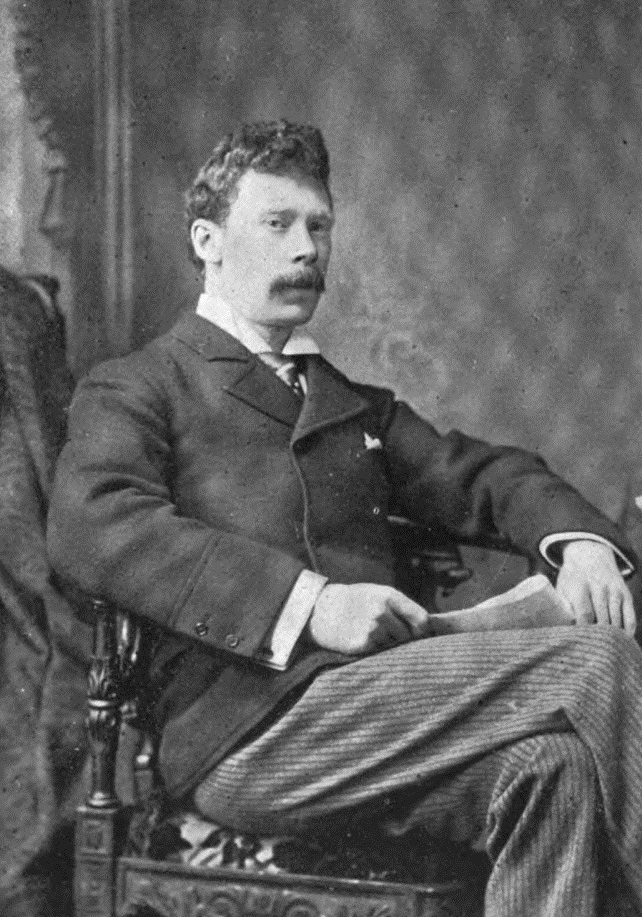
Arthur Quiller-Couch, pre-1898

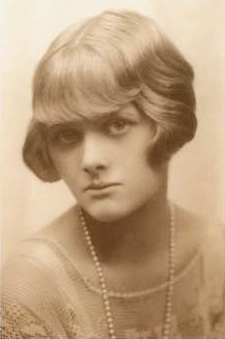
Daphne du Maurier ca. 1930

- Charles Fitzgeoffrey (1576–1638), an Elizabethan poet and clergyman, son of the Rector of Fowey.
- Hugh Peters (or Peter) (1598–1660), an English preacher, political advisor and soldier.
- Philip Rashleigh (1729–1811), an antiquary. Fellow of the Royal Society and a Cornish squire.
- Mary Bryant (born 1765) was born in Fowey before being transported as a convict to the colony of New South Wales, where she became one of the first escapees.
- James Brudenell, 7th Earl of Cardigan (1797–1868), Army officer and local MP.
- John Whitehead Peard (1811–1880), a British soldier renowned as 'Garibaldi's Englishman'
- Kenneth Grahame (1859–1932) writer of The Wind in the Willows (1908) lived for part of the year in Fowey during the 1890s to 1901.
- Sir Arthur Quiller-Couch (1863–1944) settled in Fowey in 1891 and remained there for the rest of his life. Quiller-Couch was an author and professor of English literature primarily recalled for his influential literary criticism.
- Mabel Lucie Attwell (1879–1964), comics artist and illustrator, drew cute, nostalgic drawings of children, based on her daughter, Peggy. They featured on many postcards, advertisements, posters, books and figurines. Died locally.
- Leo Walmsley (1892 – 1966) was an English writer, wrote the Bramblewick series, based on Robin Hood's Bay, lived locally.
- Clarence F. Leary (1894–1918), a United States Navy officer and Navy Cross winner, born locally
- Aileen Davies (1902–1981), singer. actress and principal mezzo-soprano with the D'Oyly Carte Opera
- Percy Varco (1904–1982), footballer who played over 180 games, also Mayor of Fowey.
- Daphne du Maurier (1907–1989) English author and playwright; lived in Fowey. Her works include Rebecca, an adaptation of which won the best Picture Oscar in 1941, Jamaica Inn and numerous short stories including The Birds and Don't Look Now that were turned into films.
- Margot Marshall (1918-2010), British Army officer in WWII, helped organise the Potsdam Conference.
- Antony Hewish (1924–2021), radio astronomer, co-recipient of the 1974 Nobel Prize for Physics.
- Noël Goodwin (1927–2013), music and dance critic of classical music and ballet.
- Gordon Waller (1945-2009), of the singing duo Peter and Gordon, featured om A World Without Love, resided locally for eight years.
- Dawn French (born 1957), actress and comedian, lived at Fowey until 2021.

A number of entertainers have primary and secondary residences around the town including: Richard Madeley and Judy Finnigan, Gloria Hunniford, and former Blue Peter presenter Janet Ellis.
