= Grade II* listed buildings in Cornwall (Q–Z) =

Cornwall shown in England

There are over 20,000 Grade II* listed buildings in England. This article comprises a list of these buildings in the county of Cornwall.

== List of buildings ==
Name	Location	Type	Completed (Note: The date given is the date used by Historic England as significant for the initial building or that of an important part in the structure's description.)	Date designated	Grid ref. (Note: The grid reference is based on the British national grid reference system, sometimes known as OSGB36, used by the Ordnance Survey.) Geo-coordinates	Entry number (Note: The "List Entry Number" is a unique number assigned to each listed building and scheduled monument by Historic England.)	Image
Radford	Werrington	Farmhouse	15th century	11 February 1988	SX3180588999; 50°40′35″N 4°22′55″W	1309960	Upload Photo
Rectory Farmhouse	Morwenstow	Farmhouse	14th century	18 October 1984	SS2055715219; 50°54′31″N 4°33′13″W	1231523	Rectory Farmhouse
Red Cross Stone in Pleasaunce to the east of Tonacombe Manor	Tonacombe Manor, Morwenstow	Cross	c.Late 12th century	29 September 1961	SS2095014507; 50°54′08″N 4°32′52″W	1231905	Upload Photo
Redevallen	Trevalga	House	Probably 1642	19 January 1952	SX0994088562; 50°39′56″N 4°41′27″W	1267261	Upload Photo
Remains of Carclew House	Mylor	Country house	c.1720s	30 May 1967	SW7896738159; 50°12′07″N 5°05′55″W	1160291	Upload Photo
Remains of St Thomas Priory	St Thomas, Launceston	Augustinian monastery	13th century	13 September 1972	SX3281485016; 50°38′27″N 4°21′57″W	1206706	Upload Photo
Respryn Bridge	Lanhydrock, St Winnow	Bridge	15th century	6 June 1969	SX0994463488; 50°26′25″N 4°40′41″W	1143087	Respryn Bridge More images
Respryn Bridge	St. Winnow	Bridge	15th century	21 August 1964	SX0994463487; 50°26′25″N 4°40′41″W	1329286	Respryn Bridge More images
Rialton Manor	Colan	House	Early 16th century	10 February 1967	SW8476762233; 50°25′14″N 5°01′53″W	1137187	Upload Photo
Rose in Vale Country House Hotel	Rose in Vale, Perranzabuloe	Country house	c.Late 18th century	30 May 1967	SW7467750674; 50°18′46″N 5°09′58″W	1141527	Rose in Vale Country House Hotel More images
Rosecadgehill House	Penzance	House	1699	29 July 1950	SW4603530828; 50°07′23″N 5°33′16″W	1143171	Upload Photo
Rosehill Manor	Penzance	Country house	1814	7 February 1974	SW4575630541; 50°07′13″N 5°33′29″W	1327861	Rosehill Manor More images
Rosemerryn House	Budock	House	c.1720	10 July 1957	SW7834030026; 50°07′44″N 5°06′10″W	1146478	Rosemerryn House More images
Rosemorran House and front garden walls	Rosemorran, Madron	Cottage ornee	Late 18th century	10 June 1954	SW4760732513; 50°08′20″N 5°32′01″W	1136807	Rosemorran House and front garden walls
Rosewarne House	Camborne	House	c.1815	1 December 1951	SW6483740411; 50°13′01″N 5°17′52″W	1142639	Upload Photo
Roskruge Barton Farmhouse and rear garden walls	St Anthony-in-Meneage	Farmhouse	Late Medieval	10 July 1957	SW7756523575; 50°04′14″N 5°06′35″W	1141681	Upload Photo
Rosteague House and stable block	Gerrans	Country house	15th/16th century	28 February 1952	SW8734333547; 50°09′49″N 4°58′44″W	1141012	Upload Photo
Round Cottage	Philleigh	House	c.1800	30 May 1967	SW8709639370; 50°12′57″N 4°59′08″W	1140987	Round Cottage More images
Row of 3 cottages and wash-house about 150m west of Penheale Manor	Penheale, Egloskerry	Estate cottage	Early 20th century	11 January 1989	SX2666388001; 50°39′57″N 4°27′15″W	1142920	Upload Photo
Royal Albert Bridge and 17 Approach Spans	Saltash	Railway bridge	19th century	17 January 1952	SX4351558740; 50°24′28″N 4°12′16″W	1159292	Royal Albert Bridge and 17 Approach Spans More images
Ruins of the Chapel of St Thomas Becket	Bodmin	Chapel	Licensed 1377	8 June 1972	SX0736267025; 50°28′17″N 4°42′58″W	1195280	Ruins of the Chapel of St Thomas Becket More images
Ruthern Bridge	Ruthernbridge, Lanivet	Bridge	c.1450	6 June 1969	SX0130066830; 50°28′03″N 4°48′05″W	1327925	Ruthern Bridge More images
Sara's Foundry, Town Mill	Redruth	Corn mill	19th century	12 September 1989	SW6914142586; 50°14′17″N 5°14′20″W	1142573	Sara's Foundry, Town Mill
Saveock Manor Farmhouse	Kea	Farmhouse	c.Mid-18th century	12 March 1986	SW7672644435; 50°15′27″N 5°08′01″W	1140855	Upload Photo
Sea lock, lock gates and hand winches	Bude, Bude–Stratton	Lock	Early 19th century	9 September 1985	SS2040906415; 50°49′46″N 4°33′05″W	1328520	Sea lock, lock gates and hand winches More images
Service building in the stable yard about 10m south of Lanhydrock House	Lanhydrock Park, Lanhydrock	House	c.1882	15 April 1988	SX0856763548; 50°26′26″N 4°41′50″W	1157977	Service building in the stable yard about 10m south of Lanhydrock House More images
Shire Hall	Bodmin	Town hall	1837–38	26 March 1949	SX0717266922; 50°28′13″N 4°43′07″W	1025049	Shire Hall More images
Shire House	Bodmin	Judges lodgings	c.1840	26 March 1949	SX0720366911; 50°28′13″N 4°43′06″W	1298216	Shire House More images
Sir William Moyle's Almshouses	St Germans	House	1583	21 July 1951	SX3546957922; 50°23′53″N 4°18′59″W	1140548	Sir William Moyle's Almshouses
South entrance to Prideaux Place	Prideaux Place, Padstow	Arch	c.18th century, before 1758	20 May 1988	SW9140375432; 50°32′29″N 4°56′43″W	1212204	South entrance to Prideaux Place More images
South harbour pier, quay and walls on south-west side of harbour	Boscastle, Forrabury and Minster	Harbour	c.1584	17 December 1962	SX0951391496; 50°41′31″N 4°41′54″W	1143473	South harbour pier, quay and walls on south-west side of harbour More images
South Pier	Penzance	Lighthouse	Before 1512	6 March 2003	SW4779030044; 50°07′00″N 5°31′46″W	1096159	South Pier More images
South Terrace with grotto niche to south of Prideaux Place	Prideaux Place, Padstow	Terrace	c.1740	20 May 1988	SW9139575491; 50°32′31″N 4°56′44″W	1212202	South Terrace with grotto niche to south of Prideaux Place More images
St Benet's Abbey	Lanivet	Abbey	1411	25 October 1951	SX0381963652; 50°26′23″N 4°45′51″W	1143103	Upload Photo
St Breock Place	St Breock	House	c.Late 17th century	4 November 1988	SW9771471868; 50°30′42″N 4°51′16″W	1143038	Upload Photo
St Catherine's Castle	Fowey	Castle	Early 16th century	11 March 1974	SX1178450958; 50°19′42″N 4°38′45″W	1218875	St Catherine's Castle More images
St Julian's Well	Mount Edgcumbe Country Park, Maker-with-Rame	Holy well	14th/15th century	23 January 1968	SX4464552165; 50°20′56″N 4°11′06″W	1329144	St Julian's Well More images
St Mellor's Well	Linkinhorne	Holy well	15th century	21 August 1964	SX3190573147; 50°32′02″N 4°22′24″W	1159088	Upload Photo
St Michael's Church	Baldhu, Kea	Anglican church	1847	12 March 1986	SW7720743178; 50°14′47″N 5°07′35″W	1329026	St Michael's Church More images
St Piran's and surrounding garden walls	Trethevy, Tintagel	House	c.Late 16th century	17 December 1962	SX0762089166; 50°40′13″N 4°43′26″W	1223492	Upload Photo
Stable about 35m west of Lancarffe	Lancarffe, Helland	Stable	Late 17th/early 18th century	6 June 1969	SX0818568963; 50°29′20″N 4°42′20″W	1143120	Upload Photo
Stables adjoining Trenethick Barton Farmhouse	Trenethick, Wendron	Stable	Late 17th century	17 June 1988	SW6680629115; 50°06′58″N 5°15′48″W	1309611	Upload Photo
Stables and coach-house WSW of Trewardreva House	Trewardreva, Constantine	Stable	Probably 1719	17 June 1988	SW7257730143; 50°07′40″N 5°11′00″W	1142138	Upload Photo
Stables and gate piers, Port Eliot	St Germans	Stable	1802–06	23 January 1968	SX3580257971; 50°23′55″N 4°18′42″W	1329204	Upload Photo
Stamps engine house and attached stamps approx 75m south-east of Count House at King Edward Mine	Camborne	Engine house	1902	12 September 1989	SW6638338917; 50°12′15″N 5°16′31″W	1159218	Stamps engine house and attached stamps approx 75m south-east of Count House at King Edward Mine
Stanbury Manor and garden wall about 6m south of the south front	Stanbury Manor, Morwenstow	Farmhouse	Late 16th and 17th century	26 September 1951	SS2098913909; 50°53′49″N 4°32′49″W	1231145	Upload Photo
Statue about 5m west of Pentillie Castle	Pillaton	Statue	Late 17th century	19 October 1987	SX4098164554; 50°27′33″N 4°14′30″W	1140190	Upload Photo
Stithians Methodist Church (formerly Penmennor Methodist Church)	Hendra, Stithians	Church	1865	17 June 1988	SW7241537057; 50°11′23″N 5°11′23″W	1161993	Stithians Methodist Church (formerly Penmennor Methodist Church)
Stoke Climsland Church	Stokeclimsland	Church	15th century	22 November 1960	SX3605174386; 50°32′46″N 4°18′55″W	1220632	Stoke Climsland Church More images
Stone cross at SX07856754 at junction with Old Callywith Road	Bodmin	Preaching cross	Pre-Conquest or medieval	26 March 1949	SX0785467539; 50°28′34″N 4°42′34″W	1195252	Stone cross at SX07856754 at junction with Old Callywith Road More images
Stone cross at SX088656, Carminow (Carminow Cross)	Bodmin	Cross	Pre-Conquest or medieval	26 March 1949	SX0884065689; 50°27′35″N 4°41′40″W	1298242	Stone cross at SX088656, Carminow (Carminow Cross) More images
Stone Cross in cemetery immediately west of Berry Tower	Bodmin	Preaching cross	Possibly pre-Conquest	8 June 1972	SX0724067468; 50°28′31″N 4°43′05″W	1195254	Stone Cross in cemetery immediately west of Berry Tower
Stone cross in churchyard, immediately south of St Uny's Church	Lelant, St. Ives	Cross		4 June 1952	SW5482537695; 50°11′18″N 5°26′10″W	1143355	Stone cross in churchyard, immediately south of St Uny's Church
Stone cross in furthermost southern churchyard south of St Uny's Church	Lelant, St. Ives	Cross		4 June 1952	SW5482637652; 50°11′17″N 5°26′10″W	1136866	Upload Photo
Stone cross in western cemetery (at crossing of paths) west of St Uny's Church	Lelant, St. Ives	Cross		4 June 1952	SW5475637726; 50°11′19″N 5°26′13″W	1143354	Upload Photo
Stone cross near junction with Church Street	Helston	Preaching cross	Probably pre-Conquest	24 March 1950	SW6585027650; 50°06′10″N 5°16′33″W	1297699	Stone cross near junction with Church Street More images
Stuart House	Liskeard	House	17th century	23 September 1950	SX2511164490; 50°27′15″N 4°27′54″W	1203150	Stuart House More images
Summerhouse about 120m north of the Downs	Hayle	Summerhouse	c.1880	14 January 1988	SW5553336849; 50°10′52″N 5°25′32″W	1327604	Upload Photo
Summerhouse about 20m north-east of the Downs	Hayle	Summerhouse	c.1880	14 January 1988	SW5557736760; 50°10′49″N 5°25′30″W	1143672	Upload Photo
Survey Office about 100m south of Count House at King Edward Mine	Camborne	Drawing office	c.1899	12 September 1989	SW6636138879; 50°12′13″N 5°16′32″W	1311128	Survey Office about 100m south of Count House at King Edward Mine
Temple of Milton	Mount Edgcumbe Country Park, Maker-with-Rame	Temple	Late 18th century	23 January 1968	SX4571452625; 50°21′12″N 4°10′12″W	1140616	Temple of Milton More images
Terrace walls about 40m north of the Downs	Hayle, Hayle	Wall	c.1880	14 January 1988	SW5554136780; 50°10′50″N 5°25′32″W	1160465	Upload Photo
Terrace walls immediately north of the Downs	Hayle	Wall	c.1880	14 January 1988	SW5552936744; 50°10′49″N 5°25′32″W	1143671	Upload Photo
The Church of St Piran and St Michael	Churchtown Perranuthnoe, Perranuthnoe	Parish church	Mostly rebuilt c.1470	10 June 1954	SW5375229551; 50°06′53″N 5°26′45″W	1310512	The Church of St Piran and St Michael More images
The City Hall	Truro	Town hall	1846	8 January 1971	SW8268544781; 50°15′47″N 5°03′02″W	1201442	The City Hall More images
The Coach House	Mylor	Stable	c.Late 18th century	30 May 1967	SW7885438011; 50°12′03″N 5°06′01″W	1141660	Upload Photo
The Coach House, including courtyard walls and gate piers immediately north-west of Trewinnard Manor farmhouse	St Erth	Coach house	Mid-18th century	14 January 1988	SW5460534031; 50°09′20″N 5°26′12″W	1327655	Upload Photo
The Culver House	Bussow, St Ives	Dovecote	Medieval	4 June 1952	SW4985338738; 50°11′44″N 5°30′23″W	1143307	Upload Photo
The Day Mark	St Martin's, Isles of Scilly	Day mark	1683	6 April 1959	SV9418616093; 49°57′59″N 6°15′58″W	1141204	The Day Mark More images
The Donald Thomas Centre, with forecourt railings	Camborne	Literary institute	1842	1 December 1951	SW6469340052; 50°12′49″N 5°17′58″W	1142652	Upload Photo
The Eagle House Hotel	Launceston	Detached house	1764	27 February 1950	SX3304084709; 50°38′17″N 4°21′45″W	1297884	The Eagle House Hotel More images
The East Round House	Veryan	House	c.1820	30 May 1967	SW9151839414; 50°13′04″N 4°55′26″W	1291400	The East Round House More images
The Fisherman's Arms	East Looe, Looe	Merchants house	1611	19 March 1951	SX2559453231; 50°21′11″N 4°27′11″W	1201112	The Fisherman's Arms More images
The French Gun Battery (north-west corner)	St Michael's Mount	Battery	Probably early 19th century	9 October 1987	SW5142729859; 50°07′00″N 5°28′43″W	1310674	The French Gun Battery (north-west corner) More images
The Glebe Country House	Philleigh	House	1727	30 May 1967	SW8714139335; 50°12′56″N 4°59′06″W	1328938	Upload Photo
The Glebe House	St Columb Major	House	1638	7 January 1952	SW9130163632; 50°26′07″N 4°56′25″W	1144067	The Glebe House More images
The Golden Guinea Restaurant	East Looe, Looe	Cross passage house	Early 17th century	19 March 1951	SX2553253336; 50°21′14″N 4°27′14″W	1282859	The Golden Guinea Restaurant More images
The Guard House	Hugh Town, St. Mary's, Isles of Scilly	House	Early 17th century	12 February 1975	SV9006410653; 49°54′56″N 6°19′08″W	1218940	Upload Photo
The Harbour Walls and Bollards	St Michael's Mount	Harbour	Early 15th century	9 October 1987	SW5145230153; 50°07′09″N 5°28′42″W	1143786	The Harbour Walls and Bollards More images
The Ignioc Stone, 2m south of St Clement Church	St Clement	Cross/incised stone	3rd century	30 May 1967	SW8506643869; 50°15′20″N 5°01′00″W	1141078	The Ignioc Stone, 2m south of St Clement Church More images
The Keep, about 50m east of Golden Manor	Probus	House	16th century	17 October 1984	SW9210846847; 50°17′06″N 4°55′10″W	1141133	Upload Photo
The Left Round House and adjoining wall to west side	Veryan Green, Veryan	House	c.1820	30 May 1967	SW9213940036; 50°13′25″N 4°54′55″W	1291361	The Left Round House and adjoining wall to west side
The Lighthouse	St Agnes, Isles of Scilly	Lighthouse	c.1680	6 April 1959	SV8802008202; 49°53′33″N 6°20′44″W	1328835	The Lighthouse More images
The Manor Office	Marazion	House	c.1775	9 October 1987	SW5173030793; 50°07′31″N 5°28′29″W	1143767	The Manor Office
The Mansion House and attached forecourt railings	Truro	Town house	c.1760	29 December 1950	SW8274344787; 50°15′47″N 5°02′59″W	1280474	The Mansion House and attached forecourt railings
The Old Church of St Mary	Old Town, St. Mary's, Isles of Scilly	Church	12th century	6 April 1959	SV9110910045; 49°54′38″N 6°18′14″W	1141210	The Old Church of St Mary More images
The Old College, outbuilding adjoining left gable end of college, wall adjoining right front of college	Week St Mary	House	1508	29 September 1961	SX2381097674; 50°45′07″N 4°29′57″W	1142422	Upload Photo
The Old Guildhall (now Museum)	East Looe, Looe	Guildhall	16th century	19 March 1951	SX2559253213; 50°21′11″N 4°27′11″W	1201113	The Old Guildhall (now Museum) More images
The Old Harbour pier and walls	Newlyn, Penzance	Harbour	Before 1435	29 July 1950	SW4647628515; 50°06′09″N 5°32′48″W	1143190	The Old Harbour pier and walls
The Old Manor House	St Austell	House	Late 17th century	28 November 1950	SX0136252480; 50°20′19″N 4°47′34″W	1212189	The Old Manor House More images
The Old Manor House or Chy-an-eglos and stables at rear	Marazion	Town house	c.1775	9 October 1987	SW5199030600; 50°07′25″N 5°28′16″W	1159421	Upload Photo
The Old Rectory	St Mawgan, Mawgan-in-Pydar	House	1858	12 May 1988	SW8748965920; 50°27′16″N 4°59′42″W	1312299	Upload Photo
The Old Rectory	St Columb Major	Bishops palace	1851	16 April 1986	SW9117063919; 50°26′16″N 4°56′32″W	1144096	Upload Photo
The Old Standard	Mousehole, Penzance	House	Early 17th century	8 April 1970	SW4690226275; 50°04′57″N 5°32′21″W	1327838	The Old Standard
The Old Town Hall	Falmouth	Town hall	18th century	10 September 1968	SW8060833130; 50°09′27″N 5°04′22″W	1270068	The Old Town Hall More images
The Post Office and dwelling house adjoining at south, the Drangway and part of passage to the east between Church Sq and Gibraltar Sq	Stratton, Bude–Stratton	House	16th century	5 March 1952	SS2309606445; 50°49′50″N 4°30′48″W	1328514	Upload Photo
The Prospect Tower	Calstock	Tower	Late 18th century	19 October 1987	SX4219868926; 50°29′56″N 4°13′35″W	1311985	The Prospect Tower More images
The Rectory	St Just in Roseland	Vicarage	Mid-18th century	30 May 1967	SW8479835631; 50°10′54″N 5°00′56″W	1328968	Upload Photo
The Right Round House	Veryan Green, Veryan	House	c.1820	30 May 1967	SW9213140050; 50°13′26″N 4°54′56″W	1291360	The Right Round House More images
The Round House	Sennen Cove, Sennen	Capstan house	Possibly 18th century	15 December 1988	SW3507726309; 50°04′40″N 5°42′15″W	1143807	The Round House More images
The Sentry Box	St Michael's Mount	Wall	15th century	9 October 1987	SW5142729880; 50°07′01″N 5°28′43″W	1327573	The Sentry Box More images
The Ship Inn	Fowey	Merchant's house	15th century	13 March 1951	SX1256151674; 50°20′06″N 4°38′07″W	1210721	The Ship Inn More images
The Stables	Prideaux Place, Padstow	Stables	Probably 18th century	24 April 1953	SW9135775628; 50°32′35″N 4°56′46″W	1212011	The Stables
The Storehouse, Pendennis Castle	Pendennis Castle, Falmouth	Storehouse	Early 18th century	21 January 1973	SW8232831898; 50°08′50″N 5°02′53″W	1270101	The Storehouse, Pendennis Castle
The Town Hall, Museum and attached walls and railings	Penryn	Town hall	18th century	28 January 1949	SW7848834403; 50°10′05″N 5°06′12″W	1280314	The Town Hall, Museum and attached walls and railings More images
The Union Hotel	Penzance	Assembly rooms	1791	29 July 1950	SW4733430204; 50°07′05″N 5°32′09″W	1143962	The Union Hotel More images
The Viaduct	Calstock	Railway viaduct	1908	23 January 1968	SX4336068658; 50°29′48″N 4°12′36″W	1138329	The Viaduct More images
The Vicarage	Morwenstow	House	1837	29 September 1961	SS2058815362; 50°54′35″N 4°33′12″W	1141780	The Vicarage More images
The Vicarage	Penzance	Vicarage	1701	29 July 1950	SW4746630054; 50°07′00″N 5°32′02″W	1143152	Upload Photo
The White Hart Hotel	Hayle	Public house	c.1838	14 January 1988	SW5586137095; 50°11′00″N 5°25′16″W	1310761	The White Hart Hotel More images
Threshing barn and horse engine house 12m east of Radford Farmhouse	Werrington	Horse engine house	Early 19th century	11 February 1988	SX3182789023; 50°40′35″N 4°22′54″W	1142850	Upload Photo
Threshing barn on north side of yard at Trebartha Barton	Trebartha, North Hill	Barn	c.Mid-19th century	10 May 1989	SX2658277855; 50°34′29″N 4°27′02″W	1250152	Upload Photo
Timber-cutting building and office about 20m south of Count House at King Edward Mine	Camborne	Storehouse	1900–09	12 September 1989	SW6633938917; 50°12′15″N 5°16′33″W	1159182	Upload Photo
Tor House and terrace walls and piers	Torpoint	House	1792	6 February 1974	SX4389755051; 50°22′29″N 4°11′48″W	1162315	Tor House and terrace walls and piers
Tower about 15m west of St Benet's Abbey	Lanivet	Tower	15th century	6 June 1969	SX0380163642; 50°26′23″N 4°45′52″W	1158186	Tower about 15m west of St Benet's Abbey More images
Tower of former Church of Saint Kea	Old Kea, Kea	Tower	15th century	30 May 1967	SW8442341701; 50°14′09″N 5°01′28″W	1141656	Tower of former Church of Saint Kea More images
Town Hall	St Columb Major	Town hall	1848	10 February 1967	SW9131663618; 50°26′07″N 4°56′24″W	1144107	Upload Photo
Town Lodge	St Germans	Lodge	c.1840	23 January 1968	SX3586057753; 50°23′48″N 4°18′39″W	1311300	Town Lodge More images
Trebarfoote Manor including barn adjoining at north-east	Trebarfoote Manor, Poundstock	Farmhouse	Early 17th century	26 September 1951	SX1864099202; 50°45′50″N 4°34′23″W	1231610	Upload Photo
Trebartha Barton and service range to east	Trebartha, North Hill	Farmhouse	Late 18th or early 19th century	10 May 1989	SX2657377810; 50°34′27″N 4°27′02″W	1250150	Upload Photo
Trebrea Lodge and flanking pavilions	Tintagel	House	Probably mid-17th century	17 December 1962	SX0696887610; 50°39′22″N 4°43′56″W	1267415	Upload Photo
Tredown Farmhouse	South Petherwin	Farmhouse	Late 15th or early 16th century	17 October 1983	SX3027782613; 50°37′06″N 4°24′02″W	1303487	Upload Photo
Tredrea Manor Farmhouse including garden wall and railings at front	St Erth	Manor house	17th century	14 January 1988	SW5436534786; 50°09′44″N 5°26′26″W	1160602	Upload Photo
Treduan Farmhouse	St Germans	Farmhouse	Early 17th century	27 June 1977	SX3445559929; 50°24′57″N 4°19′53″W	1158784	Upload Photo
Treffry Farmhouse	Lanhydrock	Farmhouse	c.1710	15 April 1988	SX0785363717; 50°26′30″N 4°42′27″W	1143088	Upload Photo
Tregaminion Church	Polkerris, Fowey	Church	Early 19th century	7 October 1986	SX0967051911; 50°20′11″N 4°40′33″W	1212500	Tregaminion Church More images
Tregarden	St Mabyn	House	1631	4 November 1988	SX0292472922; 50°31′22″N 4°46′54″W	1143003	Tregarden More images
Tregembo Farmhouse	St Hilary	Farmhouse	17th century	9 October 1987	SW5699431781; 50°08′10″N 5°24′07″W	1310348	Upload Photo
Tregithew Farmhouse	Manaccan	Farmhouse	17th century	10 July 1957	SW7519824669; 50°04′46″N 5°08′36″W	1158239	Tregithew Farmhouse
Treglith Farmhouse	Treneglos	House	Early 17th century	1 December 1951	SX2140788972; 50°40′23″N 4°31′44″W	1161194	Upload Photo
Tregrehan House and attached steps and parterre walls with urns	St Blaise	Country house	1689	28 November 1950	SX0516253542; 50°20′58″N 4°44′24″W	1212091	Tregrehan House and attached steps and parterre walls with urns More images
Treguddick	South Petherwin	Farmhouse	Late 16th century	1 December 1951	SX2787782143; 50°36′49″N 4°26′03″W	1142741	Treguddick More images
Tregunnick Farmhouse	Deviock	Farmhouse	Probably late 15th/early 16th century	21 July 1951	SX3090155352; 50°22′25″N 4°22′46″W	1140541	Upload Photo
Trekelland Bridge	South Petherwin, Lewannick	Road bridge	Probably 1504	25 February 1991	SX3004479845; 50°35′37″N 4°24′09″W	1155188	Trekelland Bridge More images
Trekelland Bridge	River Inney, Lewannick	Road bridge	Probably 1504	1 December 1951	SX3004479846; 50°35′37″N 4°24′09″W	1277714	Trekelland Bridge More images
Trelawne House	Pelynt	House	1450s	27 August 1952	SX2199453953; 50°21′31″N 4°30′14″W	1140729	Trelawne House More images
Trelissick House and walls surrounding	Trelissick, Feock	Country house	c.1750	28 February 1952	SW8375539518; 50°12′58″N 5°01′57″W	1159398	Trelissick House and walls surrounding More images
Trelissick Manor House, Farmhouse and Cottage, including front and rear garden wall, summerhouse, gate piers and gate	St Erth	Farmhouse	Remodelled 1668	14 January 1988	SW5558435946; 50°10′23″N 5°25′28″W	1327629	Upload Photo
Treludick	Egloskerry	House	Late 16th century	1 December 1951	SX2538788129; 50°40′00″N 4°28′20″W	1142950	Upload Photo
Trenearne	Trenearne, Padstow	Farmhouse	c.Early 17th century	24 April 1953	SW8908174820; 50°32′06″N 4°58′40″W	1211508	Upload Photo
Treneere Manor	Heamoor, Penzance	Country house	1758	7 February 1974	SW4677131265; 50°07′38″N 5°32′40″W	1143271	Treneere Manor More images
Trereife Manor	Stable Hobba, Penzance	House	17th/18th century	29 July 1950	SW4520629581; 50°06′41″N 5°33′55″W	1210364	Trereife Manor More images
Trerithick and garden walls to front	Altarnun	House	16th century	1 December 1951	SX2478982125; 50°36′45″N 4°28′40″W	1328056	Upload Photo
Treslea Cross	Treslea, Cardinham	Cross	Probably pre-Conquest	6 June 1969	SX1305168862; 50°29′23″N 4°38′13″W	1138292	Treslea Cross More images
Tresungers	St Endellion	House	c.1660	25 October 1951	SX0068479170; 50°34′41″N 4°49′00″W	1320611	Tresungers More images
Tretawn	St Kew	House	c.Late 16th century	25 October 1951	SX0393875750; 50°32′55″N 4°46′08″W	1129869	Upload Photo
Tretheague House including ice house, well, closet and walled garden at rear	Tretheague, Stithians	Country house	Early 18th century	17 June 1988	SW7287936190; 50°10′56″N 5°10′58″W	1328463	Upload Photo
Trethennal Manor Farmhouse and adjoining wall, gate piers and mounting block	Veryan	Farmhouse	17th century	27 November 1985	SW9331940038; 50°13′27″N 4°53′56″W	1141044	Upload Photo
Trethevy Farmhouse	St Cleer	Farmhouse	Late 16th/early 17th century	5 November 1987	SX2633968876; 50°29′38″N 4°26′59″W	1159487	Trethevy Farmhouse
Trethin	Advent	House	c.Late 16th/early 17th century	19 January 1952	SX1040881914; 50°36′22″N 4°40′51″W	1142720	Trethin More images
Trevego	St Winnow	Farmhouse	Late 16th century	30 April 1985	SX1383259863; 50°24′33″N 4°37′17″W	1329287	Upload Photo
Trevelloe House	Paul	Country house	1911	15 December 1988	SW4451526287; 50°04′54″N 5°34′21″W	1143918	Upload Photo
Trevelver and arch reset in wall on north-east	St Minver Highlands	Farmhouse	c.Late 16th or early 17th century	25 October 1951	SW9588475004; 50°32′21″N 4°52′55″W	1211636	Trevelver and arch reset in wall on north-east More images
Treveor Farmhouse with attached front wall and gateway	St Stephen-in-Brannel	Farmhouse	Early 17th century	20 December 1988	SW9496453597; 50°20′47″N 4°53′00″W	1312571	Upload Photo
Treverbyn Old Bridge	St Cleer	Bridge	1412–13	21 August 1964	SX2063867444; 50°28′45″N 4°31′46″W	1159878	Treverbyn Old Bridge More images
Treverbyn Vean	Two Waters Foot, St Neot	House	c.1858–62	5 November 1987	SX1845765168; 50°27′29″N 4°33′32″W	1140489	Upload Photo
Treverran	Tywardreath, Tywardreath and Par	House	Early 18th century	11 March 1974	SX0955556377; 50°22′35″N 4°40′47″W	1212514	Upload Photo
Treviades Barton including garden area walls adjoining south	Treviades, Constantine	Farmhouse	Late 16th century	10 October 1985	SW7478928811; 50°07′00″N 5°09′06″W	1236766	Upload Photo
Trevider Farmhouse including front garden walls	St Buryan	Farmhouse	17th century	15 December 1988	SW4309126249; 50°04′51″N 5°35′33″W	1143899	Upload Photo
Trevithick's Cottage	Penponds, Camborne	Farmhouse	18th century	29 October 1965	SW6373638908; 50°12′11″N 5°18′44″W	1310895	Upload Photo
Trevoyan Farmhouse	Trevoyan, St Merryn	Farmhouse	Late 16th century or earlier	20 May 1988	SW8695472518; 50°30′49″N 5°00′23″W	1212746	Upload Photo
Trewan Hall with attached garden walls	St Columb Major	House	1635	7 January 1952	SW9115664688; 50°26′41″N 4°56′34″W	1144124	Trewan Hall with attached garden walls More images
Trewane	St Kew	House	Possibly early 17th century	25 October 1951	SX0403178583; 50°34′27″N 4°46′08″W	1290773	Upload Photo
Trewardale	Blisland	House	1773	6 June 1969	SX1034971611; 50°30′49″N 4°40′35″W	1311725	Upload Photo
Trewardreva House	Trewardreva, Constantine	Country house	c.1600	10 July 1957	SW7260930164; 50°07′40″N 5°10′58″W	1311177	Upload Photo
Trewince House	Gerrans	Country house	Mid-18th century	30 May 1967	SW8674033827; 50°09′58″N 4°59′15″W	1141017	Upload Photo
Trewinnard Manor Farmhouse, including garden walls and gate piers adjoining to north	St Erth	Manor house	Early 18th century	14 January 1988	SW5461234010; 50°09′19″N 5°26′12″W	1143620	Upload Photo
Trewitten	Trewitten, Trevalga	House	c.Early 17th century	20 July 1987	SX0896788702; 50°40′00″N 4°42′17″W	1143418	Upload Photo
Trewornan including wall to rear of courtyard	St Minver Highlands	Manor house	c.Early 17th century	26 June 1987	SW9853074424; 50°32′05″N 4°50′40″W	1124739	Upload Photo
Trinity Methodist Chapel	Newlyn, Penzance	Wesleyan Methodist chapel	1834	14 April 1999	SW4619428830; 50°06′19″N 5°33′03″W	1386515	Trinity Methodist Chapel
Triumphal Arch at Higher Lodge	Mount Edgcumbe Country Park, Maker-with-Rame	Arch	c.1790	23 January 1968	SX4490752930; 50°21′21″N 4°10′54″W	1310227	Triumphal Arch at Higher Lodge More images
Truthall	Sithney	Cruck house	c.Late 15th century	10 July 1957	SW6545930211; 50°07′32″N 5°16′58″W	1142177	Truthall More images
Tudor Block House	Mount Edgcumbe Country Park, Maker-with-Rame	Blockhouse	c.1540	23 January 1968	SX4561153173; 50°21′29″N 4°10′18″W	1161267	Tudor Block House
Tullimaar	Perranarworthal	Country house	c.1828	30 May 1967	SW7824838853; 50°12′29″N 5°06′33″W	1161008	Upload Photo
Two statues on terraces 100m south of Newton Ferrers House	Newton Ferrers, St Mellion	Statue	Probably 18th century	26 November 1985	SX3465165833; 50°28′08″N 4°19′53″W	1137482	Upload Photo
Unidentified monument in the churchyard about 1m south of south aisle of Church of St Nivet	Lanivet	Tombstone	Probably 10th century	15 April 1988	SX0394564197; 50°26′41″N 4°45′46″W	1143068	Upload Photo
Viaduct about 180m north-east of Woolston Farmhouse	Poundstock	Railway viaduct	1898	9 September 1985	SS2283102107; 50°47′29″N 4°30′54″W	1328572	Viaduct about 180m north-east of Woolston Farmhouse
Moorswater Viaduct including adjacent piers to earlier viaduct	Moorswater, Dobwalls and Trewidland	Railway viaduct	1859	26 November 1985	SX2367563957; 50°26′56″N 4°29′06″W	1312723	Moorswater Viaduct including adjacent piers to earlier viaduct More images
Viaduct including adjacent Piers to earlier Viaduct (that Part in Liskeard CP)	Moorswater, Liskeard	Railway viaduct	1881	22 July 1981	SX2382163972; 50°26′57″N 4°28′59″W	1203142	Viaduct including adjacent Piers to earlier Viaduct (that Part in Liskeard CP) More images
Vogue Beloth Methodist Church with forecourt walls and railings	Illogan	Methodist church	1866	12 September 1989	SW6771143426; 50°14′42″N 5°15′34″W	1161246	Vogue Beloth Methodist Church with forecourt walls and railings
Wadebridge Bridge	Wadebridge	Road bridge	c.1468	6 June 1969	SW9913172464; 50°31′03″N 4°50′05″W	1142975	Wadebridge Bridge More images
Walled garden and pavilions to west of gatehouse and Penheale Manor	Penheale, Egloskerry	Garden wall	18th century	11 January 1989	SX2680788028; 50°39′58″N 4°27′08″W	1365636	Upload Photo
Walls and gates enclosing the garden to east and north of Lanhydrock House	Lanhydrock Park, Lanhydrock	Garden wall	1857	15 April 1988	SX0864063627; 50°26′28″N 4°41′47″W	1143090	Walls and gates enclosing the garden to east and north of Lanhydrock House More images
Walls at Place House	Fowey	Gate	15th/16th century	11 March 1974	SX1250751723; 50°20′08″N 4°38′10″W	1144302	Upload Photo
Warehouse	Perran Wharf, Mylor	Iron foundry	c.Mid-19th century	30 May 1967	SW7756038479; 50°12′16″N 5°07′07″W	1141642	Upload Photo
Well House about 4m east of the Old College	Week St Mary	Well house	c.1508	12 October 1984	SX2381797683; 50°45′07″N 4°29′56″W	1142423	Upload Photo
Well of St Guron, about 1m west of west end of Church of St Petroc	Bodmin	Well head	15th century	8 June 1972	SX0728867037; 50°28′17″N 4°43′02″W	1355184	Well of St Guron, about 1m west of west end of Church of St Petroc More images
Welltown Manor	Forrabury and Minster	House	Possibly c.early 16th century	19 January 1952	SX0882490348; 50°40′53″N 4°42′27″W	1239319	Upload Photo
Wesleyan Chapel	Porkellis, Wendron	Chapel	1866	17 June 1988	SW6910433430; 50°09′21″N 5°14′02″W	1162569	Upload Photo
Wesleyan Chapel and attached schoolrooms	St. Austell Bay	Methodist Church	1827	11 March 1974	SX0377851807; 50°20′00″N 4°45′31″W	1144292	Wesleyan Chapel and attached schoolrooms More images
West Penwith RDC offices including railings	Penzance	Local government office	Dated 1834	7 February 1974	SW4749330077; 50°07′01″N 5°32′01″W	1143157	West Penwith RDC offices including railings
Westcott	Linkinhorne	Farmhouse	Late 16th/early 17th century	8 August 1983	SX2942373691; 50°32′17″N 4°24′31″W	1140496	Upload Photo
Westnorth Manor and well house 1m to east	Duloe, Duloe	Farmhouse	c.Late 16th century	18 December 1985	SX2427758057; 50°23′46″N 4°28′25″W	1140260	Upload Photo
Wetherham	St Tudy	House	Probably late 17th/early 18th century	4 November 1988	SX0573475652; 50°32′54″N 4°44′36″W	1142982	Upload Photo
Wheal Busy Chapel and attached walls, gate-piers and railings	Wheal Busy, Chacewater	Chapel	1863	14 April 1999	SW7382445238; 50°15′49″N 5°10′30″W	1386521	Wheal Busy Chapel and attached walls, gate-piers and railings
Winding Engine House at south-east corner of King Edward Mine	Camborne	Engine house	Late 19th century	12 September 1989	SW6640438895; 50°12′14″N 5°16′30″W	1159235	Winding Engine House at south-east corner of King Edward Mine
Winnacott Farmhouse and garden wall to front	North Petherwin	House	16th century	11 January 1989	SX2586390135; 50°41′05″N 4°27′59″W	1160463	Upload Photo
World War II tunnels at Porthcurno Telegraph Station	Porthcurno	Tunnel	Cut 1940–41	17 September 2008	SW3844122742; 50°02′50″N 5°39′18″W	1392862	World War II tunnels at Porthcurno Telegraph Station
Worthyvale Manor and garden wall to front	Worthyvale Manor, Forrabury and Minster	Cross-passage house	Early 17th century	19 January 1952	SX1077086017; 50°38′35″N 4°40′40″W	1143494	Worthyvale Manor and garden wall to front
Ye Old Cottage	East Looe, Looe	Jettied house	Mid-16th century	19 March 1951	SX2553653248; 50°21′12″N 4°27′14″W	1280647	Ye Old Cottage More images

== See also ==
- Grade I listed buildings in Cornwall
- Grade II* listed buildings in Cornwall
  - Grade II* listed buildings in Cornwall (A–G)
  - Grade II* listed buildings in Cornwall (H–P)
