= St Hydroc's Church, Lanhydrock =

Coordinates: 50°26′27.22″N 4°41′58.89″W

St Hydroc’s Church, Lanhydrock
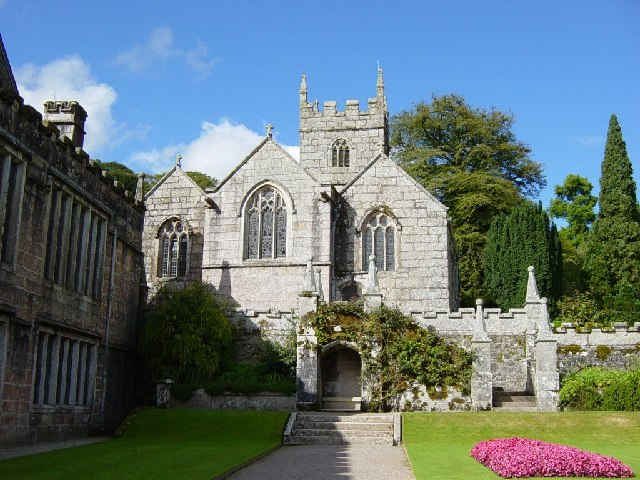
- St Hydroc’s Church, Lanhydrock

- Location: Lanhydrock
- Country: England
- Denomination: Church of England

History
- Dedication: St Hydroc

Administration
- Province: Province of Canterbury
- Diocese: Diocese of Truro
- Archdeaconry: Bodmin
- Deanery: Trigg Minor and Bodmin
- Parish: Lanhydrock

Listed Building – Grade I
- Official name: Church of St Hydroc
- Designated: 6 June 1969
- Reference no.: 1158013

St Hydroc's Church, Lanhydrock is a Grade I listed in the Church of England in Lanhydrock, Cornwall.

== History ==
The church dates from the 15th century. Sir Richard Robartes, 1st Baronet made some alterations around The church was restored and the chancel extended between 1886 and 1888. The church was re-opened on 3 October 1888.

== Parish status ==
The church is in a joint parish with

- St Petroc's Church, Bodmin
- Lanivet Church
- St Stephen's Church, Nanstallon

== Organ ==
The church contained a pipe organ built by Henry Willis in 1894 for the great music room in Lanhydrock House. A specification of the organ can be found on the National Pipe Organ Register. It was moved to the church in the 1930s, but was later transferred to St Cuthbert's Church, Cubert. There is now an electronic organ.

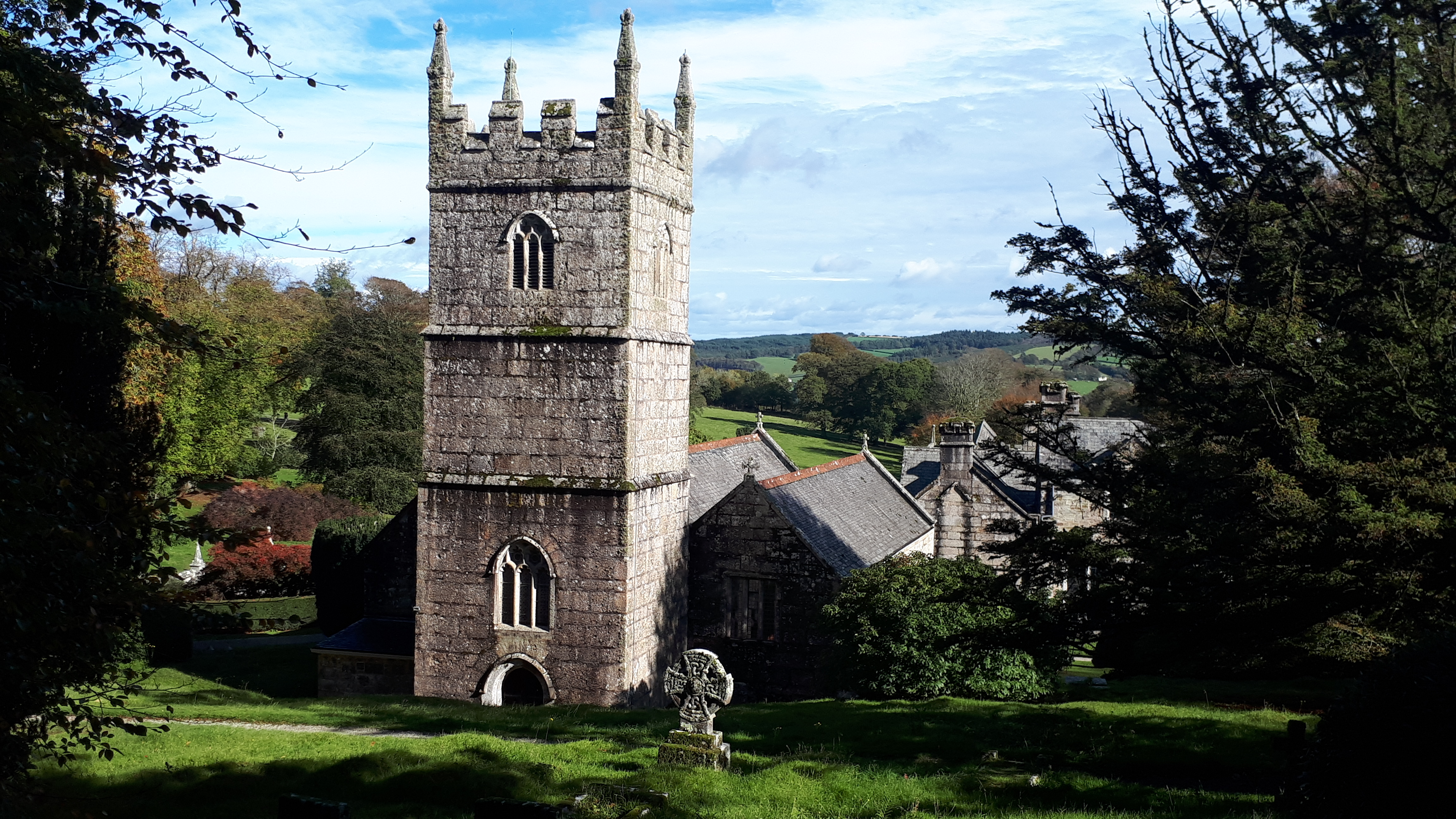
View on Lanhydrock Church and House
