= St Winnow =

Civil parish in Cornwall, England

Coordinates: 50.383°N 4.652°W

St Winnow: Cornish: Sen Gwynnek
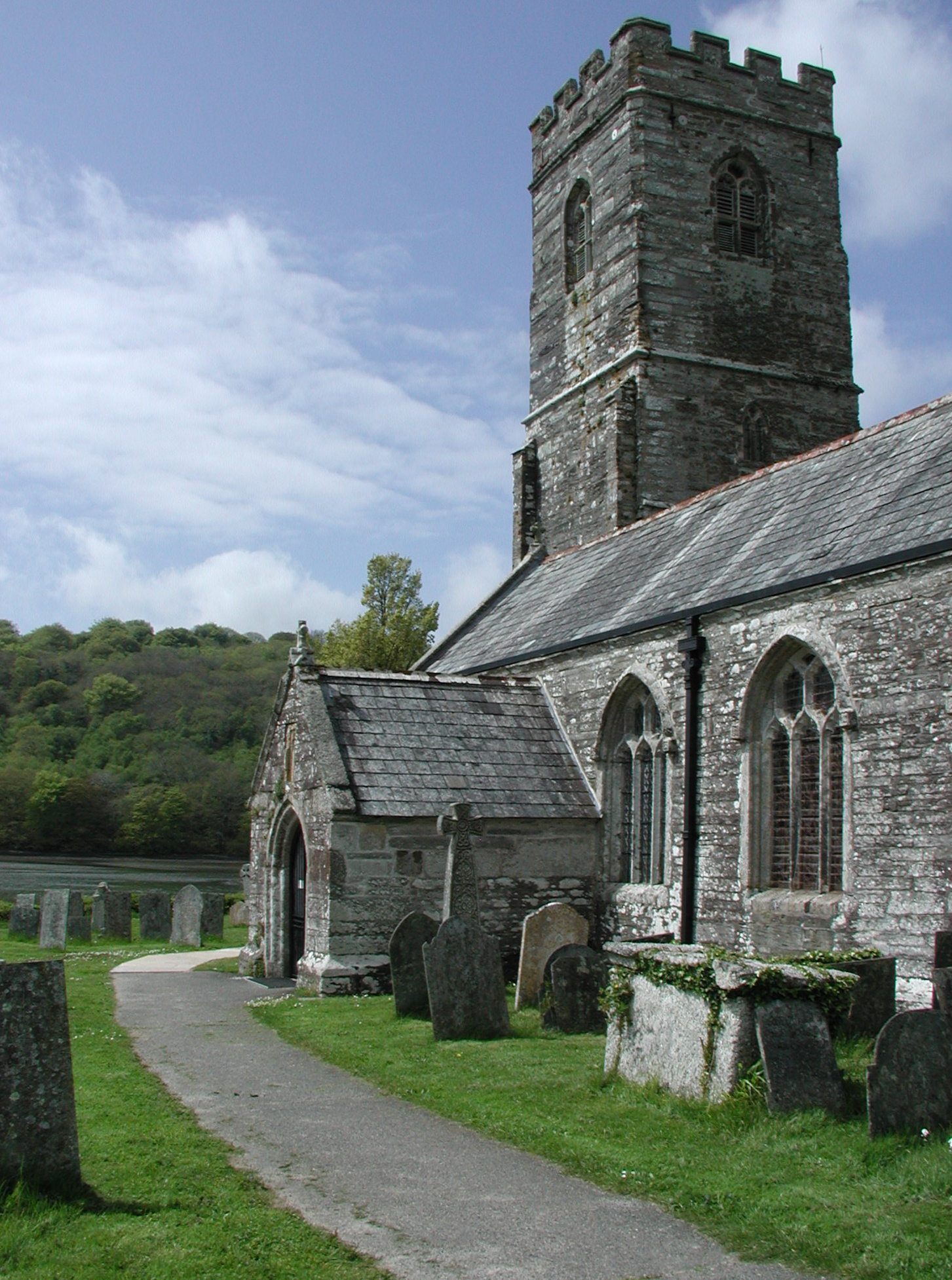
- St Winnow Parish Church

- Location within Cornwall
- Population: 312 (United Kingdom Census 2011 including Braddock)
- OS grid reference: SX1157
- Civil parish: St Winnow
- Unitary authority: Cornwall Council
- Ceremonial county: Cornwall
- Region: South West
- Country: England
- Sovereign state: United Kingdom
- Post town: LOSTWITHIEL
- Postcode district: PL22
- Dialling code: 01208
- Police: Devon and Cornwall
- Fire: Cornwall
- Ambulance: South Western
- UK Parliament: South East Cornwall

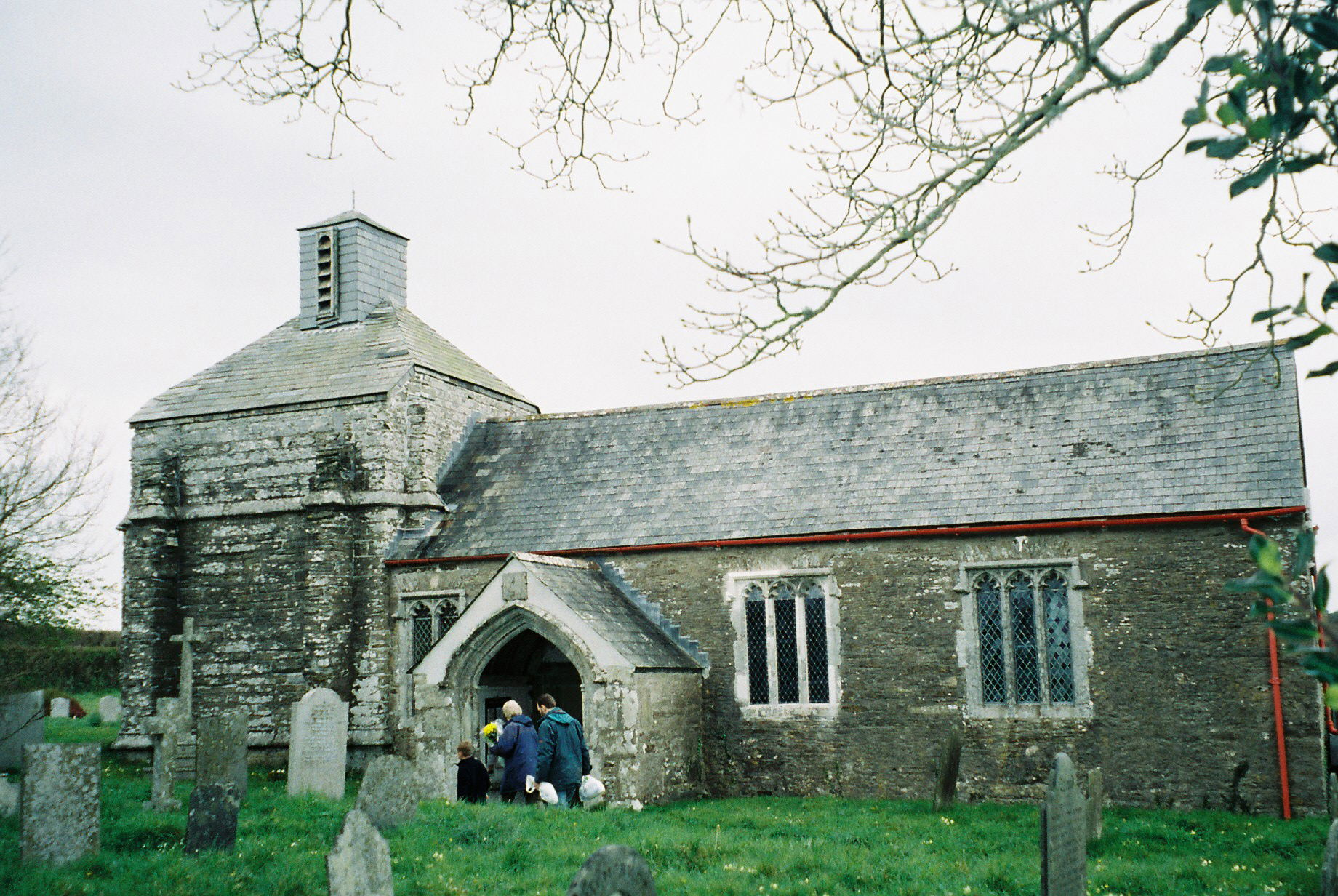
St Nectan's Chapel

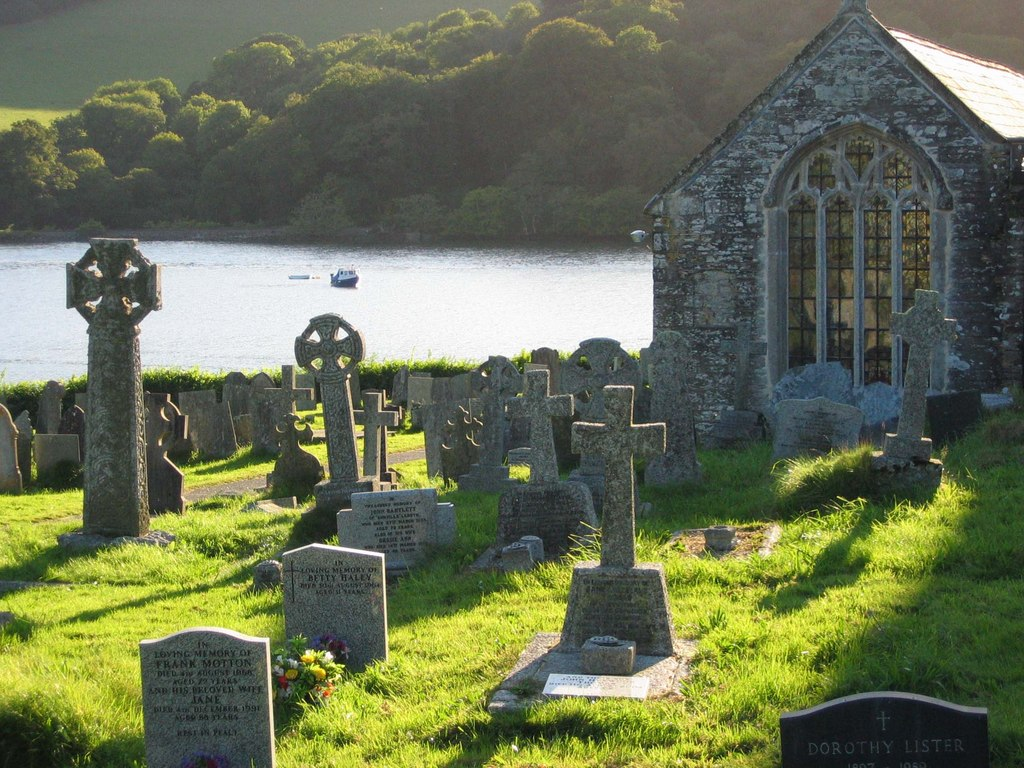
St Winnow churchyard

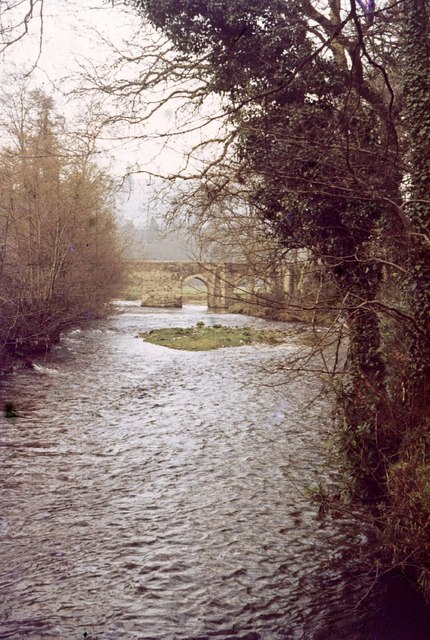
Respryn Bridge over the River Fowey

St Winnow (Cornish: Sen Gwynnek) is a civil parish in Cornwall, England, United Kingdom. Its name may be connected with either that of Saint Winnoc or Saint Winwaloe. It had a population of 304 in 2001, which had increased to 328 at the 2011 census. The church town is on the east bank of the River Fowey south of Lostwithiel. Part of the village of Lerryn lies within the parish as does the Chapel of St Nectan. The Redlake Meadows & Hoggs Moor, a Site of Special Scientific Interest is also in the parish.

== History and antiquities ==
St Winnow was recorded in the Domesday Book of 1086 as San Winnuc. In 1644–45, some ninety people from the parish died of the plague: only four were soldiers but a campaign of the Civil War was going on at the time.

Andrew Langdon (1996) records three stone crosses in the parish. A cross found at Higher Coombe in 1903 was afterwards erected at St Nectan's chapel. A cross from Lanlivery was made into the upper section of "The Monument" on Druids Hill. It was brought from Lanlivery in 1846; this monument commemorates the loss of life in the Battle of Braddock Down in 1643. A third cross called Waterlake Cross stands in a private garden near Respryn. The third cross had already been recorded by Arthur G. Langdon in 1896; at Waterlake, a hamlet near Bodmin Road station, there is a Cornish cross.

== Churches and chapels ==
=== Parish church ===
This is of Norman foundation but the present building is almost entirely of the 15th century. The rood screen survives and there is some interesting stained glass.

The church is at the riverside, next to a quay at the limit of navigation of the River Fowey. It is probably on the site of the 7th century oratory of St Winnoc. A stone church was built in the 12th century, probably cruciform in plan, and there are traces of the Norman stonework on the north side. The transept arch was reconstructed in the 13th century. About 1465 the south wall was demolished and the south aisle, arcade and roofs built. The chancel was restored by J. H. Seddon in the 19th century, retaining the 16th century east window. The west tower is of standard Cornish Perpendicular style. There is stained glass of c. 1500 in the east windows of the chancel and S aisle. The 16th century rood screen, carved with leaves and flowers, was restored by Violet Pinwell in 1907 (by Edmund H. Sedding according to Pevsner). The loft, rood and some of the south aisle screen were newly made in the restoration. The granite font, carved with angels bearing shields, is 14th century. The pulpit is of c.1600 and richly carved. There are also carved bench ends of various dates from 1485 to 1630. The monuments include one in slate to William Sawle, d. 1651.

A burial plot with Celtic-style headstones for the Vivian family occupies the north-west corner of the churchyard.

=== Chapels ===
The chapel of St Nectan is of the 13th and 15th centuries but the north aisle was added in 1825. The tower has lost its upper stages due to the Civil War (1644). The medieval parish was larger and included Boconnoc and St Bradoc: the chapels of St Nectan and St Martin's at Respryn were quasi-parochial. The 14th century font from Respryn was reused at Herodsfoot.

== Education ==
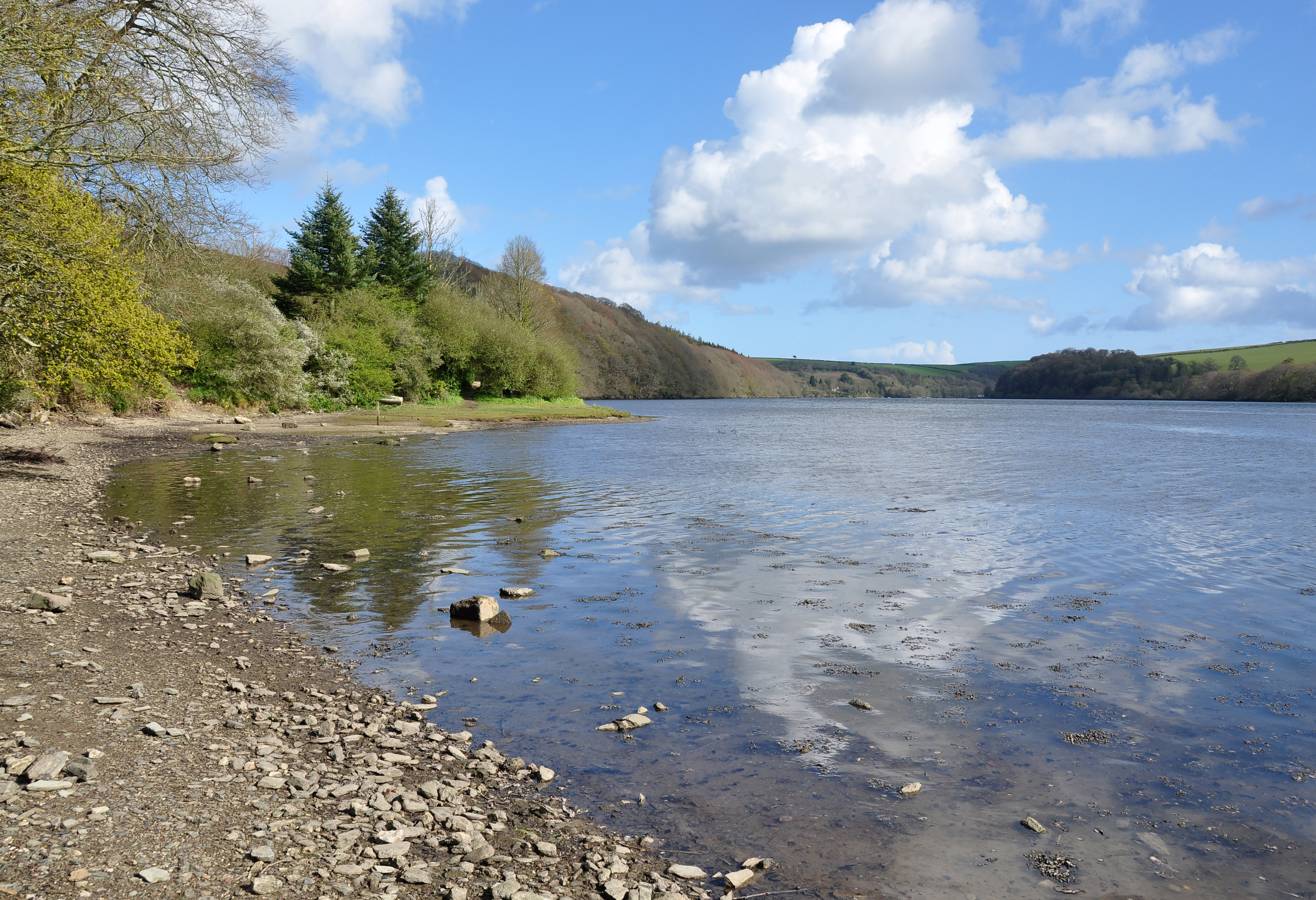
The Fowey estuary at St Winnow

There is a primary school in St Winnow, St Winnow C E School. The majority of children aged between 11 and 16 attend Fowey River Academy.

== Transport ==
Due to delays in securing the site for Bodmin Road, the Cornwall Railway provided a temporary station at Respryn for the opening of the line on 4 May 1859 until the permanent station was ready on 27 June 1859.

Respryn Bridge (illustrated above right) is a fine medieval stone bridge over the River Fowey. The present bridge was built in the 15th century to replace one which had already existed in 1300.
