= Tresean =

Hamlet in Cornwall, England, United Kingdom

Tresean is a hamlet north of Cubert, Cornwall, England, United Kingdom. it is separated from Cubert churchtown by Treveal.
