= St Petroc's Church, Bodmin =

Parish church in Cornwall, England

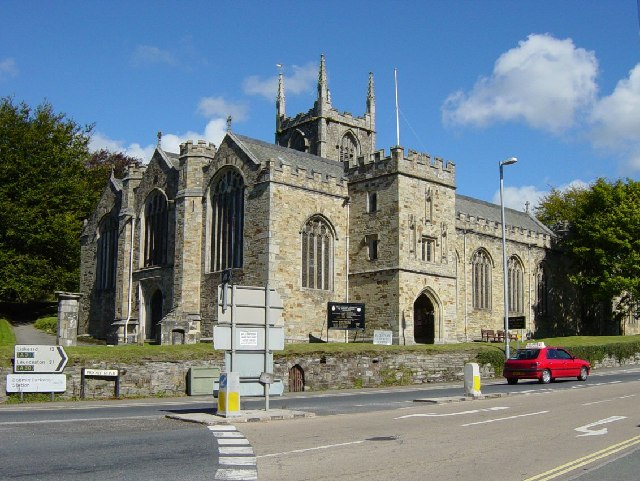
- St Petroc's Church, Bodmin, from the southwest
- St Petroc's Church, Bodmin
- 50.4714°N 4.7168°W
- Denomination: Church of England
- Churchmanship: High

History
- Dedication: St Petroc

Administration
- Province: Canterbury
- Diocese: Truro
- Archdeaconry: Bodmin
- Deanery: Trigg Minor
- Parish: Bodmin

Clergy
- Rector: The Revd Paul Holley, team rector
- Location within Cornwall

Listed Building – Grade I
- Official name: Church of St Petroc
- Designated: 24 March 1949
- Reference no.: 1355166

St Petroc's Church, Bodmin, also known as Bodmin Parish Church, is an Anglican parish church in the town of Bodmin, Cornwall, England, United Kingdom.

The existing church building is dated 1469–1472 and was until the building of Truro Cathedral the largest church in Cornwall. It was originally a Roman Catholic church, but became an Anglican church as a result of the English Reformation. The tower which remains from the original Norman church and stands on the north side of the church (the upper part is 15th century) was until the loss of its spire in 1699 150 feet (45 metres) high. The building underwent two Victorian restorations and another in 1930. It is now listed Grade I. Part of the church is the Regimental Chapel of the Duke of Cornwall's Light Infantry dedicated in 1933.

The parish of Bodmin is now grouped with Cardinham, Lanivet and Lanhydrock parishes. There is a chapel at Nanstallon.

== History ==
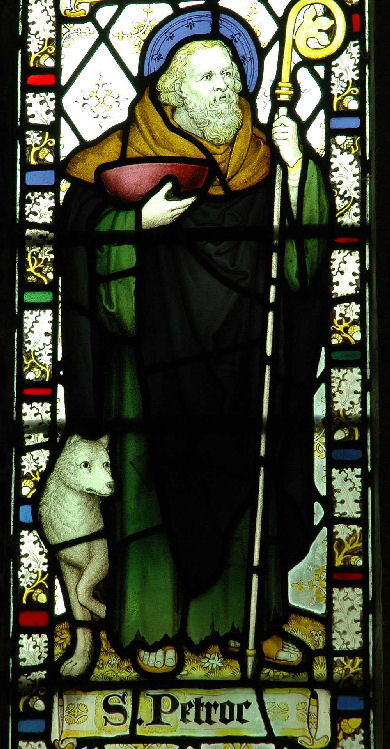
Detail of stained glass window at Bodmin showing St Petroc

The early history of the monastic community of Bodmin is obscure; however the name "Bodmin" derives from the Cornish for "house of the monks" so the use of this name must have followed the establishment of the monastery. According to tradition, after founding a monastery at Padstow, Saint Petroc founded another monastery in Bodmin in the 6th century and gave the town its alternative name of Petrockstow. Around 1155, Hugh Candidus claimed that Bodmin was the resting place of Credan, Medan and Dachuna, whom he identified as associates of Petroc. The legends of St Petroc associate him with monasteries in Padstow and Bodmin; but that at Bodmin may have been founded as a daughter house of Padstow (also called Petrockstow or Aldestow) after his death.

St Guron is said to have preceded him here. The foundation of the monastery is also attributed to King Athelstan though it probably existed before his time, and was destroyed in a Danish raid in 981 AD. It must have been revived since it was a considerable landholder in the reign of Edward the Confessor.

Domesday Book records that parts of its lands had been taken from it by the Count of Mortain while others had been retained. The holdings were mainly in the hundreds of Trigg and Pydar and at the time of Domesday the monastery still held 18 manors, including Bodmin, Padstow and Rialton. These three manors were held by the monastery itself as well as Ellenglaze, Withiel and Treknow; Nancekuke, Tregole and Fursnewth were let to separate tenants and Coswarth was held by the king. Robert, Count of Mortain held from the monastery the manors of Tywarnhayle, Halwyn, Callestick, Cargoll, Treloy, St Enoder and Bossiney; lands in Tregona, Trevornick, Trenhale, Tolcarne, Tremore, Lancarffe and Treninnick were taken from the monastery by Count Robert and in 1086 they were held by his tenants.

William Warelwast, Bishop of Exeter, established a house of regular Augustinian canons here ca. 1120. After St Petroc's relics were stolen in 1177 they were recovered and returned to Prior Roger (the ivory casket in which they were kept has survived to the present day). In the reign of King Henry VIII the priory was suppressed and the site granted to Thomas Sternhold. Until that time the choir had been used by the canons and the nave by the parishioners of Bodmin. In John Leland's Itinerary he records that "monkes, then nunnys, then seculare prestes, then monkes agayne, and last canons regular" had possessed the church. He reports that the priory buildings stood at the east-southeast end of the churchyard. Some fragments of stonework have been found and are preserved at Priory House.

John Wallis

John Wallis was Vicar of Bodmin from 1817 to his death in 1866; he served as mayor of Bodmin in 1822 and was the author of many topographical works. His works include The Cornwall Register: containing collections relative to the past and present state of the 209 parishes, forming the county, archdeaconry, parliamentary divisions, and poor law unions of Cornwall; to which is added a brief view of the adjoining towns and parishes in Devon, from Hartland to Plymouth (Bodmin: printed by Liddell & Son, 1847); which was preceded by The Bodmin Register: containing collections relative to the past and present state of the parish of Bodmin : and also, a statistical view of the twenty-eight parishes within a circle of eight miles round Bodmin church : together with many particulars and statistical tables concerning the county, archdeaconry, parliamentary districts, and poor law unions of Cornwall: with an appendix on the diocese of Exeter &c. (Bodmin: printed by Liddell & Son, 1838).

=== Restoration of 1884 ===
In 1868 Robert Jewell Withers architect of London, was selected to survey and report as to the condition of the building and the probably cost of restoration. Fund raising took many years but the structural work which had cost £1,850 was being completed by late 1884. With other works the total cost amounted to over £3,000 (equivalent to £322,300 in 2025) by the time the Bishop of Truro arrived on Christmas Day to reopen the building for worship. The work which had mainly concentrated on restoring the eastern end was described in the Royal Cornwall Gazette as follows:

To enumerate the principal improvement. The three bays in the east end of the north arcade are completely new, and with the exception of two of painted glass, the whole of the windows are either new or have been completely restored, while two memorial windows have been added, the first being given by the relatives of the late Mr. Robt. Edyvean, and the other by those of the late Captain Wm. Henry Liddlel, R.N. A portion of the ancient oak roof over the east end of the south chancel aisle has been preserved, and with the exception of the other portion of this isle, which has been roofed with oak, the edifice throughout has been new roofed with pitch-pine. The aisles have been taken up and laid with Staffordshire tiles, and the flooring of the church with wood pavement competed. The chancel and sanctuary have been paved with encaustic tiles; new choir stalls have been erected, the latter being the gift of some members of the family of the late vicar (the Rev. C.J. Dickinson); a new altar of cedar wood has been raised at a cost of nearly £80; and the church has been fitted with three of Rimington’s patent apparatus for warming. The altar fittings are all new, the whole having been presented by kind friends. The old organ has been taken down and is to be substituted by a new one in course of erection by Messrs. Hele, of Plymouth, but it is not expected that this will be ready for several months. Meanwhile music is supplied by a powerful American organ. On the whole the church has undergone a complete transformation and been in some measure restored to its original pristine beauty. The work has been carried out in a highly satisfactory manner and reflects the greatest possible credit upon all concerned, of whom special mention may be made of the contractor, Mr. S. Searly of St. Austell. The architect was Mr. R.G. Withers, 11, Adam-street, Adelphi, London, and the clerk of the works Mr. W.H. Buscomb, of Bodmin.

== Parish status ==
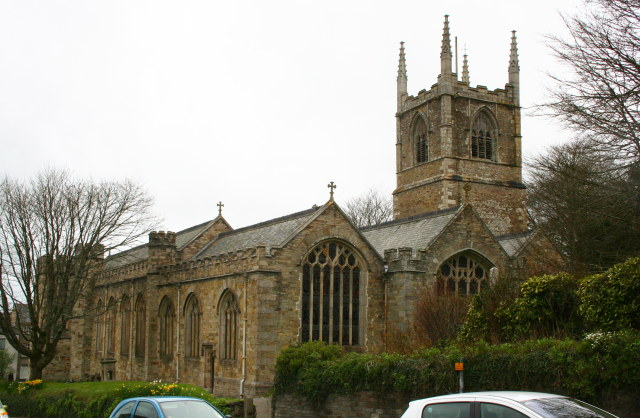
St Petroc's Church from the east

The church is in a joint parish with:

- St Hydroc's Church, Lanhydrock
- Lanivet Church
- St Stephen's Church, Nanstallon (chapel-of-ease)
- St Meubred's Church, Cardynham

== Features of St Petroc's Church ==
There are a number of interesting monuments, including the black Delabole slate memorial to Richard Durant, his wives and twenty children, carved in low relief. There is also a twelfth-century ivory casket which is thought to have once contained relics of St Petroc.

=== Prior Vyvyan's tomb ===
There are a number of interesting monuments, most notably that of Prior Vivian which was formerly in the Priory Church (Thomas Vivian's effigy lying on a chest: black Catacleuse stone and grey marble). Thomas Vyvyan (or Vivian), the penultimate prior of Bodmin Priory, was consecrated bishop of the titular see of Megara in Greece in 1517. As a bishop he could relieve Bishop Oldham of Exeter by acting as his suffragan in the archdeaconry of Cornwall. At Rialton, chief manor of the priory, Prior Vyvyan, a Cornishman, had already built c. 1510 a good residence for himself; parts of this structure are still extant. His tomb was not destroyed at the Reformation but relocated in the parish church.

=== Baptismal font ===
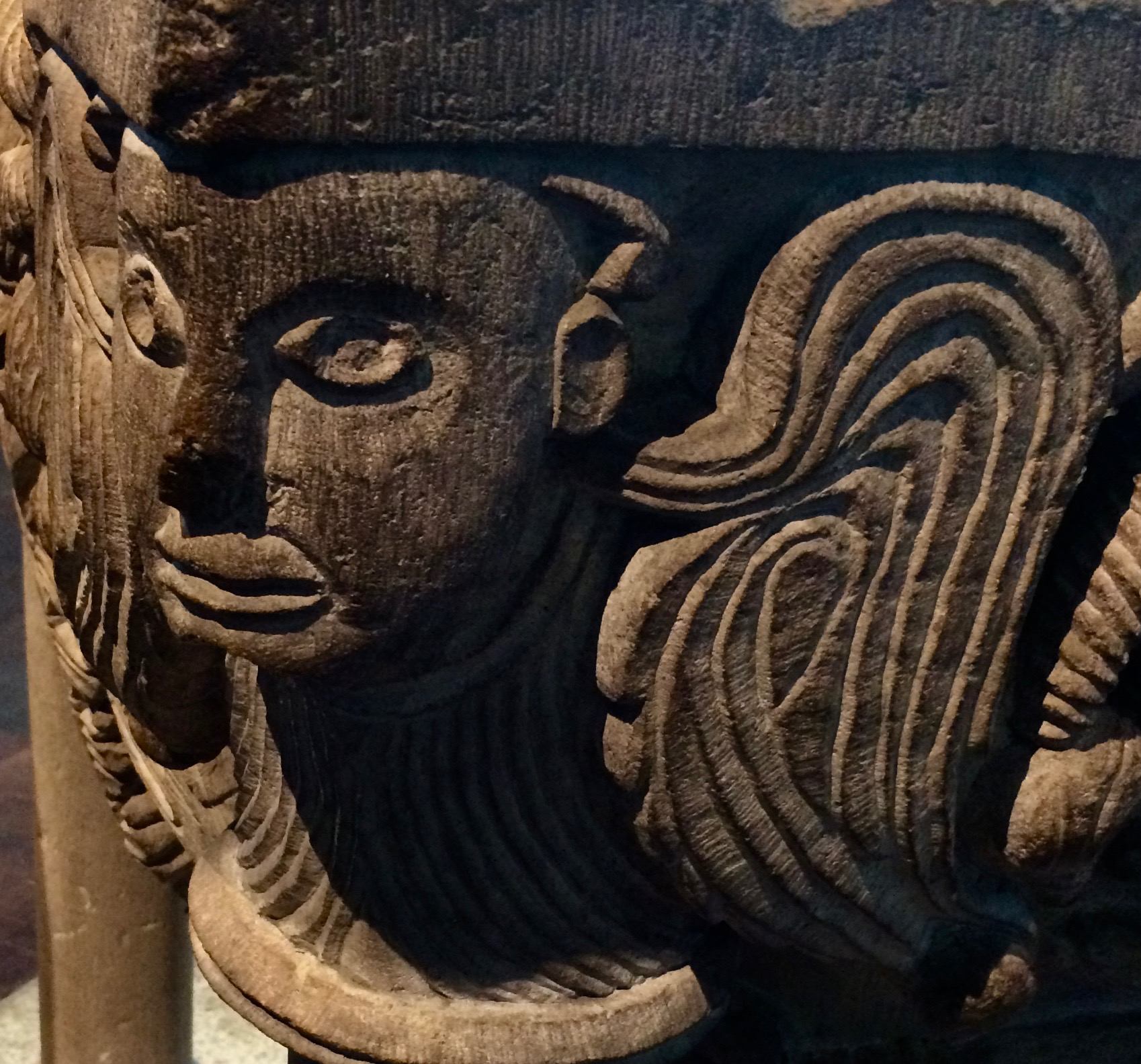
Detail of the font

The font of a type common in Cornwall is of the 12th century: large and finely carved. The type may also be found at Altarnun and elsewhere but Bodmin's font is the largest and most highly ornamented of any of this type.

=== Woodwork ===
Screen, pulpit and bench-ends

In 1491 Matthy More undertook the reseating of the church and the building of the rood screen and pulpit. His work took four years and he was paid "about £400 in our money" (estimated in 1937). Parts of his work survive in the bench-ends and panels of the screen which have been re-used in the Corporation seats, wall panelling, reredos, pulpit and modern screen.

Misericords

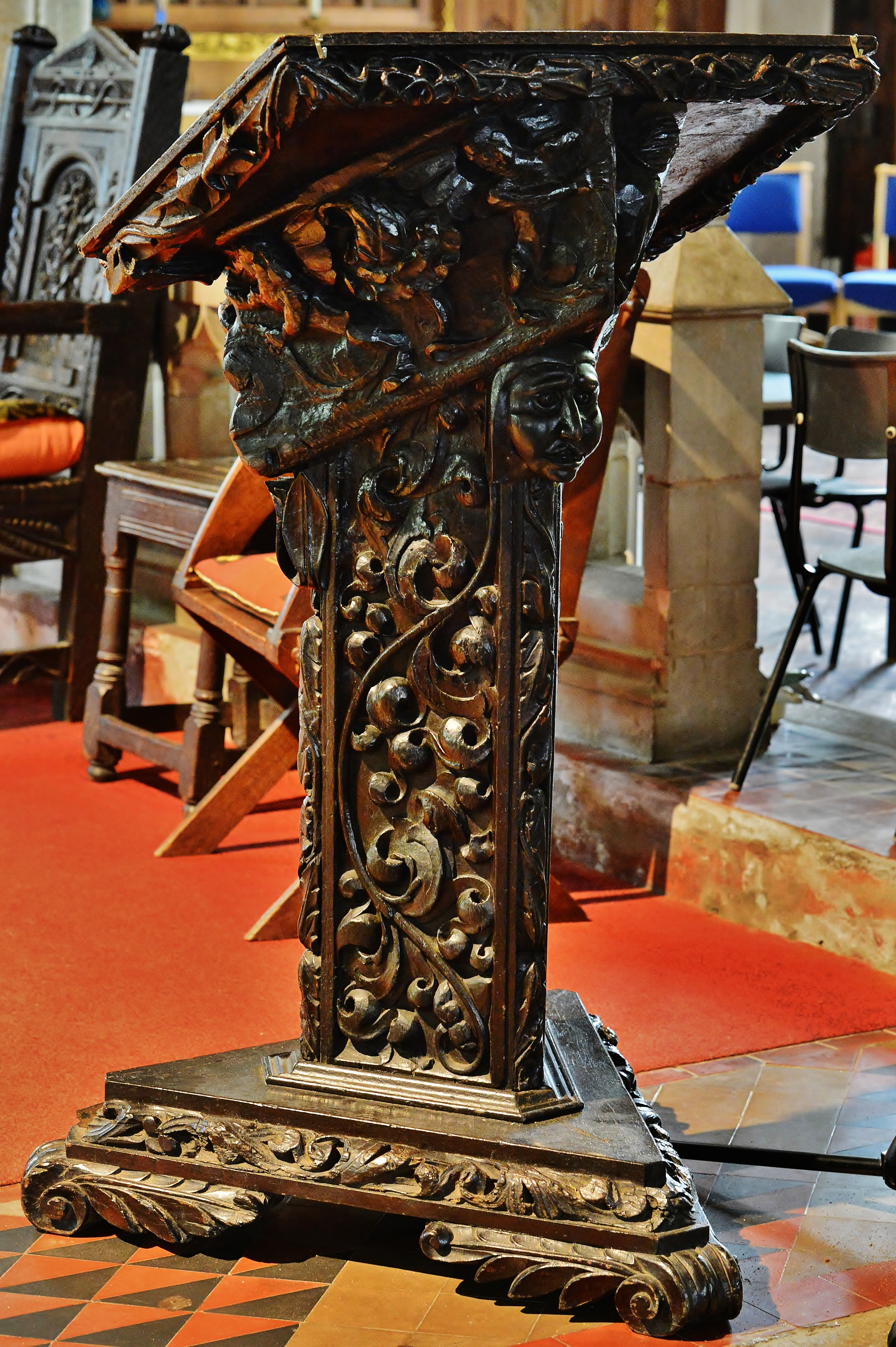
The lectern made from misericords

Unusually, the three, late 15th century misericords have at some point been taken from their original stalls (which may not even have been in St Petroc's) and fitted into the lectern. Although dating evidence is scanty, it is believed that the transfer happened sometime in the 18th century.

== Churchyard ==
The churchyard is extensive and on a slope: the Chapel of St Thomas Becket is a ruin of a 14th-century building in the south-east of the churchyard. St Guron's Well is a small building of granite at the western entrance to the churchyard.

== Bells ==
In the tower there is a peal of eight bells: the tenor bell weighs 17-0-11.

== Organ ==
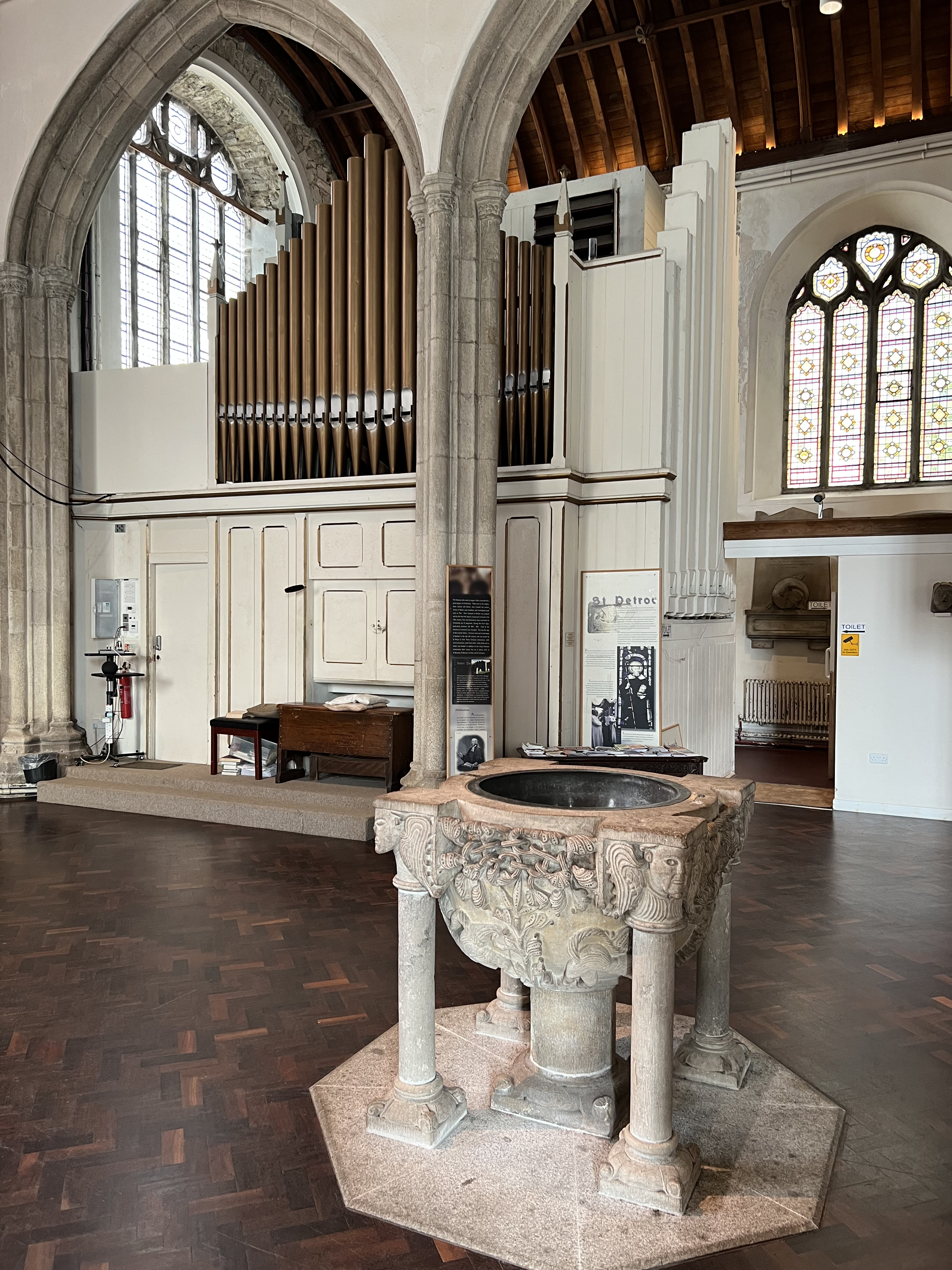
The organ

A three manual organ was installed in 1775 by Brice Seede. It originally stood in a gallery at the western end of the church. Later it was moved to the north chancel aisle. A portion of the organ was used in the nave from 1876.

It was subsequently restored and modified by Hele & Co in 1885, Percy Daniel in 1931 and Hele & Co in 1936. A specification of the organ can be found on the National Pipe Organ Register.

=== Organists ===
- John Lawrence Lutman ca. 1830 - 1862
- Jemima Lutman from 1862
- John Hele 1868 - 1872 (afterwards organist of St Peter’s Church, Plymouth)
- Henry Jacobs ca. 1878 - 1884 (afterwards organist of St Andrew’s Presbyterian Church, Bournemouth)
- Martin Bodinner 1884 - 1885 (formerly organist at St John's Church, Penzance)
- Charles Edward Juleff 1885 - 1888 (formerly organist of Holy Trinity Church, St Austell, afterwards organist at St Michael and All Angels Church, Mount Dinham, Exeter)
- T.S. Kendall 1888 - 1890
- Charles Edward Juleff 1890 - 1895 (afterwards organist at Church of St Fimbarrus, Fowey)
- Walter L. Twinning 1895 - 1903 (formerly organist at Kingsbridge, afterwards organist of St Marychurch, Torquay)
- Arthur Henry Baker 1903 - 1909 (formerly organist of Bovey Tracey Parish Church)
- R. Rashleigh Glendining 1910 - 1914
- Ernest William Baker from 1915
- Alfred Worth 1917 - ca. 1946 (formerly organist of St Tudy)
- Sydney Thomas Hearn from 1946
- Robert E.F. Canham ca. 1960 - ca. 1971
