= Treveal =

Farm in Zennor, Cornwall, England

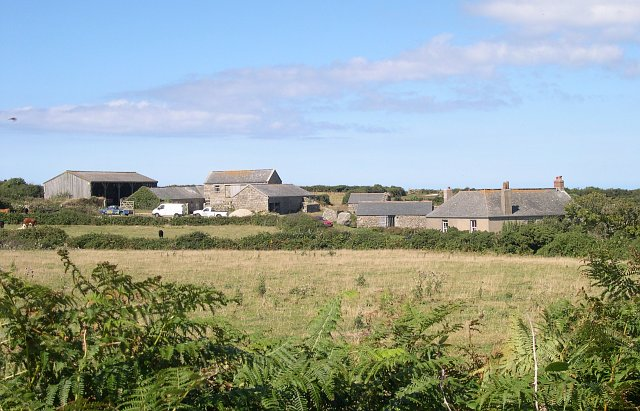
Treveal, Zennor

Treveal is a farm in the parish of Zennor, Cornwall, UK.

Treveal is also a hamlet in the parish of Cubert (Cornwall), between Cubert churchtown and Tresean, where the spelling has recently changed to Trevail to reflect the pronunciation. The Cubert hamlet has the meaning "Mayle's Farm" with attested spellings back to the 14th century.

== See also ==
- List of farms in Cornwall
