= Tregarden =

Grade II* listed large house in St Mabyn, Cornwall, England

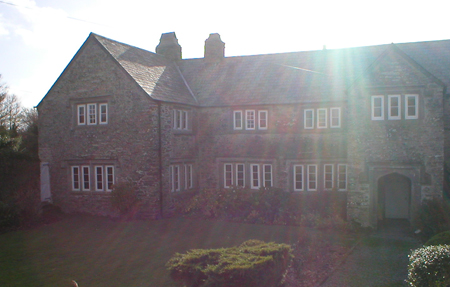

- Location within Cornwall
- 50.522852°N 4.781546°W
- Location: St Mabyn, Cornwall, England

Listed Building – Grade II*
- Official name: Tregarden
- Designated: 4 November 1988
- Reference no.: 1143003

Tregarden is a Grade II* listed large house built by the Barrett family in the late 16th century in the parish of St Mabyn, Cornwall, England.

The house is built to a traditional E-shaped Elizabethan plan. The entrance archway is dated 1631, the date that William Godolphin married the Barrett heiress. The Hearth Tax Returns for 1664 record it as having 8 hearths. The house became a farmhouse in the 19th century. It is currently a restored manor house owned by the Tremayne family.

== The house ==
The entrance archway has an inscription "1631" but it is likely that the house had its origins at an earlier date than that. It is a two-storey house built of rubble stone with a regular slate roof. The chimney stacks are also rubble and have seventeenth century granite caps. The house has an E-shaped plan, with a central, two storey porch and two wings at either end with gable ends. On the upper storey there are 3-light mullion windows, with two sets between the projecting left wing and the porch, one set to the right and one set on each side of the wings and of the porch. On the ground floor, there are 4-light mullion windows with a central wide mullion, set symmetrically below the first floor windows.

The interior of the house has many original features. The main hall has a chamfered fireplace beside a seventeenth century door, and well-preserved plasterwork from the same period at the rear displays the heraldic arms of the Barrett, Bere, Trewin, Coade and Kestell families. The parlour has a sixteenth century or early seventeenth century granite fireplace with a central triangular motif and roll moulding. The main staircase is eighteenth century. Off two of the upstairs chambers, there are seventeenth century garderobes or closets, with single-light windows with pointed tops, each carved from a single piece of timber. The property seems to have been reroofed in the twentieth century. The house is recorded as having eight hearths in the Hearth Tax Returns for 1664.

Tregarden is a Grade II* listed, having been listed on 4 November 1988.
