= Carminow Cross =

Stone Celtic cross in Cornwall, England

- Krows Karvenow (Cornish)
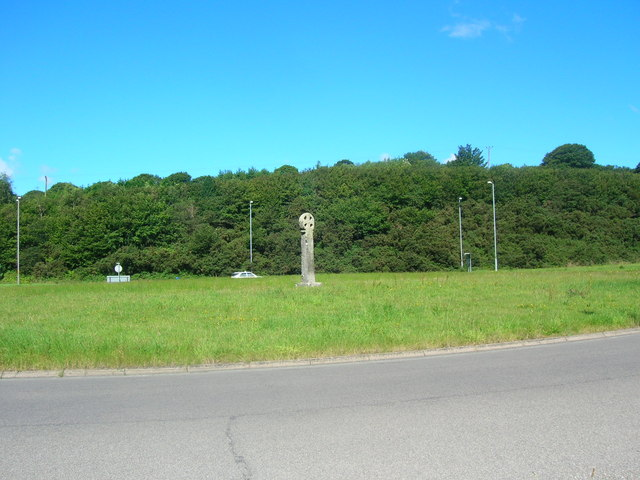

- Location within Cornwall
- 50.459803°N 4.69457°W
- Location: Bodmin, Cornwall, England

Scheduled monument
- Official name: Carminow Cross
- Designated: 22 March 1932
- Reference no.: 1008177

Listed Building – Grade II*
- Official name: Stone Cross at SX 088 656, Carminow
- Designated: 26 March 1949
- Reference no.: 1298242

Carminow Cross (Cornish: Krows Karvenow) is a stone Celtic cross near a major road junction southeast of Bodmin in mid-Cornwall, England. Immediately to the north is Castle Canyke, an Iron Age fort. The cross is a Grade II* listed building.

In the late 19th century and early 20th century the cross was half hidden in a hedge at the back of some cottages which then formed the hamlet of Carminow Cross. A. G. Langdon conjectured that its original position was at the crossroads, before it was moved into the hedge. When road widening was undertaken in the mid-20th century it was moved to its present position surrounded by grass verge.
