= South Pier, Penzance =

Pier in Cornwall, England

South Pier
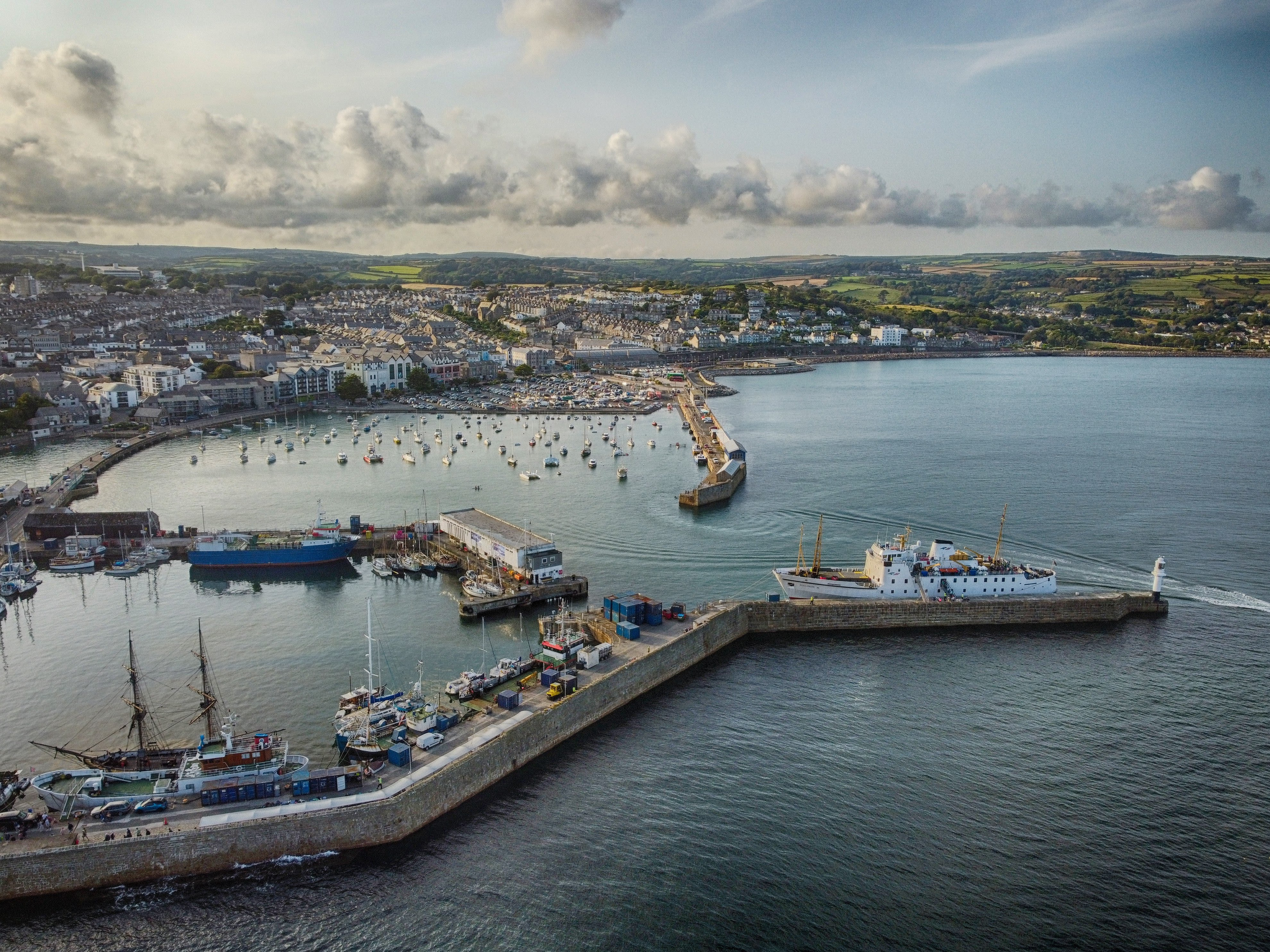
- South Pier in 2023 with the Scillonian docked

- Location within Cornwall
- 50.116667°N 5.529444°W
- Location: Penzance, Cornwall, England

Listed Building – Grade II*
- Official name: South Pier
- Designated: 6 March 2003
- Reference no.: 1096159

South Pier is located in Penzance, Cornwall, England. The original pier predated 1512, but was rebuilt in the 18th century. The pier is a Grade II* listed building.

== History ==
The original South Pier was built before 1512, the year that the current harbour in Penzance was built. It was believed to have been up to 85 metres (279 ft) long. The pier was rebuilt in the 18th century, with a small extension built between 1785 and 1787. It was one of the largest maritime engineering projects in 18th century Cornwall. The pier was further extended in 1812, at a cost of £6,900, and later between 1853 and 1855, it was extended again. At this time, a lighthouse was added to the end of the pier, to help navigation for boats around the nearby Mount's Bay. The lighthouse is 22 feet (6.7 m) tall, and its light is around 33 feet (10 m) above the high water level.

South Pier is built of granite and elvan. In 2003, South Pier became a listed building. In 2010, its status was upgraded from Grade II to Grade II*, which affected proposed redevelopment work on the harbour in order to provide a ferry link from there to the Isles of Scilly.
