= St Thomas Becket chapel, Bodmin =

Medieval chapel of St Thomas Becket
- Location within Cornwall
- Type: Chapel
- Location: Bodmin, Cornwall, United Kingdom
- OS grid reference: SX0736267025

History
- Built: 1377

Site notes
- Area: Central Cornwall
- Architectural style: Medieval

Scheduled monument
- Official name: Medieval chapel of St Thomas Becket 45m east of the church, Priory Road in Bodmin
- Designated: 1950
- Reference no.: 1002937

Listed Building – Grade II
- Official name: RUINS OF THE CHAPEL OF ST THOMAS BECKET
- Designated: 1972
- Reference no.: 1195280

The ruins of a medieval chapel dedicated to St. Thomas Becket are located within the grounds of St Petroc's Church in Bodmin, Cornwall. This chapel, now roofless and in a ruinous state, is protected as a Scheduled Ancient Monument and is also a Grade II listed building, reflecting its historical and architectural significance.

Constructed in the 14th century, the chapel was licensed in 1377. It is a single-story structure with a crypt below the chapel and it is considered that "...the decorated window tracery is of particular interest and rarity for Cornwall".

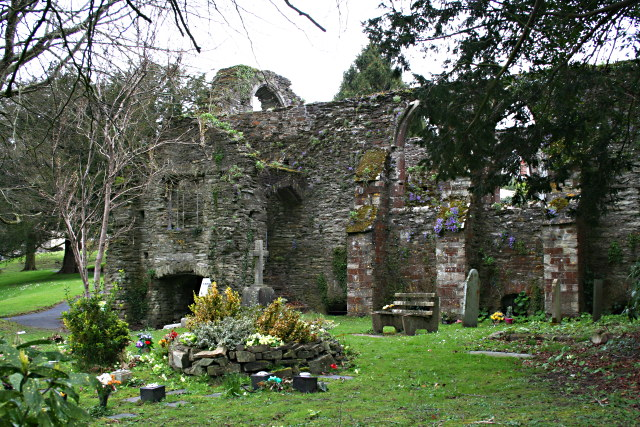
St Thomas Becket chapel

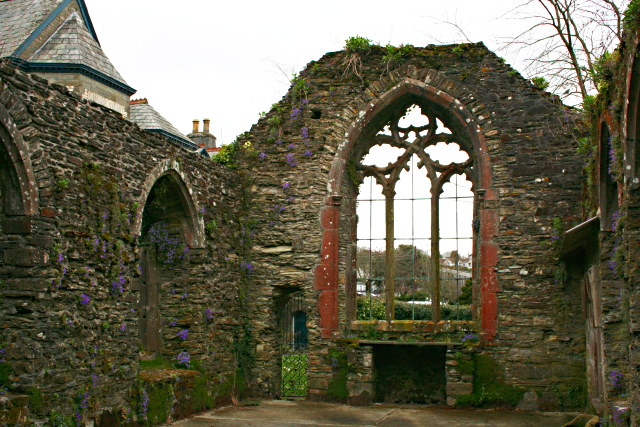
Inside the chapel
