= Treneere Manor =

House in Penzance, Cornwall

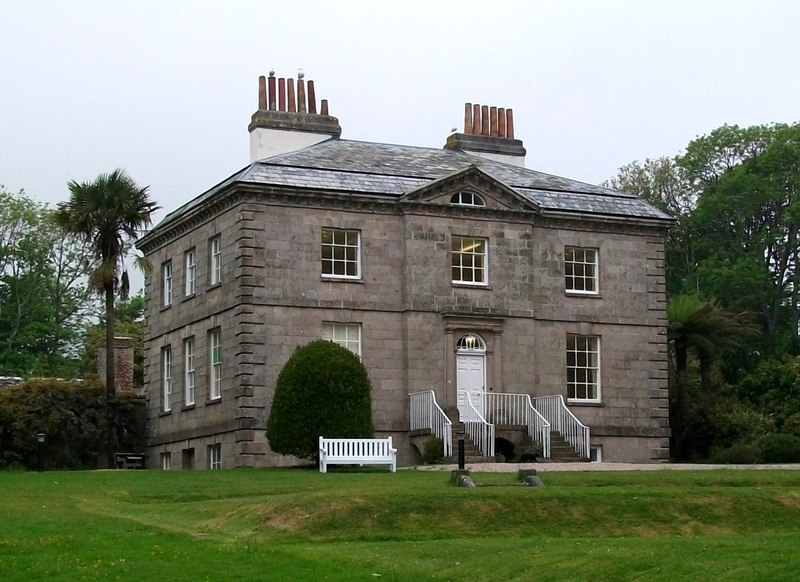

- Location within Cornwall
- 50.127167°N 5.544418°W
- Location: Heamoor, Penzance, Cornwall, England

Site notes
- Owner: Truro and Penwith College

Listed Building – Grade II*
- Official name: Treneere Manor
- Designated: 7 February 1974
- Reference no.: 1143271

Treneere Manor is a Grade II* listed small mansion near Penzance, Cornwall, built in 1758. It is owned by Truro and Penwith College to accommodate the Penwith campus administration.

== Cornish wrestling ==
Cornish wrestling tournaments, for prizes, were held at Treneere Manor in the 1800s and 1900s.
