= Rosehill, Cornwall =

Manor house in Penzance, Cornwall, England

Coordinates: 50°26′09″N 4°47′44″W

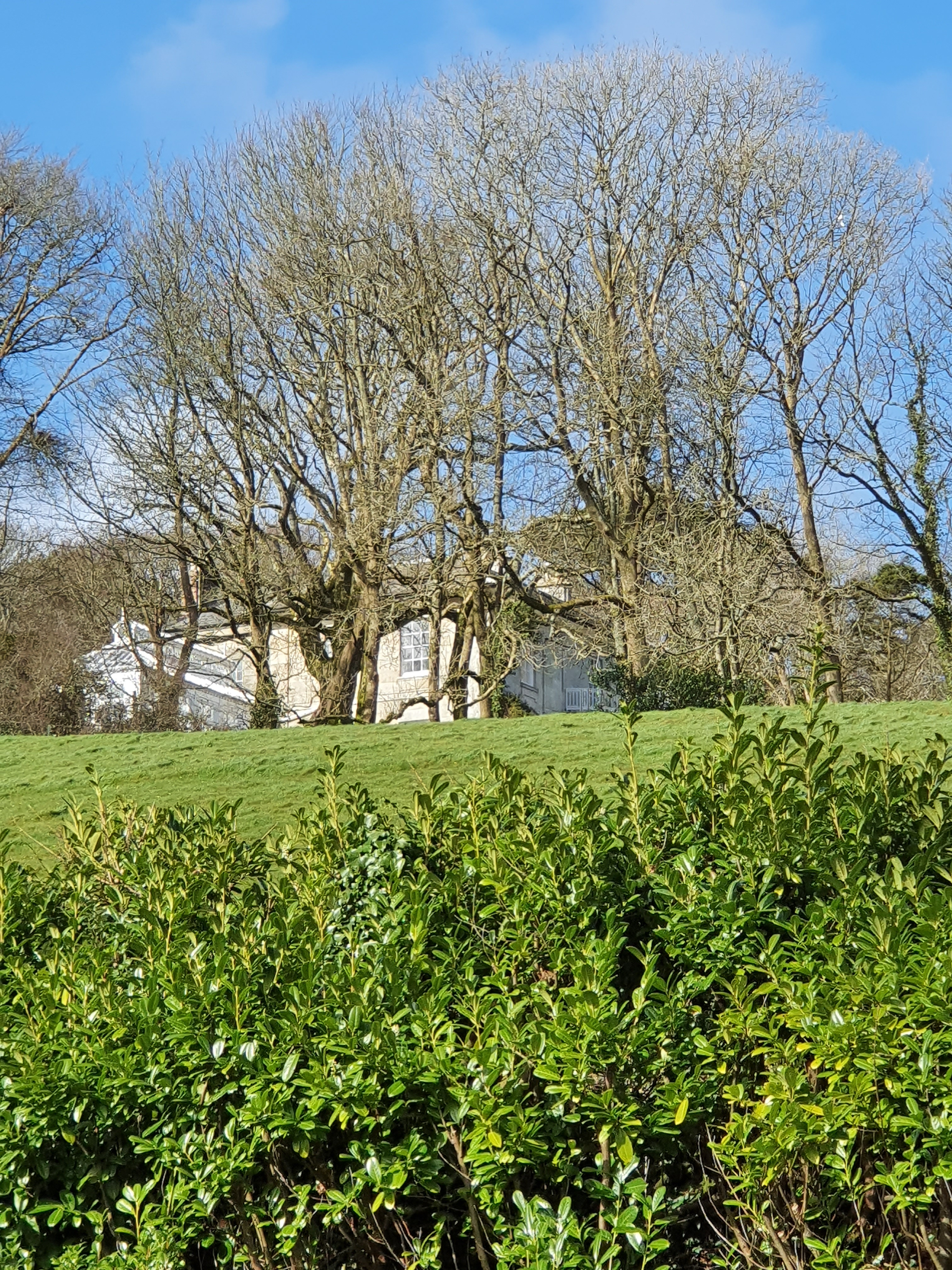

Rosehill Manor is a Grade II* listed country house in the civil parish of Penzance in west Cornwall, England, UK. The house was built in 1814 for Richard Oxnam (1768–1844) one of the three founders of the Penzance Bank in 1797, and altered and extended later in the 19th century. The deeds were destroyed by enemy action during World War II and in the latter part of the 20th century the house was the base for a riding stables.

== Description ==
Described by Peter Laws as one of the most elegant houses of the earliest years of the 19th-century and possibly the best house of the period in Penzance. It lies in an area between three other large houses; Castle Horneck, to the west and Nancealverne and Rosecadgehill, to the east:

.... it is of granite ashlar with slate roof, recessed windows, and an elegant semi-circular open portico with four granite Doric columns and entablature. The front entrance door has two flanking windows with highly ornamented glazing. Internally, it has a magnificent staircase with fine plasterwork surmounted by an elliptical dome.
