= Ellenglaze =

Hamlet in Cornwall, England

Coordinates: 50.378°N 5.130°W

Ellenglaze: Cornish: Heylynglas
- Hamlet
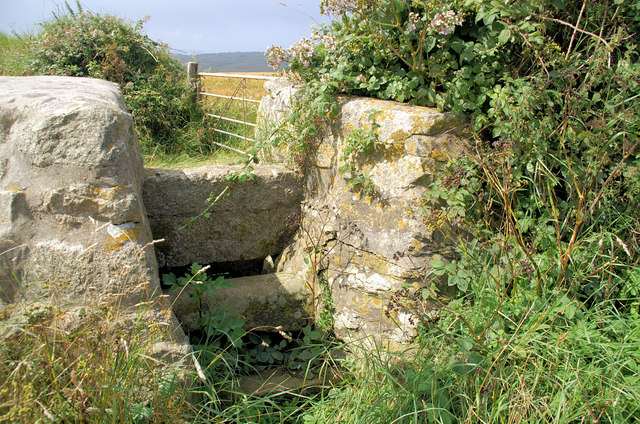
- A stone stile in Ellenglaze

- Location within Cornwall
- Unitary authority: Cornwall
- Region: South West
- Country: England
- Sovereign state: United Kingdom
- Police: Devon and Cornwall
- Fire: Cornwall
- Ambulance: South Western

Ellenglaze (Cornish: Heylynlas, meaning blue/green/grey creek) is a hamlet near the village of Cubert north of Perranporth in Cornwall, England. It lies close to the edge of Penhale Sands.

== History ==
The manor of Ellenglaze is recorded in the Domesday Book as "Elil" (the 'glaze' was likely added later, from Cornish glas, meaning blue or green) and belonging to the monastery of Bodmin and having 2 hides of land and land for 8 ploughs. The monastery had 4 ploughs and 4 serfs there. There were also 8 villeins, 8 smallholders, half a square league of pasture and 20 sheep. The value of it was £1 sterling. "Elil" was at one time identified with a place in the hundred of East Wivelshire. It is the location of a former lead mine, abandoned in 1839.

Ellenglaze Manor is a Grade II listed building, probably dating from the mid-late 17th century, with later alterations.
