= Treguddick Manor =

Manor house in Cornwall, England

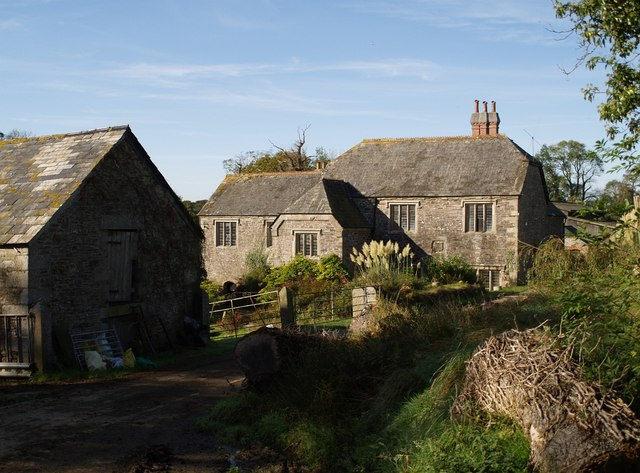

- Location within Cornwall
- 50.61356°N 4.4341°W
- Location: South Petherwin, Cornwall, England

Listed Building – Grade II*
- Official name: Treguddick
- Designated: 1 December 1951
- Reference no.: 1142741

Treguddick Manor is a Grade II* manor house and 18-acre (7.3 ha) estate in the parish of South Petherwin, Cornwall, England, to the southwest of Launceston. It is situated just off the A30 road between Polyphant and Kennard's House, near the River Inny.

== History ==
The dining hall forms the original building, dating back to ca 1090. The structure was completed in 1576 by Nicholas Treguddick, and was later run by the Congdon family of tenant farmers. In 1790 the back two wings were fused together and the current grand staircase built. Following a fire, the house underwent restoration in 1878. The manor served as a workhouse and refuge for the destitute.

== Architecture ==
The house was modified in 1576 to an Elizabethan style and is set in 18 acres. It is built from rubble-stone, with quoins and window mullions in granite, and a roof made of slate. The manor contains eight bedrooms, a hall, drawing room, kitchen and a reception room and has offices, a dairy, and salting, boot and tack rooms in the outer buildings. The main house interior contains flagstone floors, old Victorian fireplaces and the remains of a servant's staircase. In the dining hall there are Elizabeth I's Royal arms, dated 1593 in honour and allegiance to the Queen. Several agricultural buildings of note survive with the manor, including a barn, stables, cart shed and water pump. These date mostly to the 19th century and are grade II listed. manor owners renovated one of the barns and converted it into an information centre with a café in 2018.

The main manor was designated as a grade II* listed building on 1 December 1951

== Distillery ==
In 2019, the firm English Spirit received planning permission to turn an old agricultural building at Treguddick into a gin distillery and attached visitors centre. The company had previously been based in Essex before relocating to Treguddick in Spring 2018. The distillery and its visitor centre are now in operation.
