= Respryn Bridge =

Bridge over the River Fowey in Cornwall

- Pons Resbrini (Cornish)
- Respryn Bridge and the river in 2026

- Location within Cornwall
- 50.4404°N 4.6780°W
- Location: Lanhydrock, Cornwall, England

Listed Building – Grade II*
- Official name: Respryn Bridge
- Designated: 6 June 1969
- Reference no.: 1143087

Respryn Bridge (Cornish: Pons Resbrini) is a 15th-century granite and stone bridge over the River Fowey in the parish of Lanhydrock in Cornwall, England. The bridge is a Grade II* listed building.

== History ==
The current Respryn Bridge was built in the 15th century, replacing an earlier bridge over the River Fowey built around 1300. The bridge was on the old road from Bodmin to Looe. During the English Civil War, the bridge was used a strategic crossing point between Lanhydrock and Boconnoc, who were on opposing sides in the conflict. The bridge was initially held by Roundheads led by Robert Devereux, 3rd Earl of Essex, but was captured by Cavaliers led by Sir Richard Grenville, 1st Baronet in 1644. That same year, King Charles I crossed over the bridge. The bridge carries a through road, with the entrance of Lanhydrock House a short distance away.

In 1969, Respryn Bridge became a Grade II* listed building. In 2006, the bridge was closed for a month after being struck by a lorry, causing thousands of pounds' worth of damage. In 2019, stone bollards were added to the entrance of the bridge, to prevent large vehicles from crossing the bridge.

== Architecture ==
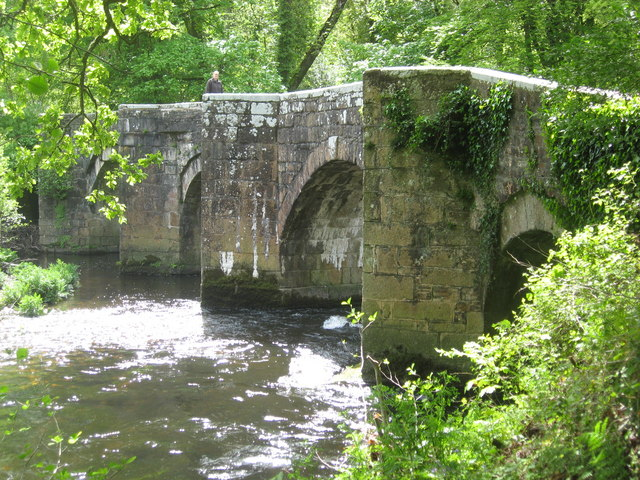
Respryn Bridge in 2009

The current Respryn Bridge is constructed from granite and stone, and has five arches. Only the central arch is original to the bridge; the other four were added later, and the two arches on the western side are the newest. The bridge is 40 metres (130 feet) long, and has a width of 3 m (9.8 ft). The central arch has a span of 15 ft (4.6 m).
