= Cubert =

Coordinates: 50.379°N 5.117°W

Cubert: Cornish: Egloskubert
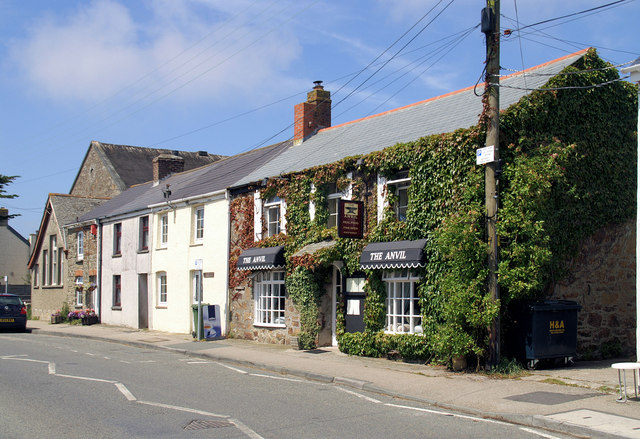
- Cottages and pub of Cubert

- Location within Cornwall
- Population: 1,327 (United Kingdom Census 2011 including Ellenglaze, Gunmow's Shop and Holywell)
- OS grid reference: SW785579
- Civil parish: Cubert
- Unitary authority: Cornwall
- Ceremonial county: Cornwall
- Region: South West
- Country: England
- Sovereign state: United Kingdom
- Post town: NEWQUAY
- Postcode district: TR8
- Dialling code: 01637
- Police: Devon and Cornwall
- Fire: Cornwall
- Ambulance: South Western
- UK Parliament: Truro and Falmouth

Cubert (Cornish: Egloskubert) is a village in Cornwall, England, United Kingdom. It is three miles (5 km) south-southwest of Newquay and is in the civil parish of Cubert (Cornish: Pluw Gubert).

Once known as St Cubert, the village is dominated by the spire of its 13th-century church, St Cubert's which was largely renovated in the 15th century.

The village is named after the Welsh missionary Saint Cubert who, as a companion of Saint Carannog, brought the Christian faith to this part of Cornwall, and to whom the church is dedicated. Unlike his companion St Carannog (who travelled on to Brittany), Saint Cubert returned to Wales becoming abbot of his monastery and, according to the Welsh chronicles, dying in 775. The feast of Saint Cubert is celebrated on the Sunday following 4 October. Gilbert H. Doble included translations of the "Vita Carantoci" and extracts from the "Léon Breviary" in his account of St Carannog. After reviewing all the evidence he could find he concluded that Saint Carannog had been the leader of a band of Welsh missionaries who came to the Crantock district to evangelize it; Cubert was among his followers, and after their work in Cornwall was done they went on to Brittany where a district around Léon has place-names and dedications related to these missionary saints. St Cubert's holy well is in a cave accessible only at low tide towards the north end of Holywell Bay.

The hamlets of Tresean, Treveal, Trevemper, Treworgans and Ellenglaze are in the parish.

== History and antiquities ==
The village has been without its prefix 'St' since the 16th/17th century when it was abandoned at the same time as the churchwardens whitewashed over the figure of St Cubert dressed as an abbot on the inside wall of the church. On early maps it often appears as St Kibberd—possibly indicating what the visiting cartographer heard when a local inhabitant was asked the name of the village.

To the west of the village, halfway between the village and the coast, is the medieval holy well dedicated to St Cubert, from which the coastal bay takes its name. At the north end of the beach, only accessible two hours before and after low-tide, is a natural well in the rock that 19th century romanticists like to think was the origin of the name Holywell.

A mile to the east of the village near the Newquay crossroads, where the four parishes of St Cubert, Crantock, St Newlyn East and Perranzabuloe meet, was the chapel of St Nectan (the foundations of which were uncovered when the road was widened and straightened in 1970), where on certain feasts during the year the relics of the Patron Saints of the four parishes were carried in procession for their veneration by the faithful.

An inscribed stone, dated from the sixth to eighth centuries, was found imbedded in the walls of the fifteenth-century church. Elisabeth Okasha suggests that it bears the name of "Cenet[o]cus, son of Tege[r]nomalus".

A Cornish cross stands against the wall of the north transept of the church. The small cross head was brought to the churchyard about 1860 from Ellenglaze Lane and mounted on a shaft brought from outside the churchyard.

== Cornish wrestling ==
The champion Cornish wrestler, Thomas Hosken, was from Cubert. He defeated the champion Cornish wrestler of England (Lyttelton Weynorth) in the 1600s and was described as "the strongest man in the county."

== Gallery ==
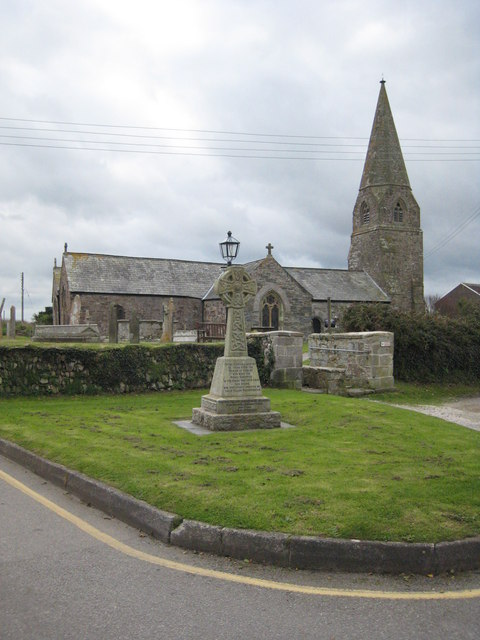
Cubert Church and War Memorial

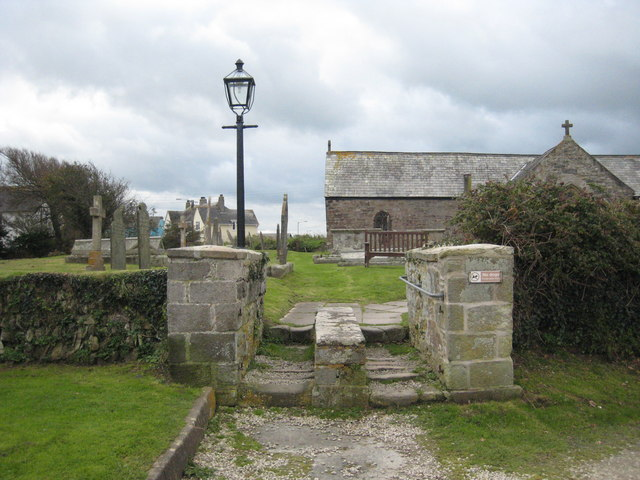
Lych gate at Cubert Church

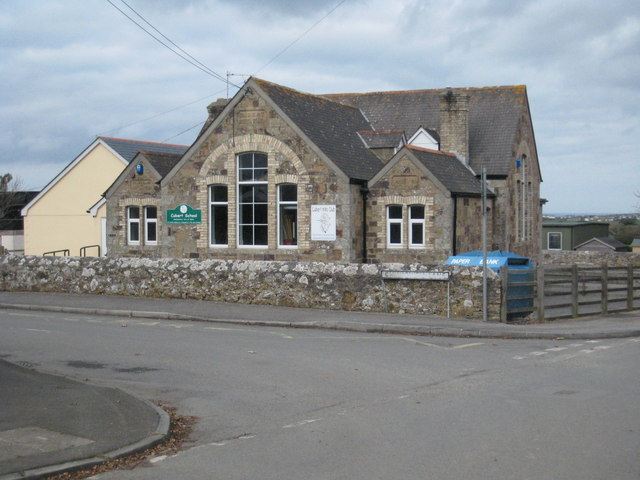
Cubert School

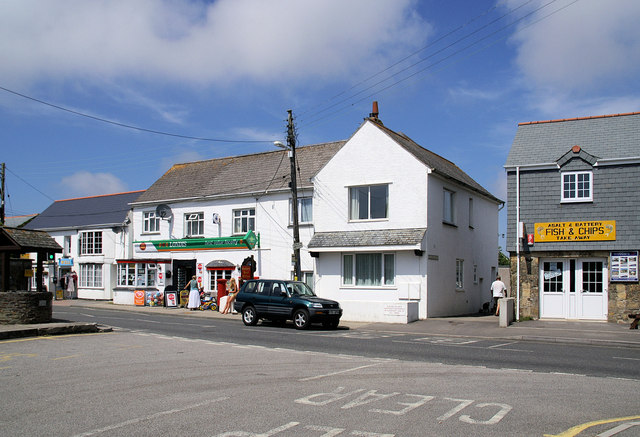
Cubert Post Office
