= Lanhydrock =

Civil parish in Cornwall, England

Coordinates: 50.441°N 4.698°W

Lanhydrock: Cornish: Lannhedrek
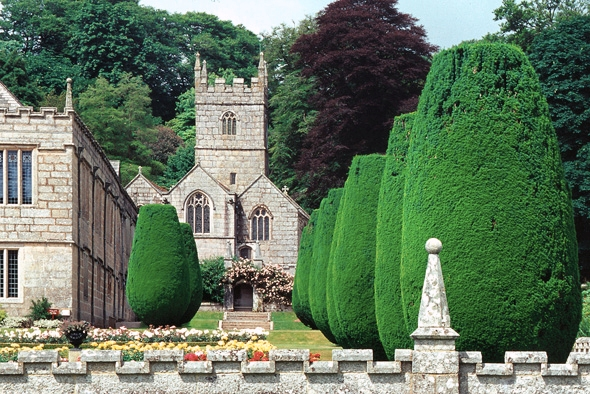
- Lanhydrock church

- Location within Cornwall
- Population: 186 (Civil Parish, 2011)
- Civil parish: Lanhydrock
- Unitary authority: Cornwall
- Ceremonial county: Cornwall
- Region: South West
- Country: England
- Sovereign state: United Kingdom
- Post town: Bodmin
- Postcode district: PL30
- Dialling code: 01208
- Police: Devon and Cornwall
- Fire: Cornwall
- Ambulance: South Western
- UK Parliament: North Cornwall

Lanhydrock (Cornish: Lannhedrek, meaning "church enclosure of St Hydrock") is a civil parish centred on a country estate and mansion in Cornwall, England, United Kingdom. The parish lies south of the town of Bodmin and is bounded to the north by Bodmin parish, to the south by Lanlivery parish and to the west by Lanivet parish. The population was 171 in the 2001 census. This increased to 186 in the 2011 census. The Parish Council meets every two months in Lanhydrock Memorial Hall.

The parish is dominated by Lanhydrock House and its estate of 360 hectares (890 acres). Much of the present house dates back to Victorian times but some sections date from the 1620s. It is a Grade I listed building and is set in gardens with formal areas. Most of the current building dates from late Victorian times, when the estate came under the ownership of the Agar-Robartes family. Since 1953 it has been owned and managed by the National Trust.

Lanhydrock ecclesiastical parish is in the Deanery and Hundred of Pydar and in the Bodmin Registration District. The parish is in the Diocese of Truro and is now part of the Bodmin Team Ministry.

The parish church is dedicated to St Hydroc and stands in the grounds of Lanhydrock House. Parts date back to the late 15th century and the church has a chancel, nave, north and south aisles and three-stage battlemented tower with nine bells. Eight bells date from the late 19th century and are regularly rung. The ninth bell dates from circa 1599 and is only rung infrequently for tolling.
