= Grade I listed buildings in Cornwall =

Cornwall shown in England

There are approximately 372,905 listed historic buildings in England and 2.5% of these are Grade I. This article comprises a list of these buildings in the county of Cornwall.

== List of buildings ==
Name	Location	Type	Completed (Note: The date given is the date used by Historic England as significant for the initial building or that of an important part in the structure's description.)	Date designated	Grid ref. (Note: The grid reference is based on the British national grid reference system, sometimes known as OSGB36, used by the Ordnance Survey.) Geo-coordinates	Entry number (Note: The "List Entry Number" is a unique number assigned to each listed building and scheduled monument by Historic England.)	Image
Church of St Adwen	Advent	Church	13th century, with Norman origins	17 December 1962	SX1047281608; 50°36′12″N 4°40′47″W	1328128	Church of St Adwen More images
Church of St Nonna	Altarnun	Church	Norman	22 November 1960	SX2227681337; 50°36′17″N 4°30′47″W	1142805	Church of St Nonna More images
Antony House	Antony Park, Antony	Country house	1718–29	21 July 1951	SX4176056303; 50°23′07″N 4°13′38″W	1311081	Antony House More images
Forecourt buildings, walls and piers attached to south-east of Antony House	Antony Park, Antony	Country house	1718–29	26 January 1987	SX4178356280; 50°23′06″N 4°13′37″W	1329109	Forecourt buildings, walls and piers attached to south-east of Antony House More images
Church of St James	Antony	Church	13th century	23 January 1968	SX3983354586; 50°22′10″N 4°15′13″W	1140708	Church of St James More images
Church of St Protus and St Hyacinth	Blisland	Church	Norman origins	6 June 1969	SX1003873122; 50°31′37″N 4°40′53″W	1142367	Church of St Protus and St Hyacinth More images
Boconnoc Parish Church (dedication unknown)	Boconnoc Park, Boconnoc	Church	1716	21 August 1964	SX1469360593; 50°24′57″N 4°36′35″W	1140355	Boconnoc Parish Church (dedication unknown) More images
Church of St Petroc	Bodmin	Church	Norman	24 March 1949	SX0731367033; 50°28′17″N 4°43′00″W	1355166	Church of St Petroc More images
Church of Saint Breaca	Churchtown Breage, Breage	Church	1795	10 July 1957	SW6185728448; 50°06′30″N 5°19′55″W	1158264	Church of Saint Breaca More images
Godolphin House	Godolphin, Breage	Farmhouse	Circa late 15th century	10 July 1957	SW6012931840; 50°08′17″N 5°21′30″W	1158437	Godolphin House More images
Forecourt walls, stiles and mounting block at Godolphin House	Godolphin, Breage	Wall	17th century	26 August 1987	SW6013631861; 50°08′18″N 5°21′29″W	1142259	Forecourt walls, stiles and mounting block at Godolphin House More images
Stabling and cobbled pavements adjoining Godolphin House	Godolphin, Breage	Stables	Possibly late 16th or early 17th century	26 August 1987	SW6007931842; 50°08′17″N 5°21′32″W	1158586	Stabling and cobbled pavements adjoining Godolphin House More images
Blowing House and attached walls north-east of Blowing House Cottage on the Godolphin Estate	Godolphin, Breage	Tin works	16th century	14 September 1984	SW6033632058; 50°08′24″N 5°21′20″W	1142264	Upload Photo
Pengersick Castle	Breage	Keep	c.1510	10 July 1957	SW5817828410; 50°06′23″N 5°23′00″W	1311147	Pengersick Castle More images
Church of St Mary the Virgin	Bradoc, Broadoak	Church	13th century	21 August 1964	SX1622862114; 50°25′48″N 4°35′20″W	1140324	Church of St Mary the Virgin More images
Church of St Andrew	Stratton	Church	Mid-14th century	5 March 1952	SS2315706483; 50°49′51″N 4°30′45″W	1279033	Church of St Andrew More images
Church of St Olaf	Poughill, Bude-Stratton	Church	12th century	5 March 1952	SS2224707754; 50°50′31″N 4°31′34″W	1328522	Church of St Olaf More images
St Mary's Church, Callington	Callington	Church	1438	23 January 1968	SX3588069644; 50°30′13″N 4°18′57″W	1140073	St Mary's Church, Callington More images
Dupath Well	Callington	Well	Probably 1510	21 July 1951	SX3750069219; 50°30′01″N 4°17′34″W	1140066	Dupath Well More images
Church of St Andrew	Calstock	Church	Late 14th century	19 October 1987	SX4364869255; 50°30′08″N 4°12′22″W	1140252	Church of St Andrew More images
Cotehele	Calstock	Country house	c.1300	21 July 1951	SX4224068618; 50°29′46″N 4°13′32″W	1140255	Cotehele More images
Retainers Court and screen wall attached to north of Cotehele House	Calstock	Country house	Probably c.1485	21 July 1951	SX4220968593; 50°29′45″N 4°13′34″W	1138043	Retainers Court and screen wall attached to north of Cotehele House More images
Barn about 25 metres south-east of Cotehele House	Calstock	Barn	Late 15th century	19 October 1987	SX4228768556; 50°29′44″N 4°13′30″W	1140258	Barn about 25 metres south-east of Cotehele House More images
New Bridge	Gunnislake, Calstock	Bridge	c.1520	23 January 1968	SX4330972206; 50°31′43″N 4°12′44″W	1140201	New Bridge More images
Church of St Martin and St Meriadocus	Camborne	Church	Mostly late 15th century	1 December 1951	SW6452240042; 50°12′48″N 5°18′07″W	1142659	Church of St Martin and St Meriadocus More images
Church of St Julitta	Lanteglos, Camelford	Church	Norman and later	17 December 1962	SX0881582343; 50°36′34″N 4°42′12″W	1142729	Church of St Julitta More images
Church of St Meubred	Cardinham	Church	15th century	6 June 1969	SX1230768697; 50°29′17″N 4°38′50″W	1143114	Church of St Meubred More images
Church of St Colanus	Colan	Church	1724	10 February 1967	SW8682461300; 50°24′46″N 5°00′07″W	1144182	Church of St Colanus More images
Church of St Constantine	Constantine	Church	c.1420–80	10 July 1957	SW7310429073; 50°07′06″N 5°10′31″W	1142141	Church of St Constantine More images
Church of St Carantoc	Crantock	Church	1236	24 October 1951	SW7904660556; 50°24′12″N 5°06′38″W	1327391	Church of St Carantoc More images
Church of St Cubert	Cubert	Church	13th century	30 May 1967	SW7860957756; 50°22′41″N 5°06′55″W	1141573	Church of St Cubert More images
St Cuby's Church, Cuby	Tregony, Cuby	Church	12th century	30 May 1967	SW9276245252; 50°16′15″N 4°54′34″W	1291868	St Cuby's Church, Cuby More images
Church of Saint Corentin	Cury	Church	12th century	10 July 1957	SW6776321280; 50°02′46″N 5°14′43″W	1157903	Church of Saint Corentin More images
Church of St Cuby	Duloe	Church	13th century	21 August 1964	SX2346458095; 50°23′46″N 4°29′07″W	1312202	Church of St Cuby More images
Penheale Manor	Penheale, Egloskerry	Country house	After 1572	1 December 1951	SX2683388018; 50°39′58″N 4°27′06″W	1160121	Penheale Manor More images
Gate, gate-piers and garden wall to north-east of Penheale Manor	Penheale, Egloskerry	Gate	18th century	11 January 1989	SX2684488040; 50°39′58″N 4°27′06″W	1160167	Upload Photo
Gatehouse at Penheale	Penheale, Egloskerry	Gatehouse	c.1636	22 November 1960	SX2684288052; 50°39′59″N 4°27′06″W	1142958	Upload Photo
Stables at Penheale	Penheale, Egloskerry	Farmhouse	1620	22 November 1960	SX2676288099; 50°40′00″N 4°27′10″W	1142918	Upload Photo
Little Dennis Blockhouse, Pendennis Castle	Pendennis Castle, Falmouth	Castle	1540–45	23 January 1973	SW8274031546; 50°08′39″N 5°02′32″W	1270099	Little Dennis Blockhouse, Pendennis Castle More images
Pendennis Castle	Falmouth	Castle	1540–45	23 January 1973	SW8243031783; 50°08′46″N 5°02′48″W	1270096	Pendennis Castle More images
Church of St Merteriana	Boscastle, Forrabury and Minster	Church	13th century	17 December 1962	SX1107190472; 50°40′59″N 4°40′33″W	1327702	Church of St Merteriana More images
Church of St Fimbarrus or St Nicholas	Fowey	Church	1336	13 March 1951	SX1252851706; 50°20′07″N 4°38′08″W	1327314	Church of St Fimbarrus or St Nicholas More images
Place House	Fowey	House	Mid- to late 15th century	13 March 1951	SX1251751756; 50°20′09″N 4°38′09″W	1218869	Place House More images
Church of Saint Germoe	Germoe	Church	Possibly 12th century	10 July 1957	SW5853829422; 50°06′56″N 5°22′44″W	1142197	Church of Saint Germoe More images
St Germoe's Chair	Germoe	Sedilia building	Probably c.early 13th century	26 August 1987	SW5856629423; 50°06′56″N 5°22′43″W	1310470	St Germoe's Chair More images
Church of St Gerrans	Gerrans	Church	13th century	30 May 1967	SW8727635176; 50°10′42″N 4°58′51″W	1328952	Church of St Gerrans More images
Church of St Grada	Grade-Ruan	Church	13th century	10 July 1957	SW7122014297; 49°59′06″N 5°11′34″W	1141938	Church of St Grada More images
Church of St Rumon	Ruan Major, Grade-Ruan	Church	Possibly c.13th century	10 July 1957	SW7038316426; 50°00′13″N 5°12′21″W	1141915	Church of St Rumon More images
Church of St Crida	Creed	Church	12th century	10 February 1967	SW9349147224; 50°17′20″N 4°54′01″W	1136281	Church of St Crida More images
Church of Saint Winwaloe	Gunwalloe	Church	c.late 15th/early 16th century	10 July 1957	SW6602020548; 50°02′20″N 5°16′08″W	1157975	Church of Saint Winwaloe More images
Church of Saint Wenappa	Gwennap	Church	15th century	30 May 1967	SW7388640105; 50°13′03″N 5°10′15″W	1328991	Church of Saint Wenappa More images
Tower of Church of Saint Wenappa	Gwennap	Bell tower	c.16th century	3 February 1986	SW7389040076; 50°13′03″N 5°10′15″W	1140940	Tower of Church of Saint Wenappa More images
Pengreep House	Pengreep, Gwennap	Farmhouse	Early 18th century	30 May 1967	SW7475638794; 50°12′22″N 5°09′29″W	1136570	Upload Photo
Church of Saint Winnear	Gwinear-Gwithian	Church	13th century	14 January 1988	SW5949737370; 50°11′15″N 5°22′14″W	1159537	Church of Saint Winnear More images
Helland Bridge	Hellandbridge, Helland	Bridge	Early 15th century	6 June 1969	SX0652371488; 50°30′40″N 4°43′49″W	1327910	Helland Bridge More images
Church of St James	Jacobstow	Church	15th century	29 September 1961	SX1981495840; 50°44′03″N 4°33′17″W	1328255	Church of St James More images
The Friends Meeting House	Come-to-Good, Kea	House	c.1710	30 May 1967	SW8127940322; 50°13′21″N 5°04′03″W	1140860	The Friends Meeting House More images
St James Church	Kilkhampton	Church	12th century	29 September 1961	SS2525811339; 50°52′30″N 4°29′06″W	1141826	St James Church More images
Church of St Ladoca	Ladock	Church	15th century	17 October 1984	SW8945750986; 50°19′16″N 4°57′33″W	1310553	Church of St Ladoca More images
Church of St Winwalaus	Church Cove, Landewednack	Church	11th century	9 October 1984	SW7114212672; 49°58′13″N 5°11′34″W	1141920	Church of St Winwalaus More images
Church of St Michael	Landrake, Landrake with St. Erney	Church	Some 13th-century masonry	23 January 1968	SX3740260506; 50°25′19″N 4°17′25″W	1140553	Church of St Michael More images
Church of St Leonard and St Dilpe	Landulph	Church	Probably 14th century	23 January 1968	SX4311261512; 50°25′57″N 4°12′37″W	1140179	Church of St Leonard and St Dilpe More images
Church of St Sidwell	Laneast	Church	12th century	22 November 1960	SX2279283994; 50°37′43″N 4°30′25″W	1159130	Church of St Sidwell More images
Church of St Hydroc	Lanhydrock Park, Lanhydrock	Church	Probably early 15th century	6 June 1969	SX0851263625; 50°26′28″N 4°41′53″W	1158013	Church of St Hydroc More images
Lanhydrock House	Lanhydrock Park, Lanhydrock	House	17th century on earlier foundation	25 October 1951	SX0853963587; 50°26′27″N 4°41′52″W	1157870	Lanhydrock House More images
Gatehouse about 40 metres east of Lanhydrock House	Lanhydrock Park, Lanhydrock	Gate	1651	25 October 1951	SX0863663602; 50°26′28″N 4°41′47″W	1157994	Gatehouse about 40 metres east of Lanhydrock House More images
Gateway and flanking walls at the east entrance to Lanhydrock House	Lanhydrock Park, Lanhydrock	Gate	1657	15 April 1988	SX0957063567; 50°26′28″N 4°41′00″W	1143097	Gateway and flanking walls at the east entrance to Lanhydrock House More images
Church of St Nivet	Lanivet	Church	Early 15th century	6 June 1969	SX0394064208; 50°26′42″N 4°45′46″W	1158241	Church of St Nivet More images
Church of St Brevita	Lanlivery	Church	Late 14th century	10 February 1967	SX0799159046; 50°23′59″N 4°42′11″W	1137701	Church of St Brevita More images
Church of St Manarck and St Dunstan	Lanreath	Church	15th century, Norman origins	21 August 1964	SX1811556911; 50°23′02″N 4°33′35″W	1136993	Church of St Manarck and St Dunstan More images
Church of St Ildierna	Lansallos	Church	1331	21 August 1964	SX1724251589; 50°20′09″N 4°34′10″W	1365628	Church of St Ildierna More images
Church of St Tallanus	Talland, Lansallos	Church	Circa 13th century	21 August 1964	SX2285951629; 50°20′16″N 4°29′26″W	1140743	Church of St Tallanus More images
Church of St Wyllow	Lanteglos-by-Fowey	Church	Late 14th century	21 August 1964	SX1446951523; 50°20′04″N 4°36′30″W	1312492	Church of St Wyllow More images
St Swithin's Church	Launcells	Church	14th century	9 September 1985	SS2438905715; 50°49′27″N 4°29′41″W	1141834	St Swithin's Church More images
Church of St Mary Magdalene	Launceston	Church	14th century	27 February 1950	SX3320884675; 50°38′16″N 4°21′36″W	1280301	Church of St Mary Magdalene More images
Church of St Stephen	Launceston	Church	1259	27 February 1950	SX3247685701; 50°38′49″N 4°22′15″W	1297830	Church of St Stephen More images
Launceston Castle Keep and attached buildings	Launceston	Castle	1341	7 June 1993	SX3311384647; 50°38′15″N 4°21′41″W	1297840	Launceston Castle Keep and attached buildings More images
The North Gatehouse of Launceston Castle and attached walls	Launceston	Tower	12th century	7 June 1993	SX3304584655; 50°38′15″N 4°21′45″W	1280359	Upload Photo
The South Gate	Launceston	Town gate	Early 19th century	27 February 1950	SX3324184537; 50°38′12″N 4°21′34″W	1298820	The South Gate More images
The South Gatehouse of Launceston Castle and attached buildings	Launceston	Gatehouse	13th century	7 June 1993	SX3304584525; 50°38′11″N 4°21′44″W	1196033	The South Gatehouse of Launceston Castle and attached buildings
The West Bridge (Prior's Bridge)	St Thomas, Launceston	Bridge	Late Medieval	27 February 1950	SX3278985095; 50°38′29″N 4°21′58″W	1196031	The West Bridge (Prior's Bridge) More images
Chapel of St Mary Magdalene	Trecarrell, Lezant	Chapel	Early 16th century	22 November 1960	SX3178078259; 50°34′47″N 4°22′38″W	1291332	Chapel of St Mary Magdalene More images
Greystone Bridge	Lezant	Bridge	1439	1 December 1951	SX3683480342; 50°36′00″N 4°18′25″W	1219394	Greystone Bridge More images
Trecarrell Manor	Trecarrell, Lezant	Farmhouse	Early 16th century	1 December 1951	SX3175278277; 50°34′48″N 4°22′40″W	1219694	Upload Photo
Church of St Melor	Linkinhorne	Church	15th century	21 August 1964	SX3195273559; 50°32′15″N 4°22′22″W	1311136	Church of St Melor More images
Church of St Martin by Looe	St Martin, Looe	Church	Norman	19 March 1951	SX2599255032; 50°22′10″N 4°26′54″W	1282854	Church of St Martin by Looe More images
Church of St Bartholomew	Lostwithiel	Church	13th century	18 October 1949	SX1044059797; 50°24′27″N 4°40′09″W	1327333	Church of St Bartholomew More images
Freemasons' Hall	Lostwithiel	Freemasons hall	c.1280	18 October 1949	SX1048059724; 50°24′24″N 4°40′07″W	1327326	Freemasons' Hall More images
Lostwithiel Bridge	Lostwithiel	Bridge	Mid-15th century	18 October 1949	SX1061559809; 50°24′27″N 4°40′00″W	1327324	Lostwithiel Bridge More images
Church of St Ciricius and St Julitta	Luxulyan	Church	Mid–late 15th century	10 February 1967	SX0520458067; 50°23′25″N 4°44′30″W	1158407	Church of St Ciricius and St Julitta More images
Church of St Maddern	Madron	Church	14th and 15th century	10 June 1954	SW4534331813; 50°07′54″N 5°33′53″W	1312533	Church of St Maddern More images
Church of St Germanus	Rame, Maker-with-Rame	Church	Consecrated 1259	23 January 1968	SX4262649150; 50°19′16″N 4°12′43″W	1310051	Church of St Germanus More images
Church of St Mary and St Julian	Maker-with-Rame	Church	c.1500	23 January 1968	SX4463351992; 50°20′50″N 4°11′06″W	1140716	Church of St Mary and St Julian More images
Church of Saint Manacca	Manaccan	Church	12th century	10 July 1957	SW7639425030; 50°05′00″N 5°07′37″W	1328590	Church of Saint Manacca More images
Church of St Marwenne	Marhamchurch	Church	14th century	29 September 1961	SS2230903689; 50°48′20″N 4°31′24″W	1230750	Church of St Marwenne More images
Church of Saint Maugan	Mawgan, Mawgan-in-Meneage	Church	13th century	10 July 1957	SW7095525094; 50°04′54″N 5°12′11″W	1328596	Church of Saint Maugan More images
Trelowarren House	Trelowarren, Mawgan-in-Meneage	House	Late medieval, remodelled 1609–65	10 July 1957	SW7207823841; 50°04′15″N 5°11′11″W	1159172	Trelowarren House More images
Church of St Mawgan	St Mawgan, St Mawgan in Pydar	Church	13th century	12 May 1988	SW8723065946; 50°27′17″N 4°59′56″W	1144128	Church of St Mawgan More images
Lanherne Carmelite Convent	St Mawgan, St Mawgan in Pydar	Convent	Early 16th century	12 May 1988	SW8718365913; 50°27′16″N 4°59′58″W	1144134	Lanherne Carmelite Convent More images
Church of St Lalluwy	Menheniot	Church	Consecrated 1293	21 August 1964	SX2878962820; 50°26′25″N 4°24′45″W	1329431	Church of St Lalluwy More images
Church of St Michael	Michaelstow	Church	Possibly 13th century	17 December 1962	SX0807478868; 50°34′41″N 4°42′44″W	1158085	Church of St Michael More images
Church of St Wenna	Morval	Church	15th century	18 December 1985	SX2602856720; 50°23′04″N 4°26′55″W	1311998	Church of St Wenna More images
Morval House	Morval	House	c.15th century	18 December 1985	SX2598756634; 50°23′02″N 4°26′57″W	1311992	Morval House More images
St Michael's Mount	Mount's Bay	Castle	c.1135	9 October 1987	SW5146729843; 50°06′59″N 5°28′40″W	1143795	St Michael's Mount More images
Church of St Morwenna and St John the Baptist	Morwenstow	Church	12th century	29 September 1961	SS2050515315; 50°54′34″N 4°33′16″W	1141774	Church of St Morwenna and St John the Baptist More images
Tonacombe Manor	Morwenstow	House	Early 16th century	26 September 1951	SS2092514506; 50°54′08″N 4°32′53″W	1231185	Upload Photo
Church of St Mellanus	Churchtown, Mullion	Church	15th century	10 July 1957	SW6789119198; 50°01′39″N 5°14′32″W	1158147	Church of St Mellanus More images
Church of Saint Mylor	Mylor Churchtown, Mylor	Church	Predominantly 15th century	30 May 1967	SW8202635242; 50°10′37″N 5°03′15″W	1141632	Church of Saint Mylor More images
Church of St Columba	St Columb Minor, Newquay	Church	14th century	24 October 1951	SW8397762401; 50°25′18″N 5°02′33″W	1144140	Church of St Columba More images
Church of St Torney	North Hill	Church	Largely late 15th or early 16th century	22 November 1960	SX2719076646; 50°33′50″N 4°26′29″W	1249982	Church of St Torney More images
Church of St Paternus	North Petherwin	Church	Norman origins	23 August 1957	SX2819689626; 50°40′51″N 4°26′00″W	1142903	Church of St Paternus More images
Church of St Denis	North Tamerton	Church	Early 15th century	29 September 1961	SX3119597327; 50°45′03″N 4°23′40″W	1142437	Church of St Denis More images
Church of St Petroc	Padstow	Church	c.12th-century origins	24 April 1953	SW9157575409; 50°32′28″N 4°56′34″W	1289931	Church of St Petroc More images
Prideaux Place	Padstow	Country house	Late 16th century	24 April 1953	SW9137575572; 50°32′33″N 4°56′45″W	1212008	Prideaux Place More images
Entrance gate and flanking walls forming mock fortifications to east of Prideaux Place	Prideaux Place, Padstow	Gate	Before 1758	24 April 1953	SW9140875578; 50°32′34″N 4°56′43″W	1289743	Entrance gate and flanking walls forming mock fortifications to east of Prideaux Place More images
Church of St Nonna	Churchtown Pelynt, Pelynt	Church	Possibly 14th century	21 August 1964	SX2031655055; 50°22′04″N 4°31′41″W	1161660	Church of St Nonna More images
Church of Pol de Leon	Paul, Penzance	Church	15th century	29 July 1950	SW4645427082; 50°05′23″N 5°32′46″W	1327894	Church of Pol de Leon More images
Egyptian House	Penzance	House	Early 19th century	29 July 1950	SW4730730181; 50°07′04″N 5°32′10″W	1143147	Egyptian House More images
Market Building, Penzance	Penzance	Market hall	1837	29 July 1950	SW4727430293; 50°07′08″N 5°32′12″W	1221062	Market Building, Penzance More images
Church of St Felix	Philleigh	Church	14th century	30 May 1967	SW8711639461; 50°13′00″N 4°59′07″W	1141029	Church of St Felix More images
Church of St Odulphus	Pillaton	Church	Probably 14th century	23 January 1968	SX3669864313; 50°27′21″N 4°18′07″W	1311439	Church of St Odulphus More images
Church of St Winwaloe	Poundstock	Church	13th century or earlier	29 September 1961	SX2021999453; 50°46′00″N 4°33′03″W	1231799	Church of St Winwaloe More images
The Gildhouse (listed as Guildhouse)	Poundstock	Church house	16th century	29 September 1961	SX2020699411; 50°45′59″N 4°33′03″W	1141793	The Gildhouse (listed as Guildhouse) More images
Church of St Probus	Probus	Tower	c.1523	30 May 1967	SW8990147728; 50°17′31″N 4°57′04″W	1310352	Church of St Probus More images
Trewithen House	Probus	Country house	1723	20 February 1956	SW9130947516; 50°17′26″N 4°55′52″W	1141100	Trewithen House More images
Pavilion north-west of Trewithen House	Probus	Pavilion	c.1740	17 October 1984	SW9127947542; 50°17′27″N 4°55′54″W	1328913	Pavilion north-west of Trewithen House More images
Pavilion north-east of Trewithen House	Probus	Pavilion	c.1740	17 October 1984	SW9133547545; 50°17′27″N 4°55′51″W	1160827	Pavilion north-east of Trewithen House More images
Church of St Hugh of Lincoln	Quethiock	Church	c.early to mid-14th century	23 January 1968	SX3130164746; 50°27′30″N 4°22′41″W	1140035	Church of St Hugh of Lincoln More images
Chapel of St Michael at Roche Rock	Roche	Chapel	Licensed 1409	10 February 1967	SW9911259618; 50°24′07″N 4°49′42″W	1327342	Chapel of St Michael at Roche Rock More images
Church of St Rumon	Ruan Lanihorne	Church	13th century	30 May 1967	SW8944242026; 50°14′26″N 4°57′15″W	1141087	Church of St Rumon More images
Church of St Stephen	Saltash	Church	Probably 15th century	17 January 1952	SX4170058334; 50°24′13″N 4°13′44″W	1140379	Church of St Stephen More images
Granite archway and wall to Nos 15 and 17 (Kingsleigh House) fronting road	Saltash	Wall	17th century	22 November 1982	SX4293658782; 50°24′28″N 4°12′42″W	1159090	Upload Photo
Ince Castle	Saltash	Castle	1653	17 January 1952	SX4013556514; 50°23′12″N 4°15′01″W	1329260	Ince Castle More images
Church of St Nicholas and St Faith	Saltash	Church	Norman origins	17 January 1952	SX4310858813; 50°24′29″N 4°12′34″W	1140384	Church of St Nicholas and St Faith More images
Church of St Mary	Sheviock	Church	13th century	23 January 1968	SX3701755092; 50°22′23″N 4°17′36″W	1140579	Church of St Mary More images
Church of Saint Sithney	Sithney	Church	15th century	10 July 1957	SW6365128993; 50°06′50″N 5°18′26″W	1142179	Church of Saint Sithney More images
St Sampson's Church, South Hill	South Hill	Church	Dedicated 1333	21 August 1964	SX3295872626; 50°31′46″N 4°21′30″W	1140786	St Sampson's Church, South Hill More images
Church of St Paternus	South Petherwin	Church	Norman origins, largely rebuilt 15th century	22 November 1960	SX3094481908; 50°36′44″N 4°23′27″W	1142745	Church of St Paternus More images
Church of Saint Anthony	St Anthony-in-Meneage	Church	12th century	10 July 1957	SW7828925666; 50°05′23″N 5°06′03″W	1141687	Church of Saint Anthony More images
Holy Trinity Church	St Austell	Church	15th century	28 November 1950	SX0141952452; 50°20′18″N 4°47′31″W	1211925	Holy Trinity Church More images
Church of St Brueredus	St Breward	Church	Dedicated 1278	17 December 1962	SX0972877346; 50°33′53″N 4°41′17″W	1158842	Church of St Brueredus More images
Church of Saint Buryan	St Buryan	Church	15th century	15 December 1988	SW4091425718; 50°04′30″N 5°37′21″W	1327526	Church of Saint Buryan More images
Church of St Clarus	St Cleer	Church	Early 15th century with Norman origins	21 August 1964	SX2478268154; 50°29′13″N 4°28′17″W	1140474	Church of St Clarus More images
St Cleer's Well and wall	St Cleer	Wall	Late 15th century	21 August 1964	SX2494868310; 50°29′18″N 4°28′09″W	1140482	St Cleer's Well and wall More images
Church of St Clement	St Clement	Church	14th century	30 May 1967	SW8506043876; 50°15′20″N 5°01′00″W	1328900	Church of St Clement More images
Church of St Columba	St Columb Major	Church	14th century	10 February 1967	SW9129763675; 50°26′09″N 4°56′25″W	1144068	Church of St Columba More images
Nine Maidens	St Columb Major	Standing stones	Early Bronze Age	10 February 1967	SW9365667589; 50°28′18″N 4°54′33″W	1144121	Nine Maidens More images
Church of St Dominica	St Dominic	Church	14th century	23 January 1968	SX3989067827; 50°29′18″N 4°15′30″W	1158849	Church of St Dominica More images
Church of St Endelienta	St Endellion	Church	c.early 15th century	6 June 1969	SW9970378664; 50°34′24″N 4°49′48″W	1320630	Church of St Endelienta More images
Roscarrock	St Endellion	House	Late 15th or early 16th century	25 October 1951	SW9863480379; 50°35′18″N 4°50′46″W	1115088	Roscarrock More images
Church of St Enoder	St Enoder	Church	14th-century origin	10 February 1967	SW8924756969; 50°22′29″N 4°57′55″W	1311865	Church of St Enoder More images
Church of Saint Erth	St Erth	Church	15th century	14 January 1988	SW5498535027; 50°09′52″N 5°25′56″W	1327632	Church of Saint Erth More images
Church of St Uvelus	St Eval	Church	Late 11th or early 12th century	6 June 1969	SW8719369181; 50°29′01″N 5°00′04″W	1289472	Church of St Uvelus More images
Church of All Saints	St Ewe	Church	13th century	10 February 1967	SW9779146044; 50°16′47″N 4°50′22″W	1137082	Church of All Saints More images
Church of St Genesius	Rosecare, St Gennys	Church	12th century	29 September 1961	SX1489697173; 50°44′40″N 4°37′30″W	1142413	Church of St Genesius More images
Church of St Germanus	St Germans	Church	12th century	23 January 1968	SX3594257751; 50°23′48″N 4°18′35″W	1140544	Church of St Germanus More images
Molenick Farmhouse	St Germans	Farmhouse	Early 16th century	21 July 1951	SX3348461183; 50°25′37″N 4°20′45″W	1329177	Upload Photo
Port Eliot	St Germans	Country house	Early 18th century	21 July 1951	SX3596057793; 50°23′49″N 4°18′34″W	1140516	Port Eliot More images
Church of Saint Hilary	St Hilary	Church	13th-century tower	10 June 1954	SW5504631298; 50°07′52″N 5°25′44″W	1310334	Church of Saint Hilary More images
Church of St Petroc Minor	Little Petherick, St Issey	Church	14th century	6 June 1969	SW9182872147; 50°30′43″N 4°56′15″W	1212675	Church of St Petroc Minor More images
Church of St Ivo	St Ive	Church	Consecrated 1338	21 August 1964	SX3093967158; 50°28′47″N 4°23′03″W	1140830	Church of St Ivo More images
Church of St Ia	St Ives	Chapel	1410 to 1434	4 June 1952	SW5182240525; 50°12′45″N 5°28′48″W	1143424	Church of St Ia More images
Church of St Uny	Lelant, St Ives	Church	Norman	4 June 1952	SW5482737728; 50°11′19″N 5°26′10″W	1143403	Church of St Uny More images
Church of St John	St John	Church	12th century	23 January 1968	SX4079153692; 50°21′42″N 4°14′23″W	1161834	Church of St John More images
Pendeen Manor House and adjoining wall to south-east	Pendeen, St Just	House	16th century	26 April 1950	SW3839035473; 50°09′41″N 5°39′52″W	1143260	Pendeen Manor House and adjoining wall to south-east More images
Church of Saint Just	St Just in Roseland	Church	13th century	30 May 1967	SW8484535690; 50°10′55″N 5°00′54″W	1141006	Church of Saint Just More images
St Mawes Castle, Gatehouse, Blockhouse, Magazine and Outer Defences	St Mawes, St Just-in-Roseland	Castle	1540–43	25 June 1985	SW8410432752; 50°09′20″N 5°01′25″W	1136705	St Mawes Castle, Gatehouse, Blockhouse, Magazine and Outer Defences More images
Church of St Keverne	St Keverne	Church	c.late 13th century	10 July 1957	SW7912421299; 50°03′03″N 5°05′12″W	1311542	Church of St Keverne More images
Church of St James	St Kew	Church	c.15th century	6 June 1969	SX0215976885; 50°33′29″N 4°47′40″W	1116830	Church of St James More images
Church of Saint Levan	St Levan	Church	13th or 14th century	15 December 1988	SW3803222213; 50°02′32″N 5°39′37″W	1143872	Church of Saint Levan More images
Church of St Mabena	St Mabyn	Church	Largely late 15th century	6 June 1969	SX0417473201; 50°31′33″N 4°45′51″W	1161735	Church of St Mabena More images
Church of St Mellanus	St Mellion	Church	Dedicated 1259	26 November 1985	SX3884565575; 50°28′04″N 4°16′20″W	1140815	Church of St Mellanus More images
Newton Ferrers House	Newton Ferrers, St Mellion	Country house	c.1685–95	21 July 1951	SX3467865891; 50°28′10″N 4°19′52″W	1140810	Newton Ferrers House More images
Newton Ferrers House south-east gatepiers and garden wall	Newton Ferrers, St Mellion	Gate pier	Late 17th century	26 November 1985	SX3470365859; 50°28′09″N 4°19′50″W	1140812	Upload Photo
Newton Ferrers House south-west gatepiers and garden wall	Newton Ferrers, St Mellion	Gate pier	Late 17th century	26 November 1985	SX3464265875; 50°28′10″N 4°19′53″W	1277594	Upload Photo
Newton Ferrers House lower gatepiers and garden wall	Newton Ferrers, St Mellion	Gate pier	Late 17th century	26 November 1985	SX3465565800; 50°28′07″N 4°19′53″W	1140813	Upload Photo
Newton Ferrers House terrace	Newton Ferrers, St Mellion	Balustrade	Late 17th century	26 November 1985	SX3466965858; 50°28′09″N 4°19′52″W	1312304	Upload Photo
Church of St Michael	St Michael Caerhays	Church	1785–1808	10 February 1967	SW9638242179; 50°14′40″N 4°51′26″W	1327073	Church of St Michael More images
Caerhays Castle	St Michael Caerhays	Country house	1808	15 November 1988	SW9710541613; 50°14′23″N 4°50′48″W	1327071	Caerhays Castle More images
Garden wall with gateways and folly tower attached to west and east of Caerhays Castle	St Michael Caerhays	Gate	1808	15 November 1988	SW9716741680; 50°14′25″N 4°50′45″W	1144760	Garden wall with gateways and folly tower attached to west and east of Caerhays Castle More images
Higher Lodge at Caerhays Castle	St Michael Caerhays	Tower	c.1808	15 November 1988	SW9630441731; 50°14′25″N 4°51′29″W	1138159	Higher Lodge at Caerhays Castle More images
Lower Lodge with attached screen walls at Caerhays Castle	St Michael Caerhays	Gate	c.1808	15 November 1988	SW9744741430; 50°14′17″N 4°50′31″W	1311957	Lower Lodge with attached screen walls at Caerhays Castle More images
Service buildings attached to south-west of Caerhays Castle	St Michael Caerhays	Service buildings	1808	15 November 1988	SW9707441590; 50°14′22″N 4°50′50″W	1144759	Service buildings attached to south-west of Caerhays Castle More images
Church of St Michael	St Michael Penkevil	Church	Mostly rebuilt 1859; dedicated 1261	30 May 1967	SW8579242156; 50°14′26″N 5°00′20″W	1141064	Church of St Michael More images
Tregothnan	Tregothnan Park, St Michael Penkevil	House	1650	28 February 1952	SW8576741571; 50°14′07″N 5°00′20″W	1141069	Tregothnan More images
Church of Saint Michael	St Michael's Mount	Chapel	Mostly rebuilt 14th century	9 October 1987	SW5145029841; 50°06′59″N 5°28′41″W	1310728	Church of Saint Michael More images
Church of St Menefreda	St Minver, St. Minver Highlands	Church	12th century and later	6 June 1969	SW9647777084; 50°33′29″N 4°52′29″W	1332584	Church of St Menefreda More images
Church of St Enodoc	Trebetherick, St Minver Lowlands	Church	c.12th century origins	6 June 1969	SW9316177232; 50°33′29″N 4°55′18″W	1211902	Church of St Enodoc More images
Church of St Anietus	St Neot	Church	15th century	5 November 1987	SX1860567857; 50°28′57″N 4°33′30″W	1329212	Church of St Anietus More images
Cargoll Farm Barn	Cargoll, St Newlyn East	Barn	Late 14th century	30 May 1967	SW8194556388; 50°22′01″N 5°04′03″W	1141453	Upload Photo
Trerice	Trerice, St Newlyn East	House	15th century	28 February 1952	SW8411558478; 50°23′11″N 5°02′18″W	1328731	Trerice More images
Church of St Pynnochus	St Pinnock	Church	Late 14th century and onwards; Norman origins	21 August 1964	SX2005463233; 50°26′29″N 4°32′08″W	1140308	Church of St Pynnochus More images
Church of St Sampson	Golant, St Sampson	Church	c.1450–1500	10 February 1967	SX1205655163; 50°21′59″N 4°38′39″W	1158982	Church of St Sampson More images
Church of St Stephen	St Stephen-in-Brannel	Church	12th century	10 February 1967	SW9449453317; 50°20′38″N 4°53′23″W	1137033	Church of St Stephen More images
Higher New Bridge	St Stephens by Launceston Rural	Bridge	c.1504	22 November 1960	SX3489186691; 50°39′23″N 4°20′14″W	1327996	Higher New Bridge More images
Church of St Tetha	St Teath	Church	Norman origins	13 January 1988	SX0643980594; 50°35′34″N 4°44′10″W	1327712	Church of St Tetha More images
Church of St Uda	St Tudy	Church	15th cenbtury, Norman origins	6 June 1969	SX0661776302; 50°33′16″N 4°43′53″W	1162144	Church of St Uda More images
Church of St Ciricus and Julitta	St Veep	Church	Dedicated 1336	21 August 1964	SX1400454993; 50°21′55″N 4°37′00″W	1140311	Church of St Ciricus and Julitta More images
Church of St Wenna	St Wenn	Church	15th century	10 February 1967	SW9679064835; 50°26′53″N 4°51′49″W	1327422	Church of St Wenna More images
Church of St Winnow	St Winnow	Church	Norman traces	21 August 1964	SX1153756971; 50°22′56″N 4°39′08″W	1311942	Church of St Winnow More images
Horse Bridge	Stoke Climsland	Bridge	1437	1 December 1951	SX4000474873; 50°33′06″N 4°15′35″W	1290978	Horse Bridge More images
Church of St Materiana	Tintagel	Church	c.1080	17 December 1962	SX0506188452; 50°39′47″N 4°45′35″W	1327752	Church of St Materiana More images
The Old Post Office	Tintagel	House	Probably 15th century	19 January 1952	SX0562788467; 50°39′48″N 4°45′06″W	1143438	The Old Post Office More images
Church of St Cornelly	Tregoney	Church	13th century	30 May 1967	SW9164945154; 50°16′10″N 4°55′30″W	1328898	Church of St Cornelly More images
Church of St Winwalo	Tremaine	Church	12th century origins	22 November 1960	SX2347489057; 50°40′28″N 4°29′59″W	1142888	Church of St Winwalo More images
Truro Cathedral	Truro	Cathedral	1880	29 December 1950	SW8263444916; 50°15′51″N 5°03′05″W	1205377	Truro Cathedral More images
Church of St Symphorian	Veryan	Church	c.1300	30 May 1967	SW9168239580; 50°13′10″N 4°55′18″W	1141048	Church of St Symphorian More images
Egloshayle Church	Egloshayle, Wadebridge	Church	Largely rebuilt 15th century	6 June 1969	SX0008371909; 50°30′46″N 4°49′16″W	1142961	Egloshayle Church More images
Church of the Nativity of the Blessed Virgin Mary	Week St Mary	Church	14th century	29 September 1961	SX2371797716; 50°45′08″N 4°30′01″W	1137655	Church of the Nativity of the Blessed Virgin Mary More images
Church of Saint Gwendron	Wendron	Church	Probably 13th century	10 July 1957	SW6788631055; 50°08′03″N 5°14′58″W	1328447	Church of Saint Gwendron More images
Trenethick Barton Farmhouse including rear courtyard and walls and gateway	Trenethick Barton, Wendron	Farmhouse	Probably 16th century	10 July 1957	SW6683229107; 50°06′58″N 5°15′46″W	1328458	Trenethick Barton Farmhouse including rear courtyard and walls and gateway More images
Gatehouse and adjoining courtyard walls immediately in front of Trenethick Barton Farmhouse	Trenethick, Wendron	Wall	16th century	17 June 1988	SW6683629089; 50°06′58″N 5°15′46″W	1142019	Upload Photo
Church of St Martin and St Giles	Werrington	Church	1742	23 August 1957	SX3278987612; 50°39′51″N 4°22′02″W	1142855	Church of St Martin and St Giles More images
Cullacott and attached open-fronted cartshed	Werrington	Farmhouse	Early 16th century	23 August 1957	SX3030488058; 50°40′03″N 4°24′10″W	1142836	Upload Photo
Werrington Park House	Werrington	Country house	16th century	23 August 1957	SX3320287118; 50°39′35″N 4°21′41″W	1309836	Werrington Park House More images
Yeolm Bridge	Yeolmbridge, Werrington	Bridge	Mid-14th century	23 August 1957	SX3181187388; 50°39′43″N 4°22′52″W	1161009	Yeolm Bridge More images
Church of St Anne	Whitstone	Church	13th century	29 September 1961	SX2629498610; 50°45′40″N 4°27′52″W	1142426	Church of St Anne More images
Church of St Clement, Withiel	Withiel	Church	18th century	6 June 1969	SW9942665384; 50°27′14″N 4°49′37″W	1143078	Church of St Clement, Withiel More images
Church of Saint Sennar	Zennor	Church	12th century and later	10 June 1954	SW4547438513; 50°11′31″N 5°34′03″W	1312091	Church of Saint Sennar More images

== Isles of Scilly ==
Name	Location	Type	Completed	Date designated	Grid ref. Geo-coordinates	Entry number	Image
Bastions and walls of Star Castle	Hugh Town, St. Mary's	Wall	1593	12 February 1975	SV8991310622; 49°54′55″N 6°19′16″W	1141188	Bastions and walls of Star Castle More images
Outer walls and gateway (to The Garrison)	Hugh Town, St. Mary's	Gate	After 1601	14 December 1992	SV9007510650; 49°54′56″N 6°19′08″W	1291751	Outer walls and gateway (to The Garrison) More images
Powder Magazine and Blast Walls	Hugh Town, St. Mary's	Powder magazine	Early 17th century	14 December 1992	SV9003610636; 49°54′55″N 6°19′10″W	1141187	Powder Magazine and Blast Walls
Star Castle Hotel	Hugh Town, St. Mary's	House	1593	12 February 1975	SV8991810641; 49°54′55″N 6°19′16″W	1291756	Star Castle Hotel More images

== See also ==
- Grade II* listed buildings in Cornwall
- Category:Grade I listed buildings in Cornwall
