= St Sampson's Church =

St Sampson's Church is the name of:

- Saint Sampson's Cathedral in St Petersburg
- St Sampson's Church, Cricklade in Wiltshire
- St Sampson's Church, Golant in Cornwall
- St Sampson's Church, York in North Yorkshire
