= Gerrans =

Village in Cornwall, England

Coordinates: 50.178°N 4.981°W

Gerrans: Cornish: Gerens
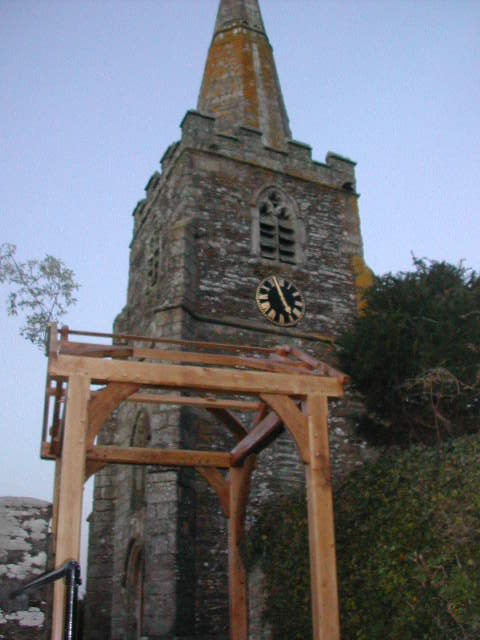
- Gerrans Parish Church

- Location within Cornwall
- Population: 794 (United Kingdom Census 2011 including Bohortha and Corgurrell)
- OS grid reference: SW873352
- Civil parish: Gerrans
- Unitary authority: Cornwall
- Ceremonial county: Cornwall
- Region: South West
- Country: England
- Sovereign state: United Kingdom
- Post town: TRURO
- Postcode district: TR2
- Dialling code: 01872
- Police: Devon and Cornwall
- Fire: Cornwall
- Ambulance: South Western
- UK Parliament: Truro and Falmouth

Gerrans (Cornish: Gerens) is a coastal civil parish and village on the Roseland Peninsula in Cornwall, England, United Kingdom. The village adjoins Portscatho (the villages have almost merged into one but retain their identities) on the east side of the peninsula. The village is situated approximately seven miles (11 km) south-southeast of Truro.

The name Gerrans derives from Gerent, a 6th-century Cornish saint. The parish runs north–south along the eastern side of the Roseland peninsula. It is bounded to the south and east by the sea, to the west by St Just in Roseland parish, and to the north by Philleigh parish. The population was 933 in the 2001 census, reducing to 794 at the 2011 census. Trewithian is the only settlement of any size in the parish apart from Gerrans and Portscatho.

Gerrans lies within the Cornwall Area of Outstanding Natural Beauty (AONB).

== History and landmarks ==
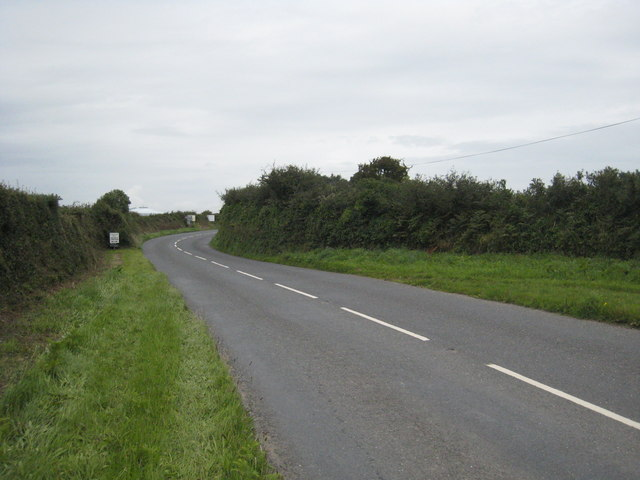
This bend in the A3078 curves around the rampart of Dingerein Castle, an Iron Age hill fort

Gerrans parish church (dedicated to St Gerent or Gerendus) was built in the 13th century and enlarged in the 15th century when the south and aisle and the tower topped with a spire were added. However, in 1849 everything except the tower was rebuilt (by William White of Truro) though this was done as closely as possible to the original church. The two-stage tower is buttressed, battlemented, and topped by a spire.

There is a fine Cornish cross in the churchyard. According to Andrew Langdon (1994) this cross was not originally a churchyard cross but a wayside cross. No other ancient stone cross exists in the Roseland Peninsula; however a cross called Penpirthe Cross is shown on the parish terrier of 1613 as standing on the boundary of the parishes of Gerrans and Philleigh.

The manor of Tregear belonged to the Bishops of Exeter in mediaeval times and Gerent may have had a castle (Dingerein or Dinurrin) here. At the time of Domesday Book (1086) the manor was recorded as having 12 hides of land and land for 60 ploughs. The lord (the Bishop of Exeter) held half a hide of land with 2 ploughs and 6 serfs, and 18 villeins and 12 smallholders had the rest of the land with 16 ploughs. There was a quarter of a square league of pasture and half a square league of woodland. Though the value had formerly been only £5 sterling the manor was then worth £8. The manor of Tregear (or Tregaire) was one of the Cornish manors of the Bishops of Exeter; it covered much of the Roseland peninsula.

A small museum, the Gerrans Parish Heritage Centre, is located in the village.
