= Trewithian =

Coordinates: 50.197°N 4.975°W

Trewithian: Cornish: Trewydhyan
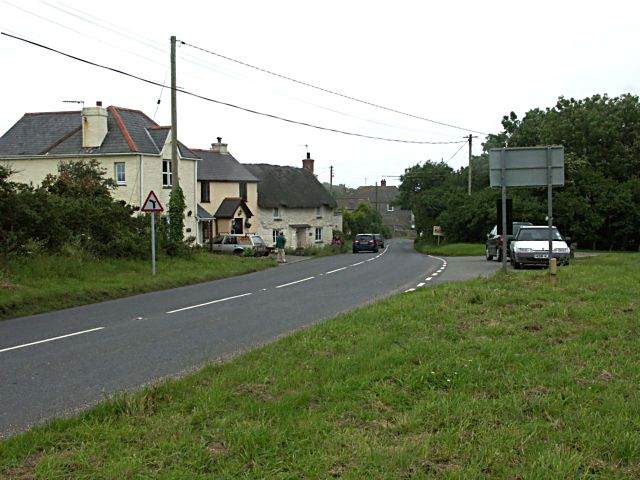
- Trewithian

- Location within Cornwall
- OS grid reference: SW878372
- Unitary authority: Cornwall
- Ceremonial county: Cornwall
- Region: South West
- Country: England
- Sovereign state: United Kingdom

Trewithian (Cornish: Trewydhyan) is a hamlet near Portscatho in Cornwall, England.

Trewithian lies within the Cornwall Area of Outstanding Natural Beauty (AONB).
