= St Mary's Church, Callington =

Church in Callington, Cornwall

St Mary's Church
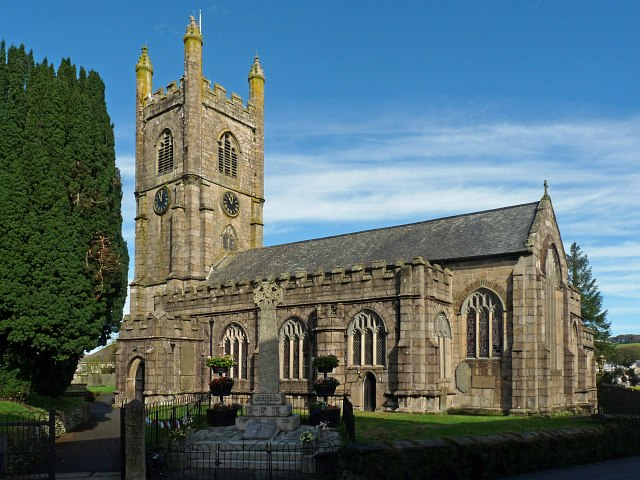
- St Mary's Church
- 50.50365°N 4.31546°W
- Location: Callington
- Country: England
- Denomination: Church of England

Administration
- Diocese: Truro
- Archdeaconry: Bodmin
- Deanery: East Wivelshire

St Mary's Church, Callington is a Grade I listed parish church in Callington, Cornwall, England. The present building was consecrated in 1438 on the site of an earlier chapel and was enlarged in the 15th century, with restoration in the 19th century, including work by J.P. St Aubyn and J. D. Sedding. The building is notable for its late medieval Perpendicular fabric, a Norman font, and the alabaster tomb of Sir Robert Willoughby (d. 1502).

== History ==
St Mary's Church was consecrated in 1438, although the nave may be slightly earlier; it was originally a chapel of ease to St Sampson's Church in South Hill. Evidence of an earlier chapel on the site is recorded in 1384.

In the 15th century the building was enlarged with the addition of the tower, south aisle, south porch, north aisle, and clerestory, and the nave was heightened. The church fell into disrepair in the 19th century and was restored by J.P. St Aubyn in 1858, with a north aisle added by J. D. Sedding in 1882. The tower and bells were destroyed by fire in 1895.

The church was designated a Grade I listed building in 1968.

== Architecture ==
=== Structure and fabric ===
The church is built of ashlar granite and rubble with slate roofs and set-back buttresses. The nave and chancel share a continuous roof, while the south aisle has a lower separate roof and the north aisle continues in line with the chancel, later extended by a 19th-century vestry. Much 15th-century stonework was reused in the later north aisle. The tower has freestone dressings, corner turrets with pinnacles, and a battlemented parapet.

The windows are predominantly Perpendicular in style, many restored in the 19th century. The chancel east window is largely Victorian work incorporating earlier masonry, and small two-light clerestory windows light the nave from above.

=== Interior ===
Inside, the church preserves a medieval wagon roof to the nave, restored in the 20th century, together with arcades of the 15th century and a rood-stair turret in the south wall. Victorian restoration introduced reseating, screens, a reredos, pulpit, and other fittings, while retaining earlier features such as a Norman font and a piscina in the south aisle.

=== Fittings and monuments ===
The granite Altarnun-type font, dated by Sedding to between 1100 and 1130, may be the only surviving remnant of the earlier chapel. Notable monuments include the recumbent alabaster effigy of Sir Robert Willoughby (d. 1502) beneath the north arcade and a 15th-century brass to Nicholas Assheton and his family. Later memorials and stained glass in the north aisle commemorate local families and saints.

== Churchyard ==
St Mary's originally served as a chapel of ease to St Sampson's at South Hill, which remained the mother church. Following local concerns about the distance to South Hill, St Mary's Church was consecrated for burials in 1438.
