= Church of St Clement, Withiel =

Church in Withiel, Cornwall

Church of St Clement
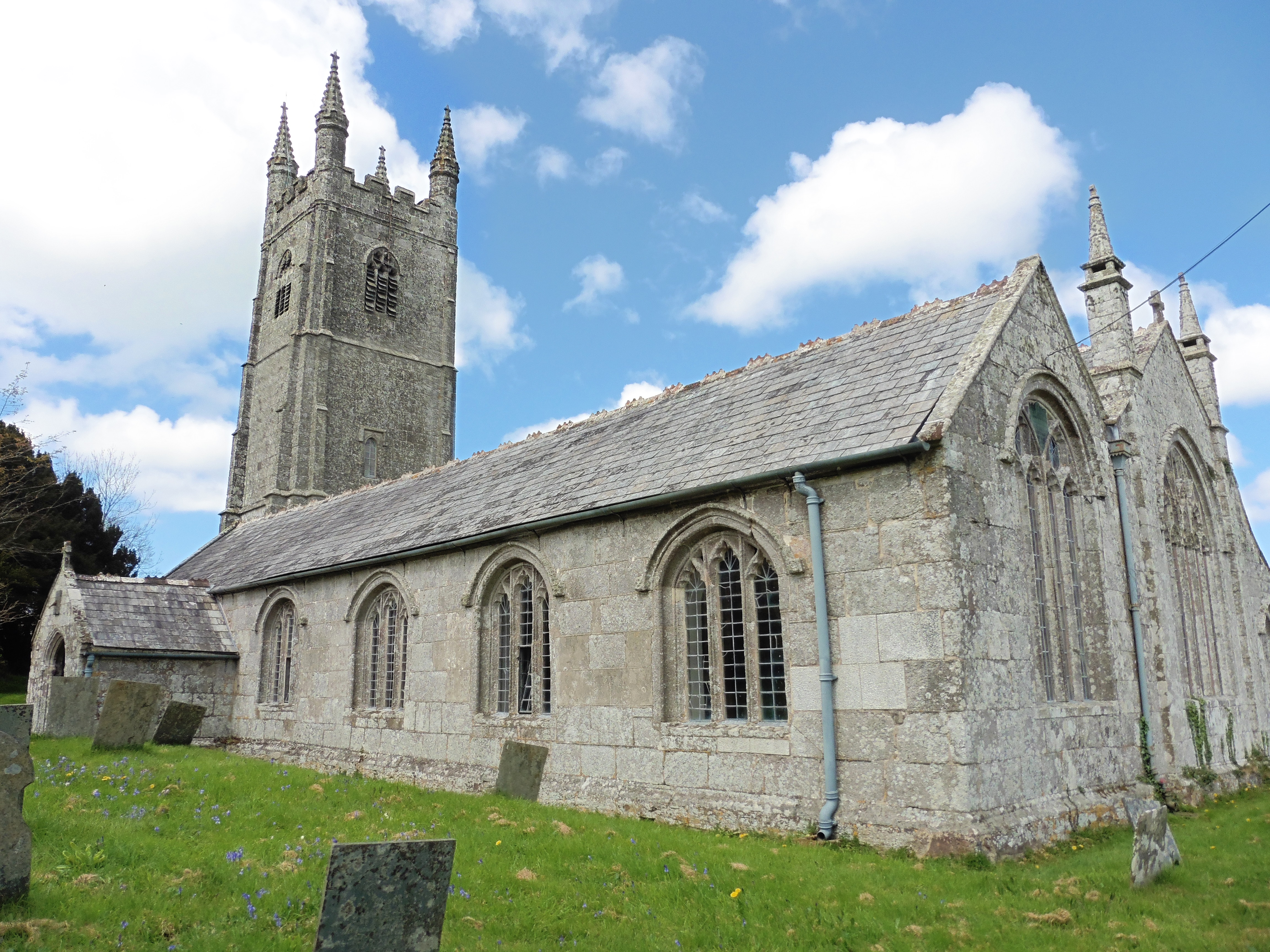
- Church of St Clement
- 50.45412°N 4.82697°W
- Location: Withiel, Cornwall
- Country: England
- Denomination: Church of England

Administration
- Diocese: Truro
- Deanery: Pydar

The Church of St Clement, Withiel is a Grade I listed parish church in the village of Withiel, Cornwall, England. The building dates to the 13th century, with the present nave and chancel dating largely from the 14th century and with later additions in the 15th and early 16th centuries. It was restored in the early 19th century and includes both medieval and later features.

== History ==
The Church has a 13th-century foundation. The nave and chancel probably date from the 14th century. The building was enlarged in the mid to late 15th century, when the north chancel aisle was added and the east end of the chancel rebuilt. Further additions in the later 15th century included the south aisle, south porch, and west tower. The church is dedicated to St Clement, a dedication recorded from 1478 and possibly associated with earlier clerical connections.

By the early 19th century the church had fallen into disrepair, and it underwent a major restoration around 1819–1820. This work included the addition of Gothic pinnacles and the refitting of the interior, when the aisles were fitted with ceilings and stone floors. Further restoration took place in the 19th century, including general repairs and alterations to the building.

== Architecture ==
=== Structure ===
The church is built of slatestone and granite rubble with granite dressings, while the south aisle, porch, and west tower are constructed in granite ashlar. The roofs are slate, with decorative ridge tiles and raised gables. The plan consists of a nave and chancel that form one continuous space, with a north chancel aisle, south aisle with porch, and a west tower. The north aisle to the chancel was added in the 15th century, when the chancel's east end was also rebuilt. The south aisle and porch were added later in the 15th century, followed by the west tower.

The west tower is of three stages with set-back buttresses and pinnacles. The south doorway, dating from the early to mid 16th century, is more ornate than most parish church doorways. The south porch contains an angel holy water stoup.

=== Interior ===
The interior combines plastered and exposed stonework: the south aisle walls are plastered, while the rest of the church is of visible stone rubble. The nave and chancel have early 19th-century wagon roofs with carved bosses. A tall, round-headed tower arch separates the nave from the tower. The nave has a six-bay south arcade and a three-bay north arcade, with moulded piers and pointed arches. A 19th-century wooden screen stands across the north arcade. Openings associated with the former rood loft are visible in both arcades.

=== Furnishings, fittings, and monuments ===
The church contains a late medieval font with an octagonal bowl and carved decoration. It is associated with the dedication to St Clement, whose symbol, the anchor, appears in the decoration. Most other fittings date from the 19th century, including wooden benches, a wooden pulpit, and a marble reredos. Decorative baptism boards from this period also survive.

The floor of the north aisle is paved with early 19th-century headstones. Monuments in the chancel include memorial tablets to Henry Vyvyan (d. 1811), Grace Phillipps (d. 1818), and Richard Frewren (d. 1792). Fragments of 15th-century stained glass survive in the east window of the south aisle, including a shield of arms and a bishop’s mitre. A coat of arms of Prior Vivian of Bodmin appears in the same window.
