= Portscatho =

Village in Cornwall, England

Coordinates: 50.179°N 4.974°W

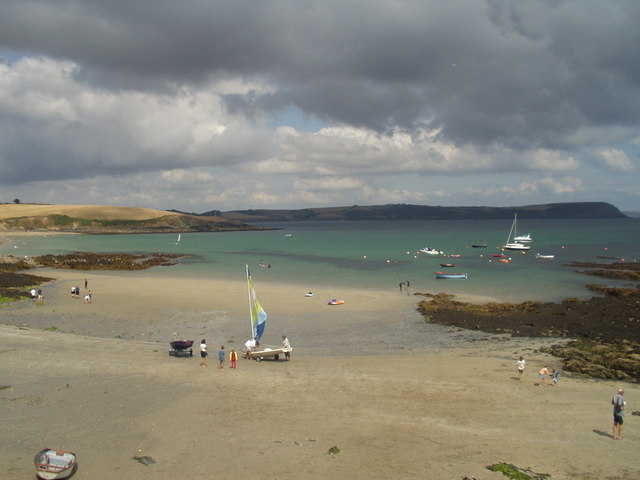
Portscatho beach

Portscatho (Cornish: Porthskathow) is a coastal village on the Roseland Peninsula in Cornwall, England, United Kingdom. The village adjoins Gerrans (the villages have almost merged into one but retain their identities) on the east side of the peninsula, about seven miles (11 km) south-southeast of Truro. It has an estimated population of 1,500 people.

Portscatho lies within the Cornwall Area of Outstanding Natural Beauty (AONB).

The name Portscatho comes from the Cornish language words porth, meaning 'harbour' or 'cove', and skathow, meaning 'boats'.

Portscatho is also known for the creation of the "portbomb", which combines ruby port with energy drink and is taken as a shot.

== Cornish wrestling ==
Cornish wrestling tournaments, for prizes, were held in Portscatho in the 1900s.
