= Penheale Manor =

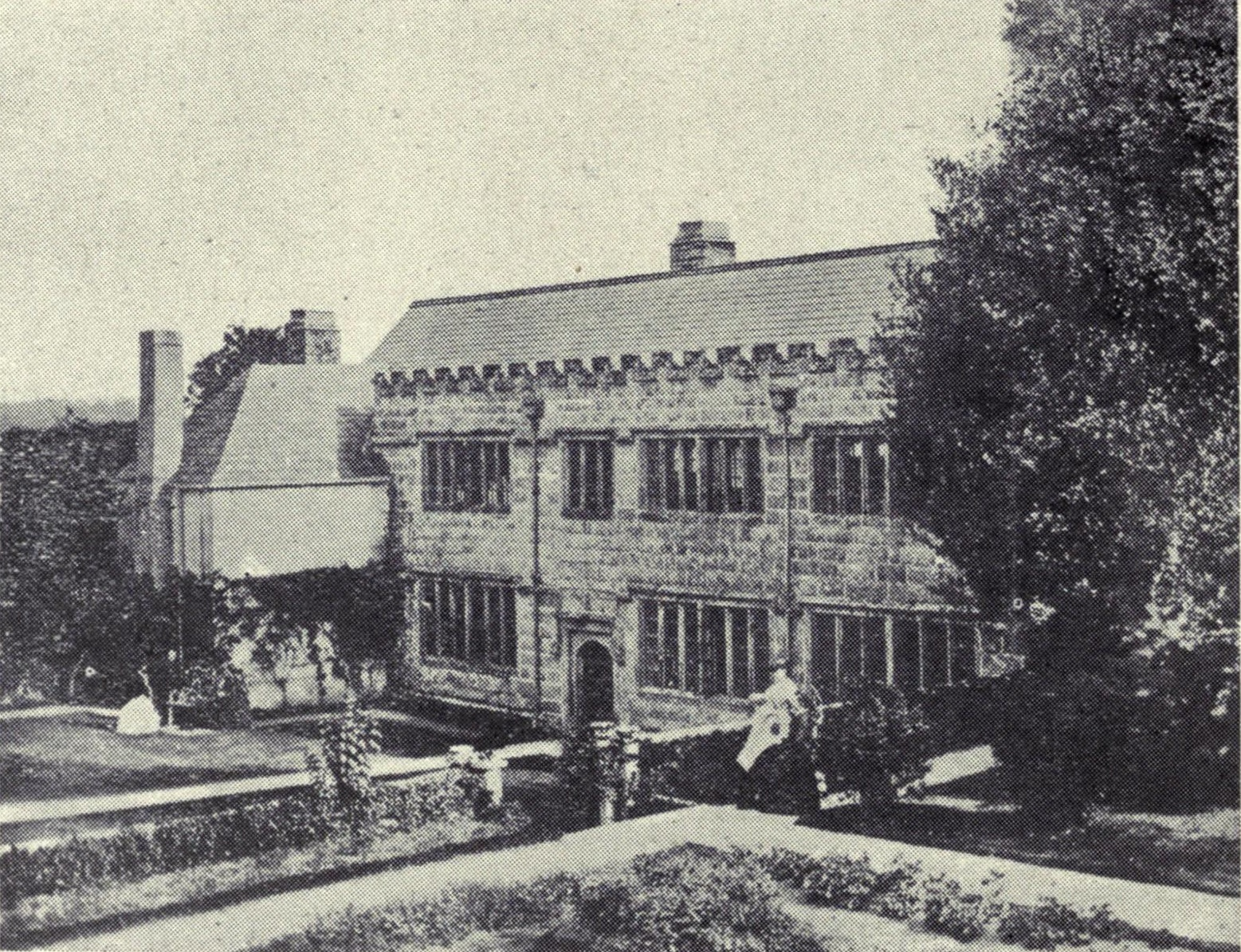
- Penheale Manor

- Location within Cornwall
- 50°39′58″N 4°27′06″W
- Type: Manor House
- Location: Penheale, Cornwall

Site notes
- Architect: Sir Edwin Lutyens
- Architectural styles: Jacobean and Arts and Crafts

Listed Building – Grade I
- Official name: Penheale Manor
- Designated: 1 December 1951
- Reference no.: 1160121

Listed Building – Grade I
- Official name: Gatehouse
- Designated: 22 November 1960
- Reference no.: 1142958

Listed Building – Grade I
- Official name: Stables
- Designated: 22 November 1960
- Reference no.: 1142918

Listed Building – Grade I
- Official name: Gate, gate-piers and garden wall to north east of Penheale Manor
- Designated: 11 January 1989
- Reference no.: 1160167

Listed Building – Grade II*
- Official name: Walled garden and pavilions to west of gatehouse and Penheale Manor
- Designated: 11 January 1989
- Reference no.: 1365636

National Register of Historic Parks and Gardens
- Official name: Penheale Manor
- Designated: 11 June 1987
- Reference no.: 1000653

Penheale Manor is a Grade I listed manor house and historic building one mile north of Egloskerry, Cornwall.

== History ==
The manor was mentioned as one of 284 manors in Cornwall by the Domesday Book of 1086. The current manor house occupies a medieval site, but was built in the early 17th century. It can be dated to c. 1620-1640 and was in the ownership of the Sheccot family. There were alterations in the 18th century.

The Rev. Henry Addington Simcoe, son of John Graves Simcoe, purchased the estate in 1830 and was curate of Egloskerry. He married twice and had eleven children, and wrote and published many books from his own printing press at Penheale.

Norman Colville purchased Penheale in the 1920s and made significant alterations, with the help of Sir Edwin Lutyens. His additions are largely to the south, and reportedly contain a stair of a similar design, but smaller scale, to that of Castle Drogo.

The manor is a Grade I listed building. The gatehouse, stables, and the gate, with its gatepiers and attached garden wall are also listed at Grade I.
