= St Andrew's Church, Stratton =

Coordinates: 50°49′51″N 4°30′48″W

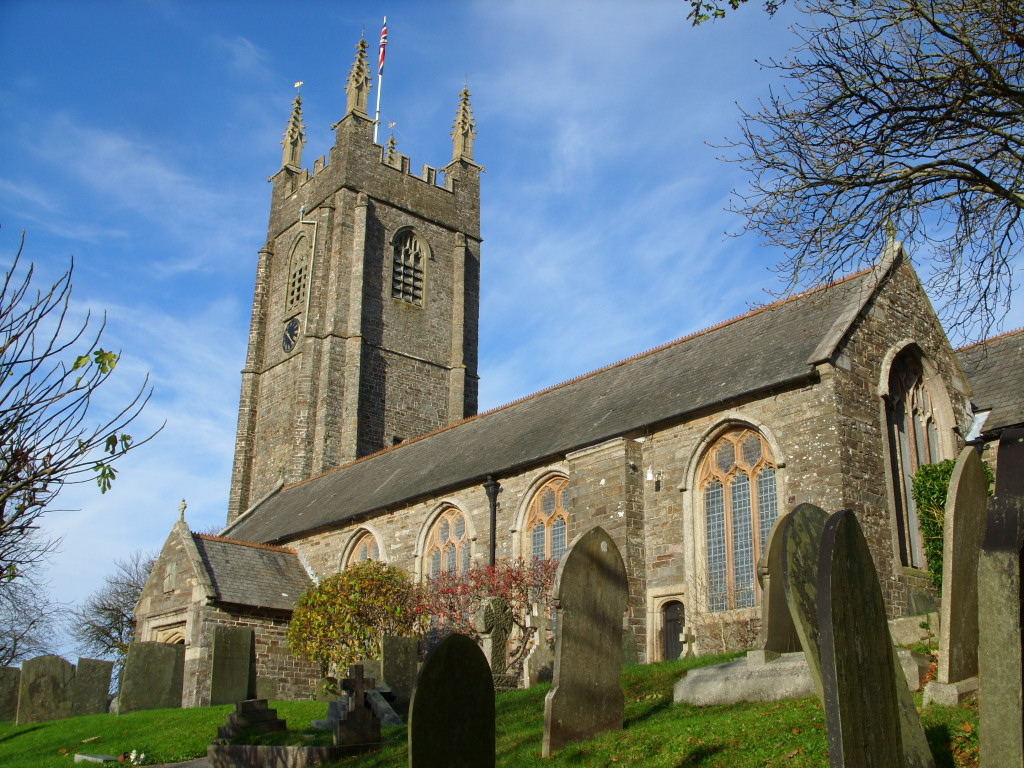
- Stratton church
- St Andrew's Church, Stratton
- Denomination: Church of England

History
- Dedication: St Andrew

Administration
- Province: Canterbury
- Diocese: Truro
- Archdeaconry: Bodmin
- Deanery: Stratton
- Parish: Bude-Stratton
- Location within Cornwall

Listed Building – Grade I
- Official name: Church of St Andrew
- Designated: 5 March 1952
- Reference no.: 1279033

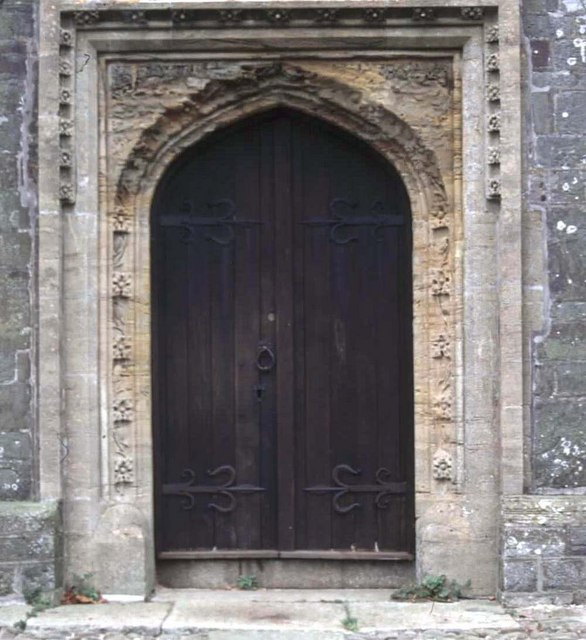
Church door

St Andrew's Church is a Grade I listed church in Stratton, Bude, Cornwall. It is located along the main road in Stratton. The font is dated to the 12th century, the north aisle to the mid 14th. The tower, aisle and chancel date to the 15th century. The church was restored in 1888 by St Aubyn and Wadling. It became a Grade I listed building on 5 March 1952.

== The church ==
The oldest part of the structure is the mid-fourteenth-century north aisle, with the south aisle, chancel and tower having been added in the fifteenth century. The font precedes these as it has been dated to the twelfth century. The vestry was added in the late nineteenth century and the church was restored and partially rebuilt by James Piers St Aubyn and Henry J. Wadling in 1888. The north aisle is constructed of rubble stone, the chancel, south aisle and tower is built of ashlar masonry and the south arcade is built of granite. The church is built in Perpendicular style except for the north arcade, which is built in Decorated style. The porch has granite coping and kneelers, and the moulded, arched granite outer doorway is set under a sundial in the gable.

Apart from the arcade, the interior walls are plastered. The roof is probably original and is of the open waggon type with carved ribs and bosses. The bowl of the font is twelfth century and it stands on a nineteenth-century base. The seventeenth century pulpit is five-sided, on a wineglass type stand; it has panels of round-headed blind arches. On the south side there is a stair to a former rood loft, and the rood screen dates to 1901. There are some good windows in the north aisle and tower.
