= St Mylor Church =

Church in Mylor Churchtown, Cornwall

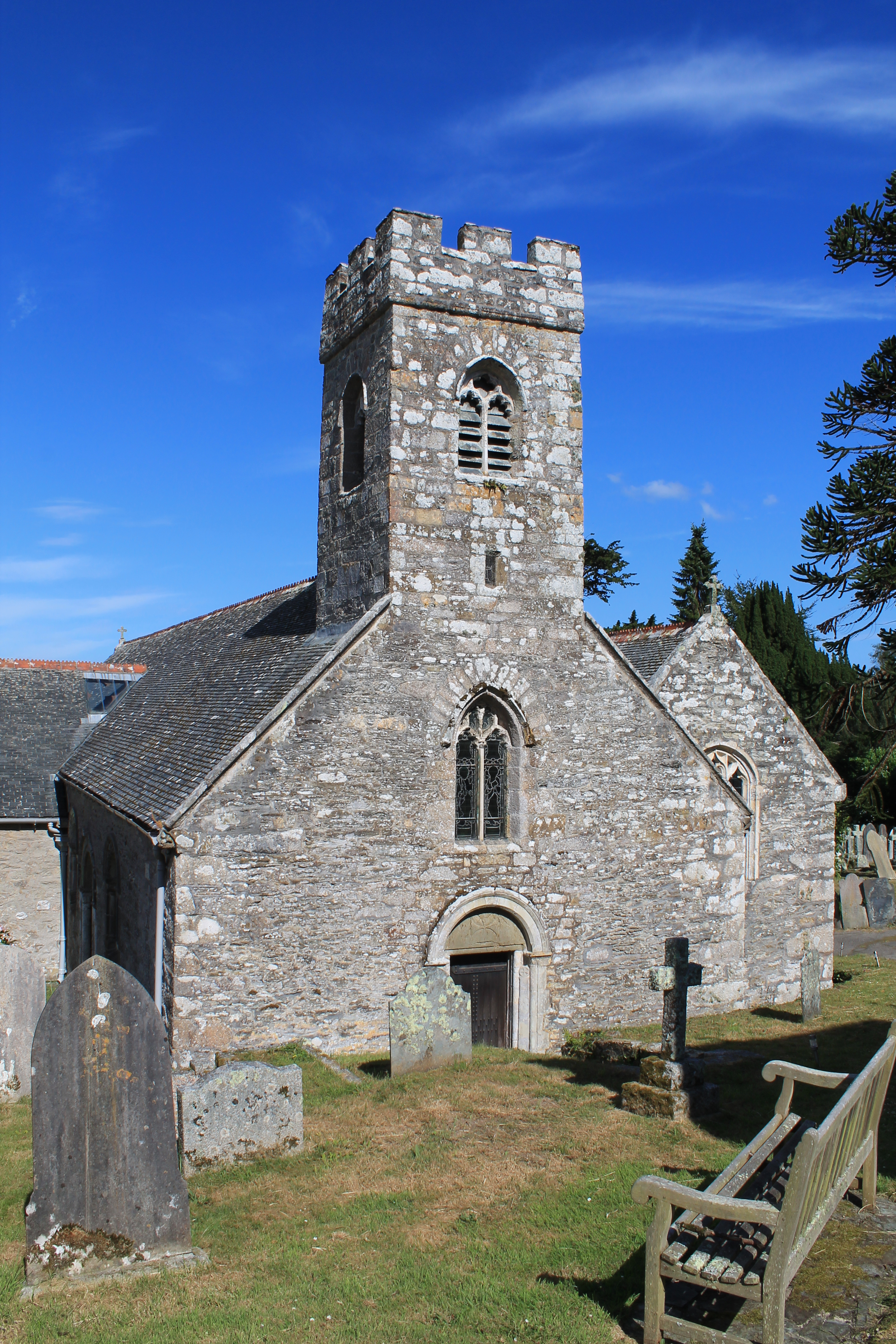
- St Mylor Church
- 50.177°N 5.0539°W
- Location: Mylor Churchtown, Cornwall
- Country: England
- Denomination: Church of England

Administration
- Diocese: Truro

St Mylor Church is a Grade I listed parish church in Mylor Churchtown, Cornwall, England. The building dates from the 12th century, with substantial rebuilding in the 15th century and restoration in 1870. It retains Norman features, including carved doorways, together with later Perpendicular work, a detached campanile, and a notable medieval rood screen base.

== History ==
A church was established on the site in the 12th century, and elements of Norman fabric remain. The original building appears to have been cruciform, comprising a nave and chancel under one roof with north and south transepts. In the 15th century the church was substantially rebuilt: the south transept was removed and replaced by a south aisle with chapel, and a Caen stone arcade was inserted between the nave and aisle. A bell turret was added over the west gable, together with a north rood stair turret and south porch.

The church was extensively restored in 1870, when parts of the north and east walls were rebuilt, windows were reset, the roofs renewed, and a sacristy added.

The church was designated a Grade I listed building in 1967.

== Architecture ==
=== Structure and fabric ===
The church is constructed of local shale rubble with granite quoins and copings, and Caen stone dressings. The roofs are of scantle slate with coped gable ends. The west front retains a Norman round-headed doorway incorporating original 12th-century bases, roll mouldings, nook shafts, and a carved tympanum. Above it is a 15th-century three-light Perpendicular window, and the gable is topped by a large embattled bell turret with two-light openings.

On the north wall is a well-preserved Norman doorway with chevron ornament and carved tympanum. The north transept, largely rebuilt in the 15th century, has a three-light Perpendicular window. The chancel and aisle windows are largely 15th-century Perpendicular, though some were replaced or restored in the 19th century. The south porch doorway, dating from the late 15th or early 16th century, is a notable example of late Perpendicular work, with panelled jambs and moulded arch.

=== Interior ===
The interior follows the typical Cornish plan of a nave with a single aisle to the south. A six-bay Perpendicular Caen stone arcade separates the nave from the south aisle and chapel and continues into the chancel, with granite responds and moulded arches. Two rood doorways survive in the north wall and in the adjacent pier between the nave and chancel. At the east end of the arcade is a squint with a piscina, and an aumbry in set in the east wall of the aisle chapel. Norman fragments are incorporated into niches in the north transept.

The present arch-braced pitch pine roofs date from circa 1870 and replaced earlier oak wagon roofs. Several windows contain 19th-century coloured glass.

=== Furnishings and monuments ===
The church retains a medieval font with an octagonal granite bowl, possibly of the 15th century, set on a 13th-century turned base. The base of the rood screen, dating from the late 15th or early 16th century, survives in reassembled form and includes a screen dado of coloured panels with floral decoration; it is carved in an early Renaissance style and retains traces of original paint. Two 16th-century oak bench ends are incorporated into the fronts of the choir stalls.

The oak pulpit dates from the 16th century and has carved rails, stiles, muntins, panels, and a moulded cornice. Other fittings include a priest's chair assembled from reused medieval fragments, painted Royal Arms of Queen Anne in the south transept, a painted letter of Charles I formerly at Sudeley Castle near the south door, and old oak parish stocks in the porch. The pews are 19th-century pitch pine. A later addition is a screen between the sanctuary and the Lady Chapel commemorating the thirty-one people who died in the MV Darlwyne disaster of 1966.

The south chapel contains a monument commemorating Francis Trefusis (d. 1680) and includes a Latin inscription. Further wall monuments in the south transept include a 1695 monument to Richard Bonython of Carclew and his wife Honor.

== Churchyard ==
A Celtic cross, known as the Cross of St Mylor, is adjacent to the entrance to the porch and is 17’6” in height, seven feet of which are buried. It was formerly buried and used as a buttress against the south wall of the church.

The Ganges memorial records the names of fifty-two boys who died during naval training aboard HMS Ganges, anchored off the dockyard from 1866 to 1896.
