= Church of St Gerrans =

Church in Gerrans, Cornwall

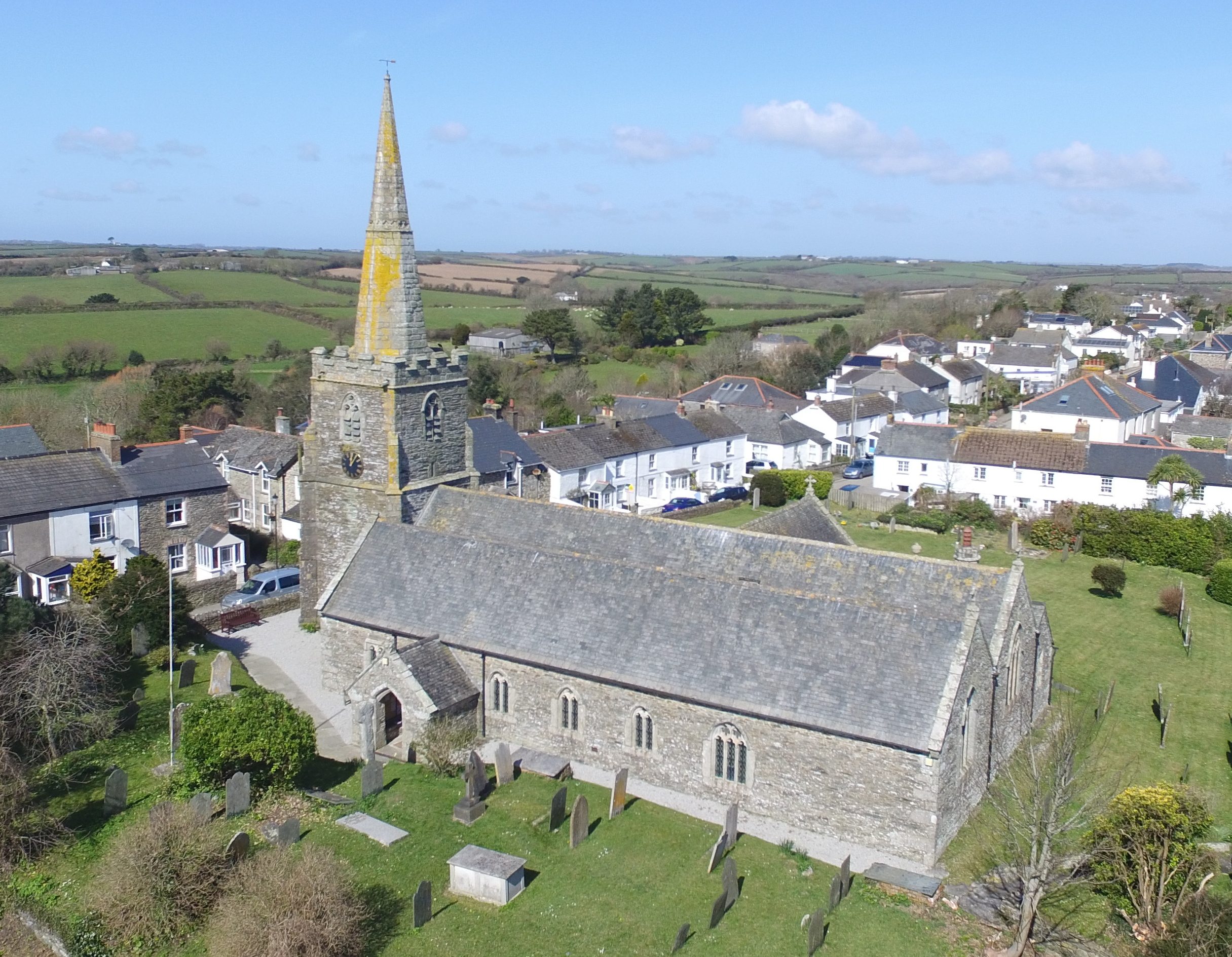
- Church of St Gerrans
- 50.17851°N 4.9810°W
- Location: Gerrans, Cornwall
- Country: England
- Denomination: Church of England

Administration
- Diocese: Truro
- Deanery: Powder

The Church of St Gerrans is a Grade I listed medieval parish church in the village of Gerrans, Cornwall, England. It dates from the 13th century, with some original surviving features, and was enlarged in the 15th century with the construction of its west tower and south aisle. The church was damaged by fire in 1848 and restored in 1850–51. It retains notable Perpendicular features, including a tall granite spire, and remains a prominent landmark in the parish.

== History ==
St Gerrans Church dates from the 13th century; the first recorded rector appears in 1260. The church stands prominently on a hill overlooking the sea. Parts of the 13th-century building survive in the north wall of the nave and in the north transept. The church was enlarged in the 15th century, when the west tower was built and the south aisle and porch were added.

The tower spire was restored in 1636 and is said to have served as a navigation mark for local fishermen. The church is traditionally associated with St Geraint, a Cornish ruler of the 8th century, whose name is thought to be the origin of “Gerrans”.

The building was damaged by fire in 1848 and restored in 1850–51. A vestry north of the chancel was added about 1850. Later work included rebuilding parts of the south aisle above window level and renewing the tracery in several windows. The chancel east window contains tracery and glass of 1906, and clock faces were added to the tower in 1911.

== Architecture ==
=== Structure ===
The church is built of slatestone rubble with granite and freestone dressings, under Delabole slate roofs. It comprises a nave and chancel under one roof, with a west tower, north transept, south aisle, porch, and a vestry north of the chancel. The north wall of the nave retains 13th-century fabric, including lancet windows and a later medieval doorway. The north transept, partly rebuilt in the 15th century, has a two-light window in the north gable and a reset 13th-century window in the east wall.

The 15th-century west tower is of two stages with diagonal buttresses, a battlemented parapet, and a tall octagonal granite spire restored in 1636. The moulded granite west doorway lies beneath a three-light Perpendicular window, and the bell stage has two-light openings with trefoil-headed lights and slate louvres.

The south aisle, largely 15th century, contains Perpendicular windows including a three-light east window; parts of the walling were rebuilt in the 19th century. The south porch incorporates reused medieval granite elements and carved oak wall-plates.

=== Interior ===
The interior has a seven-bay granite arcade with moulded piers and four-centred arches separating the nave from the south aisle. The roof structure is largely 19th century but includes reused medieval timbers. Built-in stone benches survive in the north transept and south aisle.

=== Furnishings and monuments ===
Medieval fittings include an aumbry (a cupboard for storing shared vessels) in the chancel and a trefoil-headed piscina in the south wall. A surviving Norman font holds a square top decorated with arcading and a round bowl on a central column with corner shafts. Six carved oak bench ends from the early 16th century survive, decorated with tracery and shields; two include carved pomegranates, a symbol associated with Catherine of Aragon. The remaining seating and fittings are largely 19th century, including a polygonal oak pulpit and choir stalls.

Monuments include a 13th-century sepulchral coffin slab with a quatrefoil-headed cross in the north transept, and a Baroque marble memorial to Edward Hobbs, located on the north wall at the east end of the south aisle.
