= Newton Ferrers House =

Grade I country house in Cornwall, England

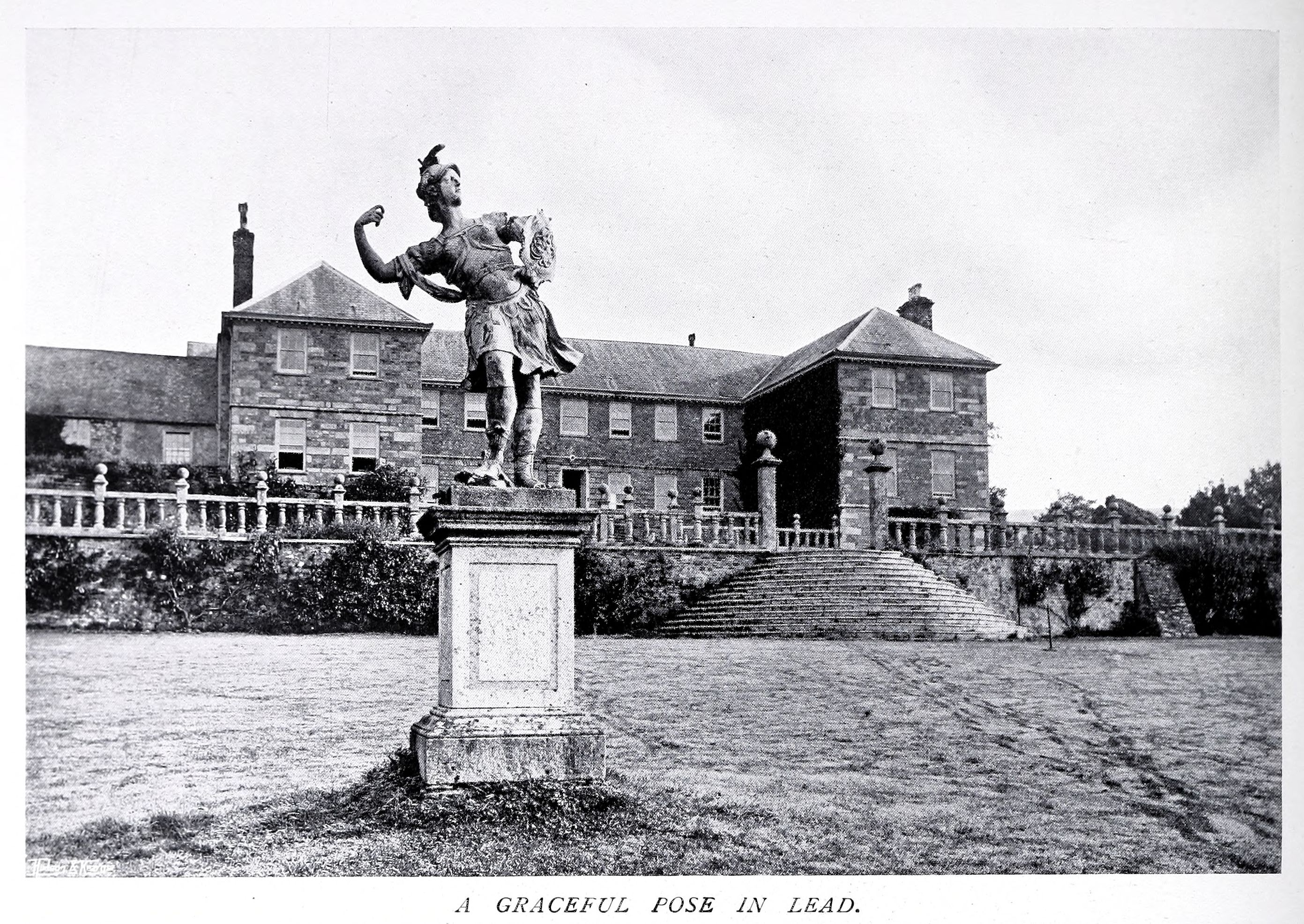
- View of the house from the terrace

- Location within Cornwall
- 50.4695°N 4.331°W
- Type: Country House
- Location: Newton Ferrers, St Mellion, Cornwall

History
- Built: 1685-95
- Built by: Sir William Coryton, 3rd Baronet

Site notes
- Architectural style: Restoration style
- Governing body: Privately owned

Listed Building – Grade I
- Official name: Newton Ferrers House
- Designated: 21 July 1951
- Reference no.: 1140810

Listed Building – Grade I
- Official name: Gatepiers and garden wall to the south-west of Newton Ferrers House
- Designated: 26 November 1985
- Reference no.: 1277594

Listed Building – Grade I
- Official name: Gatepiers and garden wall to the south-east of Newton Ferrers House
- Designated: 26 November 1985
- Reference no.: 1140812

Listed Building – Grade I
- Official name: Gatepiers to the south of Newton Ferrers House
- Designated: 26 November 1985
- Reference no.: 1140813

Listed Building – Grade I
- Official name: Terrace to the south of Newton Ferrers House
- Designated: 21 July 1951
- Reference no.: 1312304

Listed Building – Grade II*
- Official name: Two statues on the terrace to the south of Newton Ferrers House
- Designated: 21 July 1951
- Reference no.: 1137482

Newton Ferrers House, Newton Ferrers, St Mellion, Cornwall, was built by Sir William Coryton, a lawyer and politician. The house was built between 1685 and 1695 and was one of the earliest in Cornwall to move from a Tudor to a Classical style. A private house, it is a Grade I listed building.

== History ==
William Cortyon was a lawyer who entered politics after the death of his elder brother John in 1690. As well as inheriting his brother's parliamentary seat, the rotten borough of Callington, he succeeded to the family estate of Newton Ferrers. At around this time, he undertook the building of a new house on the estate, rejecting the traditional inspiration of the county's many Medieval and Tudor manor houses in favour of the Restoration style. The mansion replaced an earlier such house which had stood on an adjacent site prior to its demolition.

The direct Coryton line died out in the 18th century and in the 1880s the house was restored by Sir Digby Collins, who served as High Sheriff of Cornwall in 1887. In 1940 a disastrous fire gutted over half of the house, including the whole of the west wing. This was left unrestored in a partial reconstruction in the 1950s. In the late 1990s, a complete rebuilding of the entire house was undertaken. Newton Ferrers remains a private residence and is not open to the public.

== Architecture and description ==
The house is of two storeys with a basement. The building material is local granite, with a slate roof. This was originally all to a hipped design but that covering the central block was subsequently replaced with a flat roof and parapet. One of the earliest in Cornwall to be built to a Classical design, Coryton's unknown architect adopted a Restoration style H-plan, with small adjoining wings. The main interior rooms are laid out on a piano nobile, with the saloon occupying the three central bays of the south front. The gardens to the south of the house descend in a series of contemporary terraces into the valley of the River Lynher.

=== Historic listing designations ===
Newton Ferrers House is listed at Grade I on Historic England's National Heritage Record. Three sets of gatepiers and walls are also listed at Grade I. The terrace to the south of the house has its own Grade I listing, and a pair of statues set on it are listed at Grade II*. (Note: The statues, cast in lead and likely 18th century in date, depict Roman soldiers.) The wider estate contains a further nine designated structures, all listed at Grade II. These include a range of ancillary buildings; the stables, a barn, a bakehouse, a garage and a well-house; a further set of garden walls to the north-east; and three further statues on the terraces. (Note: The statue on a hill some 400m south-east of the house is medieval in date and depicts the Roman god Janus. It was discovered under the floor of the servants' hall during Sir Digby Collins' restoration of the 1880s.)

== Sources ==
- Beacham, Peter; Pevsner, Nikolaus (2014). Cornwall. The Buildings of England. New Haven, US and London: Yale University Press. ISBN 978-0-300-12668-6.
- Lawson-Jones, Anna (2014). Newton Ferrers, St Mellion, Cornwall: Archaeological assessment of proposed solar farm (PDF). Cornwall County Council.
