= St Michael's Church, Landrake =

Church in Landrake, Cornwall

St Michael's Church
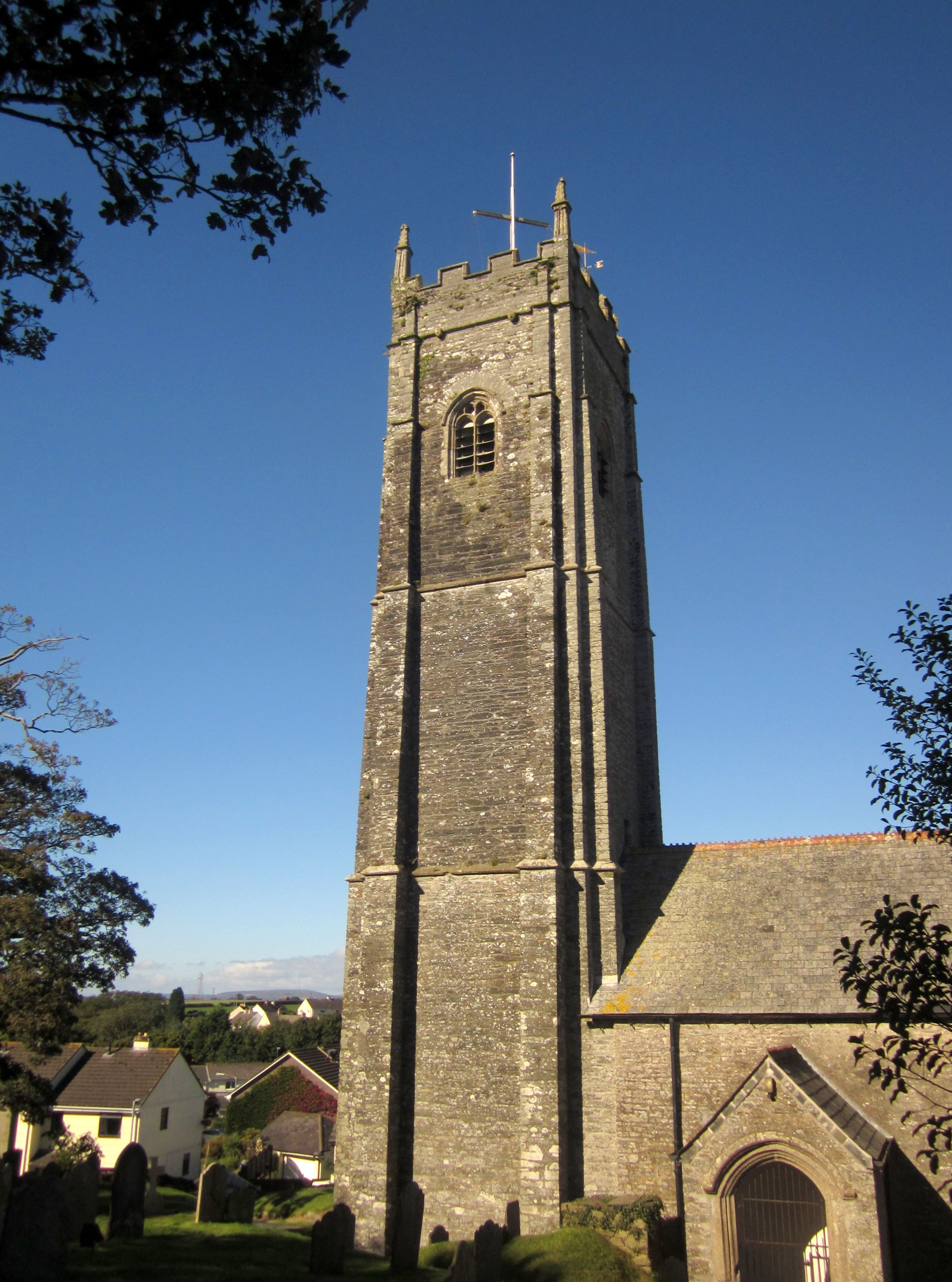
- St Michael's Church
- 50.42132°N 4.29067°W
- Location: Landrake, Cornwall
- Country: England
- Denomination: Church of England

Administration
- Diocese: Truro
- Deanery: East Wivelshire

St Michael's Church is a Grade I listed parish church in Landrake, a village in south-east Cornwall, England. The church includes some 13th-century stonework, but most of the present building dates from rebuilding and expansion in the late 14th and 15th centuries in the Perpendicular Gothic style. The north aisle, south transept and west tower were added during this period. The church was restored in the late 19th century.

== History ==
The earliest recorded reference to a church at Landrake dates from 1018, when King Cnut granted land to Bishop Burhwold, after which it was to pass to St Germans Priory. This established a connection with the priory at St Germans, whose clergy served the church. The Domesday Book of 1086 records a timber church at Landrake, probably of Anglo-Saxon origin. The present stone church was begun later and consecrated in 1269. Elements of the early building survive, including parts of the south doorway and nave, and a font dated to about 1100.

The church was largely rebuilt and enlarged in the late 14th and 15th centuries, when the nave and chancel were altered and the west tower, north aisle, north porch, and south transept were added.

The church underwent restoration in the late 19th century, when windows were altered or replaced and the roofs were renewed. It has long shared a priest with the neighbouring parish of St Erney.

== Architecture ==
=== Structure ===
St Michael's Church is built of slatestone rubble with granite and greenstone dressings and has slate roofs with crested ridge tiles. The building is primarily in the Perpendicular Gothic style. The nave and chancel form one continuous space, with a west tower, a north aisle with north porch, a south transept, and a south porch. The chancel is supported by angled buttresses.

The east end of the chancel has a 15th-century three-light window with a four-centred arch and cusped tracery. The south side of the nave and chancel contains three-light windows inserted during the 19th-century restoration. The gabled south porch has a granite outer doorway with a four-centred arch and moulded surround. The inner doorway has a pointed arch and probably dates from the 13th century. The north aisle has four bays with diagonal buttresses and three-light Perpendicular windows. A shallow north porch projects from the western bay and is decorated with pinnacles, carved masks and a moulded doorway with quatrefoil ornament.

The west tower is of three stages with set-back buttresses, string courses and an embattled parapet. An octagonal stair turret rises on the north side. The tower has a west doorway with a moulded granite arch and a three-light window above. At the bell stage, each side has a two-light opening, and the parapet is decorated with mask gargoyles and pinnacles.

=== Interior ===
The interior walls are plastered. The nave and chancel have 19th-century wagon roofs, with nine bays over the nave and four over the chancel. The north aisle retains a 15th-century wagon roof with moulded ribs, restored in the 19th century. A four-bay arcade separates the nave from the north aisle. The south transept opens to the nave through a tall four-centred arch and has its own wagon roof. A blocked opening for the former rood stair is visible on the south side of the chancel.

=== Furnishings, monuments and glass ===
The chancel contains several memorials, including a monumental brass to Edward Courtenay, Lord of Wotton (d. 1509), and a pair of slate monuments dated 1607 to Nicholas Mylls and his wife, with carved figures and decorative strapwork. The most notable fitting is a 12th-century granite font in the nave, with a square bowl on an octagonal base and carved rosettes. Other furnishings date largely from the 19th-century restoration and include a stone pulpit in the nave, a marble reredos in the chancel, and wooden benches in the nave, aisle and transept. The benches in the chancel have carved poppy-head ends.

The east window of the chancel contains stained glass dated 1866, and the south window has stained glass of 1887. Other windows contain later stained glass or plain glazing.
