= Church of St Leonard and St Dilpe =

Church in Landulph, Cornwall

St Leonard and St Dilpe
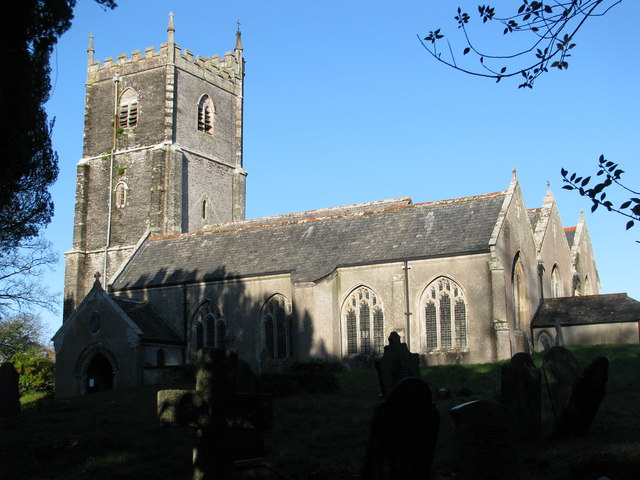
- St Leonard and St Dilpe
- 50.43255°N 4.21061°W
- Location: Landulph, Cornwall
- Country: England
- Denomination: Church of England

Administration
- Diocese: Truro
- Deanery: East Wilveshire

The Church of St Leonard and St Dilpe is a Grade I listed parish church in Landulph, a village in south-east Cornwall, England. The church was probably built in the 14th century on an earlier foundation and was enlarged in the 15th century with the addition of the tower, aisles, and south porch. It was restored in the late 19th century, when the nave roof was raised to form a clerestory.

== History ==
The church was likely built in the 14th century on the foundation of an earlier foundation. It stands in an oval churchyard of Celtic origin, known as a “lan,” near the River Tamar. The west tower was added in the early 15th century, and the north and south aisles, together with the south porch, were added in the late 15th century. The church is dedicated to St. Dilpe, possibly identified with St. Dylic, and to St. Leonard, whose dedication was added in the Middle Ages.

The church was restored in the late 19th century, when the nave roof was rebuilt and raised to form a clerestory, and a vestry was added to the east of the south aisle.

== Architecture ==
=== Structure ===
The church is built of stone with slate roofs, and consists of a nave and chancel in one continuous space, with a west tower, north and south aisles, and a south porch. The chancel has a 19th-century three-light east window in the Perpendicular style. The aisles retain 15th-century windows with cusped lights and tracery, and are supported by buttresses. The north aisle has four bays and the south aisle has five bays, with the south porch in the western bay. A projecting rood stair turret rises from the south side of the aisle.

The gabled south porch has a moulded doorway with a four-centred arch. The inner doorway also has a four-centred arch with moulded details. The west tower is of three stages with buttresses and an embattled parapet with pinnacles. The tower has a west doorway with a moulded arch and a 15th-century window above, and two-light openings at the bell stage.

=== Interior ===
The interior has plastered walls and slate floors. The nave and chancel have 19th-century wagon roofs with clerestory windows above. The north and south aisles also have wagon roofs, rebuilt in the 19th century using earlier carved bosses; in the south aisle, some original timbers survive. Arcades of five bays separate the nave from the aisles, with octagonal piers and four-centred arches. Corbels from an earlier roof and chancel arch remain visible.

=== Furnishings, monuments and glass ===
The chancel contains a piscina and aumbry, and a rood screen made in 1929 incorporating elements of a 15th-century screen. The font may date to the Norman period. It is placed on an octagonal stone surround dated 1660 with carved inscriptions. The aisles retain 15th-century bench ends, and the south aisle contains an 18th-century alms box. At the west end is carved panelling dated 1631, formerly part of the Lower family’s box pew. Memorials include a chest tomb to Sir Nicholas Lower (d. 1655), carved with a coat of arms and unicorn crest.

Fragments of medieval stained glass survive in a south aisle window, including shields of arms and the unicorn crest of the Lower family.
