= Greystone Bridge =

Greystone Bridge Pons Meynloos
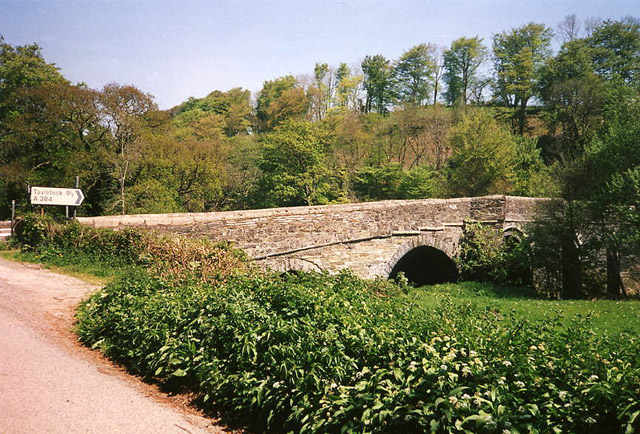
- Greystone Bridge in 1995
- Coordinates: 50.599931°N 4.306952°W
- Carries: B3362
- Crosses: River Tamar
- Locale: Lezant, Cornwall/Bradstone, Devon, England

Characteristics
- Width: 3 metres (9.8 ft)
- Longest span: 7 metres (23 ft)

History
- Construction end: 1439

Statistics
- Toll: No
- Location within Cornwall

Listed Building – Grade I
- Designated: 21 March 1967
- Reference no.: 1104822

Location
- Interactive map of Greystone Bridge

Greystone Bridge (Cornish: Pons Meynloos) is a four-arch Grade I listed bridge over the River Tamar south-east of Launceston, Cornwall. It was built in 1439 and repaired in November 2007.

== Description ==
Greystone Bridge is south-east of Launceston, Cornwall and carries the B3362 over the River Tamar. It is faced in stone with a dressing of freestone. The road is 3 metres (9.8 ft) wide and the bridge's cutwaters extend up to 8.2 metres (27 ft) up from the river's bed; there is a footpath for use by pedestrians. The bridge has four segmental arches and two floodwater arches measured at 4.3 metres (14 ft) on each bank.

== History ==
Greystone Bridge was built under an indulgence of 40 days granted to all penitents by Bishop Lacy of Exeter on 27 December 1439. Greystone Bridge and the Horsebridge, also over the Tamar, are thought to have been built by the same person. The patron of the bridge is thought to have been an Abbot of Tavistock. Long vehicles often damaged its parapet and repair work was carried out in November 2007, which also widened its entry approach on the Cornwall end, and traffic signals were replaced. Greystone Bridge is currently protected as a Grade I listed structure and a scheduled ancient monument.
