= Church of St Wyllow, Lanteglos-by-Fowey =

Church in Lanteglos-by-Fowey, Cornwall

St Wyllow
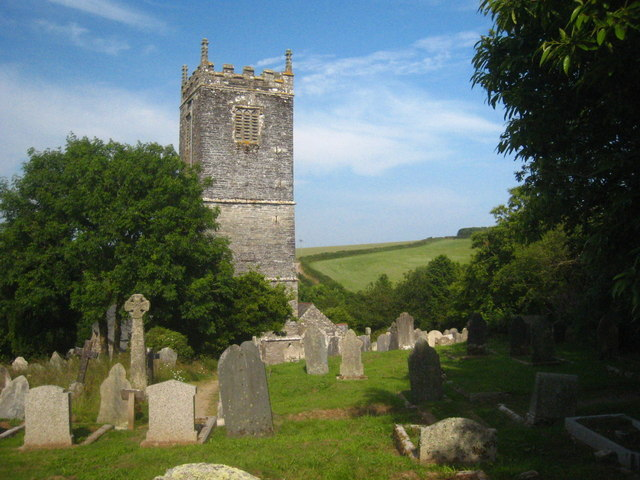
- St Wyllow
- 50.33432°N 4.60848°W
- Location: Lanteglos-by-Fowey
- Country: England
- Denomination: Church of England

Administration
- Diocese: Truro
- Archdeaconry: Bodmin
- Deanery: West Wivelshire

St Wyllow's Church is a Grade I listed parish church in Lanteglos-by-Fowey, Cornwall, England. The building has Norman origins and was largely rebuilt in the late 14th and 15th centuries in the Perpendicular Gothic style. It retains 12th-century features and a 13th-century font, as well as an extensive collection of late medieval carved bench ends. The churchyard contains a 14th-century lantern cross. The church was restored in 1906 by the architect Edmund Sedding.

== History ==
St Wyllow's Church dates to the Norman period, with surviving 12th-century details in the jambs of the south doorway and tower arches. A stone set in the main doorway, bearing a carved Chi-Rho symbol, has been dated to the 8th century. The present church dates mostly to the late 14th century when the tower, nave, and north arcade were added. The south arcade was added in the 15th century. The porch possibly dates to the 17th century.

Much of the present church dates from the early Perpendicular Gothic period. It was restored in 1906 by architect Edmund Sedding.

British author Daphne du Maurier was married at St Wyllow's church in 1932. The church was inspiration for Lanoc Church in her first novel, 'The Loving Spirit'.

The church was designated a Grade I listed building in 1964.

== Architecture ==
=== Structure and fabric ===
The church is constructed of slatestone ashlar with granite dressings and a slate roof. It comprises a chancel, nave, and north and south aisles, with the nave and chancel under a single roof. The aisles extend westward to the end of the chancel, and the exterior is supported by buttresses to both aisles.

Most of the windows are Perpendicular in style, with alterations carried out during the 19th century, notably to the east window. The west tower rises to 70 feet and is built in four stages, supported on four piers. It is unbuttressed and finished with a battlemented parapet and crocketed finials. The tower contains a west window with later tracery and cusped belfry openings fitted with slate louvres. A gabled south porch includes a chamfered arch and a sundial set above it. Inside is a round-headed holy-water stoup, and the south doorway retains three carved crosses on its jambs. The belfry houses six bells.

=== Interior ===
Late medieval wagon roofs with decorative carved bosses cover the nave and aisles. The arcades have five bays with octagonal piers of Pentewan stone; the north arcade dates from the 14th century and the south arcade from the 15th century. A tower arch opens into the nave and adjoining aisles. Surviving late medieval features include rood-loft stairs in the south aisle, piscinas in the Lady Chapel and chancel, and alabaster panel depicting the martyrdom of St Lawrence.

=== Monuments, glass, furnishings, and fittings ===
The church features an extensive collection of carved bench ends, and fragments of earlier carpentry were incorporated into restoration carried out by Sedding in 1900. The woodwork includes heraldic devices, foliage, and profile heads. The choir stalls were designed by the Victorian woodcarvers the Pinwill sisters of Plymouth. In the south aisle are the former parish stocks, and panels from the box pews that once lined the nave are set against the walls, carved with the coats of arms of notable families of the parish.

Among the fittings is a carved oak altar table dated 1634. The 13th-century font, with Purbeck marble shafts and leaf carving, has an octagonal hollowed bowl, an uncommon form in Cornwall. It is fitted with a carved cover dating from the 1906 restoration.

The late 15th-century tomb chest of Thomas Mohun stands in the south chancel aisle and memorial brasses in the Lady Chapel, formerly the Mohun family chapel. The brass of Thomas de Mohun (d. 1440) shows the knight in armour with his feet resting on a lion. Another brass to Thomas Mohun (d. 1400) survives along the south wall, and his tomb retains traces of wall painting, possibly representing the Resurrection.

Fragments of medieval glass survive in the aisle windows, together with 19th-century stained glass, including windows by C. E. Kempe and Co.

== Churchyard ==
A well-preserved 14th-century cross sits in the churchyard. The cross, standing on a circular millwheel base, has a lantern head carved with decorative figures set under canopies. One face depicts a Crucifixion scene between figures of saints, possibly St Peter and St Paul. It was discovered buried in a trench at the west end of the church in 1838, and has been suggested to have been concealed during the Reformation.
