= Church of St Meubred =

Church in Cardinham, Cornwall

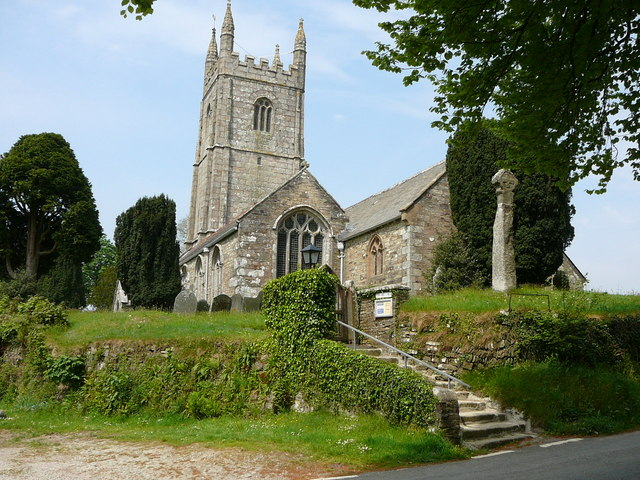
- Church of St Meubred
- 50.487925°N 4.647332°W
- Location: Cardinham
- Country: England
- Denomination: Church of England

Administration
- Diocese: Truro
- Archdeaconry: Bodmin
- Deanery: Trigg Minor & Bodmin
- Parish: Cardinham

The Church of St Meubred is a Grade I listed parish church in the village of Cardinham, Cornwall. Dating from the 15th century, with later restorations, mainly in the 19th century, the church retains many original architectural features. The churchyard contains two medieval crosses that were formerly built into the fabric of the church. They were both restored in 1872 and placed in the churchyard.

== History ==
The parish church was built on the site of an earlier chapel dedicated in 1085 to St Mewbredus the Martyr. The present building dates primarily from the 15th century, with later restorations. The chancel was restored in the late 19th century, when a north vestry was added.

In 1942, during the Second World War, the chancel windows were badly damaged by German bombing, and were later replaced with stained glass by Christopher Webb.

The church was designated a Grade I listed building in 1969.

== Architecture ==
St Meubred's Church is built of local slatestone rubble with granite detailing, with the south porch and west tower constructed in granite ashlar. It has slate roofs with decorative ridge tiles over the nave and chancel. The church has a simple medieval plan, with a combined nave and chancel, flanked by north and south aisles, a south porch, a north vestry, and a three-stage west tower. From the outside, the nave is mostly hidden by the aisles.

The chancel is lit by a large multi-light Perpendicular east window, while the aisles contain similar medieval windows. The gabled south porch features a sundial dated 1739 above its entrance. Inside the porch is a 15th-century wooden roof with carved supporting beams and decorative bosses.

The interior features a number of medieval stone fittings, including seating for clergy in the chancel, a piscina, an aumbry, and a tomb recess. A reused carved stone associated with the dedication to St Meubred is incorporated into the chancel fabric. The nave and aisles retain well-preserved medieval wagon roofs with carved bosses, including a Green Man motif.

The west tower consists of three stages, with weathered buttresses and an embattled parapet. The west doorway and window are decorated with carved granite panels featuring quatrefoils, stars, and heraldic designs.

Historic furnishings and monuments include a medieval stone font, 15th-century carved bench ends, and a plaster coat of arms of Charles II dated 1661. A painted letter of thanks from Charles I, dating to 1643, also survives. Memorials include a brass to Thomas Awmarle, rector (c. 1400), as well as slate, marble, and painted monuments from the 17th to 19th centuries. On the south side of the chancel is a 14th-century Easter sepulchre, sometimes identified as the tomb of St Meubred, with a carved niche above.

== Churchyard ==
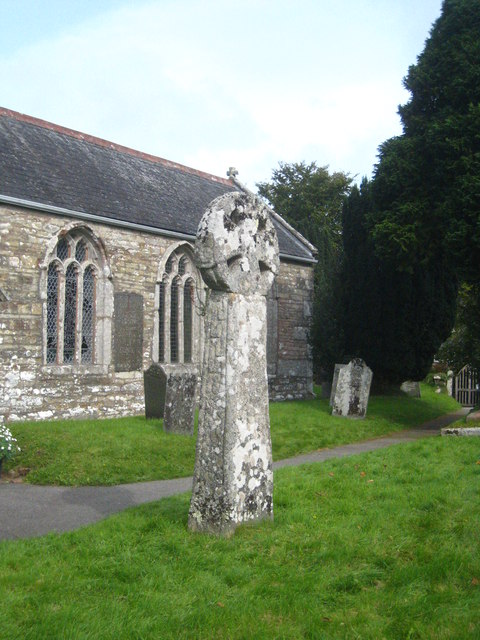
St Meubred's Churchyard

The churchyard contains several historic stone monuments, including two medieval stone crosses. One cross, dating from the 8th–9th centuries, stands near the south porch. It is decorated with relief-carved knotwork, interlaced key patterns, and ring chain, features characteristic of Cornish churchyard crosses. During the 15th century, the cross was built into the exterior east wall of the chancel, and it remained there until it was removed and placed in the burial ground in 1872.

A second cross is located near the entrance to the churchyard. Its head was also recovered from the church wall in 1872. The shaft on which it now stands is considerably older and was originally a memorial stone. An inscription, not discovered until 1901, is carved in Roman capitals and Hiberno-Saxon minuscule and reads, in two lines: Rancoro Fili Mesgi.
