= Church of St James, Antony =

Coordinates: 50.3693°N 4.2536°W

Church of St James
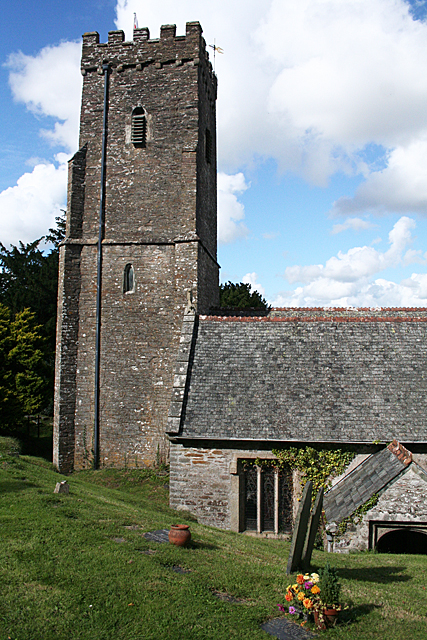
- Church Tower
- Church of St James
- Location: Antony, Cornwall
- Country: England
- Denomination: Church of England

History
- Dedication: St James
- Dedicated: 1259

Administration
- Parish: Antony
- Location within Cornwall

Listed Building – Grade I
- Official name: Church of St James
- Designated: 12 January 1968
- Reference no.: 1140708

The Church of St James is a Grade I listed 12th-century Anglican parish church in Antony, Cornwall, England.

== History ==
The church is located in Antony at grid reference SX 399 547. Dedicated to St James, the church includes structural elements from the 13th, 14th and 15th centuries. Part of the nave and chancel survives from the 13th century and includes a sedilia and round-arched chamfered piscina. The tower was built in the 14th century and the aisles in the 15th.

The church was added to the National Heritage List for England in 1968.

The parish is part of the benefice of Saint Germans with Antony and Sheviock within the Diocese of Truro.

== Architecture ==
The sandstone building has granite dressings and slate roofs. The two-stage tower is supported by diagonal buttresses and has a parapet. It has bell openings and a wooden clock dating from 1810. There is a five-bay south aisle and six-bayaisle to the north. A square sundial, about 1.5 metres (4 ft 11 in) by 1.5 metres (4 ft 11 in) lies on the floor.

Inside the church are memorials to members of the Carew family of Antony (18th century) and a large monumental brass to Margery Arundell, 1420. The pulpit dates from around 1500 and includes panels which look like Spanish work, and one of the fonts is from the 15th century. A wooden chest from the 16th century acts as the altar. The stained glass in the windows includes works by Clayton and Bell and Charles Eamer Kempe.

The church includes monuments to the Carew family, including Richard Carew.
