= Church of St Cubert =

Church in Cubert, Cornwall

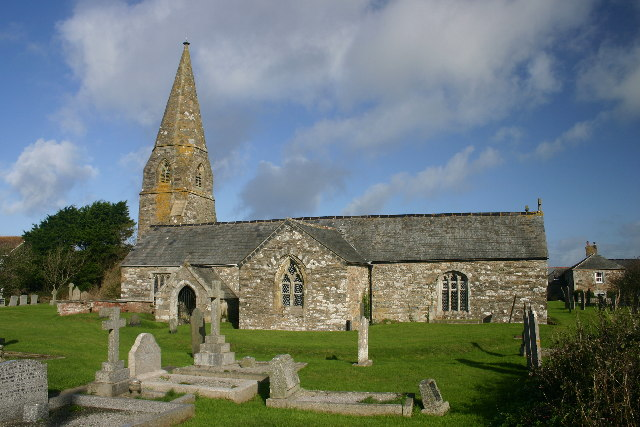
- Church of St Cubert
- 50.3781°N 5.1152°W
- Location: Cubert, Cornwall
- Country: England
- Denomination: Church of England

Administration
- Diocese: Truro
- Deanery: Pydar

The Church of St Cubert is a Grade I listed parish church in Cubert, Cornwall, England. It stands on a site traditionally associated with St Cubert, a 7th-century Welsh missionary. The present building dates mainly from the 13th century, with a west tower and broached spire of around 1300. It was significantly enlarged in the 15th century. The church was restored in the mid-19th century by G. E. Street.

== History ==
The parish is named for St Cubert, a 7th-century Welsh missionary traditionally said to have preached in the area with St Carantoc. According to later tradition, Cubert founded a church at the highest point of the parish before returning to Wales, where he became abbot of a monastery and died in 775. A holy well associated with the saint gave its name to the nearby village of Holywell.

The present 13th-century church stands on the site of an earlier Norman building, which itself replaced a pre-Conquest timber church. Around 1300, a west tower was added, and in the mid-15th century the church was enlarged by the addition of a south aisle, south transept, and porch. The chancel was extended at an early date; an irregular masonry joint on the north side marks this alteration. A carved stone, variously dated to the 6th or 8th century and bearing a Latin inscription, is embedded in the external west wall of the tower.

The church was restored by G. E. Street between 1846 and 1849, and the tower was rebuilt in 1852. It was designated a Grade I listed building in 1967.

== Architecture ==
=== Structure and fabric ===
The church is built of slatestone rubble with granite dressings. The plan comprises a nave and south aisle of similar length, with north and south transepts. The three-stage west tower, also of slatestone, stands on a chamfered plinth with buttresses and string courses. The present spire, rebuilt in the mid-19th century, has a distinctive “drop-shoulder” profile, a form of broached spire more commonly associated with southeastern England. The roofs are slate, and the south transept features handmade crested ridge tiles.

The nave is externally visible only on its north side, where there is a moulded two-centred doorway. An irregular joint in the north wall shows where the chancel was later extended; its east window dates from the 19th century in Perpendicular style. The north transept has raised coped verges with a cross finial and a north window, probably 14th century, with trefoil-headed lights.

The south aisle has five bays, including the porch and transept. Most of its windows date from the 19th century, but a 15th-century three-light east window survives. The gabled south porch has a moulded outer doorway and an inner granite doorway with a 17th-century plank door with studs and fleur-de-lys strap hinges.

=== Interior ===
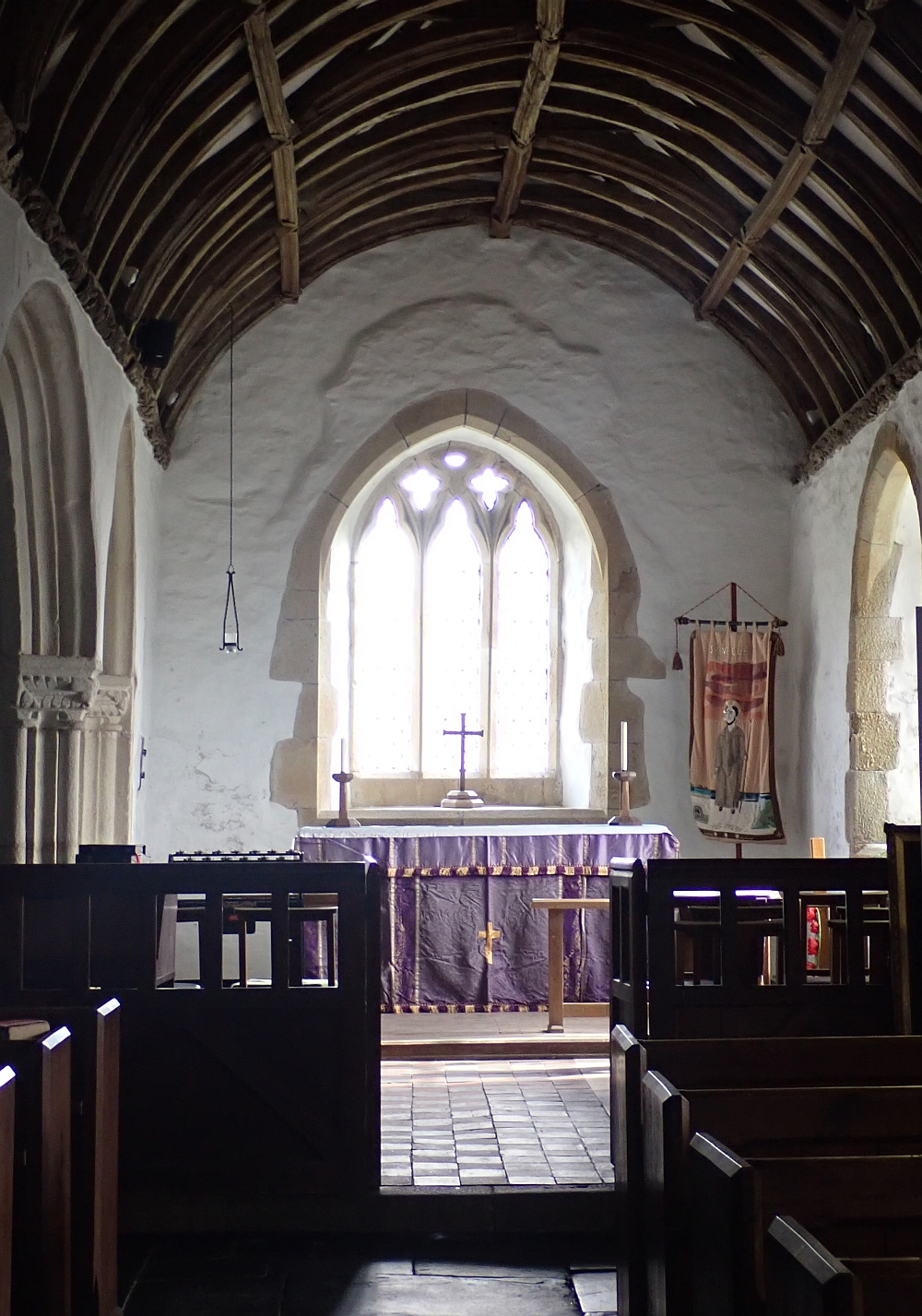
South aisle, St Cubert's church

The interior has plastered walls and a slate-paved floor. The nave has a ceiled wagon roof, with part of a 15th-century carved wall-plate visible on the south wall. The chancel retains a 15th-century wagon roof with carved ribs and wall-plates supported on granite corbels. The south aisle also has a 15th-century wagon roof with moulded ribs and carved wall-plates, while the north transept retains a 15th-century wagon roof with exposed timbers.

The tall tower arch is two-centred with moulded details. The six-bay 15th-century south arcade has carved capitals and three-centred arches. The chancel contains a south aumbry. The south transept includes a four-centred arch and a tomb recess beneath the south window.

The church contains an organ built by Henry “Father” Willis in the late 19th century. The instrument was originally commissioned by Viscount Clifton for the music room at Lanhydrock and was later installed in the church within the Lanhydrock estate grounds. In 1970 it was acquired by St Cubert's Church and installed in its present position.

=== Furnishings and monuments ===
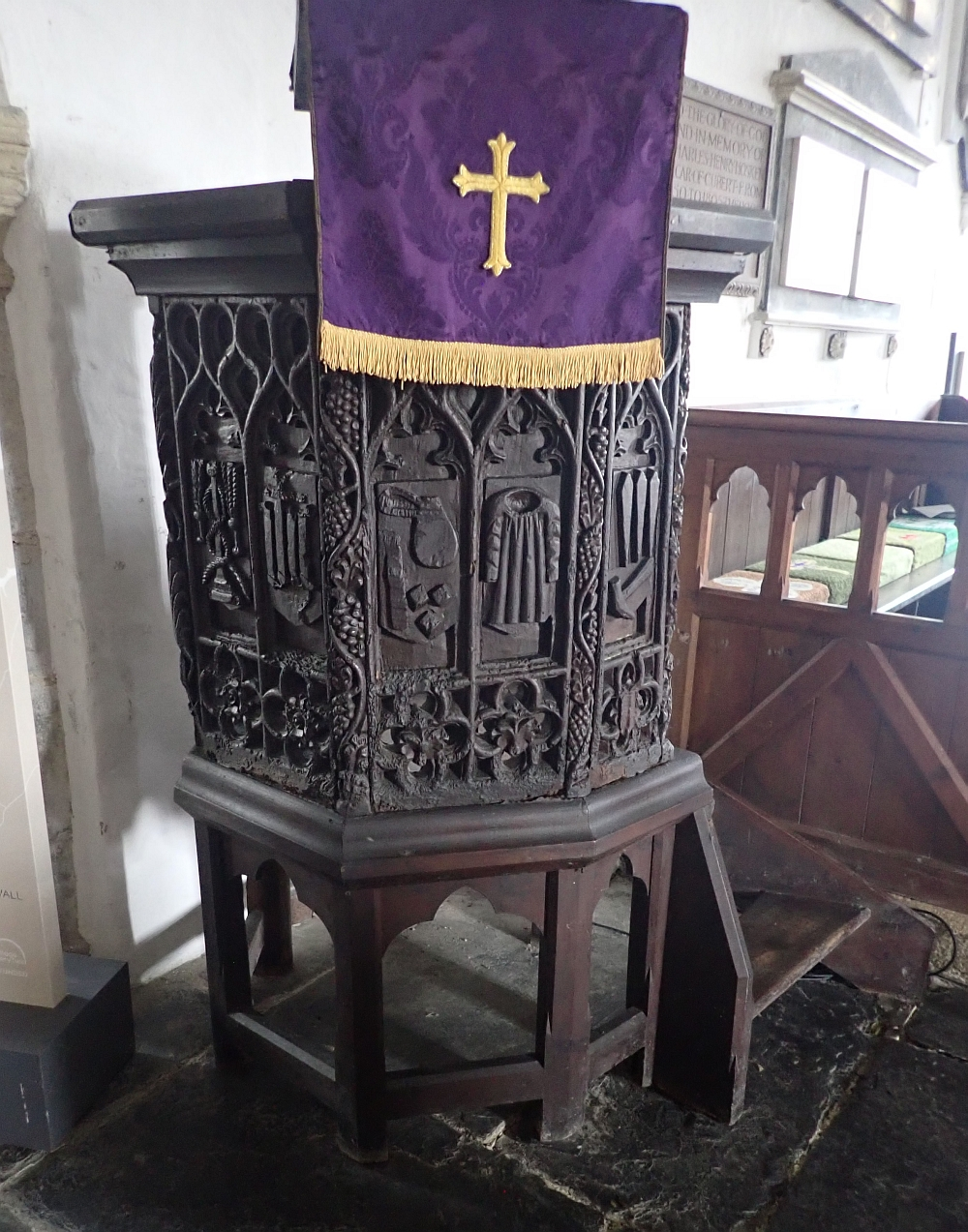
Pulpit, St Cubert

The 13th-century stone font, carved with Norman dogtooth patterns, is supported on a central stem and four shafts. The wooden pulpit incorporates 15th-century bench-end panels carved with the Instruments of the Passion, including a shroud. The nave and aisle have plain 19th-century pews and a low 19th-century screen across the east end.

The south wall of the nave displays the Royal Arms of George IV, dated 1820. Two 19th-century painted boards in the nave show the Ten Commandments. Memorials include tablets and ledger stones in slate and granite, among them monuments to Arthur Lawrence (1669), Joseph Hosken (1780 and 1833), the Revd. Michael Prust (1808), and James Hosken (1839).
