= St Sampson's Church, Golant =

Church in Cornwall, England

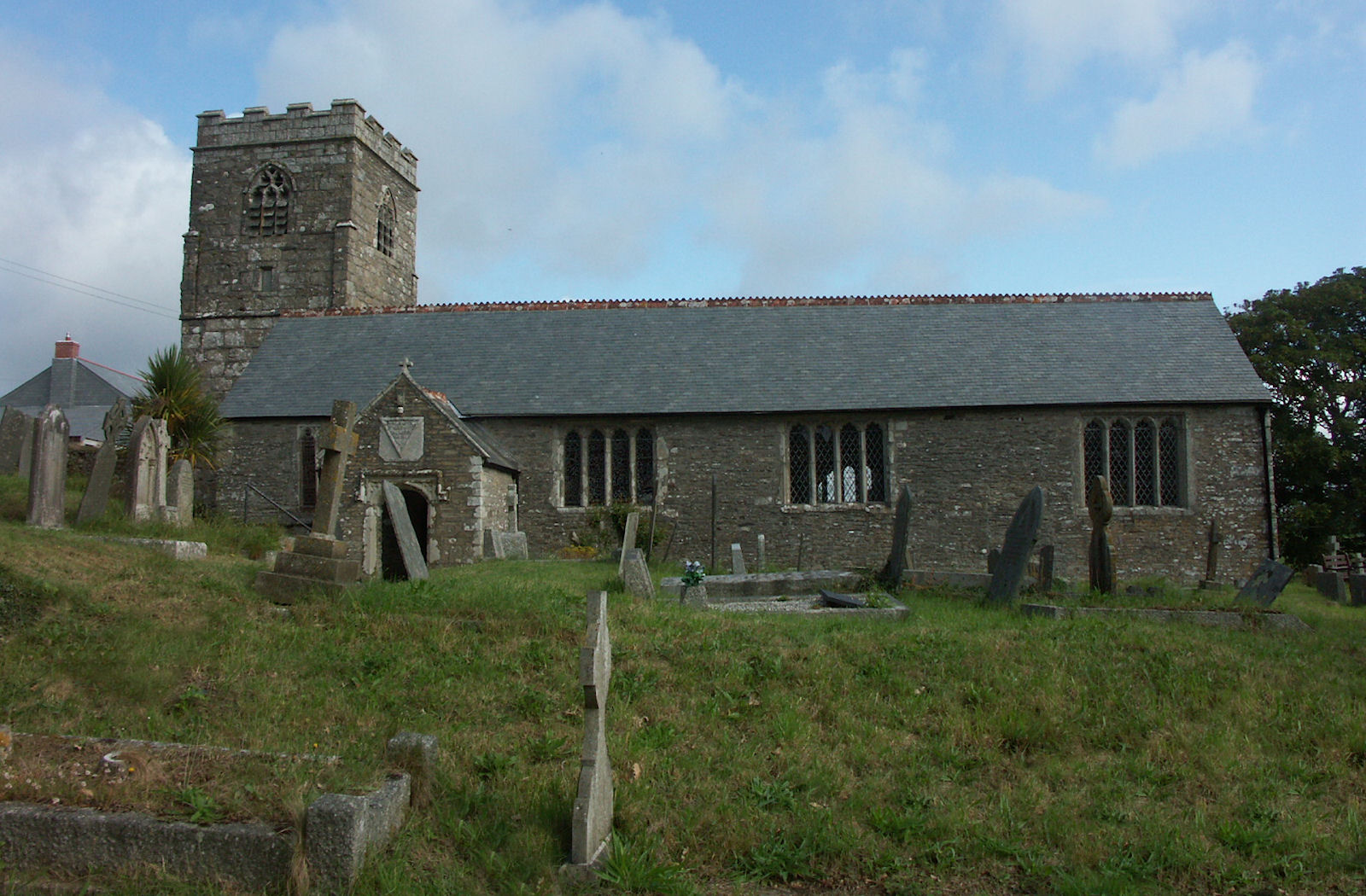
- St Sampson's Church, Golant
- 50°21′59″N 04°38′39″W
- OS grid reference: SX121552
- Denomination: Church of England
- Churchmanship: Broad Church
- Website: www.golant.net

History
- Dedication: Samson of Dol

Administration
- Province: Canterbury
- Diocese: Truro
- Archdeaconry: Cornwall
- Deanery: St Austell
- Parish: Golant

Clergy
- Vicar: Philip de Grey-Warter (priest in charge)
- Location within Cornwall

Listed Building – Grade I
- Official name: Church of St Sampson
- Designated: 10 February 1967
- Reference no.: 1158982

St Sampson's Church is the Church of England parish church of the village of Golant, Cornwall, England, United Kingdom; it is dedicated to St Sampson of Dol.

St Sampson's features in Simon Jenkins's book England's Thousand Best Churches, in which it is described as "warm and welcoming". The poet John Betjeman remarked that its pews were "extremely uncomfortable, recall the fidgets of Gus and Flora in Ravenshoe". It is open every day of the year, holds services every Sunday and evening prayer every Thursday evening at 6 o’clock. Its choir sings every 2nd and 4th Sunday of the month.

== History ==
=== Saint Samson of Dol ===
Although Cornwall has more saints than any other county in the UK, Saint Sampson is one of the better known ones. He sometimes stayed in Golant while travelling to Brittany and became the archbishop of Dol. Many Cornish saints travelling from Ireland to France via the south Cornish coast stopped on the way (sometimes in or near the village). There is now a footpath, the Saints' Way, popular with walkers which runs from Padstow on the north coast to Fowey passing through the village and past the church.

=== Later history ===
Until 1281 this church was a chapelry of Tywardreath and the people of Golant were required to contribute to the upkeep of Tywardreath church. In the period c. 1460 to 1508 the chapel at Golant was rebuilt and in 1508 they refused to make these contributions. The church and its churchyard were consecrated by a suffragan bishop (acting for Hugh Oldham, the Bishop of Exeter). Before that date burials had to be made at Tywardreath. The nave roof has inscriptions recording that its rebuilding was the work of various craft guilds while the south aisle roof was given by the Colquite family. There is a holy well near the porch enclosed in a 15th-century wellhouse.

== Features of interest ==
St Sampson is portrayed in some of the stained glass windows in the church. The church has a ring of five bells. The organ was installed in 1995 and is a hybrid using some of the pipes from an organ originally in St Michael's Church, Newquay, and also some from the organ in Paul Parish Church. A specification of the organ can be found on the National Pipe Organ Register

== List of the Vicars of Golant ==
The Vicars of Golant:

- 1528 Richard Baker
- 1554 William Boyne
- 1556 Thomas Boyne
- 1559 Roger Prior
- 1571 Nicholas Maine
- 1577 Benedict Tyack
- 1580 James Penhalurick
- 1615 Daniel Wetherell
- ???? Thomas Hore
- 1640 George Brush
- 1677 Thomas Sampson
- 1735 Robert Blatchford
- 1769 Peter Coryton
- 1770 R. Eastcott
- 1780 Wymond Cory
- 1820 Thomas Pearce
- 1841 Charles Lyne
- 1865 George Ross
- 1888 H. A. Hill
- 1892 A. H. Langridge
- 1894 B. F. Trusted
- 1900 W. H. Sharpe
- 1902 H. Lines
- 1919 E. A. L. Clarke
- 1925 H. Edwards
- 1934 L. W. Stenson Stenson
- 1950 H. P. Osborne
- 1951 W. G. Hayward
- 1958 R. J. M. May
- 1963 G. E. J. Whitmore
- 1965 William J. Hall
- 1974 M. J. Oatey
- [--?--] (priest in charge) Philip de Grey-Warter

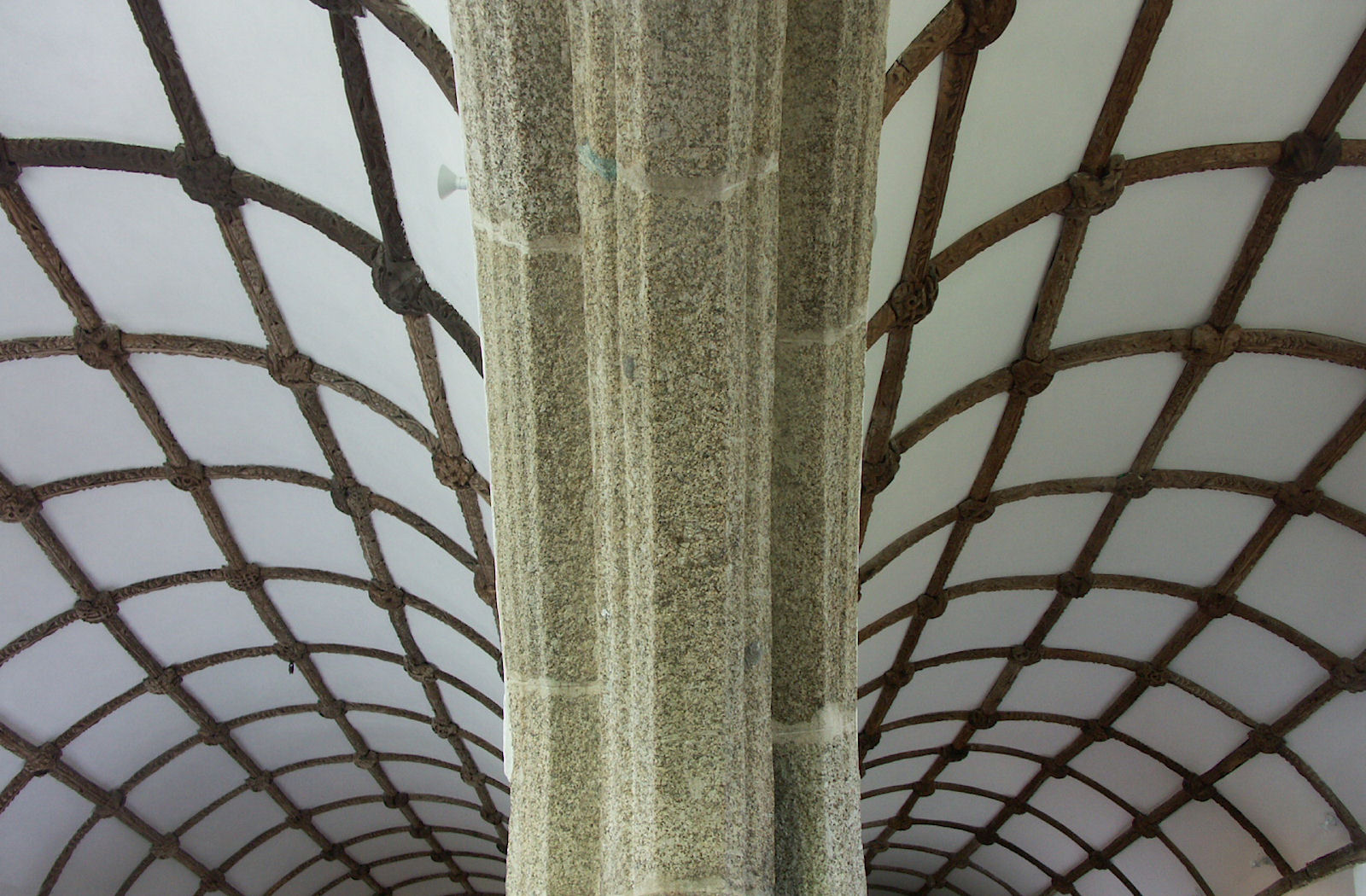
Ceiling
