= St Sampson's Church, South Hill =

Church in South Hill, Cornwall

St Sampson's Church
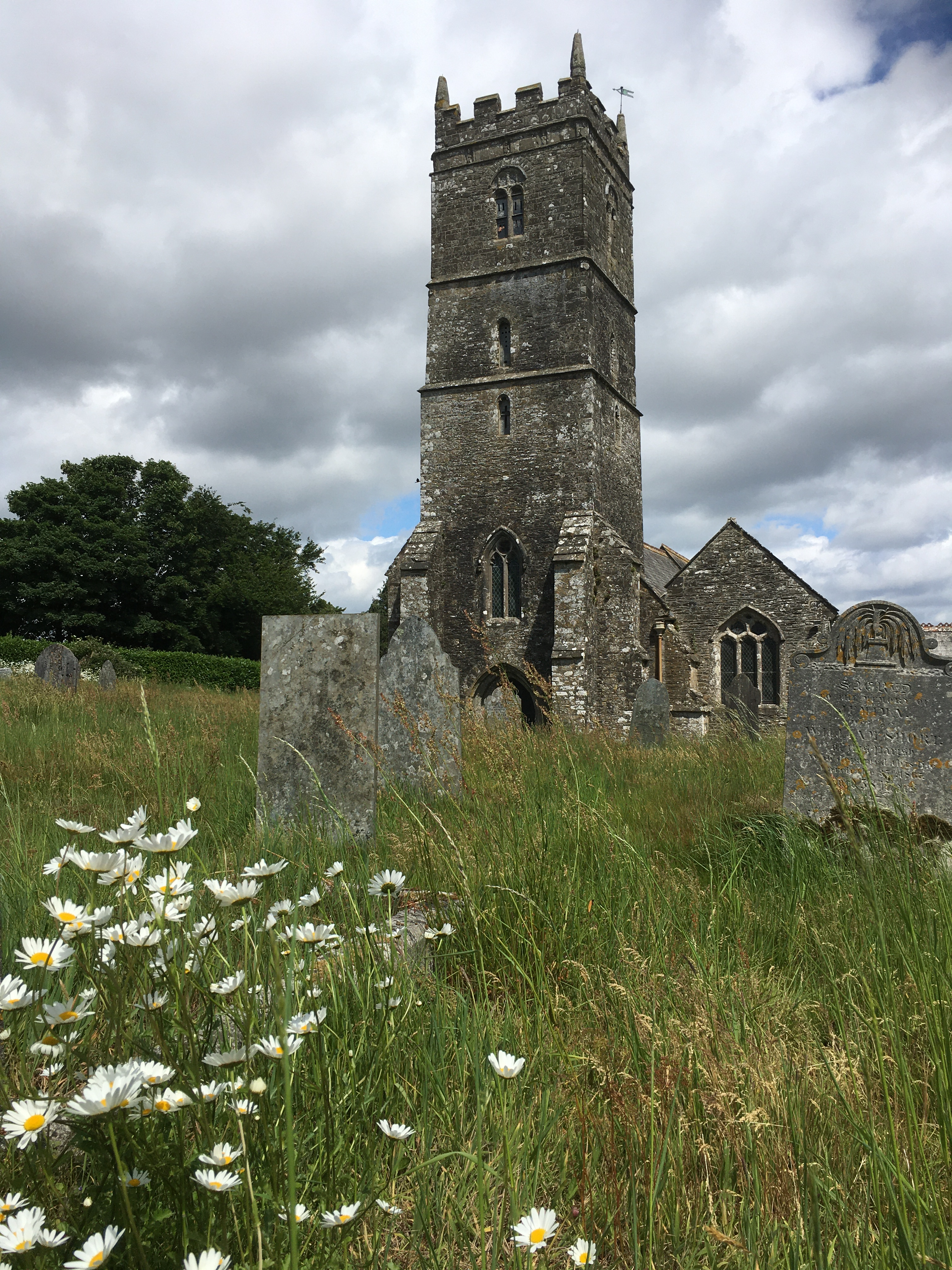
- St Sampson's Church
- 50.52977°N 4.35820°W
- Location: South Hill
- Country: England
- Denomination: Church of England

Administration
- Diocese: Truro
- Archdeaconry: Bodmin
- Deanery: East Wivelshire

St Sampson's Church, South Hill, is a Grade I listed parish church in South Hill, Cornwall, England. The present building, erected on the site of an earlier chapel, was dedicated in 1333 and enlarged in the 15th century, with restoration in the 19th century. The church includes a 12th-century font and an early Christian inscribed standing stone in the churchyard.

== History ==
St Sampson's Church was dedicated in 1333, and the earliest surviving structure includes the nave, chancel, north transept, and lower stages of the west tower. In the 15th century, the church was enlarged by the addition of a four-bay south aisle, the upper stage of the tower, and a south porch. The church was restored in 1871.

The church was designated as a Grade I listed building in 1964.

== Architecture ==
=== Structure and fabric ===
The church is built of stone rubble. The current layout comprises a nave, chancel, north transept, south aisle, west tower, and porch. Buttresses support the nave and chancel, with corner buttresses to the tower and north transept. The south porch is built of large blocks of granite ashlar, and the upper stage of the tower is also faced in granite ashlar. The roofs are slate. The west tower consists of three stages, with angle buttresses to the lower stage and a carved stone frieze of the Apostles below the parapet. The west doorway has a moulded two-centred arch.

Internally, the nave and north transept have medieval king-post roofs, while the chancel and south aisle have original wagon roofs with painted decoration. The south arcade is of 15th-century date. A 17th-century plank door with strap hinges also survives. The windows show a mixture of restored Gothic and 15th-century Perpendicular work. The tower has Perpendicular belfry openings and a restored west window. The north-side windows include 19th-century restorations and blocked medieval openings, while the south aisle has uniform Perpendicular windows.

=== Fittings and monuments ===
The church has several medieval and later fittings. The font is Norman, with a round bowl carved with a Chi-Rho symbol, animals, and foliage, supported on a shaft with four attached columns. Other medieval features include a squint between the north transept and the chancel, a 14th-century piscina in the chancel, and a second, more worn piscina in the north transept. Two Gothic tomb recesses of the 1330s survive on the north side of the chancel.

Monuments include those to the Manaton family in the north transept, a memorial to John Manaton (1507), and an elaborate 17th-century wall monument to Michael Hill (1663). Other features include a carved 17th-century table at the west end of the church, stencilled decoration around the east window, and two 18th-century headstones set into the east wall of the porch. The organ and furnishings date to the Victorian era.

The church has a ring of five bells. Four were cast in 1698 by John Pennington and John Stadler, and a tenor bell was added in 1831 by William and Charles Pannell. The bells were removed for safety reasons in 2023, restored at Taylor's Bell Foundry with support from heritage funding and local fundraising, and reinstalled in 2026.

== Churchyard ==
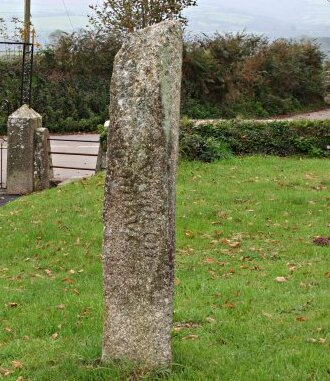
Inscribed stone, 6th century

The churchyard contains a 6th-century Christian inscribed standing stone, which survives largely intact. It is one of four such stones in south-west England bearing the Chi-Rho monogram and has been discussed in studies of early Christianity and political developments in western Britain during the early post-Roman period. The inscription provides rare historical evidence from this time.

In 1923, the stone was designated a scheduled monument.

In 2000, the burial ground was excavated, uncovering evidence of an earlier Norman church and a cist cemetery on the site.
