= Camelford (electoral division) =

Former electoral division of Cornwall in the UK

- Former ward Cornwall Council
- Boundary of Camelford in Cornwall from 2013 to 2021.
- County: Cornwall

2013–2021
- Number of councillors: One
- Replaced by: Camelford and Boscastle
- Created from: Camelford

2009–2013
- Number of councillors: One
- Replaced by: Camelford
- Created from: Council created

Camelford (Cornish: Reskammel) was an electoral division of Cornwall in the United Kingdom which returned one member to sit on Cornwall Council between 2009 and 2021. It was abolished at the 2021 local elections, being succeeded by Camelford and Boscastle.

== Councillors ==
Election	Member	Party
2009	Keith Goodenough	Conservative
2013	Rob Rotchell	Liberal Democrats
2017	Rob Rotchell	Liberal Democrats
2021	Seat abolished	

== Extent ==
Camelford represented the town of Camelford, the villages of Davidstow, St Clether and Tremaine, and the hamlets of Trewalder, Lanteglos, Castlegoff, Tramagenna, Helstone, Trewen, Valley Truckle, Trevia, Tregoodwell, Trewassa, Hallworthy, Tremail, Treglasta, Cold Northcott, Treneglos, Splatt, Three Hammers and Tresmeer. The hamlet of Newhall Green was shared with the St Teath and St Breward division and the settlement of Slaughterbridge was shared with the Tintagel division. The division was affected by boundary changes at the 2013 election. From 2009 to 2013, the division covered 7,079 hectares in total; after the boundary changes in 2013, it covered 7,508 hectares.

== Election results ==
=== 2017 election ===
2017 election: Camelford
Party	Candidate	Votes	%	±%
Liberal Democrats	Rob Rotchell	617	60.0	
Green	Claire Hewlett	372	36.2	
Majority		245	23.8	
Rejected ballots		39	3.8	
Turnout		1028	32.7	
Liberal Democrats hold		Swing		

=== 2013 election ===
2013 election: Camelford
Party	Candidate	Votes	%	±%
Liberal Democrats	Rob Rotchell	459	49.2	
Conservative	Keith Goodenough	452	48.4	
Majority		7	0.8	
Rejected ballots		22	2.4	
Turnout		933	29.5	
Liberal Democrats gain from Conservative		Swing		

=== 2009 election ===
2009 election: Camelford
Party	Candidate	Votes	%	±%
Conservative	Keith Goodenough	525	41.7	
Liberal Democrats	Janey Comber	454	36.1	
Independent	Julie Walters	212	16.8	
Independent	Graham Ford	56	4.4	
Majority		71	5.6	
Rejected ballots		12	1.0	
Turnout		1259	42.2	
Conservative win (new seat)				
