= Camelford and Boscastle (electoral division) =

Electoral division of Cornwall in the UK

- ward Cornwall Council
- Boundary of Camelford and Boscastle in Cornwall from 2021.
- County: Cornwall

Current ward
- Created: 2021
- Councillor: Barry Jordan (Conservative)
- Number of councillors: One
- Created from: Camelford; Tintagel

Camelford and Boscastle is an electoral division of Cornwall in the United Kingdom which returns one member to sit on Cornwall Council. It was created at the 2021 local elections, being created from the former divisions of Camelford and Tintagel. The current councillor is Barry Jordan, a member of the Conservative Party.

== Boundaries ==
Camelford and Boscastle represents the parishes of Advent, Camelford, Davidstow, Forrabury and Minster, Lesnewth, Otterham, St. Clether, St. Juliot, Tremaine, Treneglos, Tresmeer, Trevalga, and Warbstow. It is bordered to the north by the North Coast and the electoral division of Poundstock, to the east by the division of Launceston North and North Petherwin, to the south by the division of Altarnun and Stoke Climsland, and to the south and west by the division of St Teath and Tintagel.

== Councillors ==
Election	Member	Party
2021	Barry Jordan	Conservative

== Election results ==
=== 2021 election ===
Camelford and Boscastle
Party	Candidate	Votes	%	±%
Conservative	Barry Jordan (Note: Incumbent councillor, formerly representing Tintagel)	1,067	50.1	N/A
Liberal Democrats	Rob Rotchell (Note: Incumbent councillor, formerly representing Camelford)	687	32.2	N/A
Independent	Claire Hewlett	377	17.7	N/A
Majority		380	17.8	N/A
Rejected ballots		16	0.7	N/A
Turnout		2,147		N/A
Conservative win (new seat)				
