= St Teath and St Breward (electoral division) =

Electoral division of Cornwall in the UK

- Former ward Cornwall Council
- Boundary of St Teath and St Breward in from 2013-2021.
- County: Cornwall

2013–2021
- Number of councillors: One
- Replaced by: St Teath and Tintagel
- Created from: St Teath

St Teath and St Breward (Cornish: Eglostedha ha Sen Bruwerd) was an electoral division of Cornwall in the United Kingdom which returned one member to sit on Cornwall Council between 2013 and 2021. It was abolished at the 2021 local elections, being succeeded by St Teath and Tintagel.

== Councillors ==
Election	Member	Party
2013	John Lugg	Independent
2016 by-election	Dominic Fairman	Liberal Democrats
2017	Dominic Fairman	Liberal Democrats
2021	Seat abolished	

== Extent ==
St Teath and St Breward represented the villages of Delabole, St Teath, Treveighan, Michaelstow, and St Breward, and the hamlets of Treligga, Westdowns, Treburgett, Knightsmill, Wenfordbridge, Penpont, Lank, Tresinney, and Watergate. The hamlet of Newhall Green was shared with the Camelford division. The division covered 8,527 hectares in total.

== Election results ==
=== 2017 election ===
2017 election: St Teath and St Breward
Party	Candidate	Votes	%	±%
Liberal Democrats	Dominic Fairman	994	69.7	▲24.9
Conservative	John Phillips	348	24.4	▲9.8
Labour	David Garrigan	81	5.7	▲0.9
Majority		646	45.3	▲18.0
Rejected ballots		4	0.3	▲0.3
Turnout		1427	44.9	▲2.1
Liberal Democrats hold		Swing		

=== 2016 by-election ===
The 2016 by-election was called after the resignation of John Lugg.

2016 by-election: St Teath and St Breward
Party	Candidate	Votes	%	±%
Liberal Democrats	Dominic Fairman	620	44.8	▲13.4
Independent	William Kitto	242	17.5	New
Conservative	Jeremy Stanford-Davis	202	14.6	▼1.9
Independent	Susan Theobald	181	13.1	New
Independent	Edward Jones	73	5.3	New
Labour	David Garrigan	66	4.8	New
Majority		378	27.3	N/A
Rejected ballots		0	0.0	▼1.1
Turnout		1384	42.8	▲4.7
Liberal Democrats gain from Independent		Swing		

=== 2013 election ===
2013 election: St Teath and St Breward
Party	Candidate	Votes	%	±%
Independent	John Lugg	628	50.9	
Liberal Democrats	Eddie Jones	388	31.4	
Conservative	Henry Hine	204	16.5	
Majority		240	19.4	
Rejected ballots		14	1.1	
Turnout		1234	38.1	
Independent win (new seat)				
