= St Adwen's Church, Advent =

St Adwen’s Church, Advent
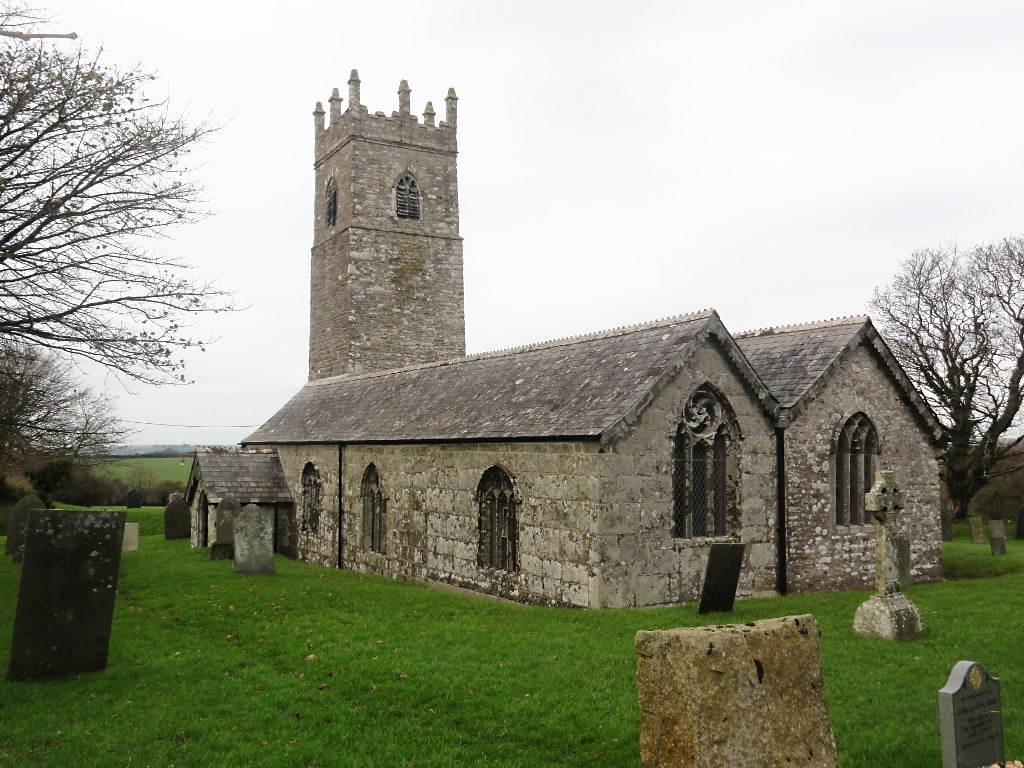
- St Adwen’s Church, Advent

- Location within Cornwall
- 50°36′12.1″N 04°40′48″W
- OS grid reference: SX 10472 81608
- Location: Advent, Cornwall
- Country: England
- Denomination: Church of England

History
- Dedication: St Adwenna

Administration
- Province: Canterbury
- Diocese: Truro
- Archdeaconry: Bodmin
- Deanery: Trigg Minor and Bodmin
- Parish: Lanteglos by Camelford with Advent

Listed Building – Grade I
- Official name: Church of St Adwen
- Designated: 17 December 1962
- Reference no.: 1328128

St Adwen's Church, Advent is a Grade I listed parish church in the Church of England in Advent, Cornwall. It is the only church in Cornwall to have eight pinnacles to its tower. It is dedicated to St Adwen, one of the daughters of King Brychan of Brycheiniog.

== History ==
The north transept and the west tower date from the 13th century. The font is Norman. The south aisle is 15th century.

The church was restored in 1847-48 when the south chapel was demolished. From 1872 to 1874, at a cost of £400 (equivalent to £39,100 in 2025), the north walls of the nave and chancel, and the whole of the north transept was rebuilt. The pews were removed and open seating was provided. The work was executed by Westlake, Hooper and Worden of Camelford. It was re-opened on 23 September 1874.

There was a further restoration in 1975.

The ecclesiastical parish is the responsibility of the Rector of Lanteglos-by-Camelford, and Advent has been associated with Lanteglos since medieval times.

== Parish status ==
The church is in a joint benefice with:

- St Julitta's Church, Lanteglos-by-Camelford
- St Thomas of Canterbury's Church, Camelford

== Monuments ==
The church contains monuments to Elizabeth Bennet (died 1643, dated 1667), John Batten (died 1710), and Edward Dinham of Newton, St Kew (died 1831), as well as a carved granite stone to William Michel (died 1650), his wife Agnis (1685), and their children Elizabeth, Anne, Margery and Grace.

== Bells ==
The tower contains a ring of 6 bells. The oldest dates from around 1792 by Robert II Wells. Another bell is by John Taylor dating from 1832. The remainder are by John Warner & Sons, two from 1878 and two from 1907.
