= Fentonadle =

Hamlet in Cornwall, England

Coordinates: 50.569°N 4.707°W

- Location within Cornwall
- OS grid reference: SX084779
- Civil parish: Michaelstow
- Unitary authority: Cornwall
- Ceremonial county: Cornwall
- Region: South West
- Country: England
- Sovereign state: United Kingdom
- Post town: BODMIN
- Postcode district: PL30
- Dialling code: 01208
- Police: Devon and Cornwall
- Fire: Cornwall
- Ambulance: South Western
- UK Parliament: North Cornwall

Fentonadle is a hamlet situated 4 miles (6.4 km) south-west from Camelford in Cornwall, England. Fentonadle lies at around 120 metres (390 ft) above sea level in the civil parish of Michaelstow situated on the western side of the River Camel valley and to the north-west of Bodmin Moor. It is in the civil parish of St Breward
