= Julitta (Cornwall) =

Celtic saint

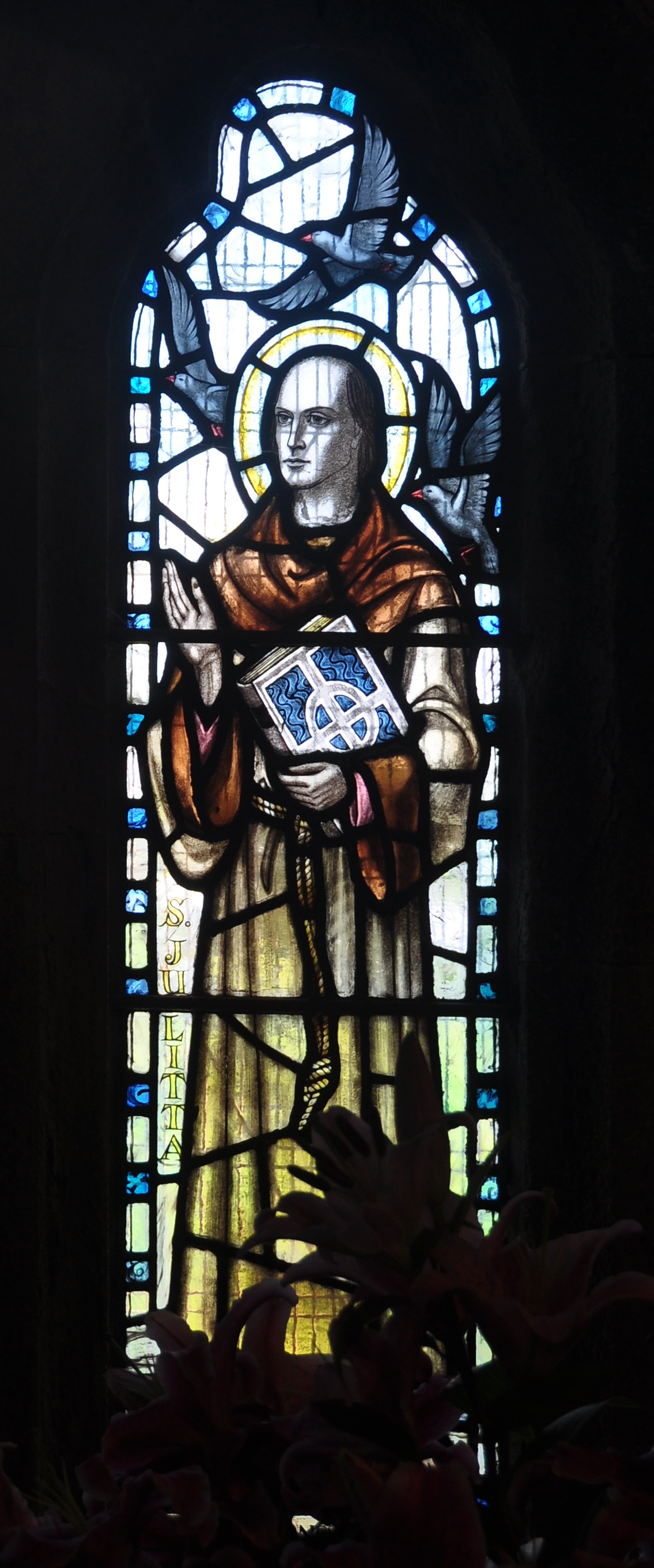
A stained glass window depicting Julitta

Saint Julitta, or Saint Juliot, is a male Celtic saint to whom two Cornish churches are dedicated. He is believed to have settled at the site of Tintagel Castle at the end of the 5th century and established a small monastic community. In some accounts he is a member of the Children of Brychan and St Nectan and the holy female Hermit, St Keyne, are thought to have been his companions. He is the patron of the parish churches of St Juliot and of Lanteglos by Camelford. The Norman chapel of Tintagel Castle is dedicated to St Julitta. At Jetwells near Camelford is a holy well. Jetwells derives from "Juliot's well".

He should not be confused with either of two early female martyrs called Julitta. One was Julitta of Caesarea, a widow venerated by Saint Basil who left a testimony of her life on the 70th anniversary of her death. The other Julitta, known as Julitta of Tarsus, also a widow, is associated with the three year old child, St Cyricus. She was his mother. All three are martyrs in the 3rd or 4th century and considered saints both in the Eastern and the Western Rite Christian churches. Cyricus is known as St. Cyr in France.

== See also ==
- St Julitta's Church, Lanteglos-by-Camelford
