= Adwen =

5th-century Welsh saint

Saint Adwen

Princess of Brycheiniog
- Born: 5th century Brycheiniog
- Died: 5th or 6th century Cornwall
- Canonized: Pre-Congregation
- Major shrine: Advent
- Patronage: Advent

Adwen or Adwenna is purported to have been a 5th-century Christian virgin and saint. According to historian Nicholas Orme, Adwen was identified in the original tradition as a brother of Nectan of Hartland, but subsequently misclassified by Charles Henderson in the 18th century as female.

Adwen is therefore recorded as a daughter of Brychan, king of Brycheiniog in south Wales, in Doble's Life of Saint Nectan and in Robert Hunt's collection of Cornish legends. These sources associate her with the establishment of the parish of Advent in Cornwall.

The saint's feast day is unknown. In Cornwall Adwen was traditionally the patron saint of sweethearts.

== See also ==
- Saint Dwynwen, the related Welsh saint
- St Adwen's Church, Advent
