= North Cornwall Museum and Art Gallery =

Coordinates: 50.62081°N 4.68105°W

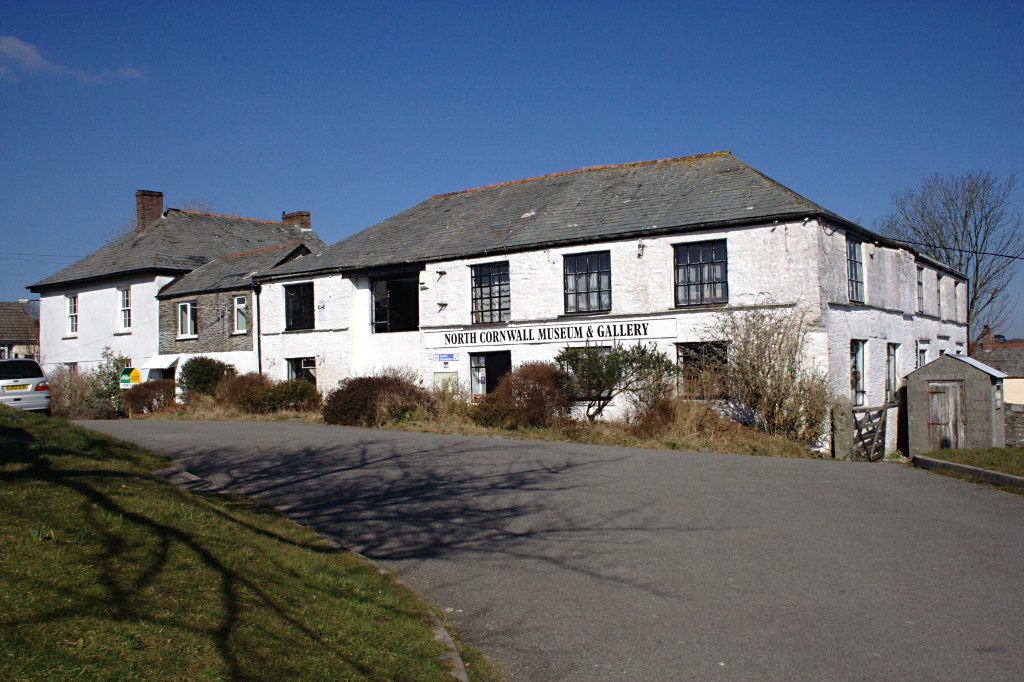
The museum

The North Cornwall Museum and Art Gallery is a privately owned local museum and art gallery in Camelford, north Cornwall, England, UK.

The museum opened in 1973 in a building that was originally used for building coaches and wagons. The museum covers life in North Cornwall between 50 and 100 years ago -including cider-making, dairy, farming, and wagons - with sections on the tools used by different types of traditional crafts and professions. There is also a Cornish and Devonshire earthenware collection. Sally Holden is the owner and manager of the museum which is also the tourist information centre for Camelford. The museum only opens from April to September each year.
