= Camelford Town Hall =

Municipal building in Camelford, Cornwall, England

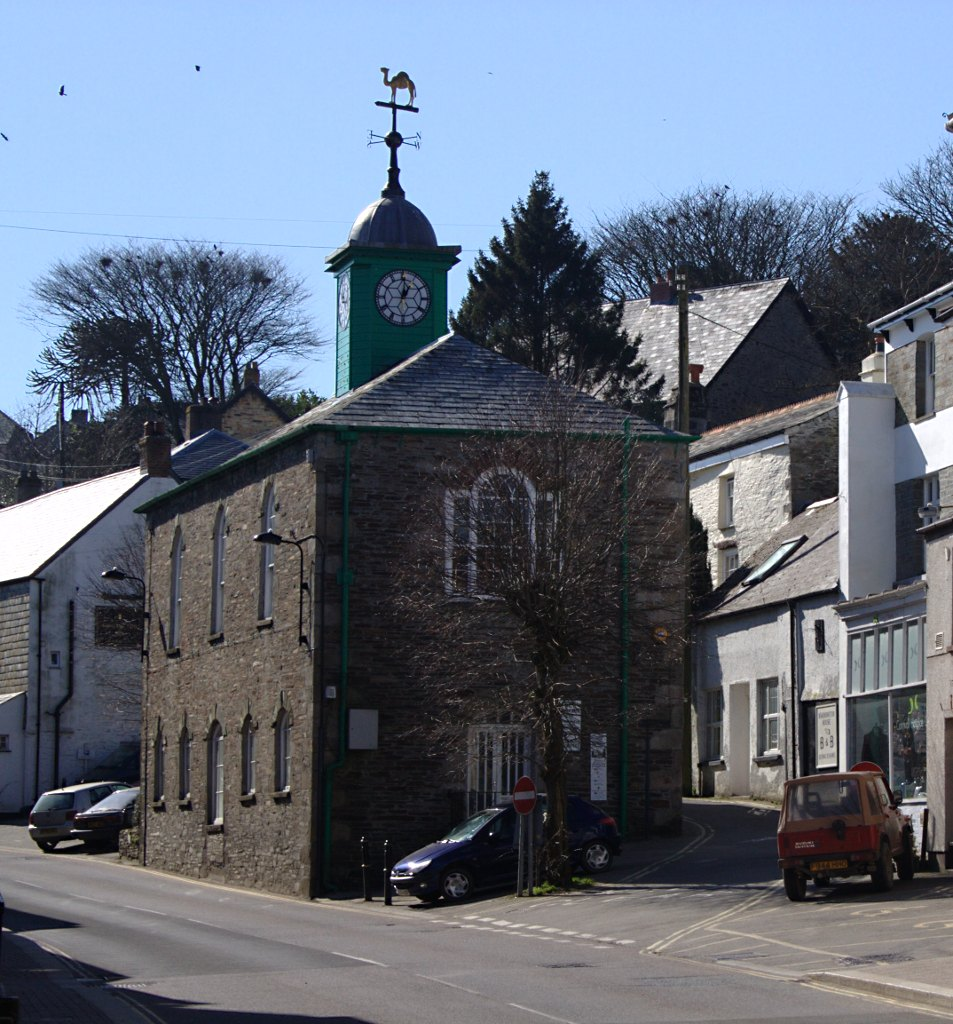
- Camelford Town Hall

- Shown in Cornwall
- 50.6225°N 4.6794°W
- Location: Market Place, Camelford, Cornwall, England

History
- Built: 1806

Site notes
- Architectural style: Neoclassical style

Listed Building – Grade II
- Official name: Library
- Designated: 19 January 1952
- Reference no.: 1138348

Camelford Town Hall is a municipal building in the Market Place, Camelford, Cornwall, England. The town hall, which is currently used as a public library, is a Grade II listed building.

== History ==
The building was originally erected as a single-storey market house dating back at least to the late-17th century. In the early 19th century, the lord of the manor and local patron, John Russell, 6th Duke of Bedford, decided to remodel the building to create an assembly room on the first floor: the enlarged structure was designed in the neoclassical style, built in rubble masonry and completed in 1806.

The design involved a symmetrical main frontage facing south onto the Market Place; the central bay originally featured a round headed doorway which was flanked by two round headed windows on either side on the ground floor and there were three round headed windows on the first floor. The east and west elevations featured wide openings on the ground floor and Venetian windows on the first floor. The new assembly room on the first floor was accessed by an external staircase on the north side.

At roof level a timber cupola was installed with a clock and a weather vane. The cupola contained two bells, the oldest of which (the market bell) had been a gift to the town from the mayor, William Prideaux, in 1699. The other, larger bell (dated 1807) was installed at the same time as the clock and used to strike the hours; the clockmaker was John Thwaites of Clerkenwell. The weather vane on top of the cupola took the form of a camel despite the fact that the name of the town was actually derived from the Brythonic name of the river, "Allen", in combination with "cam" which means crooked and the English word "ford".

Camelford had a very small electorate and a dominant patron, William Vane, 1st Duke of Cleveland, which meant it was recognised by the UK Parliament as a rotten borough. Its right to elect members of parliament was removed by the Reform Act 1832, and its borough council, which had met in the town hall, was abolished under the Municipal Corporations Act 1883. In the late 19th century and early 20th century the building continued to serve as the venue for petty sessions and county court hearings. The building was subsequently transferred to a specially formed entity, the Camelford Town Trust, and stained glass displaying the former borough coat of arms was made at the expense of the clerk to the trust, Thomas Edwin Wakefield, and installed in the west-facing Venetian window in 1933.

In 1975, the trust decided to convert part of the ground floor and the whole of the first floor into facilities for the county library: the works were carried out to a design by the county Architect, Alan Groves, and the rest of the ground floor was subsequently converted into an office for the charity, Age Concern. Restoration work carried out in the early 21st century included the re-gilding of the weather vane in 2000. The management of the library was transferred from Cornwall Council to Camelford Town Council in March 2018 and, after additional refurbishment works, a community hub opened in the building in April 2018. Princess Alexandra visited the building and saw the completed works during a visit to Cornwall on 31 July 2018.
