= Hallworthy =

Coordinates: 50.661°N 4.576°W

Hallworthy: Cornish: Halworgi
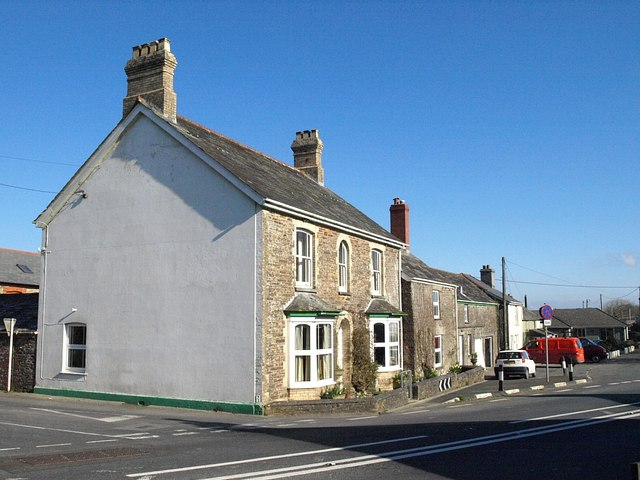
- Cottages at Hallworthy

- Location within Cornwall
- OS grid reference: SX180878
- Civil parish: Treneglos
- Unitary authority: Cornwall
- Ceremonial county: Cornwall
- Region: South West
- Country: England
- Sovereign state: United Kingdom
- Post town: Camelford
- Postcode district: PL32

Hallworthy (Cornish: Halworgi) is a hamlet in the parish of Treneglos, Cornwall, England. It is at a crossroads on the A395 road from Davidstow to Launceston. To the east is a plantation called Wilsey Down Forest. It is in the civil parish of Davidstow
