= St Julitta's Church, Lanteglos-by-Camelford =

St Julitta’s Church, Lanteglos-by-Camelford
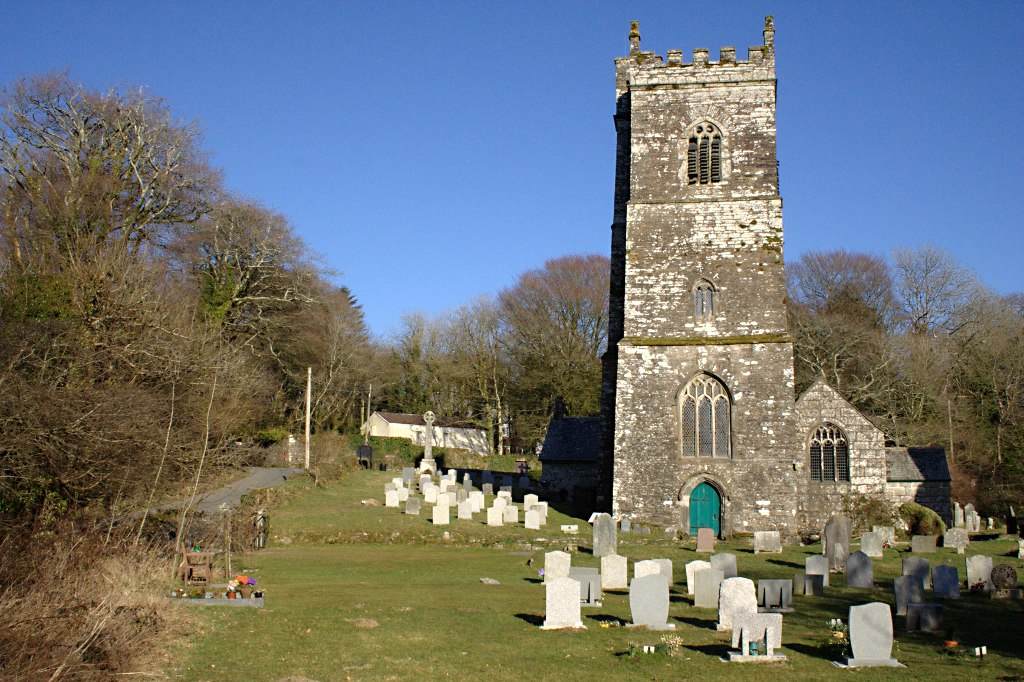
- St Julitta’s Church, Lanteglos-by-Camelford

- Location within Cornwall
- 50°37′26.6″N 04°40′38″W
- OS grid reference: SX 08815 82343
- Location: Lanteglos-by-Camelford, Cornwall
- Country: England
- Denomination: Church of England

History
- Dedication: St Julitta

Administration
- Province: Canterbury
- Diocese: Truro
- Archdeaconry: Bodmin
- Deanery: Trigg Minor and Bodmin
- Parish: Lanteglos by Camelford with Advent

Listed Building – Grade I
- Official name: Church of St Julitta
- Designated: 17 December 1962
- Reference no.: 1142729

St Julitta's Church, Lanteglos-by-Camelford is a Grade I listed parish church in the Church of England Diocese of Truro in Lanteglos-by-Camelford, Cornwall. (St Julitta's Church, St Juliot, is dedicated to the same local saint.)

== History ==
The church dates from the 12th century, with a 14th-century tower. The six bay south aisle and possibly also the south porch were added in the 15th century.

In 1860 the church was re-roofed.

It was restored in a heavy-handed manner by James Piers St Aubyn starting in 1865. Restoration of the nave and south aisle by Messrs Westlake and Cann were completed by August 1867 such that the church could be reopened but further work was still ongoing.

Further restoration was done in 1873.

In 1870, one of the choristers, George Perry, aged 12, an inmate of the workhouse, was detected stealing half a crown (equivalent to £12.86 in 2025) from the offertory whilst “bearing the bag” in the church. He was remanded for a month.

== Parish status ==
The church is in a joint benefice with:

- St Adwen's Church, Advent
- St Thomas of Canterbury's Church, Camelford

== Memorials ==
- W. Inch (d. 1815) by Robert Isbell of Stonehouse

== Organ ==
The organ dated from around 1793 and was built by William Allen of London. A specification of the organ can be found in the National Pipe Organ Register. It was removed in 1986.

== Bells ==
The tower contains a peal of 6 bells. Four date from 1783 and are by John II Pennington and Christopher IV Pennington. The remaining two are from 1883 by John Warner & Sons.

== Churchyard crosses ==
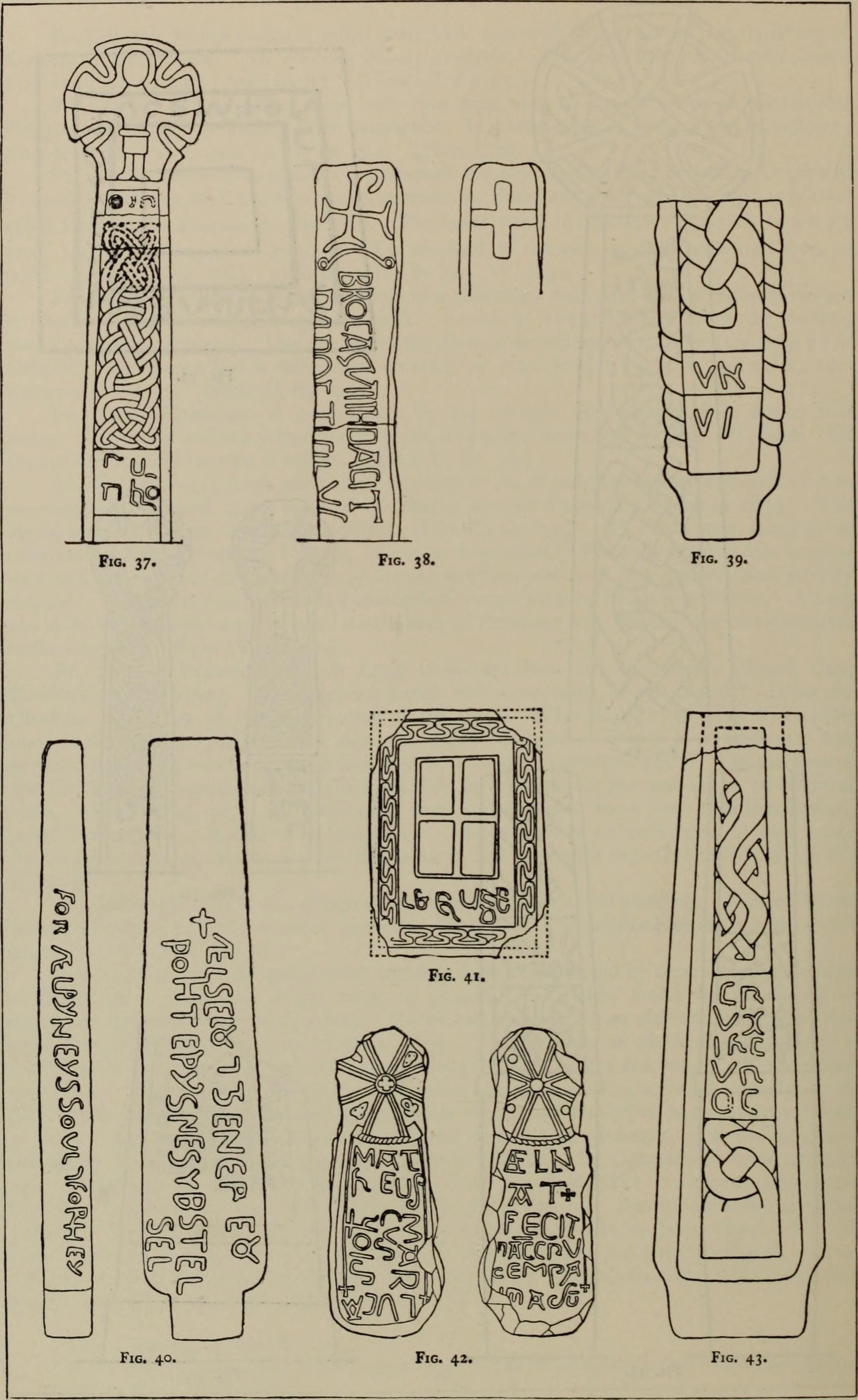
The Lanteglos inscribed stone is Fig. 40 in this plate from the Victoria County History of Cornwall

The church is noted for the four medieval wheel-headed crosses and an inscribed stone from the 10th century which reads AELSELD 7 GENERED WOHTE YSNE SYBSTEL FOR AELWYNEYS SOUL 7 FOR HEYSEL. This has been translated as Aelsel and Genere made this family stone or place of peace for Aelwine's soul and for themselves or Heysel. Discovered at Castle Goff Farm in 1858, it was relocated here in 1900 and is now a scheduled monument. The Anglo-Saxon inscription is hard to read: another version is "Aelselth ⁊ Genereth wohte thisne sybstel for Aelwines soul ⁊ for heysel" (Alseth and Generth wrought this personal memorial for Aelwine and for themselves).
