= Michaelstow =

Village in Cornwall, England

Coordinates: 50.578°N 4.713°W

Michaelstow: Cornish: Logmighal
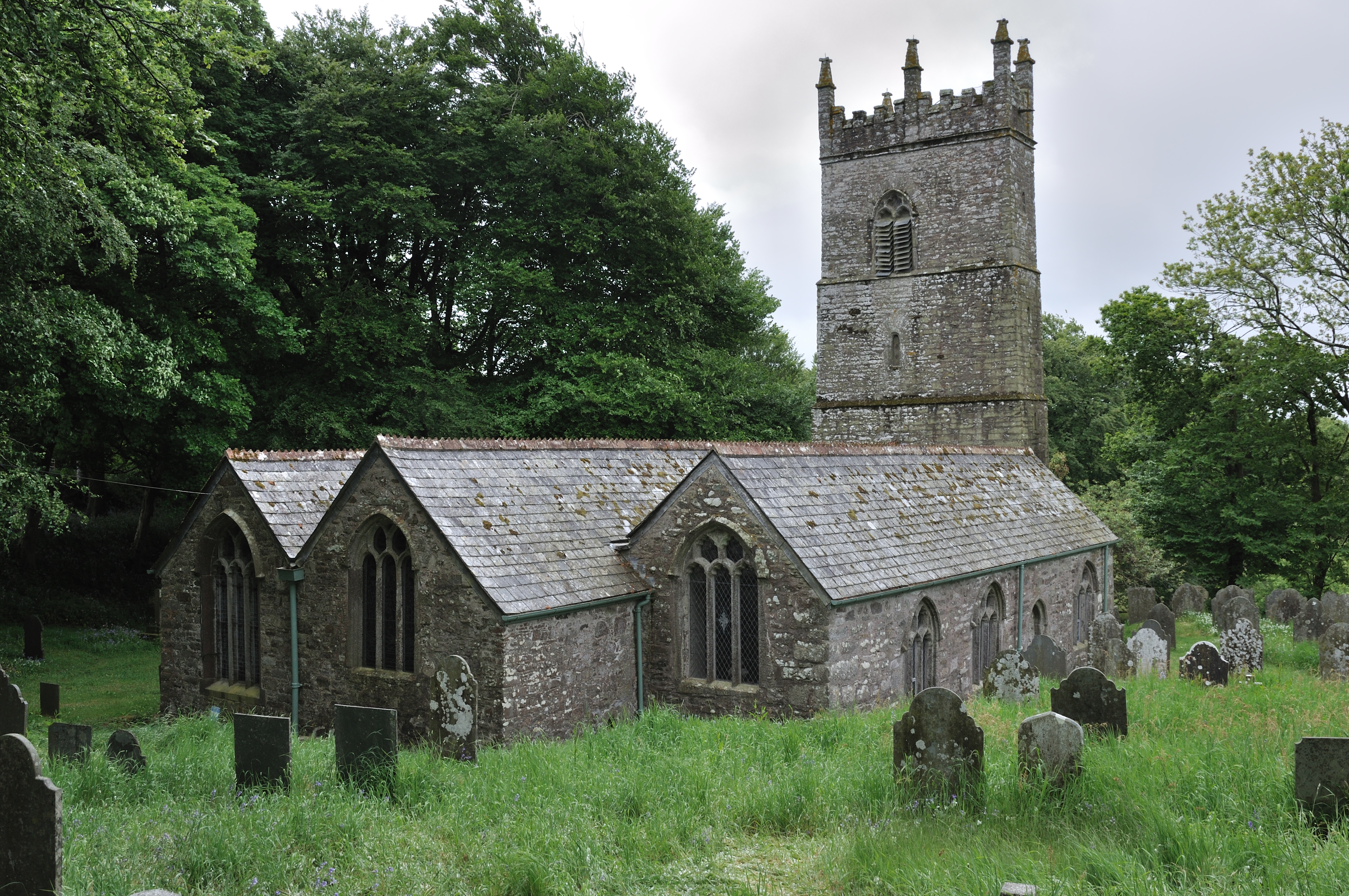
- Michaelstow Church

- Location within Cornwall
- Population: 233 (Civil Parish, 2011)
- OS grid reference: SX079788
- Civil parish: Michaelstow
- Unitary authority: Cornwall
- Ceremonial county: Cornwall
- Region: South West
- Country: England
- Sovereign state: United Kingdom
- Post town: BODMIN
- Postcode district: PL30
- Dialling code: 01208
- Police: Devon and Cornwall
- Fire: Cornwall
- Ambulance: South Western
- UK Parliament: North Cornwall

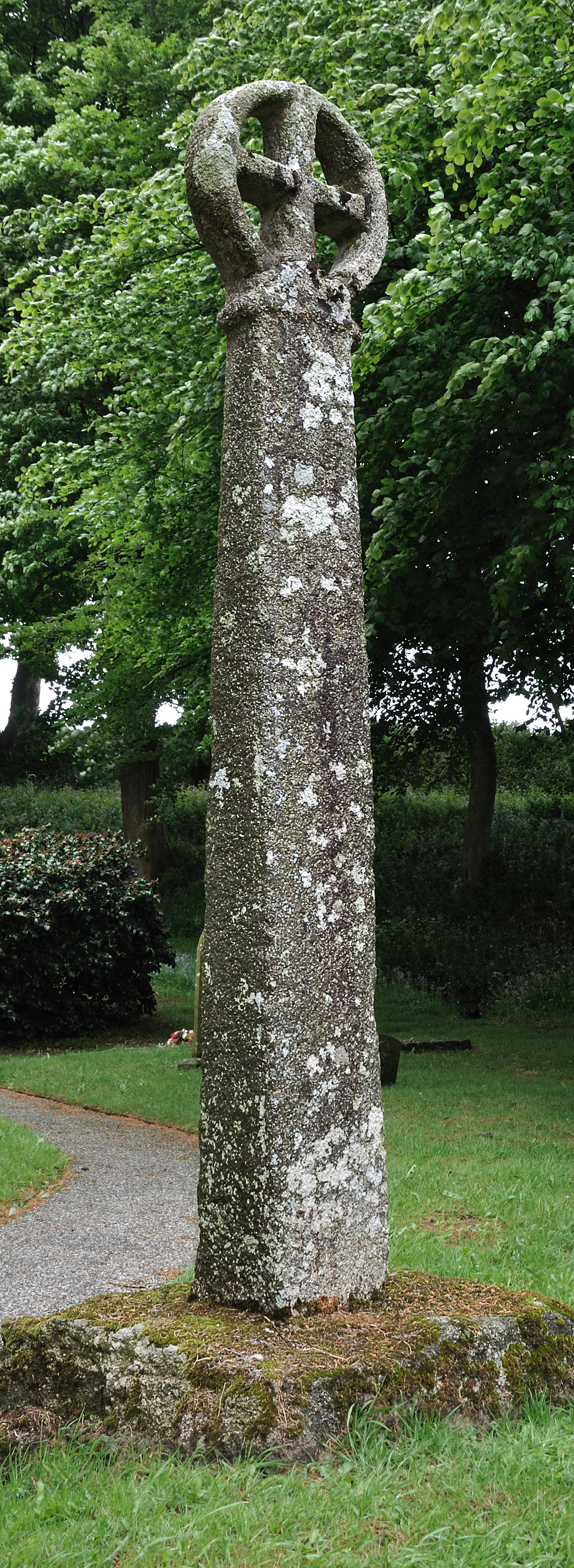
The cross in the churchyard

Michaelstow (Cornish: Logmighal (village) or Pluw Vighal yn Trygordh (parish)) is a civil parish and village in north Cornwall, England, United Kingdom. The village is about three miles (4.8 km) south of Camelford. The hamlets of Fentonadle, Trevenning and Treveighan are in the parish.

The civil parish of Michaelstow is in the deanery of Trigg Minor and Hundred of Lesnewth. It is named after 'St Michael's holy place' and the parish church is dedicated to St Michael and All Angels. There is a tall Cornish cross in the churchyard, original location unknown; it formed part of a series of steps up to the churchyard until it was removed in 1883. Three more crosses are at Trevenning. The River Camel runs along its eastern edge and the surrounding parishes are Lanteglos-by-Camelford to the north, St Breward to the east, St Tudy to the south and St Teath to the west.

Helsbury Castle (Cornish: Kastel Bre Henlys, lit. 'castle on the hill of the old court'), an Iron Age hill fort, stands on Michaelstow Beacon half-a-mile north of the village.
