= Samuel Cook (artist) =

English painter

Samuel Cook (1806–1859) was an English watercolour artist.

== Life ==
He was born in at Camelford in Cornwall. At the age of nine he was apprenticed to a firm of woollen manufacturers in the town, where during the intervals of his duties he would amuse himself with making drawings in chalk on the floor of the factory, to the annoyance of his employers, one of whom declared that "he would never be fit for anything but a limner". On the expiry of his apprenticeship he went to Plymouth, where he set up as a painter and glazier. Every hour he could snatch from business, however, was devoted to sketching from nature. In 1830 he became a member of the New Society of Painters in Water Colours (now the Royal Institute of Painters in Water Colours), to whose annual exhibition he became a regular contributor, chiefly of coastal scenes, until his death 1859.

An obituary in The Art Journal said of him:

Always weak as a colourist, and especially so when his pictures hung in juxtaposition with some of the deeptoned works of his contemporaries...
there was yet in them such quiet, simple truth, and so much real artistic feeling united with skilful manipulation, that it was impossible to study them and not be convinced they were the productions of one possessing refined taste, poetical conception, knowledge of natural effects, and sound judgment in the management of subject matter.

A view of Stonehouse, Plymouth by him is in the Victoria and Albert Museum in London.
