= Castle Goff =

Enclosure in Cornwall, England

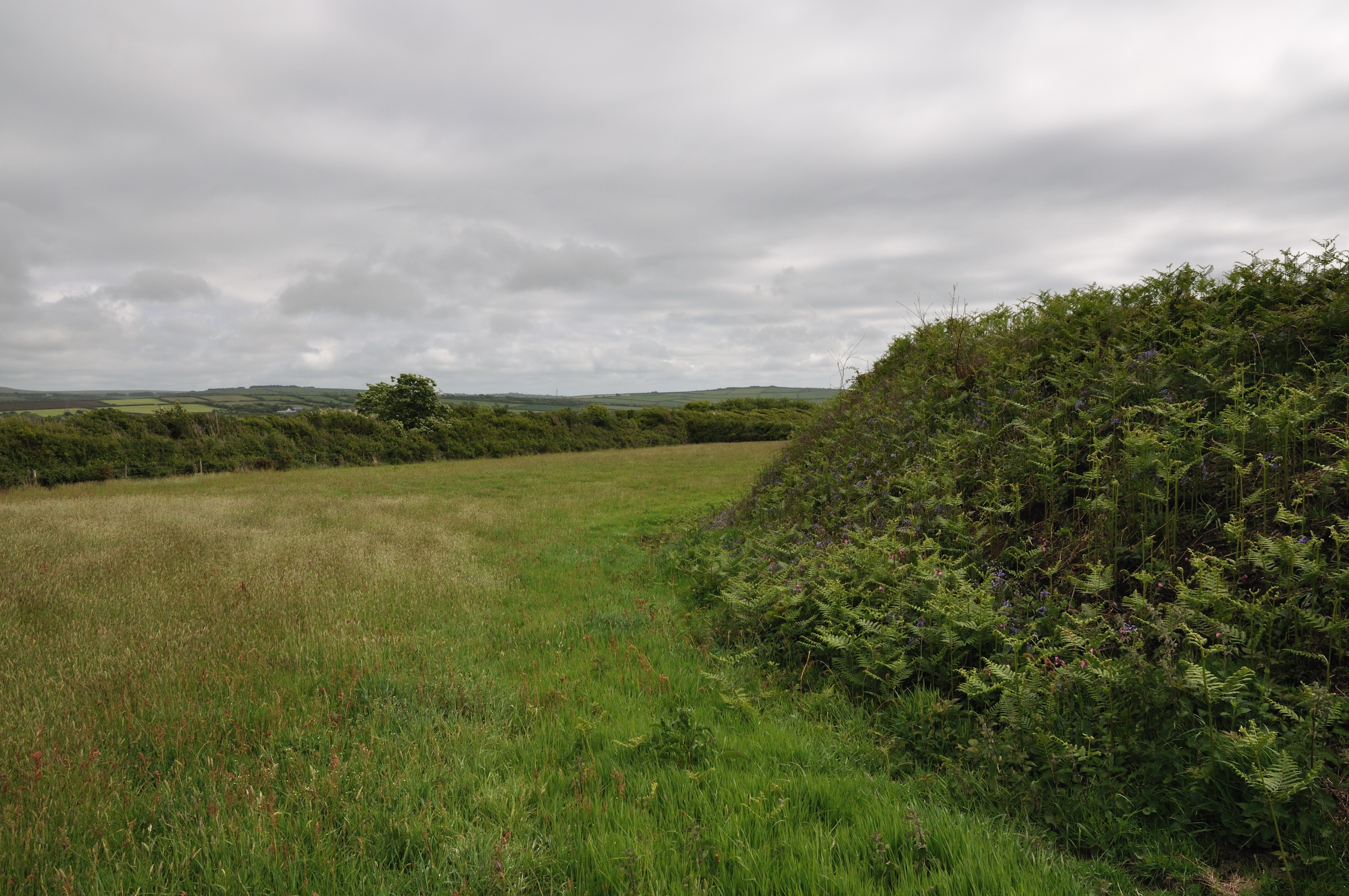

- Location within Cornwall
- 50°36′42″N 4°42′39″W
- Type: Enclosure
- Periods: Iron Age
- Location: Near Camelford, Cornwall
- OS grid reference: SX 083 826

Site notes
- Diameter: 60 metres (66 yd)

Scheduled monument
- Official name: Round called Castle Goff
- Designated: 10 January 1972
- Reference no.: 1004274

Castle Goff is an enclosure about 1.5 miles (2.4 km) south-west of Camelford, in Cornwall, England. It is a scheduled monument.

== Location and description ==
Castle Goff is considered to be a "round": these are small circular embanked enclosures, with one entrance; they date from the late Iron Age to the early post-Roman period. They are most common in Cornwall.

It is situated on the southern edge of a ridge between two tributaries of the River Allen. Its diameter is about 60 metres (66 yd). The rampart is 1.8 metres (5.9 ft) above the interior, and 3.5 metres (11 ft) above the external ditch, which is about 8 metres (26 ft) wide and 0.8 metres (2.6 ft) deep.

From the original western entrance, which is now blocked, there is a causeway to an annexe to the west. The annexe, 106 metres (116 yd) north to south, is a rampart and outer ditch; the ends do not encroach on the ditch of the main earthworks, suggesting that it was a later construction. The rampart of the annexe is partly incorporated into the present field boundary.

Another round, Delinuth Camp, is about 400 metres (440 yd) to the north-west.
