= St Thomas of Canterbury's Church, Camelford =

St Thomas of Canterbury’s Church, Camelford
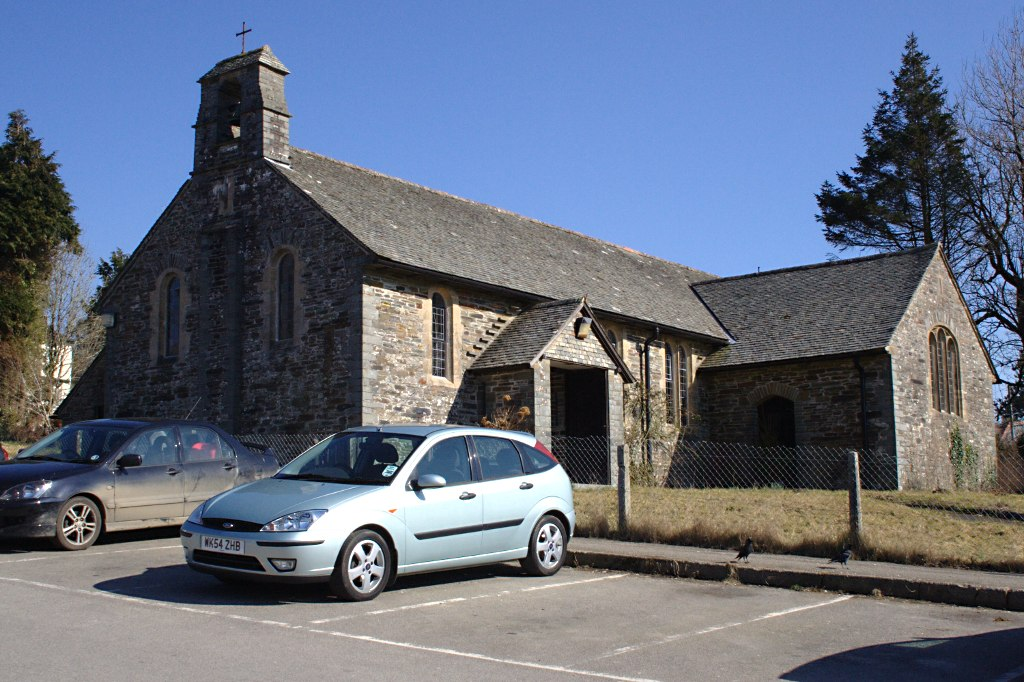
- St Thomas of Canterbury’s Church, Camelford

- Location within Cornwall
- 50°37′26.6″N 04°40′38″W
- Location: Camelford, Cornwall
- Country: England
- Denomination: Church of England

History
- Dedication: St Thomas of Canterbury
- Consecrated: 6 August 1938

Architecture
- Architect: Sir Charles Nicholson, 2nd Baronet

Administration
- Province: Canterbury
- Diocese: Truro
- Archdeaconry: Bodmin
- Deanery: Trigg Minor and Bodmin
- Parish: Lanteglos by Camelford with Advent

St Thomas of Canterbury's Church, Camelford is a church in the Church of England Diocese of Truro in Camelford, Cornwall. It is a chapel-of-ease in the parish of Lanteglos-by-Camelford.

== History ==
The church was built between 1937 and 1938 to the designs of the architect Charles Nicholson. The Cowlard family of Launceston). gave the medieval font. Pevsner describes it as

A minor delight. It sits well on a slightly elevated site above the main road, its modest scale and use of local Delabole slate combining well with an understated Romanesque style...

There was in medieval times a chapel of St Thomas in the town which probably fell into disuse after the Reformation (it is recorded in 1312).

== Parish status ==
The church is in a joint benefice with:

- St Adwen's Church, Advent
- St Julitta's Church, Lanteglos-by-Camelford

== Stained glass ==
The church has two good windows by famous designers:

- Chancel east window, 1938 by Martin Travers
- South Chapel east window, 1938 by Theodora Salusbury
