= Treforda =

Hamlet in Cornwall, England

Treforda is a hamlet in the civil parish of Camelford, Cornwall, England, United Kingdom.

Treforda is also a farm in the parish of Forrabury and Minster, Cornwall.
