= St Teath and Tintagel (electoral division) =

Electoral ward

- ward Cornwall Council
- Boundary of St Teath and Tintagel in Cornwall from 2021.
- County: Cornwall

Current ward
- Created: 2021
- Councillor: Dominic Fairman (Liberal Democrats)
- Number of councillors: One
- Created from: Tintagel; St Teath and St Breward

St Teath and Tintagel is an electoral ward in Cornwall in England for the Cornwall Council. It was created for the 2021 Cornwall Council election combining parts of the former Tintagel district and all of St Teath and St Breward.

== Councillors ==
Election	Member	Party
2021	Dominic Fairman	Liberal Democrats

== Election results ==
=== 2021 ===
2021 election: St Teath and Tintagel
Party	Candidate	Votes	%	±%
Liberal Democrats	Dominic Fairman*	1,141	49.4	N/A
Conservative	Daniel Laughton	924	40.0	N/A
Green	Michael Williams	247	10.7	N/A
Majority		217	9.4	N/A
Turnout		2,312	45	N/A
Liberal Democrats win (new seat)				
