= Trewassa =

Hamlet in Cornwall, England

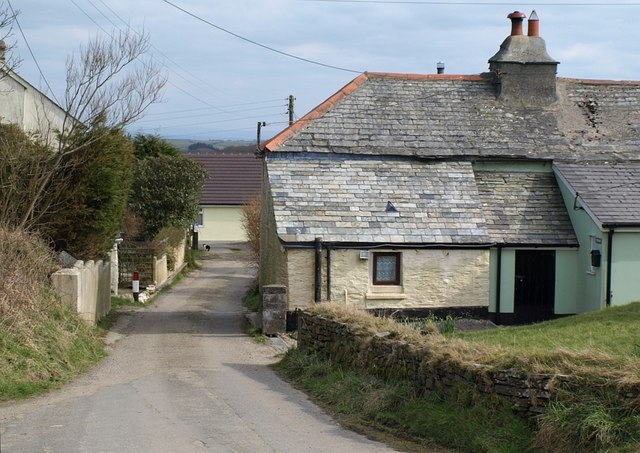
Trewassa

Trewassa is a hamlet near Davidstow, Cornwall, England, United Kingdom.
