= Tremail =

Coordinates: 50.648°N 4.601°W

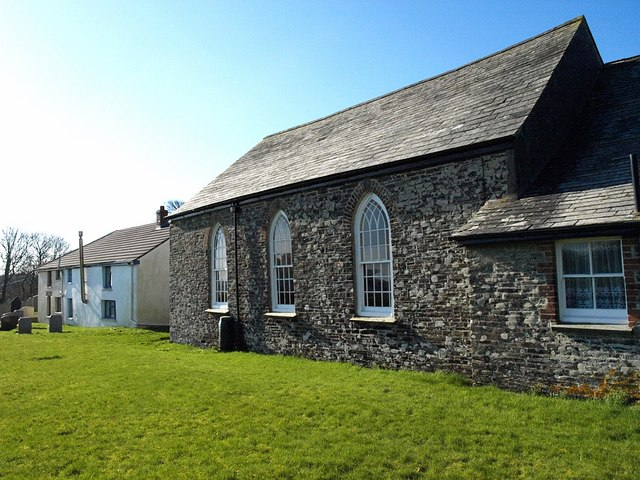
- Tremail Methodist Church

- Location within Cornwall
- OS grid reference: SX162864
- Unitary authority: Cornwall
- Ceremonial county: Cornwall
- Region: South West
- Country: England
- Sovereign state: United Kingdom

Tremail is a hamlet in Cornwall, England, UK. It is about one mile southeast of Davidstow. Higher Tremail Farm and Trewinnow are nearby.
