= Slaughterbridge =

Village in the United Kingdom

Coordinates: 50.638°N 4.678°W

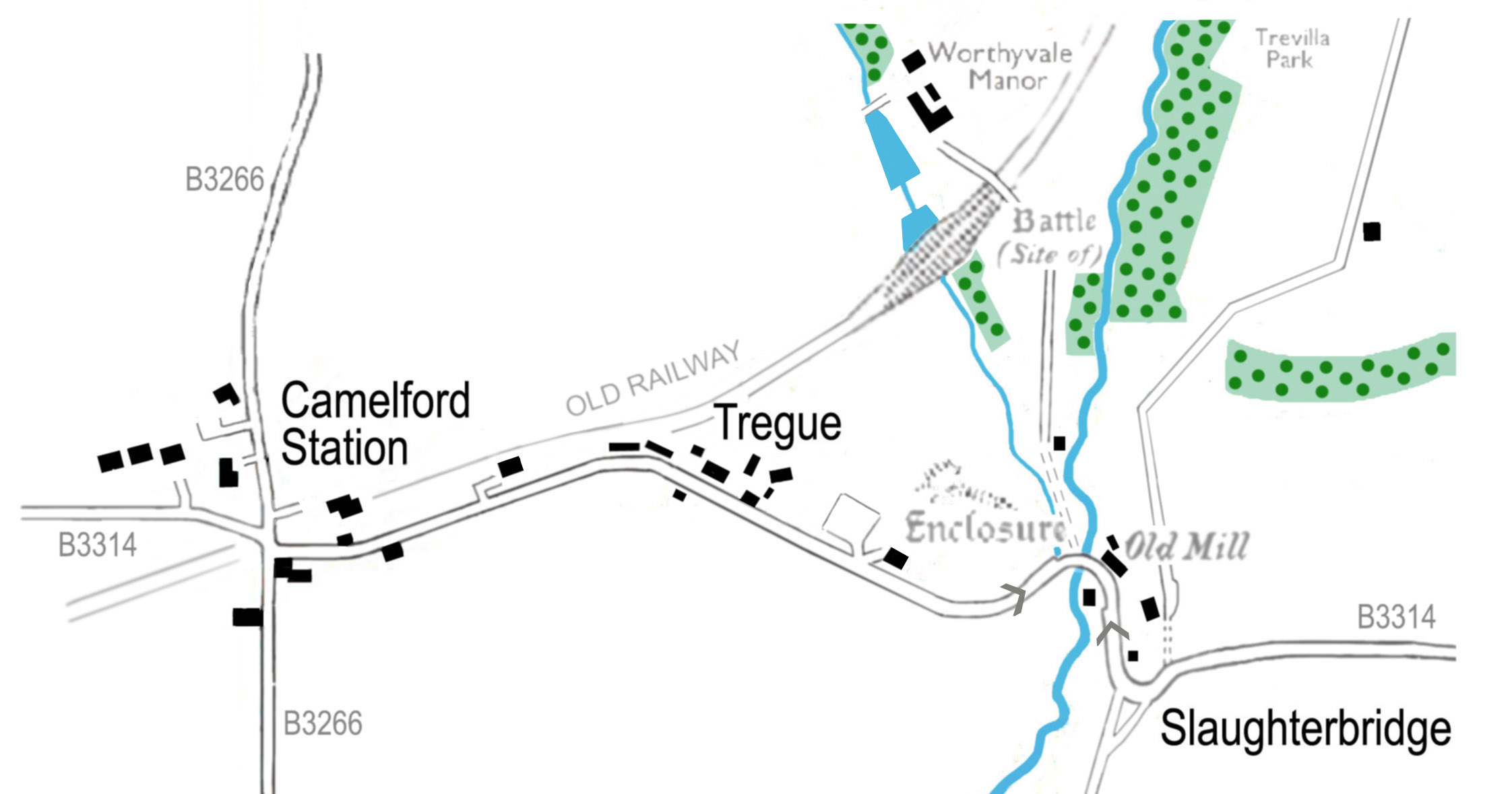
Sketchmap of Slaughterbridge, Treague, and Camelford Station

Slaughterbridge (Cornish: Tre war Ponshal), Treague and Camelford Station (Cornish: Gorsav Reskammel) are three adjoining settlements in north Cornwall, England. They straddle the boundary of Forrabury and Minster and Lanteglos by Camelford civil parishes just over a mile (2 km) north-west of the market town of Camelford.

The settlements are on the B3314 road from the A39 to Delabole (now part of a busy route from the A30 near Launceston to north Cornwall).

== Description and history ==
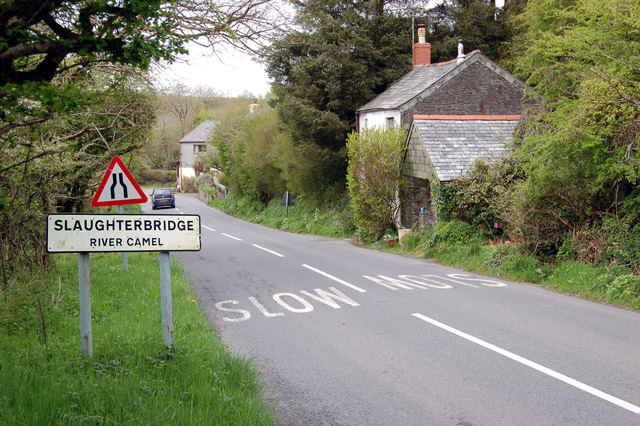
Approaching Slaughterbridge from the south on the B3314

At Slaughterbridge the B3314 road drops dramatically into the valley of the River Camel, describing a steeply graded 'S' bend and narrowing over the eponymous single-track bridge over the river.

Slaughterbridge takes its name from 'slohtre' the Old English word for 'marsh' rather than a reference to killing. There is no evidence for battles fought here (see Gafulford for details).

Worthyvale Manor (mentioned in the Domesday Book although the current building is 17th century) lies north of the bridge and there are several other sites of archaeological interest to the north and east of the river.

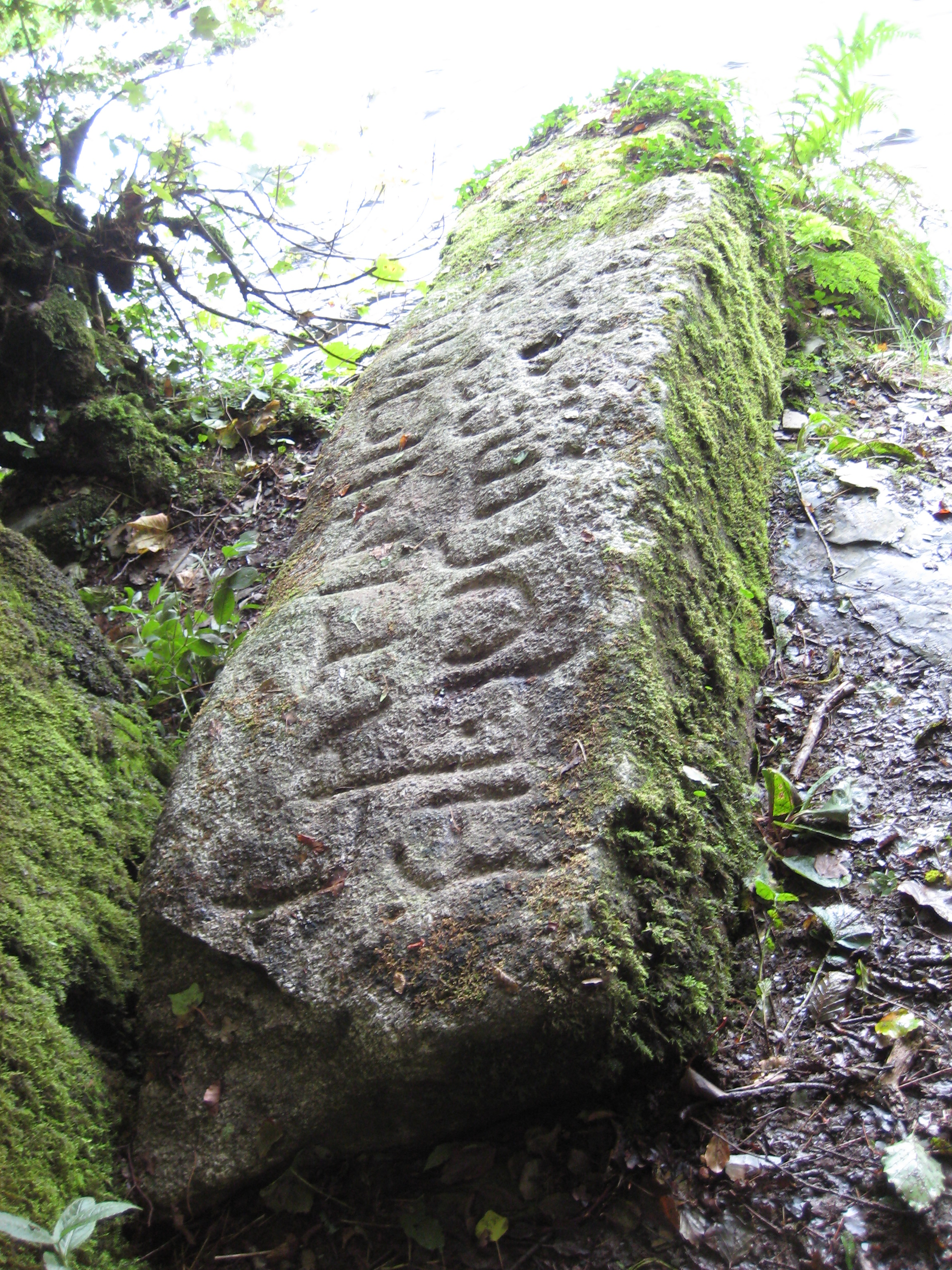
The inscribed stone at Slaughterbridge near Worthyvale

Not far from Worthyvale beside the river at Slaughterbridge is a memorial stone which bears ogham and Latin inscriptions (Latini [h]ic iacit fili Macari = Latinus son of Macarus lies here). The stone lies in the remains of an 18th-century garden created by Charlotte Boscawen, Dowager Lady Falmouth, widow of Hugh Boscawen. It dates from the sixth century and is thought to commemorate an otherwise unknown Celtic chieftain. Legendary and folk associations link this stone with the place where King Arthur met Mordred for the decisive Battle of Camlann in 537. Often referred to as 'King Arthur's Stone', it was first recorded by Cornish antiquary Richard Carew in 1602 but had lain on the river bank for at least a thousand years prior to that. The stone was added to the Historic England Heritage at Risk register in 2020, the stone being particularly at risk from flooding.

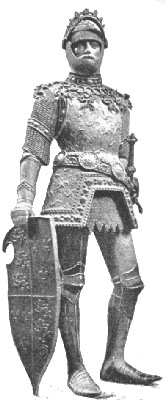
Statue of King Arthur at Innsbruck designed by Albrecht Dürer and cast by Peter Vischer the Elder, 1520s

A medieval narrative account of King Arthur's life is found in Historia Regum Britanniae ("History of the Kings of Britain") by Geoffrey of Monmouth completed around 1138. Geoffrey favours a river bridge as the site of Arthur's last battle: "Arthur was filled with great mental anguish by the fact that Mordred had escaped him so often. Without losing a moment, he followed him to that same locality, reaching the River Camlann, where Mordred was awaiting his arrival." Geoffrey claimed to have based his account on a 'very ancient book' in the British language (i.e. Cornish or Welsh), but much of his 'History' is pure invention. If Arthur was a historical figure he preceded Geoffrey by more than 500 years. Alfred, Lord Tennyson described King Arthur's Stone after a visit to Slaughterbridge in June 1848. Among Tennyson's best-known work is Idylls of the King, a work devoted to the legend of King Arthur.

It is also thought by some that Camelford was the site of Arthur's fabled court of Camelot, both because of the similarity of name and the proximity of Slaughterbridge.

=== Treague ===
The hamlet of Treague is on the north side of the B3314 road, at the top of the hill up from Slaughterbridge. There is a commercial Arthurian Centre at Treague with car parking, a gift shop and tea rooms. It features a display of Arthur memorabilia.

To the east of Treague are the earthworks and enclosure of a small medieval settlement called Old Melorne. A medieval village is first recorded here in 1296 but by the 18th century, documents refer only to a farm at the site. The name is commemorated by present-day Melorne Farm, a few hundred yards west at Camelford Station crossroads.

=== Camelford Station ===
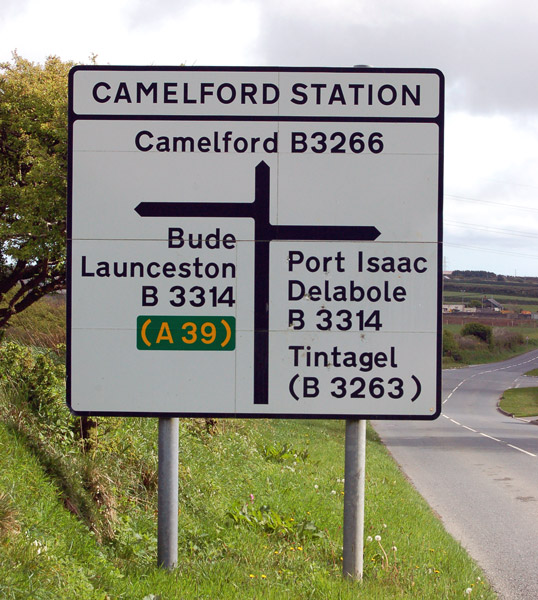
The road sign on the approach to Camelford Station at the junction of the B3266 and B3314 roads

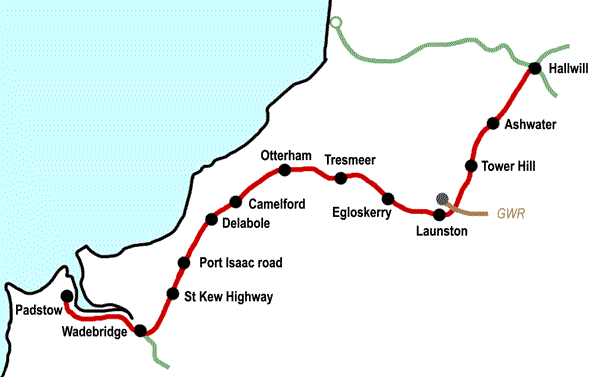
Map of the stations on the North Cornwall Railway

Camelford Station is half-a-mile east of Treague at the junction of the B3314 and the B3266 from Camelford to Boscastle at OS grid ref SX099855. The former station gives its name to the crossroads, a fact recognised on the roadsigns at the junction, and a hamlet. The settlement consists of a farm (Melorne) and its buildings, the former station building and a few other properties including a Methodist chapel.

The former Camelford railway station was on the ex-LSWR North Cornwall line which ran from Halwill to Wadebridge and Padstow. Camelford Station was opened in 1893 and it closed in October 1966 when services on the line from Halwill to Wadebridge ended.

Although named after nearby Camelford, the station was in Minster parish well over a mile from the town it served. It was located "at a road junction in wild country almost devoid of trees" which remains an apt description of the exposed location. Camelford railway station served not only Camelford, but also Tintagel and Boscastle (which did not have a closer rail link) with bus services operated by Southern National connecting the villages with the station.

The main station building was substantially built from local stone and provided accommodation for the stationmaster. It is now a private residence and home to the British Cycling Museum. This small museum is a private enterprise set up by an enthusiastic couple and consists of a comprehensive collection of over 400 vehicles, cycling memorabilia and an old cycle repair workshop. The museum is now closed.

West of Camelford station are a few isolated dwellings and the village of Delabole.

== The bridge at Slaughterbridge ==
The three-span stone bridge over the River Camel at Slaughterbridge is Grade II listed being one of six listed bridges on the river, the largest number on any Cornish river.

== Gallery of images ==
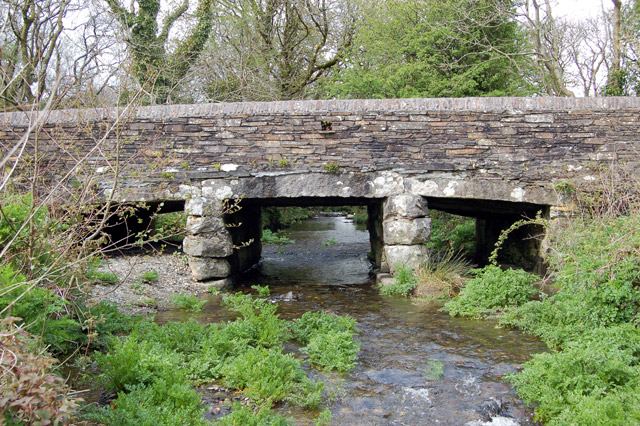
The bridge carrying the B3314 road over the River Camel at Slaughterbridge.

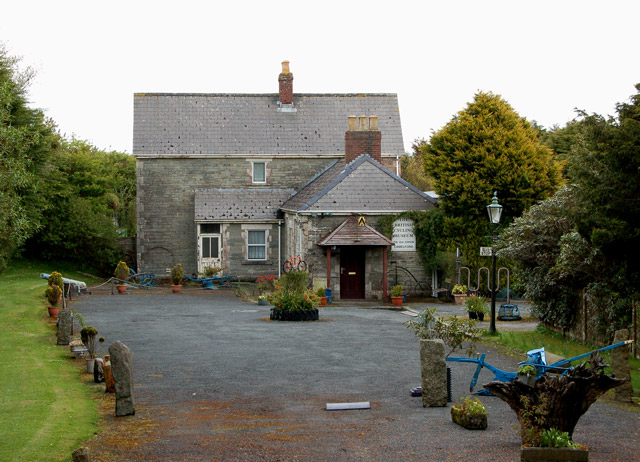
The former main building at Camelford Station later became a cycling museum.

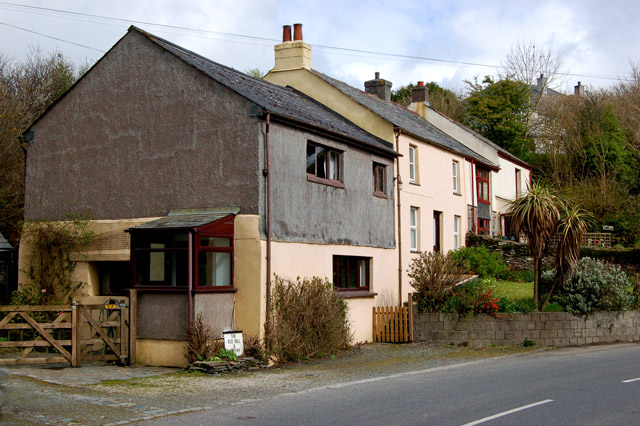
Looking uphill from the River Camel at the Old Mill beside the B3314.

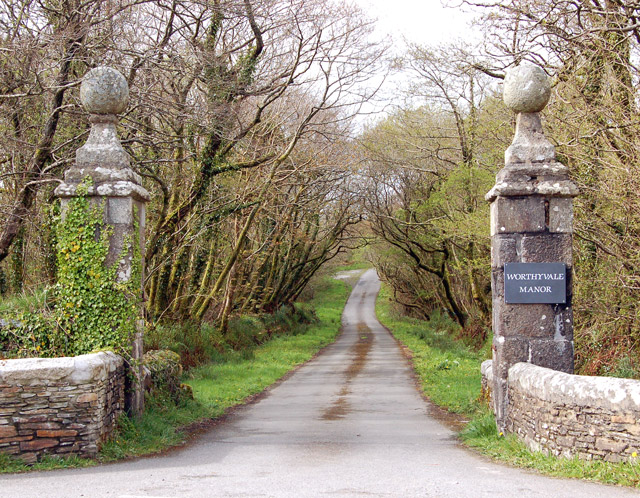
The gates to Worthyvale Manor near the River Camel, Slaughterbridge
