= Helstone =

Hamlet in north Cornwall, England

Coordinates: 50.60018°N 4.70284°W

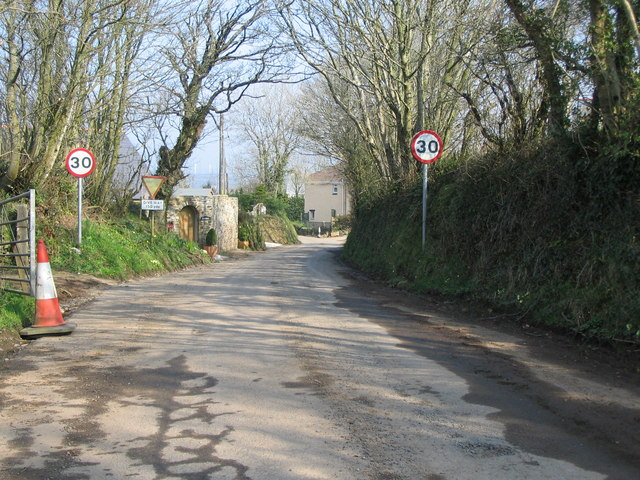
Approaching Helstone village

Helstone (Cornish: Hellys) is a hamlet in north Cornwall, England, United Kingdom. It is situated two miles (3 km) southwest of Camelford on the A39 road.

== History ==
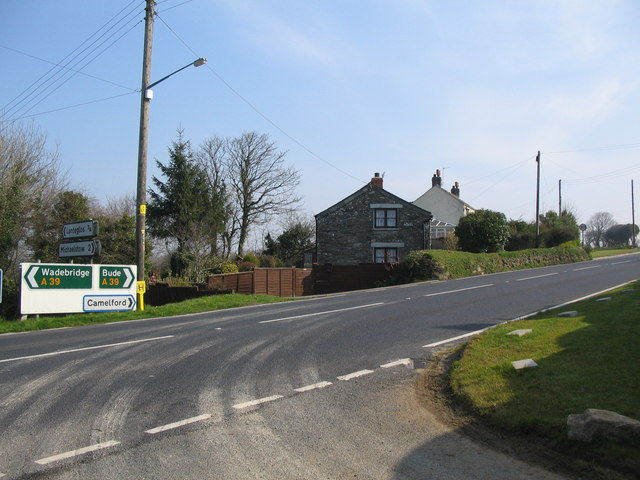
Helstone

Helstone (or Helston in Trigg) was in the Middle Ages one of the chief manors of the Hundred of Trigg and perhaps in Celtic times the seat of a chieftain. In the Domesday Book this manor was held by Earl Robert of Mortain: there were 2 hides, land for 15 ploughs; the lord had 4 ploughs & 18 serfs; 20 villagers & 18 smallholders had 8 ploughs; 10 acres (40,000 m^{2}) of woodland; 6 square leagues of pasture; five kinds of livestock, in total 195 beasts. The manor of Penmayne was a dependency of this manor. It was one of the 17 Antiqua maneria of the Duchy of Cornwall.

The name Helstone is related to that of the Iron Age fort Hellesbury: it is from the Cornish hen + lys (old court) with the later addition of Anglo-Saxon tun.

In medieval times there were deer parks which contained fallow deer for hunting and eating. Two of these were at Helston in Trigg (Lanteglos), one of them was among the oldest deer parks in Cornwall and the other a new park. The then existing ducal parks were disparked by King Henry VIII about the year 1540 so that they became pasture for cattle.
