= Valley Truckle =

Coordinates: 50.613°N 4.688°W

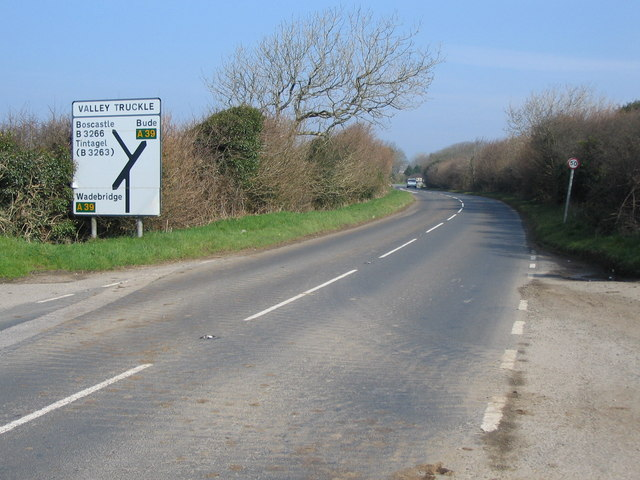
- The B3266 road approaching Valley Truckle from the south

- Location within Cornwall
- OS grid reference: SX099827
- Unitary authority: Cornwall
- Ceremonial county: Cornwall
- Region: South West
- Country: England
- Sovereign state: United Kingdom

Valley Truckle is a hamlet on the A39 road south of Camelford in Cornwall, England. Its name probably derives from a corruption of Cornish "Vellan draeth" (i.e. fulling mill). This was suggested by Charles Henderson.
