= Tregoodwell =

Hamlet in Cornwall, England

Coordinates: 50.622°N 4.669°W

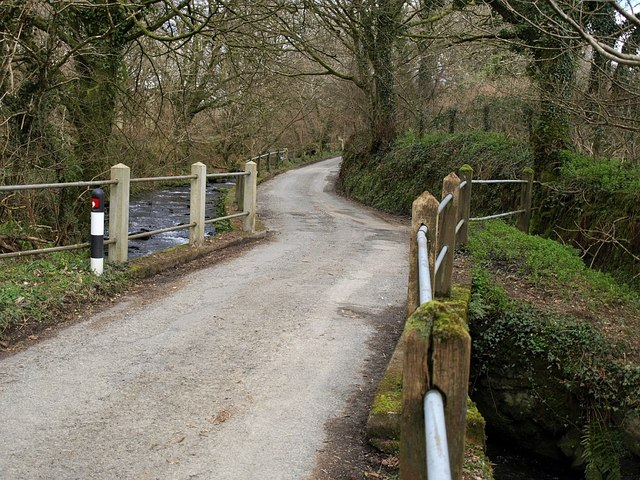
- Bridge over Tregoodwell Brook, near Camelford, Cornwall

- Location within Cornwall
- OS grid reference: SX113837
- Unitary authority: Cornwall
- Ceremonial county: Cornwall
- Region: South West
- Country: England
- Sovereign state: United Kingdom

Tregoodwell is a hamlet half a mile east of Camelford in Cornwall, England, UK. It is on the road towards Rough Tor.

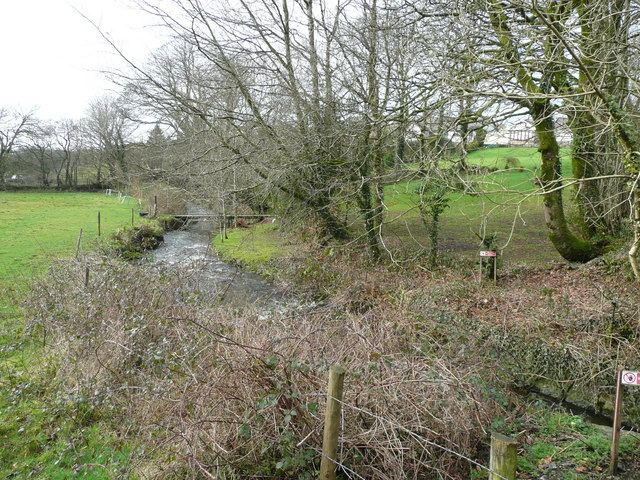
The brook near Tregoodwell
