= Treneglos =

Village in Cornwall, England

Coordinates: 50.665°N 4.538°W

Treneglos: Cornish: Treneglos
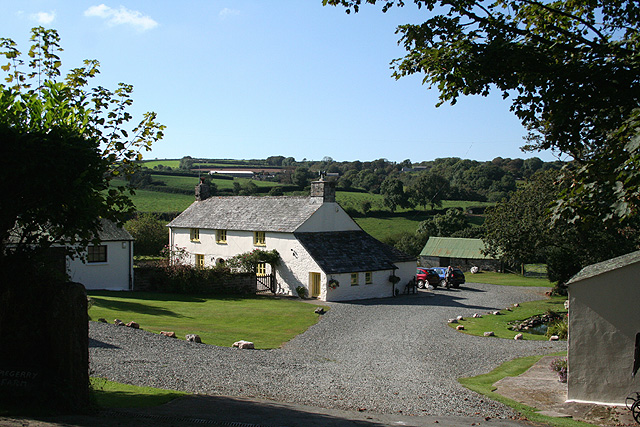
- Tregerry, Treneglos

- Location within Cornwall
- Population: 122 (Parish, 2021)
- OS grid reference: SX207881
- Civil parish: Warbstow
- Unitary authority: Cornwall
- Ceremonial county: Cornwall
- Region: South West
- Country: England
- Sovereign state: United Kingdom
- Post town: LAUNCESTON
- Postcode district: PL15
- Dialling code: 01566
- Police: Devon and Cornwall
- Fire: Cornwall
- Ambulance: South Western
- UK Parliament: North Cornwall

Treneglos (Cornish: Treneglos) is a village in the civil parish of Warbstow, in north-east Cornwall, England. It is in the Registration District of Launceston. In 2021 the parish had a population of 122. On 1 April 2025 the parish was abolished and merged with Warbstow and Davidstow.

Treneglos is described as a village "where the old Cornish "trev" [settlement] is no more than a triangular green beside a church and two or three houses". It is above a wooded valley, a choice place where ancient Celtic tribes sought shelter. Nearby, at Wilsey Down, is evidence of prehistoric tumulus. Now, it is not unusual to see sheep wandering along the country roads.

== History ==
Treneglos, from "tre-an-eglos", means church, a particularly strong, solid church, or church town. The parish of Treneglos included Wilsey Down, on which were "four or five ancient barrows or tumuli".

=== Tregulland Burrow ===
From an abstract of the journal article The Excavation of Tregulland Burrow, Treneglos Parish, Cornwall, Paul Ashbee's findings at the prehistoric Treneglos barrow are described as:

The ruined and gutted barrow called Tregulland Burrow, when totally excavated, proved to have had a complex structure. Stake holes denoting withdrawn stakes, an infilled 'ritual' pit, a satellite grave containing a cremation and arrowheads, and most probably the central grave pit, were the features of the first phase of its construction. A cairn-ring, with a buttressing bank, the soil for which was dug from an encircling ditch, and its turf covering, comprised the second. A great slab bearing cup-marks and an 'eyebrow' motif, also other lesser cup-marked and ornamented slabs, were incorporated in cairn-ring and bank. Cup-marked stones recovered from the disturbed central area suggested the one-time existence of a stone-built grave incorporating such elements. After this second phase the barrow centre was open and arena-like, and a food vessel and a cremation were put in close by the cairn-ring. All was finally enveloped by material from the depths of the ditch. Poorly built walling or turves retained the final mound.

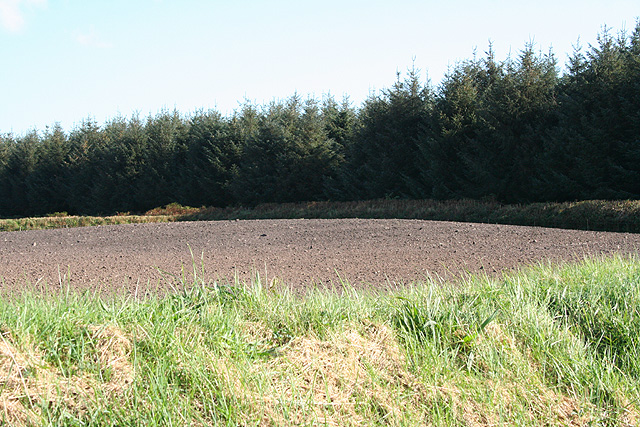
Treneglos: site of a tumulus. At the edge of the large plantation on Wilsey Down, the tumulus appears to have been ploughed out

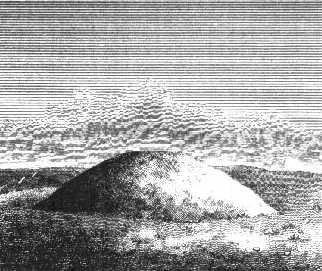
Engraving of a bowl barrow or cairn-ring by Richard Colt Hoare

=== St Gregory's Church ===
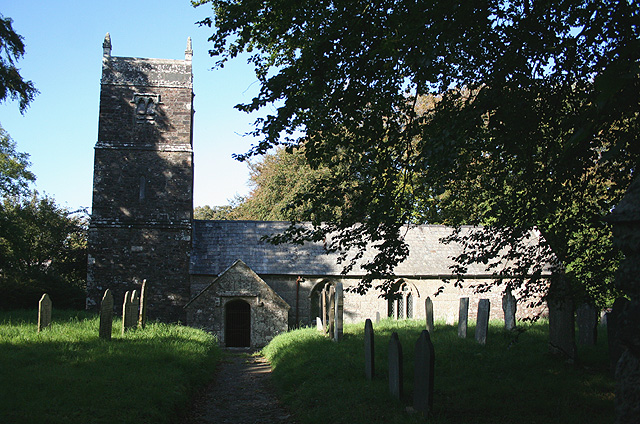
St Gregory's Church, Treneglos

The parish was in the 12th century in the possession of Robert Fitz-William, Lord of Downinney (also Downeckney), who gave it to the priory of Tywardreath. (Note: A Complete Parochial History of the County of Cornwall (1872) states that: "Richard, Steward of the Household, who owned the manor of Downeckney at the time of the Domesday survey, gave this church to the Priory of Tywardreath. From him, the lands descended to the Dinhams and Cardinhams, and then the Braddons.) Warbstow was then a chapelry dependent on Treneglos; the two benefices were later combined as a vicarage (united benefice). Robert was responsible for building the church.

The church was enlarged in the 15th or 16th centuries to include a moulded basket arch added to the north door, the addition of a north aisle with Perpendicular tracery and, near the east end, a rood loft stair turret. In the 16th century the south porch was added; this has an arch to the south door over which is a Norman tympanum. The Norman tympanum and font were perhaps by the same craftsman as those at Egloskerry and Tremaine. The sculptured Norman tympanum, similar to other works in nearby churches, is described as "a conventional tree in the centre, with a pair of beasts having their tails bent round between the legs, and upwards across their bodies, placed symmetrically facing each other." The meaning may be found in the Psalms verse about the vine of Egypt: "The boughs thereof were like goodly cedars... The boar of the wood doth waste it, and the wild beast of the field doth devour it."

During the 17th century, adherents of Roman Catholicism became very scarce in Cornwall; the religious census of 1671 recorded recusants in the parish of Treneglos and four others. The Reverend J. H. Mason was the vicar in the early 19th century; he was appointed in 1804 by the Prince of Wales (who later became king as George IV).

The church, rebuilt in 1858, is dedicated to St George and St Gregory. The church consists of a nave, chancel and north aisle. Four four-centred arches on granite pillars make up the arcade. The original tympanum and font were preserved. In 1871 the tower was being rebuilt. By 1872 the Warbstow and Treneglos parishes made one benefice. The Duke of Cornwall was the patron of the vicarage, with its 31-acre glebe. In 1960 it was listed as a Grade II building.

=== Church Town Farm ===
The historic stone Church Town Farmhouse, a Grade II listed building, was built in the late 16th century or early 17th century. It was probably originally a 2-room or more house that was later remodelled and enlarged in the 19th century. It has a slate roof and the rear doorway has a granite arch from the 17th century. There are other British Listed Buildings in Treneglos.

=== 19th century ===
In the 19th century Treneglos was in the deanery of Trigg Major and was part of Lesnewth Hundred. The parish of Treneglos was reported to be 2362 statute acres by 1838. (Note: Davies Gilbert stated it was 2362 statute acres in his 1838 book; The book edited by Joseph Polsue of 1872 stated it was 2342 statute acres, of which 10 acres was orchards and gardens, 100 acres of meadow and pasture, 700 acres of moor or common land and 1532 of arable land.) The population between 1801 and 1831 ranged from a low of 183 people (1831) to 238 people (1821).

==== 19th century Methodist Church ====
The stone United Methodist Church was completed in 1881. It is a single-storied chapel with a rectangular floor plan, window arches, a triple lancet window, porch and a gabled, slate roof. It was listed as a Grade II building on 11 January 1989. The single storied Sunday school building may have been used for worship before the church's completion in 1881.

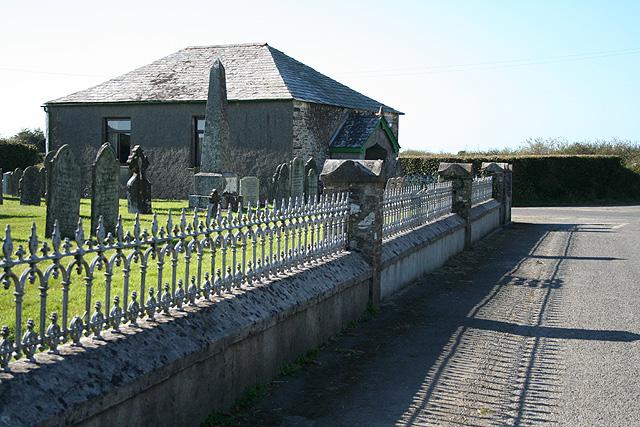
Goads Green Bethel Methodist church graveyard, Treneglos (north of Hallworthy)

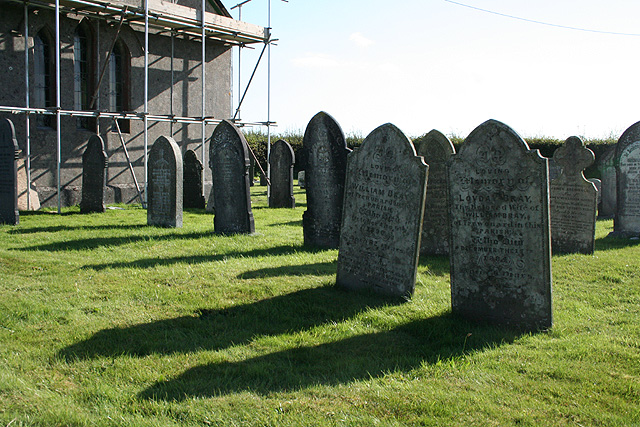
Bethel chapel graveyard, Goads Green

== Geology ==
Dr Henry Samuel Boase wrote in Davies Gilbert's The Parochial History of Cornwall (1838) that the geology in the southern part of Treneglos is felspathic rock and is otherwise calcareous (mostly or partly composed of calcium carbonate) rock.

== Geography ==
The civil parish was bounded to the north by Warbstow parish, to the east by Tremaine and Tresmeer parishes, and to the west by Davidstow parish. The population of Treneglos parish in the 2001 census was 101, increasing to 122 in 2021.

The hamlet of Treneglos is situated 2 miles (3 km) east of Hallworthy, a hamlet at a crossroads on the western edge of the parish. The plantation on Wilsey Down (919 ft) lies between the two hamlets and the parish church of St Gregory is at Treneglos. The North Cornwall Railway from Launceston to Padstow had stations at Tresmeer and Otterham Station; the line between them ran through the parish of Treneglos. This part of the railway line was opened on 14 August 1893 and closed on 3 October 1966.

== Gallery ==
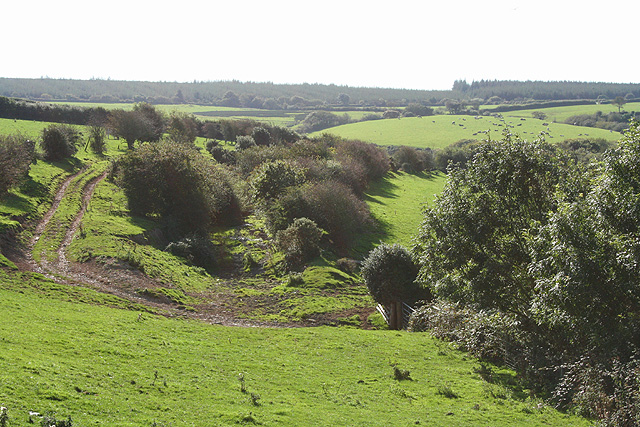
Treneglos - towards Treskellow

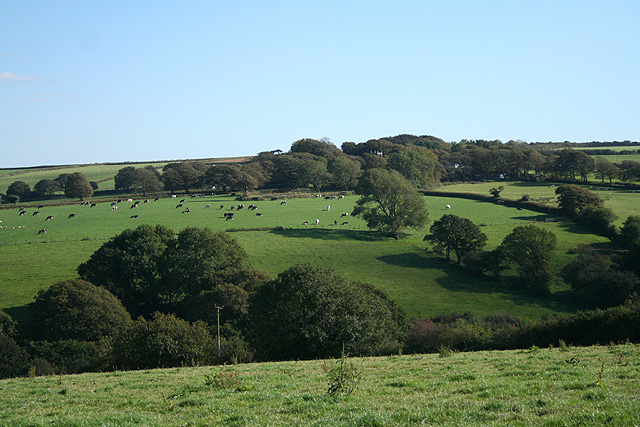
Treneglos: towards the church. The top of the church tower is just visible among the trees to the right of centre

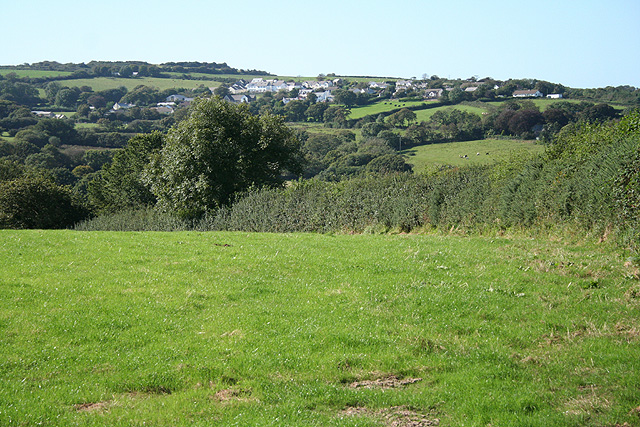
Treneglos: towards Warbstow Cross. On the skyline, left, is the hillfort Warbstow Bury. Largely hidden by trees, above the hedge, are buildings at Trewen; a farm which once had a mill barn powered by a waterwheel fed by a stream from the village

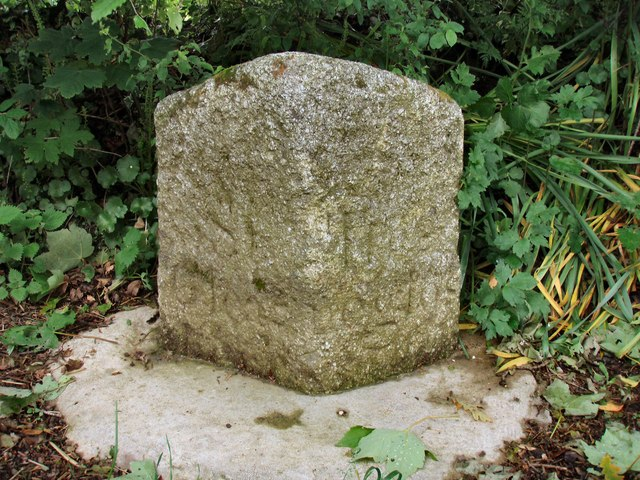
Cold Northcott milestone about 1 mile south and east of Treneglos before Cold Northcott / Craigmoor Cottage

== See also ==
- Bodmin Moor
- Christianity in Cornwall
