= Treveighan =

Village in Cornwall, England

Coordinates: 50°35′07″N 4°43′15″W

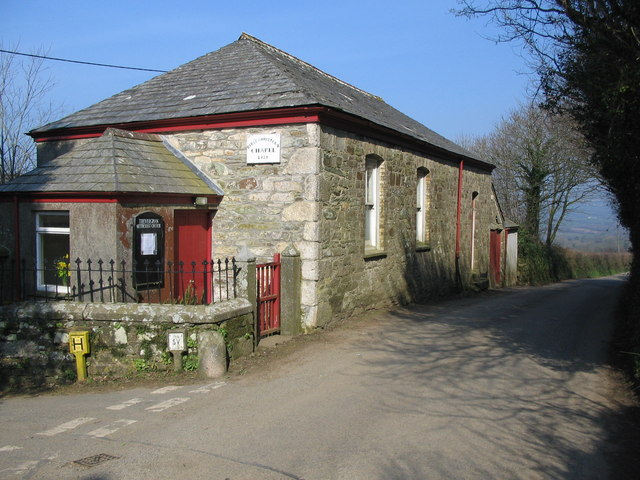
Treveighan Methodist chapel

Treveighan (Cornish: Trevegan) is a village in the parish of Michaelstow, Cornwall, England, United Kingdom. It is half a mile northwest of Michaelstow.
