= Advent, Cornwall =

Civil parish in Cornwall, England

Coordinates: 50.603°N 4.679°W

Advent: Cornish: Sen Adhwynn
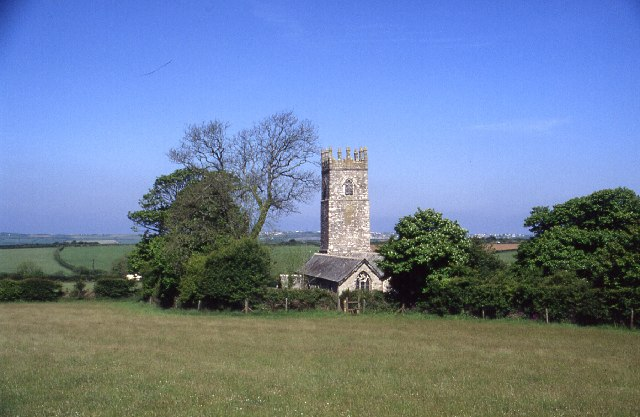
- St Adwenna's Church

- Location within Cornwall
- Population: 189 GENUKI
- OS grid reference: SX 104 816
  - London: 207 mi (333 km) W
- Civil parish: Advent
- Unitary authority: Cornwall
- Ceremonial county: Cornwall
- Region: South West
- Country: England
- Sovereign state: United Kingdom
- Post town: CAMELFORD
- Postcode district: PL32
- Dialling code: 01840
- Police: Devon and Cornwall
- Fire: Cornwall
- Ambulance: South Western
- UK Parliament: North Cornwall

Advent (Cornish: Sen Adhwynn) is a civil parish on the north-western edge of Bodmin Moor in north Cornwall, England, United Kingdom. The English name St Adwenna derives from the Cornish Adhwynn and lies in the Registration District of Camelford.

Advent is a sparsely populated rural parish. Much of the area is moorland and at the 2001 census the population was just 153. This increased to 189 at the 2011 census. It includes the hamlets of Tresinney, Pencarrow, Highertown and Watergate but there is no village called Advent. The parish also encompasses several small farmstead hamlets, numerous scattered farms and Pencarrow House. (Note, the Pencarrow House that is a minor stately home and open to the public, is not in the hamlet of Pencarrow in Advent Parish, it is some miles away near Bodmin.)

Tresinney hamlet lies above the River Camel, 1 mile (1.6 km) south from Camelford, and Advent parish church is north of the hamlet. Three recreational footpaths – the Watermill Walk, Camelford Way and the Moorland Walk – run through Tresinney. In a field on the west side of the parish church stands a tall and elegant Cornish cross.

The parish is bordered to the north and the east by Davidstow parish; to the south by St Breward parish; and to the north-west by the River Camel and Camelford parish.

== St Adwenna's Church ==
The Grade I listed parish church is dedicated to St Adwen, one of the daughters of King Brychan of Brycheiniog, often conflated with St Dwynwen, the patron saint of Love. The church stands in fields on farmland 440 yards (400m) north-east from the hamlet of Tresinney at grid reference SX 104 816. The church is in the Anglican Diocese of Truro and is notable for its high, pinnacled tower which houses a ring of four bells: the greater part of the building dates from the 15th century. The south aisle was added at that time; the north transept was Early English but was rebuilt in 1870, at which time the south transept was demolished, The font is Norman, plain and circular.

The ecclesiastical parish is the responsibility of the Rector of Lanteglos-by-Camelford, and Advent has been associated with Lanteglos since medieval times.

== Common surnames in Advent Parish ==
According to the UK Census:

Alford, Inch, French, Pethick, Northey, Gillard, Rowe, Bone, Bate, Baker, Scott, Prout, Kellow, Kingdon, Hole, Martyn, Elford, Ford, Wills, Hawken, Trace, Gabriel, Miller, Arnall, Browning.
