= Tresmeer =

Hamlet in Cornwall, England

Coordinates: 50.660°N 4.500°W

Tresmeer: Cornish: Trewasmeur
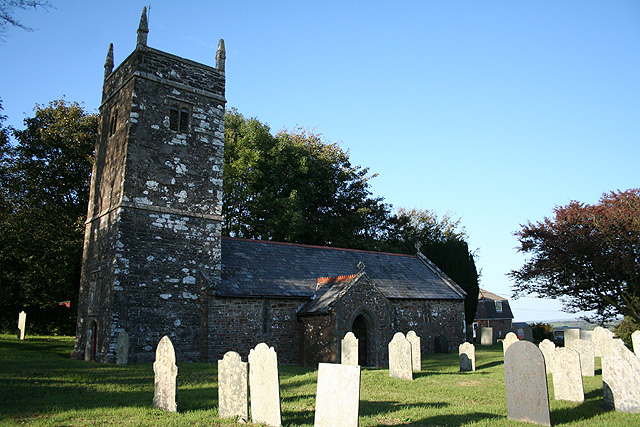
- Tresmeer Church

- Location within Cornwall
- Population: 271 (Civil Parish, 2011)
- OS grid reference: SX234875
- Civil parish: Tresmeer
- Unitary authority: Cornwall
- Ceremonial county: Cornwall
- Region: South West
- Country: England
- Sovereign state: United Kingdom
- Post town: LAUNCESTON
- Postcode district: PL15
- Dialling code: 01566
- Police: Devon and Cornwall
- Fire: Cornwall
- Ambulance: South Western
- UK Parliament: North Cornwall

Tresmeer (sometimes spelled Tresmere) (Cornish: Trewasmeur) is a hamlet and a civil parish in northeast Cornwall, England, United Kingdom. The hamlet is situated approximately seven miles (11 km) northwest of Launceston.

The civil parish is bounded to the north by Treneglos and Tremaine parishes, to the east by Egloskerry, and to the west by Treneglos parish. The population of Tresmeer parish in the 2001 census was 216, increasing to 271 at the 2011 census.

Tresmeer is in the Registration District of Launceston. The parish church of St Nicholas is in the churchtown at OS Grid Ref SX233874.

Tresmeer was served by a railway station at the hamlet of Splatt on the North Cornwall Railway line until closure of the route in 1966.

There is a Cornish cross in the churchyard. According to Arthur Langdon it was formerly in the churchyard of Laneast. He observed it in the 1890s placed at the head of the grave of a late vicar of Tresmeer.
