= Tremaine, Cornwall =

Village in Cornwall, England

Coordinates: 50.673°N 4.497°W

Tremaine: Cornish: Tremen
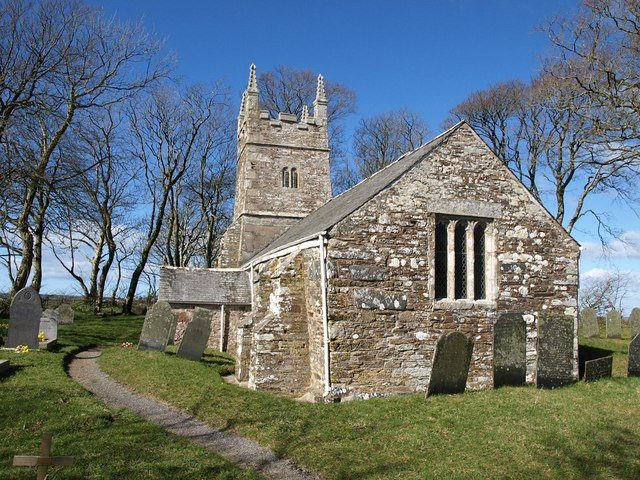
- St Winwaloe church

- Location within Cornwall
- Population: 53 (Civil Parish, 2011)
- OS grid reference: SX237889
- Civil parish: Tremaine
- Unitary authority: Cornwall
- Ceremonial county: Cornwall
- Region: South West
- Country: England
- Sovereign state: United Kingdom
- Post town: LAUNCESTON
- Postcode district: PL15
- Dialling code: 01566
- Police: Devon and Cornwall
- Fire: Cornwall
- Ambulance: South Western
- UK Parliament: North Cornwall

Tremaine or Tremain (Cornish: Tremen) is a small village and a rural civil parish in east Cornwall, England, United Kingdom. It is in the Registration District of Launceston and the population in the 2001 census was 87. It had decreased to 53 at the 2011 census. There is also a dairy farm called Ash Grove farm.

The parish is bounded to the north by Warbstow and Jacobstow parishes, to the east by North Petherwin parish, and to the west by Tresmeer and Treneglos parishes.

Tremaine village is 10 miles (16 km) north-west of the town of Launceston near the River Ottery.

The parish church, St Winwaloe's, stands in the village at OS Grid Ref SX234890. It is a Norman building but some of the windows are later insertions. It is a rare survival in Cornwall of a church consisting only of nave and chancel. The tower is at the west end. The font is Norman and similar to the font of Egloskerry. St Winwaloe is one of the smallest parish churches in Cornwall, measuring just 12 feet wide and 44 feet long. It is named after St Winwaloe, who was born of Cornish parents in 457AD. The stone building was built in the 11th century by the Bottereaux family and the church's tower was added in the 14th century.

== See also ==
- 3806 Tremaine, an asteroid
