= Trewalder =

Coordinates: 50°36′30″N 4°43′29″W

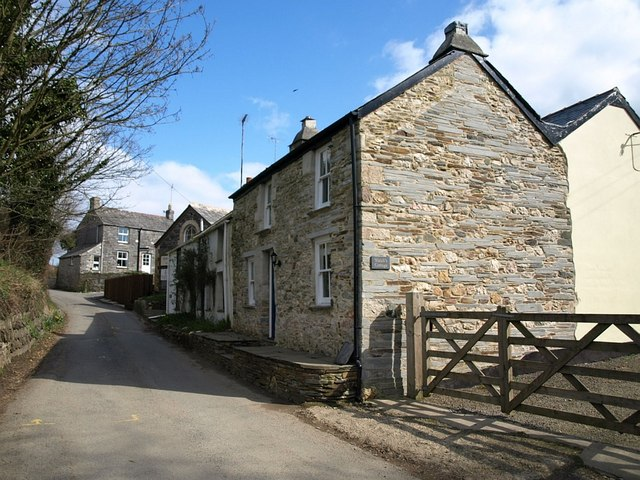
Trewalder

Trewalder is a hamlet in Cornwall, England, United Kingdom. It is about one mile south of Delabole.
