= Davidstow =

Village and civil parish in Cornwall, England

Coordinates: 50.655°N 4.618°W

Davidstow: Cornish: Logdewi
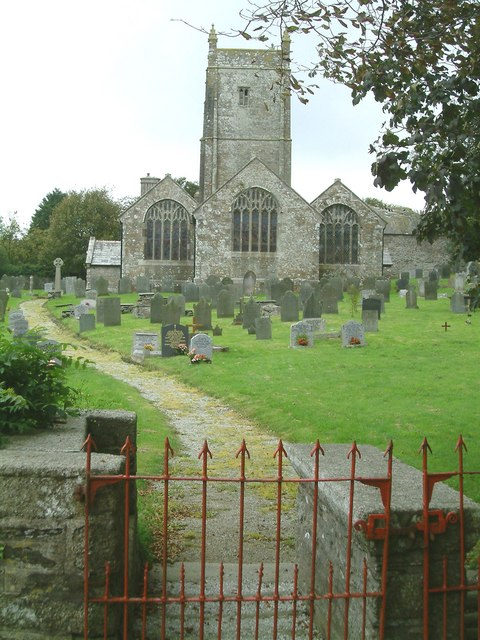
- Davidstow Church

- Location within Cornwall
- Population: 493 (United Kingdom Census 2001)
- OS grid reference: SX151872
- Civil parish: Davidstow
- Unitary authority: Cornwall
- Ceremonial county: Cornwall
- Region: South West
- Country: England
- Sovereign state: United Kingdom
- Post town: CAMELFORD
- Postcode district: PL32
- Dialling code: 01840
- Police: Devon and Cornwall
- Fire: Cornwall
- Ambulance: South Western
- UK Parliament: North Cornwall

Davidstow (Cornish: Logdewi (village) or Pluw Dhewi (parish)) is a civil parish and village in north Cornwall, England, United Kingdom. The village is north of Bodmin Moor straddling the A395 road about 3 miles (5 km) north of Camelford. The hamlets of Hallworthy, Hendraburnick, Tremail and Trewassa are in the parish. It was formerly known as Dewstow(e).

'Davidstow Cheddar' and 'Cathedral City' brands of cheese are produced at Davidstow Creamery which is operated by Dairy Crest using water ultimately from St David's Holy well, next to the parish church.

A military airfield, RAF Davidstow Moor, was built near the village during the Second World War and was later used as a motor racing circuit.

== Parish church ==
'Davidstow' means David's Place and according to legend the church was founded by Saint David in the 6th century, whilst visiting his mother at nearby Altarnun. The church is large but was very much restored in 1875 so that little original work remains inside. Both the nave and the east windows are wider than usual in a Cornish church; a few bench ends are interesting, one portrays a bagpiper. The parish is part of the group in the charge of the Rector of Boscastle.

In former times the remoteness of the parish led to many vicars choosing non-residence. The older name Dewstowe is evidenced by a Guild of Our Lady of Dewstowe in 1545 (when it was abolished). The vicars of the 18th-century were non-resident and even the curates they employed could be absentees (e.g., in 1745 the vicar resided at St Ervan, his curate at Pancrasweek and the curate also minded the parish of Boyton). In 1561 information collected for Archbishop Parker included the fact that the vicar, William Waller, was non-resident and "all things are in ruin".

Arthur Langdon (1896) records two Cornish crosses in the parish, one at Lambrenny and one at Trevivian.

== Treglasta ==
The manor of Treglasta was recorded in Domesday Book (1086) when it was held by Robert, Count of Mortain; before 1066 it had been held by Earl Harold. There were 6 hides of land and land for 20 ploughs. The lord had one hide of land with 2 ploughs and 15 serfs. 24 villeins and 20 smallholders had the rest of the land with 12 ploughs. There were 300 acres of pasture, 4 unbroken mares, 4 cattle and 50 sheep. The value of the manor had been 12 silver marks (i.e. £8 sterling) but was in 1086 worth £15-18-4d.

== Gallery ==
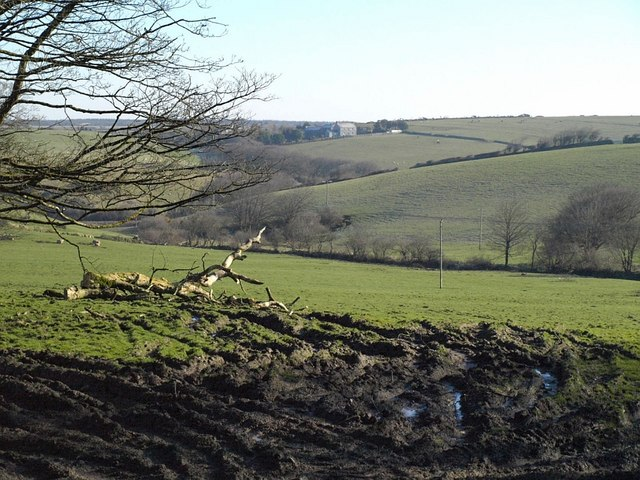
The view from Trevivian across the Inny valley towards Treglasta

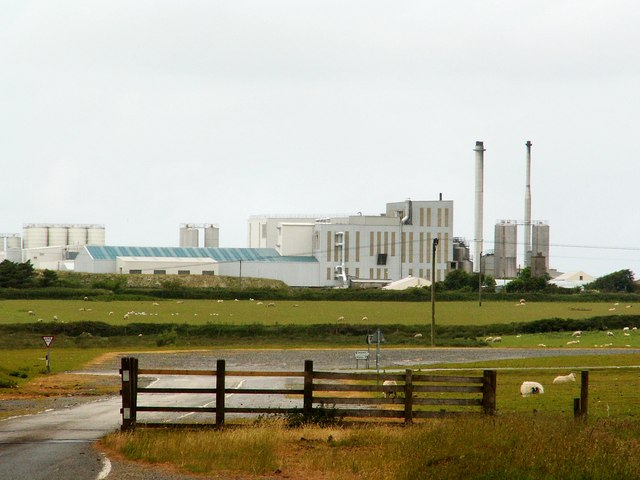
Davidstow Creamery

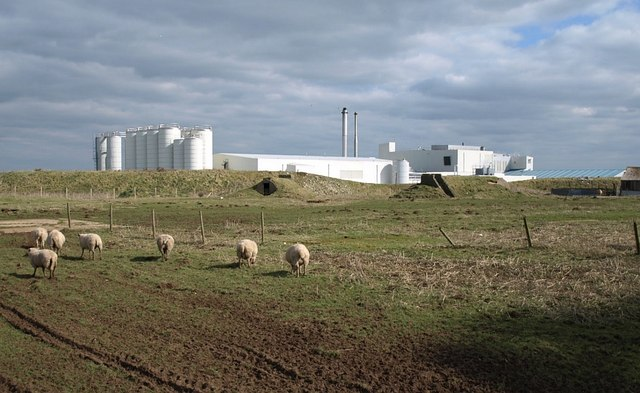
Davidstow Creamery

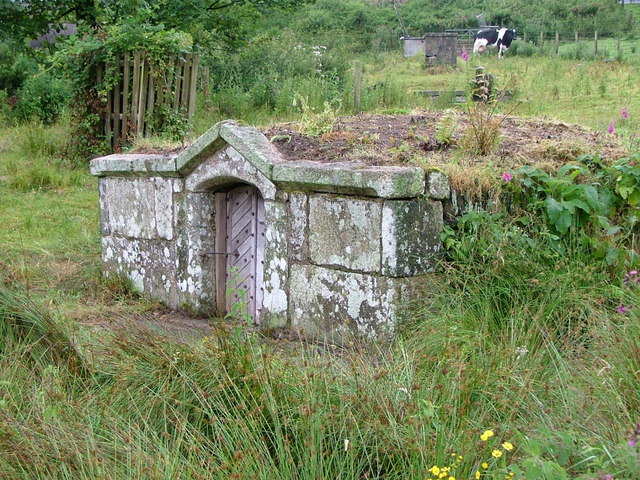
St David's Holy Well
