= Camelford =

Town in Cornwall, England

Coordinates: 50.617°N 4.683°W

Camelford: Cornish: Reskammel
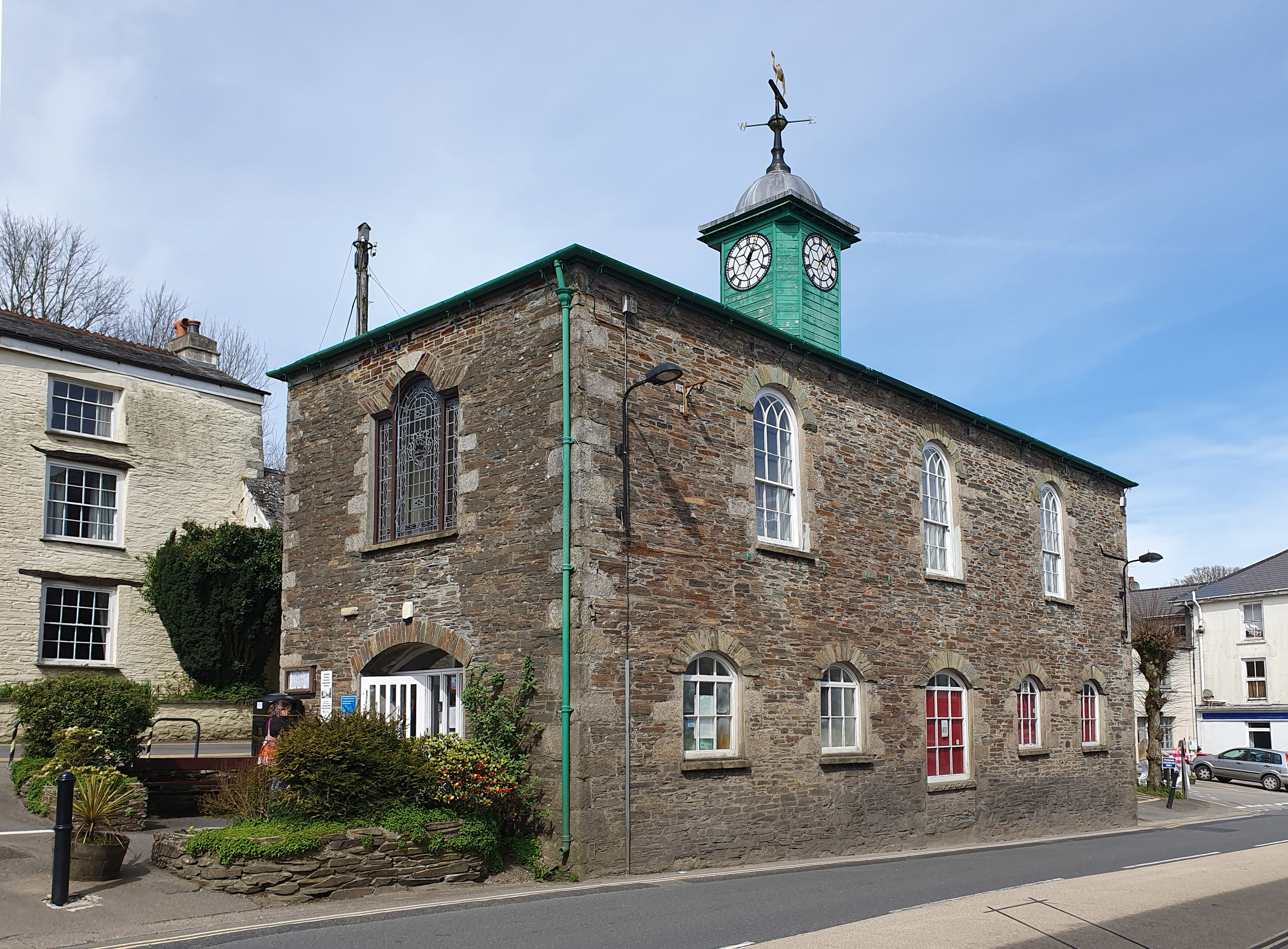
- Camelford Town Hall

- Location within Cornwall
- Population: 3,378 (Parish, 2021); 2,926 (Built up area, 2021)
- OS grid reference: SX101831
- Civil parish: Camelford
- Unitary authority: Cornwall
- Ceremonial county: Cornwall
- Region: South West
- Country: England
- Sovereign state: United Kingdom
- Post town: CAMELFORD
- Postcode district: PL32
- Dialling code: 01840
- Police: Devon and Cornwall
- Fire: Cornwall
- Ambulance: South Western
- UK Parliament: North Cornwall

Camelford (Cornish: Reskammel [rɛzˈkamːɛl]) is a town and civil parish in north Cornwall, England, United Kingdom, situated in the River Camel valley north-west of Bodmin Moor. The town is approximately ten miles (16 km) north of Bodmin. The parish was historically called Lanteglos and was renamed Camelford after its largest settlement in 1934. As well as Camelford and the small village of Lanteglos, the parish also covers surrounding rural areas, including the hamlets of Helstone, Tregoodwell, and Trewalder. At the 2021 census the population of the parish was 3,378 and the population of the built up area was 2,926.

The A39 road (known as the 'Atlantic Highway') passes through the town centre. A bypass has been discussed for many years. Camelford railway station opened in 1893, just over a mile north of the town. It closed in 1966, and the site was subsequently used as a cycling museum.

== Toponymy ==
The Cornish language name for the town, Reskammel, comes from a combination of the Middle Cornish "Rys" (ford) + the River Camel's Cornish name Kammel (crooked, skew-whiff). It is a 20th-century formation.

The English name of Camelford was formed by a Anglicisation of the river's name to Camel + Ford, giving it an identical meaning to its Cornish counterpart. The earliest records of the name are in 1205 and 1256 and it has the meaning "ford over the (river) Camel".

Due to the river's name sounding similar to the English word camel, the animal is seen as a symbol of the town. As such it can be seen on the town's coat of arms and the Sir James Smith's School logo, among other uses in the area.

== Geography ==
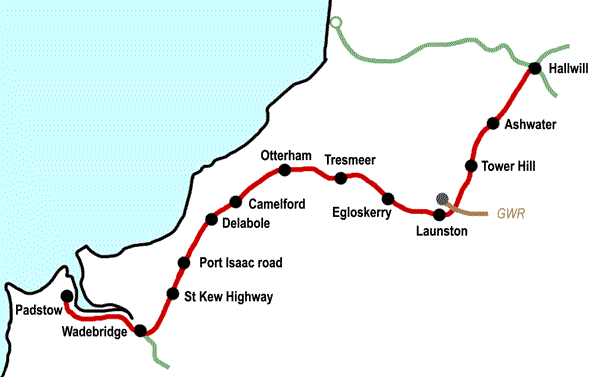
Map of stations on the North Cornwall Railway

Its position near the highest land in Cornwall makes the climate rather wet. On 8 June 1957, 203 millimetres (8.0 in) of rain fell at Camelford. Roughtor is the nearest of the hills of Bodmin Moor to the town and numerous prehistoric remains can be found nearby as well. Camelford Town Hall was built in 1806, but is now used as a branch public library. By the riverside is Enfield Park; hamlets in the parish include Helstone, Tregoodwell, Valley Truckle, Hendra, Lanteglos, Slaughterbridge, Tramagenna, Treforda and Trevia. The economy depends largely on agriculture and tourism. There was a china clay works at Stannon.

=== Places of interest ===
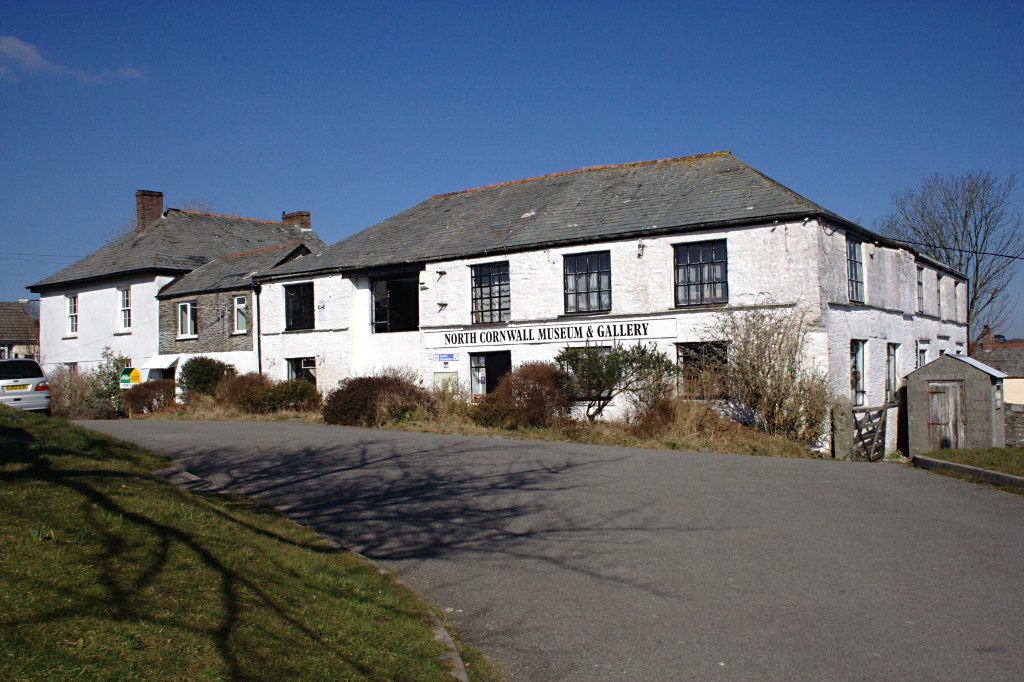
The former North Cornwall Museum and Gallery

Camelford was the home of the North Cornwall Museum and Gallery which contained paintings and objects of local historical interest. It has now been converted to a row of cottages. To the northwest at Slaughterbridge is an Arthurian Centre and at nearby Camelford Station is the Cycling Museum, which, according to Google, is now permanently closed. To the east are the hills of Roughtor and Brown Willy and to the south the old parish churches at Lanteglos and Advent.

=== Transport ===
The main road through Camelford is the A39 (Atlantic Highway) and there is a thrice-daily bus service from Newquay to Exeter via Launceston that serves the town. A tentatively-planned bypass is on hold; traffic problems continue to crowd the town especially during summer weekends. From 1893 to 1966 the town had a station on the North Cornwall Railway, and from the 1920s a bus ran a shuttle service to and from the town. Since the closure of the North Cornwall line the nearest railway station is Bodmin Parkway, 14 miles (23 kilometres) distant.

== History ==
=== Early history ===
Camelford has been linked to the legendary Camelot and the battle of Camlann, such as in Layamon's Middle English Brut (early 13th century), and John Aubrey's Monumenta Britannica (1663–1693), which reports that as signs of the battle "pieces of armour both for horse and man are many times found in digging of the ground" at Camelford. However, modern historians have refuted these suggestions.

Camelford has sometimes been linked to Gafulford the site of a battle against the West Saxons. This link goes at least as far back as the 16th Century and William Camden's Britannia, but the battle is currently considered more likely to have been at Galford in Devon. Nearby Slaughterbridge has been supposed to be the site of a battle; an error arising because the derivation of "slaughter" in this case from an Anglo-Saxon word for "marsh" was not understood.

==== Manor of Helston in Trigg ====
Helstone (or Helston in Trigg) was in the Middle Ages one of the chief manors of the Hundred of Trigg and perhaps in Celtic times the seat of a chieftain. In the Domesday Book this manor was held by Earl Robert of Mortain: there were 2 hides, land for 15 ploughs; the lord had 4 ploughs & 18 serfs; 20 villagers & 18 smallholders had 8 ploughs; 10 acres (40,000 m^{2}) of woodland; 6 square leagues of pasture; five kinds of livestock, in total 195 beasts. The manor of Penmayne was a dependency of this manor. It was one of the 17 Antiqua maneria of the Duchy of Cornwall.

=== Modern history ===
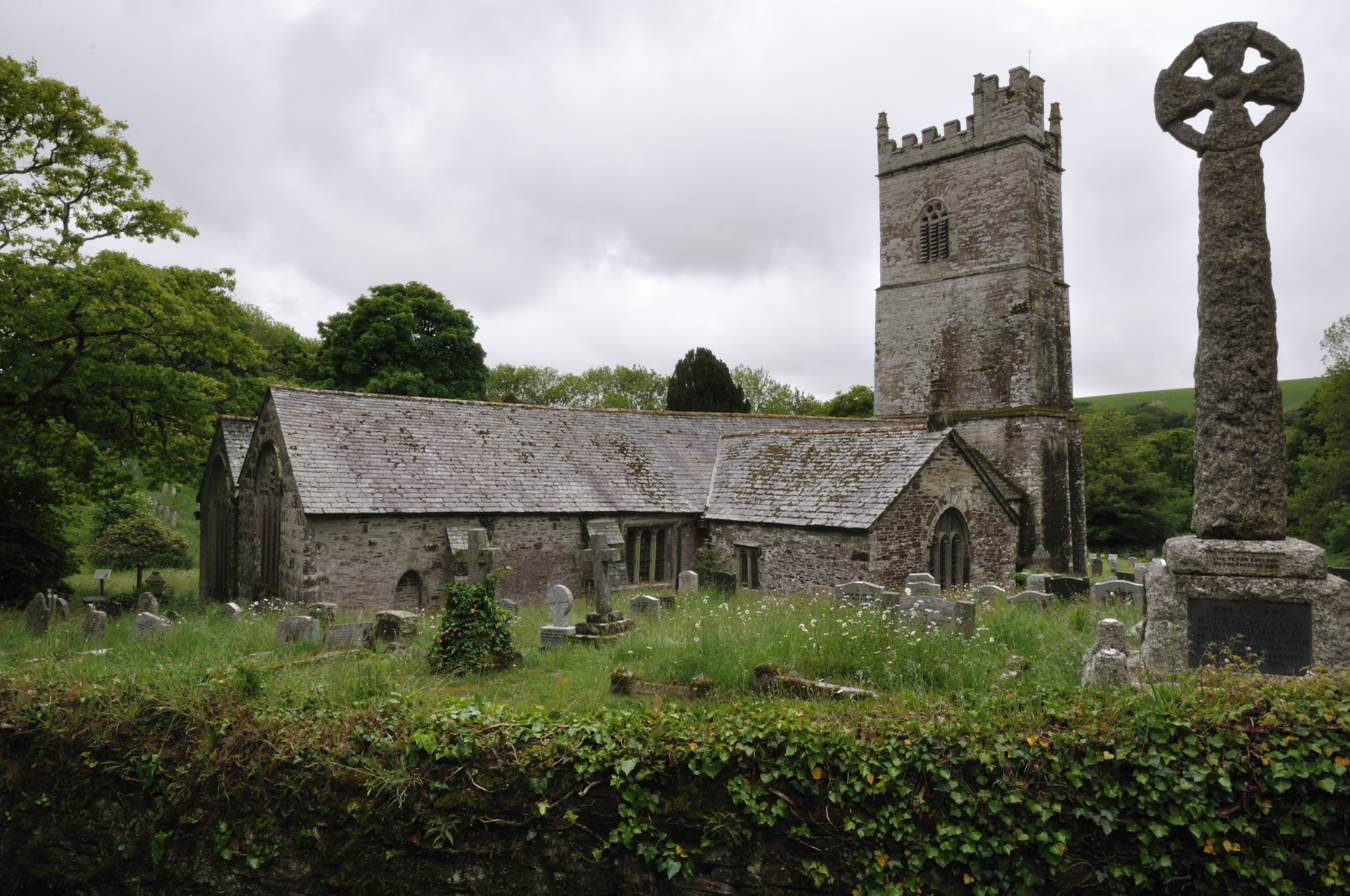
The war memorial in St Julitta's churchyard

In February 1837, protests against the New Poor Law and the workhouse system were held in Camelford. The protests were to prevent entry to William Gilbert, a Poor Law Commissioner, and to hinder the enforcement of the New Poor Law. Between 400 and 500 people attended the protests, with some playing drums and fifes. Many of the protestors were labourers from the neighbouring quarries. In response to the protest, sixty soldiers from the 99th Regiment and six police from London were sent to Camelford. While The West Briton claimed the protestors held "riotous intentions", there were no reports of violence. Only one man was arrested, James Silbey, a miller from St Teath who had spoken publicly multiple times promoting opposition to the New Poor Law and particularly against the workhouse system. James Sibley was arrested and sent to Bodmin Jail. He was granted bail and sent to a trial at a following Assizes court. Despite the protests, a workhouse was eventually built in Camelford. By the 1841 census the population of the town was 705.

The seal of the borough shows: Arg. a camel passing through a ford of water all proper with legend "Sigillum Vill: de Camelford".

Reskammel / Camelford was the venue for Gorsedh Kernow in 2012.

==== Water pollution incident ====
In July 1988, the water supply to the town and the surrounding area was contaminated when 20 tons of aluminium sulphate was accidentally poured into the wrong tank at the Lowermoor Water Treatment Works on Bodmin Moor. An independent inquiry into the incident, the worst of its kind in British history, started in 2002, and a draft report was issued in January 2005, but questions remain as to the long-term effects on the health of residents. Michael Meacher, who visited Camelford as environment minister, called the incident and its aftermath, "A most unbelievable scandal."

== Churches and schools ==
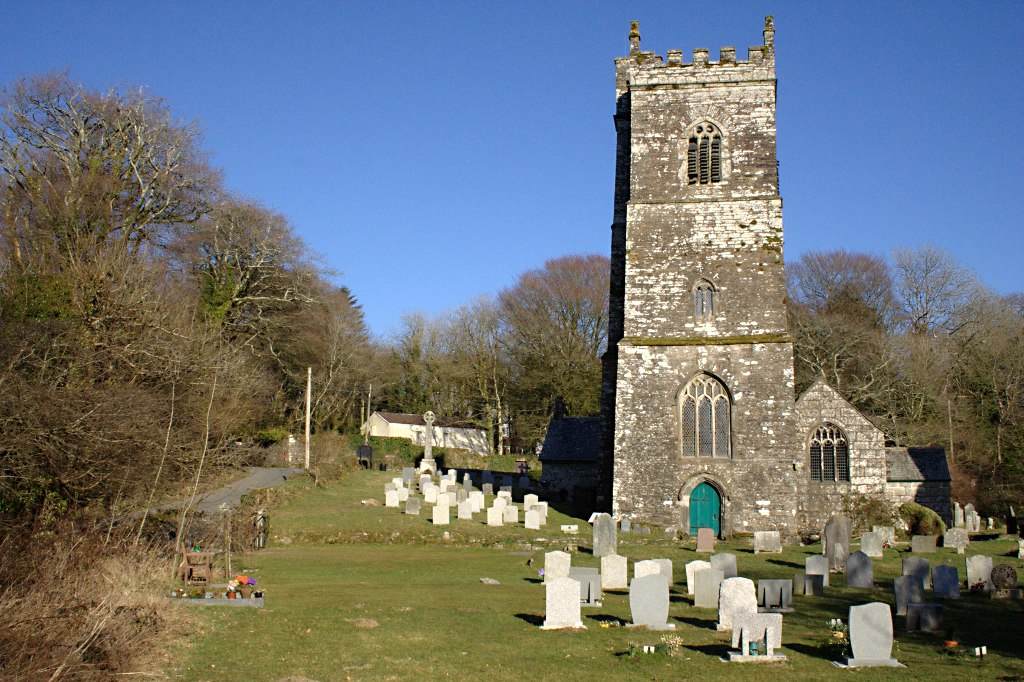
The parish church of St Julitta, Lanteglos

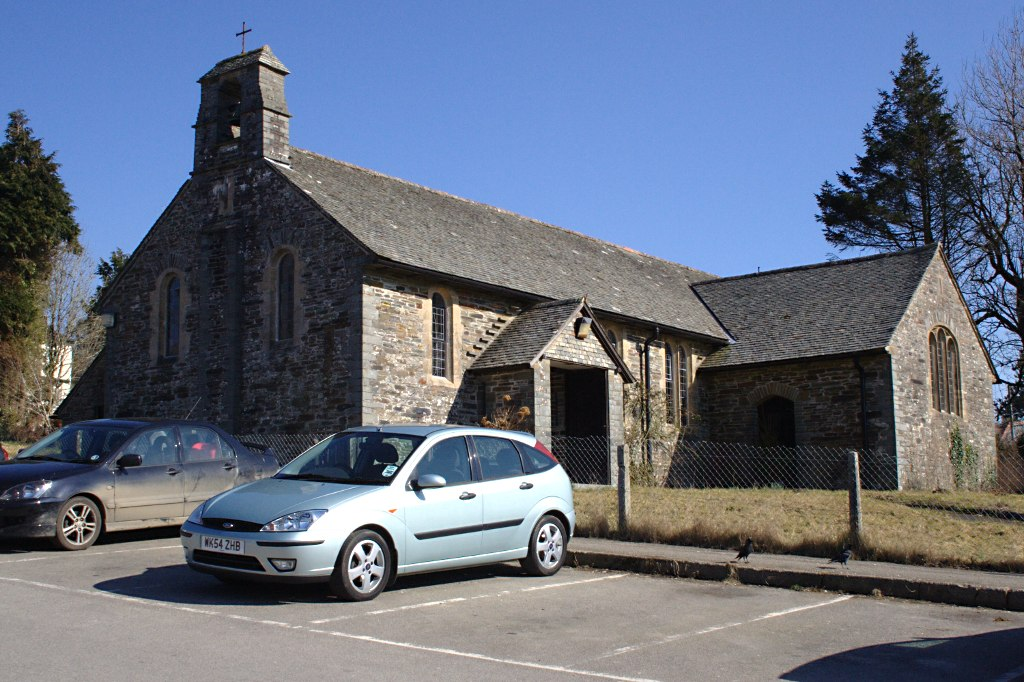
The church of St Thomas of Canterbury

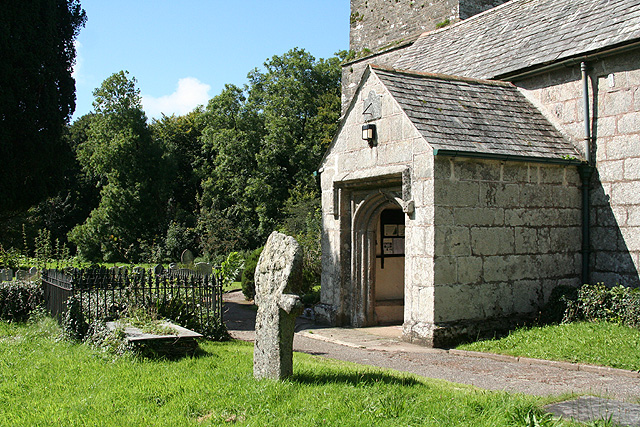
A Cornish cross in the churchyard at Lanteglos; it was found in a blacksmith's shop at Valley Truckle

The parish church of Camelford is at Lanteglos by Camelford though there is also a Church of St Thomas of Canterbury (opened in 1938) in the town. Lanteglos church is dedicated to St Julitta. (At Jetwells near Camelford is a holy well; Jetwells derives from "Julitta's well".) Arthur Langdon (1896) recorded the existence of seven stone crosses in the parish, including three at the rectory (Lanteglos Rectory was converted into a guesthouse in the mid-20th century). There was in medieval times a chapel of St Thomas which probably fell into disuse after the Reformation (it is recorded in 1312). The Rector of Lanteglos is also responsible for the adjacent parish of Advent.

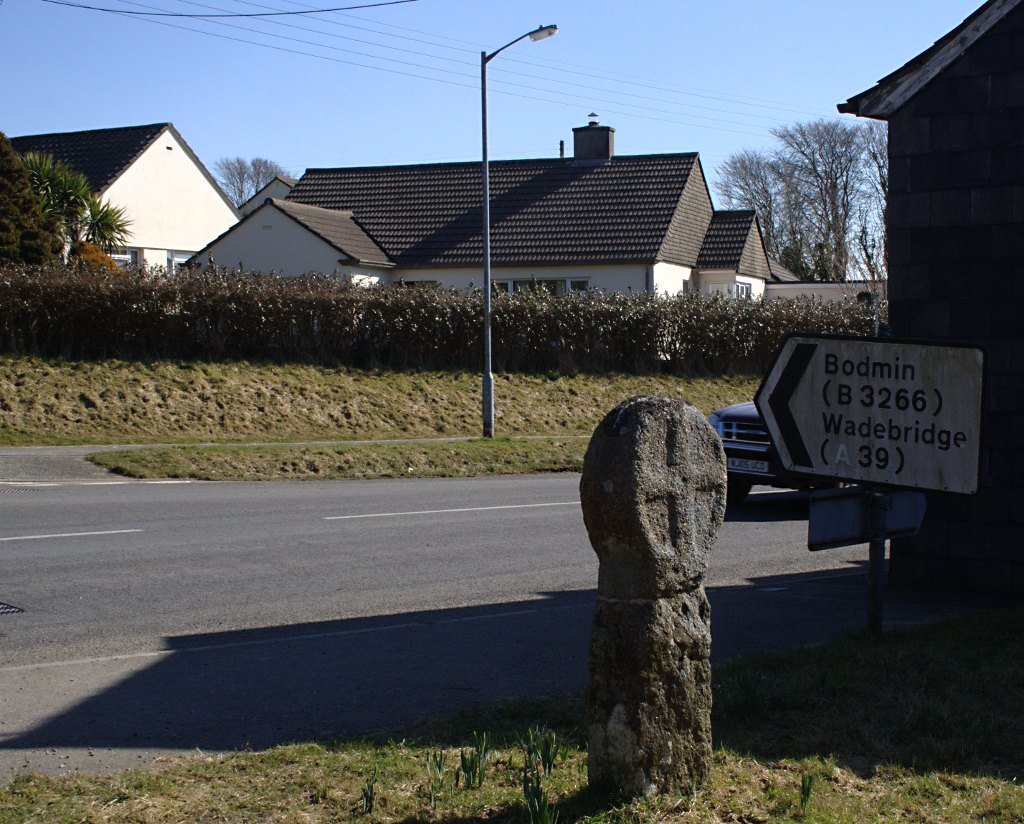
A Cornish cross, Trevia

In Market Place is the Methodist Church (originally a Wesleyan Methodist Chapel). The founder of Methodism, John Wesley, visited Camelford on several occasions during his journeys in Cornwall. In the 1830s and 1840s the Camelford Wesleyan Methodist circuit underwent a secession by more than half the members to the Wesleyan Methodist Association. There is an older Methodist chapel (now disused) in Chapel Street.

Soul's Harbour Pentecostal Church is situated on the Clease adjacent to the car park. It is affiliated with The Assemblies of God of Great Britain and was founded in 1987. The building the Church occupies was built as the Church School in 1846.

Sir James Smith's School provides secondary education to the town and surrounding area and there is also a primary school.

== Governance ==
There are two tiers of local government covering Camelford, at parish and unitary authority level: Camelford Town Council and Cornwall Council. The town council is based at Camelford Town Hall in the Market Place.

For national elections, Camelford forms part of the North Cornwall constituency.

=== Administrative history ===
The ancient parish covering Camelford was historically called Lanteglos, generally known as Lanteglos-by-Camelford to distinguish it from Lanteglos-by-Fowey. The parish formed part of the Lesnewth Hundred of Cornwall. As well as Lanteglos and Camelford, the parish also covered surrounding rural areas and several outlying hamlets, including Helstone, Tregoodwell, and Trewalder. The parish also had a detached part to the north, around Penpethy.

Camelford was made a borough in 1259, when it was granted a charter by Richard, Earl of Cornwall. A subsequent charter from Charles II in 1669 formally incorporated the borough, establishing a governing body led by a mayor. The borough boundary defined in the 1669 charter covered a relatively small area around the town as it then was.

The borough served as a constituency for parliamentary elections from 1547, as the Camelford parliamentary borough. The constituency came to be seen as a rotten borough, effectively being controlled by certain landowners. The constituency was abolished under the Reform Act 1832, when the area became part of the East Cornwall constituency.

A government survey of boroughs in 1835 found that the borough had very few functions left after the abolition of the constituency. It was therefore not reformed to be a new-style municipal borough being introduced under the Municipal Corporations Act 1835. Camelford's borough corporation continued to exist, but it was ineligible to take on any new local government functions. By the 1880s the corporation had stopped appointing its own constables and no longer ran the courts it was entitled to hold under its charter. The functions it continued to operate had largely reduced to running the fairs and managing certain properties it owned, including the Town Hall. Such unreformed boroughs were eventually abolished in 1886 under the Municipal Corporations Act 1883. Following the dissolution of the borough in 1886, the borough's property passed to a trust.

When elected parish and district councils were established under the Local Government Act 1894, Lanteglos was given a parish council and included in the Camelford Rural District.

In 1934, the detached part of the parish around Penpethy was transferred to the parish of Tintagel, and the remainder of the civil parish of Lanteglos was renamed Camelford. The ecclesiastical parish retains the name Lanteglos-by-Camelford.

Camelford Rural District was abolished in 1974 under the Local Government Act 1972, when the area became part of the new district of North Cornwall. As part of the 1974 reforms, parish councils were given the right to declare their parishes to be a town, allowing them to take the title of town council and giving the title of mayor to the council's chairperson. Camelford Parish Council exercised this right, becoming Camelford Town Council.

North Cornwall was abolished in 2009. Cornwall County Council then took on district-level functions, making it a unitary authority, and was renamed Cornwall Council.

== Cornish wrestling ==
Cornish wrestling tournaments, for prizes, were held in Camelford in the 1800s.

== Media ==
Local TV coverage is provided by BBC South West and ITV West Country. Television signals are received from the Caradon Hill TV transmitter. Local radio stations that broadcast to the town are BBC Radio Cornwall, Heart West, NCB Radio and Pirate FM. The town is served by the local newspaper, Cornish & Devon Post which publishes on Thursdays.

== Notable people associated with Camelford ==
- Samuel Wallis (1728–1795), a local Royal Navy officer and explorer, he went to Tahiti and circumnavigated the world.
- Thomas Pitt, 1st Baron Camelford (1737–1793), an art connoisseur and Thomas Pitt, 2nd Baron Camelford (1775–1804), a Royal Navy officer and explorer, were two members of the Pitt family, entitled Baron Camelford
- Francis Seymour-Conway, 3rd Marquess of Hertford (1777–1842), art collector and local MP, 1820 to 1822
- Samuel Cook (1806–1859), an English watercolour artist
- Francis Hurdon (1834–1914), an Ontario businessman and Canadian politician
- Samuel Pollard (1864–1915), a British Methodist missionary to China
- Tom Jago (1925–2018), a liquor executive and marketeer, created Baileys Irish Cream
- Jason Dawe (born 1967), journalist and TV presenter, formerly of Top Gear

== See also ==
- Camelford RFC, rugby union club
