= List of churches in Cornwall =

The following is a list of churches in Cornwall.

== Map of medieval parish churches ==
Medieval parish churches in Cornwall

== Active churches ==
The following civil parishes have no active churches: Paul, St Martin-by-Looe, St Stephens by Launceston Rural, and the unparished area of Wolf Rock.

The unitary authority has an estimated 627 churches for 553,700 people, a ratio of one church to every 883 people.

Name	Civil parish (settlement)	Web	Dedication	Founded	Denomination	Benefice	Notes
All Saints, Bryher	Bryher		All Saints	pre 1742	Church of England	Isles of Scilly	
St Nicholas, Tresco	Tresco		Nicholas	1877-1882	Church of England	Isles of Scilly	
St Martin, St Martin's	St Martin's		Martin of Tours	1683	Church of England	Isles of Scilly	
St Martin's Methodist Church	St Martin's				Methodist	Scilly Methodist Circuit	
St Mary, St Mary's	St Mary's		Mary	1836-1838	Church of England	Isles of Scilly	
St Mary, Star of the Sea, St Mary's	St Mary's		Mary		Roman Catholic	Holy Family Parish, Penzance	
St Mary's Methodist Church	St Mary's				Methodist	Scilly Methodist Circuit	
St Mary's Old Church, St Mary's	St Mary's (Old Town)		Mary	Medieval	Church of England	Isles of Scilly	
St Agnes, St Agnes	St Agnes, Isles of Scilly		Agnes of Rome	C16th/17th	Church of England	Isles of Scilly	
St Sennen, Sennen	Sennen		Senara	Medieval	Church of England	St Buryan, St Levan & Sennen	
Escalls Methodist Chapel	Sennen (Escalls)				Methodist	West Penwith Methodist Circuit	
St Levan, St Levan	St Levan		Selevan	Medieval	Church of England	St Buryan, St Levan & Sennen	
St Buryan, St Buryan	St Buryan		Buriana	Medieval	Church of England	St Buryan, St Levan & Sennen	
St Buryan Methodist Church	St Buryan				Methodist	West Penwith Methodist Circuit	
St Pol de Léon, Paul	Penzance (Paul)		Paul Aurelian	Medieval	Church of England	Penlee Cluster	Rebuilt 1600
Mousehole Methodist Chapel	Penzance (Mousehole)				Methodist	West Penwith Methodist Circuit	
St Peter, Newlyn	Penzance (Newlyn)		Peter	1866	Church of England	Penlee Cluster	
Trinity Methodist Church, Newlyn	Penzance (Newlyn)		Trinity		Methodist	West Penwith Methodist Circuit	
Centenary Methodist Chapel, Newlyn	Penzance (Newlyn)				Methodist	West Penwith Methodist Circuit	
St Mary the Virgin, Penzance	Penzance		Mary	Medieval	Church of England	Penlee Cluster	Rebuilt 1836. Chapel of ease to Madron till 1871
St John the Baptist, Penzance	Penzance		John the Baptist	1881	Church of England	Penlee Cluster	
Immaculate Conception, Penzance	Penzance		Immac. Conception	1843	Roman Catholic	Holy Family Parish, Penzance	
Penzance Baptist Church	Penzance				Ind.		
Chapel St. Methodist Church, Penzance	Penzance				Methodist	West Penwith Methodist Circuit	
High Street Methodist Church, Penzance	Penzance				Methodist	West Penwith Methodist Circuit	
Penzance Salvation Army	Penzance				Salvation Army		
Penzance Quaker Meeting	Penzance				Quakers		Meeting for worship at Penzance YMCA
Discovery Church Penzance	Penzance				Elim		Meets at Bolitho School
Hope Church Penzance and Newlyn	Penzance				Apostolic Church		
Shekinah Christian Church	Penzance		Shekhinah		Ground Level		
St Creden, Sancreed	Sancreed		Credan	Medieval	Church of England		
Drift Methodist Church	Sancreed (Drift)				Methodist	West Penwith Methodist Circuit	
St Just, St Just-in-Penwith	St Just		St Just (unknown)	Medieval	Church of England		
St Just Methodist Church	St Just				Methodist	West Penwith Methodist Circuit	
St Just Free Church	St Just				Wesleyan Reform		
St John the Baptist, Pendeen	St Just (Pendeen)		John the Baptist	1849	Church of England		
St Bridget, Morvah	Morvah		Brigid of Sweden	Medieval	Church of England		Also St Morwetha? Originally chapel to Madron
St Maddern, Madron	Madron		Madron	Medieval	Church of England	Madron & Gulval Churches	
Madron Methodist Church	Madron				Methodist	West Penwith Methodist Circuit	
St Gulval, Gulval	Penzance (Gulval)		Gulval	Medieval	Church of England	Madron & Gulval Churches	
Gulval Methodist Church	Penzance (Gulval)				Methodist	West Penwith Methodist Circuit	
St Thomas, Heamoor	Penzance (Heamoor)		Thomas	1892	Church of England	Madron & Gulval Churches	Originally a chapel of ease
Wesley Rock Methodist Church, Heamoor	Penzance (Heamoor)				Methodist	West Penwith Methodist Circuit	
St Senara, Zennor	Zennor		Senara	Medieval	Church of England	Zennor & Towednack	
St Tewennocus, Towednack	Towednack		Tewennocus	Medieval	Church of England	Zennor & Towednack	
St John's-in-the-Fields, Halsetown	St Ives (Halsetown)		John the Evangelist	1858	Church of England	St Ives	
Hellesveor Methodist Church	St Ives (Hellesveor)				Methodist	St Ives & Hayle Methodist Circuit	
St Ia, St Ives	St Ives		Ia the Virgin	Medieval	Church of England	St Ives	Chapel of ease to Lelant until 1826
Sacred Heart & St Ia, St Ives	St Ives		Sacred Heart & Ia		Roman Catholic	Holy Family Parish, Penzance	
Bible Christian Chapel, St Ives	St Ives				Methodist	St Ives & Hayle Methodist Circuit	
St Ives United Church	St Ives				Methodist	St Ives & Hayle Methodist Circuit	
Fore Street Methodist Church, St Ives	St Ives				Methodist		Uniquely not part of a circuit
Zion Community Church, St Ives	St Ives		Zion		EFCC / CHC		
St Ives Salvation Army	St Ives				Salvation Army		
The Vine Christian Fellowship, St Ives	St Ives			1998	Elim		
St Anta & All Saints, Carbis Bay	St Ives (Carbis Bay)			1913	Church of England	Carbis Bay & Lelant	Current building 1929
Wesley Methodist Church, Carbis Bay	St Ives (Carbis Bay)		John Wesley		Methodist	St Ives & Hayle Methodist Circuit	
Chy-an-Gweal Methodist Church	St Ives (Carbis Bay)				Methodist	St Ives & Hayle Methodist Circuit	
St Uny, Lelant	St Ives (Lelant)		Uny	Medieval	Church of England	Carbis Bay & Lelant	
SS Ludowanus & Paul, Ludgvan	Ludgvan		Ludowanus & Paul	Medieval	Church of England	Mount's Bay United Benefice	
Crowlas Methodist Church	Ludgvan (Crowlas)				Methodist	Lizard & Mount's Bay Circuit	
All Saints, Marazion	Marazion		All Saints	Medieval	Church of England	Mount's Bay United Benefice	Rebuilt 1861. Old church dedicated to St Hermes
Marazion Methodist Church	Marazion				Methodist	Lizard & Mount's Bay Circuit	
Marazion Quaker Meeting	Marazion				Quakers		
St John, St Michael's Mount	St Michael's Mount		John the Baptist	Medieval	Church of England		Extra-diocesan. Now serves Order of St John
St Hilary, St Hilary	St Hilary		Hilary of Poitiers	Medieval	Church of England	Mount's Bay United Benefice	
SS Michael & Piran, Perranuthnoe	Perranuthnoe		Michael & Piran	Medieval	Church of England	Mount's Bay United Benefice	
Goldsithney Methodist Church	Perranuthnoe (Goldsithney)				Methodist	Lizard & Mount's Bay Circuit	
St Erth, St Erth	St Erth		Erc of Slane	Medieval	Church of England	Godrevy Team Ministry	
St Erth Methodist Church	St Erth				Methodist	St Ives & Hayle Methodist Circuit	
St Elwyn, Hayle	Hayle		Elwen	1886-1888	Church of England	Godrevy Team Ministry	
St Joseph, Hayle	Hayle		Joseph		Roman Catholic	Holy Family Parish, Penzance	
Hayle Methodist Church	Hayle				Methodist	St Ives & Hayle Methodist Circuit	
Ventonleague Methodist Church	Hayle				Methodist	St Ives & Hayle Methodist Circuit	
Hayle Light & Life Church	Hayle				Free Methodist		Penzance L&L also meeting in Hayle at present
Hayle Salvation Army	Hayle				Salvation Army		
St John Mission Church, Copperhouse	Hayle (Copperhouse)		John?		Church of England		
SS Felicitas & Piala, Phillack	Hayle (Phillack)		Felec of C'wall, Piala	Medieval	Church of England	Godrevy Team Ministry	Rebuilt 1856–1857
St Gwinear, Gwinear	Gwinear–Gwithian (Gwinear)		Gwinear	Medieval	Church of England	Godrevy Team Ministry	
St Gothian, Gwithian	Gwinear–Gwithian (Gwithian)		Gothian	Medieval	Church of England	Godrevy Team Ministry	
Angarrack Methodist Church	Gwinear–Gwithian (Angarrack)				Methodist	St Ives & Hayle Methodist Circuit	
Wall Methodist Church	Gwinear–Gwithian (Wall)				Methodist	Camborne & Redruth Circuit	
St Germoe, Germoe	Germoe		Germocus	Medieval	Church of England	West Kerrier Benefice	
The Annunciation, Ashton	Breage (Ashton)		Annunciation	??	Church of England	West Kerrier Benefice	
St Breaca, Breage	Breage		Breage	Medieval	Church of England	West Kerrier Benefice	
Breaney Methodist Chapel	Breage			1833	Methodist	Lizard & Mount's Bay Circuit	
Carleen Community Church	Breage (Carleen)				Apostolic Church		
Kenneggy Methodist Church	Breage (Kenneggy)				Methodist	Lizard & Mount's Bay Circuit	
St Sithney, Sithney	Sithney		Sithney	Medieval	Church of England	West Kerrier Benefice	
St Bartholomew, Porthleven	Porthleven		Bartholomew	1842	Church of England	West Kerrier Benefice	
Porthleven Methodist Church	Porthleven				Methodist	Lizard & Mount's Bay Circuit	
Porthleven Community Church	Porthleven			1929	Apostolic Church		Name changed from P. Apostolic Church 2014
Balwest Methodist Church	Porthleven (Balwest)				Methodist	Lizard & Mount's Bay Circuit	
St Michael, Helston	Helston		Michael	Medieval	Church of England	Helston, Wendrona & Porkellis	Current building 1751–1761
St Mary, Helston	Helston		Mary		Roman Catholic	Parish of St Mary, Falmouth	
Central Methodist Church, Helston	Helston				Methodist	Lizard & Mount's Bay Circuit	
Helston Light & Life Church	Helston				Free Methodist		
Helston Baptist Church	Helston			1985	FIEC		
KingsGate Church, Helston	Helston				Ground Level		
Degibna Methodist Church	Helston (Degibna)				Methodist	Lizard & Mount's Bay Circuit	
St Wendrona, Wendron	Wendron		Wendrona	Medieval	Church of England	Helston, Wendrona & Porkellis	
Trinity Methodist Church, Porkellis	Wendron (Porkellis)		Trinity		Methodist	Lizard & Mount's Bay Circuit	
Edgcumbe Methodist Church	Wendron (Edgcumbe)				Methodist	Falmouth & Gwennap Circuit	
Penmarth Methodist Church	Wendron (Penmarth)				Methodist	Falmouth & Gwennap Circuit	
St Constantine, Constantine	Constantine		Constantine (British)	Medieval	Church of England	Constantine & Gweek	
Gweek Mission Church	Gweek				Church of England	Constantine & Gweek	
St Mawgan, Mawgan-in-Meneage	Mawgan in Meneage		Mauganus	Medieval	Church of England	Meneage Benefice	
St Martin, St Martin-in-Meneage	St Martin in Meneage		Martin of Tours	Medieval	Church of England	Meneage Benefice	Rebuilt 1830
SS Manaccus & Dunstan, Manaccan	Manaccan		Mannacus & Dunstan	Medieval	Church of England	Meneage Benefice	
Meneage Methodist Church	Manaccan				Methodist	Lizard & Mount's Bay Circuit	
St Anthony, St Anthony-in-Meneage	St Anthony in Meneage		Anthony?	Medieval	Church of England	Meneage Benefice	
St Keverne, St Keverne	St Keverne		Keverne	Medieval	Church of England	The Lizard Group	
United Methodist Church, St Keverne	St Keverne				Methodist	Lizard & Mount's Bay Circuit	
St Peter, Coverack	St Keverne (Coverack)		Peter	C19th	Church of England	The Lizard Group	
Ponsongath Methodist Church	St Keverne (Ponsongath)				Methodist	Lizard & Mount's Bay Circuit	
St Rumon, Ruan Minor	Grade–Ruan (Ruan Minor)		Rumon	Medieval	Church of England	The Lizard Group	
Ruan Minor Methodist Church	Grade–Ruan (Ruan Minor)				Methodist	Lizard & Mount's Bay Circuit	
St Mary, Cadgwith	Grade–Ruan (Cadgwith)		Mary	1895	Church of England	The Lizard Group	Previously a Catholic chapel
St Grada and Holy Cross, Grade	Grade–Ruan (Grade)		Grada & Cross	Medieval	Church of England	The Lizard Group	
St Wynwallow's Church, Landewednack	Landewednack		Winwaloe	Medieval	Church of England	The Lizard Group	
The Lizard Chapel	Landewednack (Lizard)				Methodist	Lizard & Mount's Bay Circuit	
St Mellanus Church, Mullion	Mullion		Melaine	Medieval	Church of England	Mullion, Cury & Gunwalloe	
St Michael the Archangel, Mullion	Mullion		Michael		Roman Catholic	Parish of St Mary, Falmouth	
Mullion Methodist Church	Mullion				Methodist	Lizard & Mount's Bay Circuit	
St Corentine’s Church, Cury	Cury		Corentin of Quimper	Medieval	Church of England	Mullion, Cury & Gunwalloe	
Cury Methodist Church	Cury				Methodist	Lizard & Mount's Bay Circuit	
St Winwaloe, Gunwalloe	Gunwalloe		Winwaloe	Medieval	Church of England	Mullion, Cury & Gunwalloe	
St Michael, Mawnan Smith	Mawnan (Mawnan Smith)		Michael	1876	Church of England		
St Edward the Confessor, Mawnan Smith	Mawnan (Mawnan Smith)		Edward the Confessor		Roman Catholic	Parish of St Mary, Falmouth	
Mawnan Smith Methodist Church	Mawnan (Mawnan Smith)			1815	Methodist	Falmouth & Gwennap Circuit	
SS Mawnan & Stephen, Mawnan	Mawnan		Maunanus & Stephen	Medieval	Church of England		
St Budock, Budock	Budock		Budoc	Medieval	Church of England		
All Saints' Church, Falmouth	Falmouth		All Saints	1876	Church of England		Current building 1887-1890
King Charles the Martyr, Falmouth	Falmouth		Charles I of England	1663-1665	Church of England		
The Holy Spirit, Laburnum Drive	Falmouth		Holy Spirit		Church of England	Holy Spirit & St Michael's	
St Michael & All Angels, Penwerris	Falmouth		Michael	1827-1828	Church of England	Holy Spirit & St Michael's	
St Mary Immaculate, Falmouth	Falmouth		Mary		Roman Catholic	Parish of St Mary, Falmouth	
Emmanuel Baptist Church, Falmouth	Falmouth		Jesus		Baptist Union		
Falmouth Methodist Church	Falmouth				Methodist	Falmouth & Gwennap Circuit	
Falmouth Light & Life Church	Falmouth				Free Methodist		
Falmouth URC with Trinity Baptist	Falmouth				Baptist / URC		
Falmouth New Life Church	Falmouth			1935	Assemblies of God		
The Harbour Church	Falmouth			2010	Elim		Previous Elim church of 1935 closed mid-1990s
Falmouth Quaker Meeting	Falmouth				Quakers		
Falmouth Salvation Army	Falmouth				Salvation Army		
St Gluvias, Penryn	Penryn		Gluvias of Cornwall	Medieval	Church of England		
Penryn Methodist Church	Penryn			1893	Methodist	Falmouth & Gwennap Circuit	
Highway Church, Penryn	Penryn				?		
Stirring of the Water Ministries	Penryn			1994	?		
St Peter, Flushing	Mylor (Flushing)		Peter	1842	Church of England	Mylor	Current building 1841
St Mylor Church	Mylor (Mylor Churchtown)		Melor	Medieval	Church of England	Mylor	
All Saints Mission Church, Mylor Bridge	Mylor (Mylor Bridge)		All Saints		Church of England	Mylor	
Mylor Methodist Church	Mylor			1792	Methodist	Falmouth & Gwennap Circuit	
St Laud, Mabe	Mabe		Laudus	Medieval	Church of England	Mabe & Ponsanooth	
St Michael & All Angels, Ponsanooth	St Gluvias (Ponsanooth)		Michael	???	Church of England	Mabe & Ponsanooth	
Ponsanooth Methodist Church	St Gluvias (Ponsanooth)				Methodist	Falmouth & Gwennap Circuit	
SS Michael the Archangel & Piran, Falmouth	St Gluvias (Laity Moor)		Michael & Piran		Greek Orthodox		Only Orthodox church in Cornwall
St Crewenna, Crowan	Crowan		Crewenna	Medieval	Church of England	Crowan & Treslothan	Defunct missions in Leedstown and Troon
Leedstown Methodist Church	Crowan (Leedstown)				Methodist	Lizard & Mount's Bay Circuit	
St John the Evangelist, Treslothan	Camborne (Treslothan)		John the Evangelist	1841-1842	Church of England	Crowan & Treslothan	
Troon Methodist Church	Camborne (Troon)				Methodist Church	Camborne & Redruth Circuit	
Holy Trinity, Penponds	Camborne (Penponds)		Trinity	1846	Church of England	Camborne, Tuckingmill, Penponds	
Barripper Methodist Church	Camborne (Barripper)				Methodist	Camborne & Redruth Circuit	
Kehelland Methodist Church	Camborne (Kehelland)				Methodist	Camborne & Redruth Circuit	
SS Martin & Meriadoc, Camborne	Camborne		Martin & Meriasek	Medieval	Church of England	Camborne, Tuckingmill, Penponds	
St John the Baptist, Camborne	Camborne		John the Baptist		Roman Catholic	Our Lady of All Nations Parish	
Camborne Wesley Methodist Church	Camborne		John Wesley		Methodist	Camborne & Redruth Circuit	
Centenary Methodist Church, Camborne	Camborne				Methodist	Camborne & Redruth Circuit	
Fore Street Chapel, Camborne	Camborne				Partnership UK		
Elim Church Camborne	Camborne				Elim		
The King's Arms Church	Camborne				?		
Beacon Methodist Church	Camborne (Beacon)				Methodist	Camborne & Redruth Circuit	
All Saints, Tuckingmill	Camborne (Tuckingmill)		All Saints	1845	Church of England	Camborne, Tuckingmill, Penponds	Mission at Brea built 1888
Tuckingmill Baptist Church	Camborne (Tuckingmill)				Ind.		
Carn Brea Village Methodist Church	Carn Brea				Methodist	Camborne & Redruth Circuit	
Trevenson Church, Pool	Carn Brea (Pool)			1809	Church of England	St. Illogan	
Pool Light & Life Church	Carn Brea (Pool)				Free Methodist		
Illogan Highway Methodist Church	Carn Brea (Illogan Highway)				Methodist	Camborne & Redruth Circuit	
Grapevine Community Church	Carn Brea (Illogan)			1995	?		
St Illogan, Illogan	Illogan		Illogan	Medieval	Church of England	St. Illogan	Rebuilt 1846
Redruth Seventh-Day Adventist Church	Illogan				7th-Day Adventist		
Paynter's Lane End Methodist Church	Illogan (Paynter's Lane End)				Methodist	Camborne & Redruth Circuit	
St Mary, Portreath	Portreath		Mary	1841	Church of England	St. Illogan	Rebuilt 1863
Bridge Methodist Church	Portreath (Bridge)			1816	Methodist	Camborne & Redruth Circuit	
St Euny, Redruth	Redruth		Euny	Medieval	Church of England	Redruth Team	
St Andrew, Redruth	Redruth		Andrew	1884	Church of England	Redruth Team	
The Assumption, Redruth	Redruth		Assumption of Mary		Roman Catholic	Our Lady of All Nations Parish	
Redruth Baptist Church	Redruth			1801	Ind.		
Redruth Methodist Church	Redruth				Methodist	Camborne & Redruth Circuit	
Redruth Salvation Army	Redruth				Salvation Army		
Bethel Community Church, Redruth	Redruth		Bethel		Assemblies of God		
The Engine House Church, Redruth	Redruth				Elim		
NCC Redruth	Redruth			2014	Elim		Plant from NCC Newquay
Emmanuel Full Gospel International Redruth	Carn Brea (Pool)				Emmanuel FGI		
St Andrew, Pencoys	Carn Brea (Four Lanes)		Andrew	1882	Church of England	Redruth Team	
Four Lanes Methodist Church	Carn Brea (Four Lanes)				Methodist	Camborne & Redruth Circuit	
Christ Church, Lanner	Lanner		Jesus	1845	Church of England	Redruth Team	
Lanner Methodist Church	Lanner				Methodist	Falmouth & Gwennap Circuit	
Carnkie Methodist Church	Lanner (Carnkie)				Methodist	Falmouth & Gwennap Circuit	
St Stephen, Treleigh	Redruth (Treleigh)		Stephen	1866	Church of England	Redruth Team	
Holy Trinity, St Day	St Day		Trinity	1828	Church of England	Eight Saints Cluster	Med. chapel. Old church ruined, new church 1956
St Day Methodist Church	St Day				Methodist	Falmouth & Gwennap Circuit	
Scorrier Christian Fellowship	St Day (Scorrier)				FIEC		
St Piran, Carharrack	Carharrack		Piran	C19th	Church of England	Eight Saints Cluster	
Carharrack Methodist Church	Carharrack				Methodist	Falmouth & Gwennap Circuit	
St Paul, Chacewater	Chacewater		Paul	1828	Church of England	Eight Saints Cluster	Rebuilt 1892
Chacewater Methodist Church	Chacewater				Methodist	Truro Methodist Circuit	Meets in the village hall; chapel closed 2002
Twelveheads Methodist Church	Chacewater (Twelveheads)				Methodist	Truro Methodist Circuit	
St Wenappa, Gwennap	Gwennap		Wenappa	Medieval	Church of England	Eight Saints Cluster	
Frogpool Methodist Church	Gwennap (Frogpool)				Methodist	Falmouth & Gwennap Circuit	
Hicks Mill Methodist Church	Gwennap (near Cusgarne)				Methodist	Truro Methodist Circuit	
St Stythians, Stithians	Stithians		Stithians	Medieval	Church of England	Eight Saints Cluster	
Stithians Methodist Church	Stithians				Methodist	Falmouth & Gwennap Circuit	
St Piran's Church, Perranarworthal	Perranarworthal		Piran	Medieval	Church of England	Eight Saints Cluster	Partnership with Perranwell Methodists
Perranwell Methodist Church	Perranarworthal (Perranwell)				Methodist	Falmouth & Gwennap Circuit	
SS John the Evangelist & Petroc, Devoran	Feock (Devoran)		John the Ev. & Petroc	1847	Church of England	Eight Saints Cluster	Current building 1855–1856
Devoran Methodist Church	Feock (Devoran)				Methodist	Truro Methodist Circuit	
Carnon Downs Methodist Church	Feock (Carnon Downs)				Methodist	Truro Methodist Circuit	
Penpoll Methodist Church	Feock (Chycoose)				Methodist	Truro Methodist Circuit	
St Feock, Feock	Feock		Feoca	Medieval	Church of England	Eight Saints Cluster	
Feock Methodist Church	Feock				Methodist	Truro Methodist Circuit	
St John the Baptist, Mount Hawke	St Agnes (Mount Hawke)		John the Baptist	1846	Church of England	Atlantic Coast Cluster	
Mount Hawke Methodist Church	St Agnes (Mount Hawke)				Methodist	Newquay, Perranporth, St Agnes Circ	
Porthtowan Methodist Church	St Agnes (Porthtowan)				Methodist	Camborne & Redruth Circuit	
Mawla Methodist Church	St Agnes (Mawla)				Methodist	Camborne & Redruth Circuit	
St Agnes, St Agnes	St Agnes		Agnes of Rome	Medieval	Church of England	Atlantic Coast Cluster	Chapel to Perranzabuloe until 1846. Rebuilt 1851
Our Lady, Star of the Sea, St Agnes	St Agnes		Mary		Roman Catholic	Newquay Catholic Parish	
St Agnes Methodist Church	St Agnes				Methodist	Newquay, Perranporth, St Agnes Circ	
St Piran, Perranzabuloe	Perranzabuloe		Piran	Medieval	Church of England	Atlantic Coast Cluster	Rebuilt 1804 because of encroaching sands
St Michael Mission Church, Perranporth	Perranzabuloe (Perranporth)		Michael	1872	Church of England	Atlantic Coast Cluster	
Christ the King, Perranporth	Perranzabuloe (Perranporth)		Jesus		Roman Catholic	Newquay Catholic Parish	
Perranporth Methodist Church	Perranzabuloe (Perranporth)				Methodist	Newquay, Perranporth, St Agnes Circ	
New Wave Church	Perranzabuloe (Perranporth)				Elim		
Rose Methodist Church	Perranzabuloe (Rose)				Methodist	Newquay, Perranporth, St Agnes Circ	
Church of St Cubert	Cubert		Cubert	Medieval	Church of England	Atlantic Coast Cluster	
Cubert Methodist Church	Cubert				Methodist	Newquay, Perranporth, St Agnes Circ	
St Carantoc's Church, Crantock	Crantock		Carantoc	Medieval	Church of England	Atlantic Coast Cluster	
Crantock Methodist Church	Crantock				Methodist	Newquay, Perranporth, St Agnes Circ	
All Hallows, St Kea	Kea		All Saints	1802	Church of England	St Kea	Rebuilt 1894–1896
Old Kea Church	Kea (Old Kea)			Medieval	Church of England	St Kea	
Friends Meeting House, Come-to-Good	Kea (Come-to-Good)			1710	Quakers		Most of Come-to-Good is in Feock parish
9.30 Truro	Truro				Church of England	St Kea	Meets in Penair School, Truro outskirts
St George the Martyr's Church, Truro	Truro		George	1849-1855	Church of England	Truro Benefice	
St John the Evangelist's Church, Truro	Truro		John the Evangelist	1828	Church of England	Truro Benefice	
Cathedral of the Blessed Virgin Mary	Truro		Mary	1880-1910	Church of England		On site of medieval parish church of St Mary
Our Lady of the Portal & St Piran, Truro	Truro		Mary & Piran	1884-1885	Roman Catholic	Truro Catholic Parish	Current building 1972–1973
Community of St Cuthbert, Truro	Truro		Cuthbert		ROCOR		Now worshiping at SS Michael the Archangel & Piran Greek Orthodox Church, Laity Moor
Truro Baptist Church	Truro				Baptist Union		
Truro Methodist Church	Truro				Methodist	Truro Methodist Circuit	
Light & Life Truro	Truro				Free Methodist		
Truro Salvation Army	Truro				Salvation Army		
Truro Quaker Meeting	Truro				Quakers		
Truro Evangelical Church	Truro			1998	FIEC		
Emmanuel Full Gospel International Truro	Truro				Emmanuel FGI		
Grace Church Truro	Truro			2010	Newfrontiers		
Truro Vineyard Church	Truro				Vineyard		
All Saints, Highertown	Truro (Highertown)		All Saints	1980	Church of England		
St Keyne, Kenwyn	Truro (Kenwyn)		Keyne	Medieval	Church of England	Kenwyn & St Allen	Rebuilt 1820. Missions in Idless & Shortlanesend
Allet Methodist Church	Kenwyn (Allet)				Methodist	Truro Methodist Circuit	
Shortlanesend Methodist Church	Kenwyn (Shortlanesend)				Methodist	Truro Methodist Circuit	
Threemilestone Methodist Church	Kenwyn (Threemilestone)				Methodist	Truro Methodist Circuit	
St Alleyne, St Allen	St Allen		Alleyne	Medieval	Church of England	Kenwyn & St Allen	Mission church in Zelah now closed
St Andrew, Malpas	St Clement (Malpas)		Andrew	???	Church of England	Malpas & St Clement	Church now closed, converted into a village hall.
St Clement, St Clement	St Clement		Pope Clement I	Medieval	Church of England	Malpas & St Clement	Mission church in Buckhead now closed
Tresillian Methodist Church	St Clement (Tresillian)				Methodist	Truro Methodist Circuit	
St Hermes, St Erme	St Erme		Erbin of Dumnonia	Medieval	Church of England	Probus Team	
Trispen Methodist Church	St Erme (Trispen)				Methodist	Truro Methodist Circuit	
St Ladoca, Ladock	Ladock		Ladoca	Medieval	Church of England	Probus Team	
Grampound Road Methodist Church	Ladock (Grampound Road)				Methodist	Truro Methodist Circuit	
SS Probus and Grace, Probus	Probus		Probus & Grace	Medieval	Church of England	Probus Team	
St Nun, Grampound	Grampound w Creed (Grampound)		Nun	Medieval	Church of England	Probus Team	Chapel to Creed. Disused 1815, rebuilt 1869
St Crida's Church, Creed	Grampound w Creed (Creed)		Crida	Medieval	Church of England	Probus Team	
Holy Trinity, Tresillian	St Michael Penkevil (Tresillian)		Trinity	1878	Church of England	Tresillian & Lamorran	Rebuilt 1904. Most of Tresillian in St Clement parish
St Moran, Lamorran	St Michael Penkevil (Lamorran)		Morenna	Medieval	Church of England	Tresillian & Lamorran	
St Michael, St Michael Penkevil	St Michael Penkevil		Michael	Medieval	Church of England		Rebuilt 1862–1866
St Cornelius, Cornelly	Tregony (Cornelly)		Cornelius	Medieval	Church of England	Cornelly & Tregony	
St Cuby, Tregony with Cuby	Cuby		Cybi	Medieval	Church of England	Cornelly & Tregony	Also church of Tregony since 1540. Rebuilt 1828
St Rumon, Ruanlanihorne	Ruan Lanihorne		Rumon	Medieval	Church of England	Ruanlanihorne, Veryan, Portloe	
St Symphorian, Veryan	Veryan		Symphorian	Medieval	Church of England	Ruanlanihorne, Veryan, Portloe	
All Saints United Church, Portloe	Veryan (Portloe)		All Saints	1896	Church of England	Ruanlanihorne, Veryan, Portloe	United church with Methodists 1992
St Philleigh, Philleigh	Philleigh		Filius	Medieval	Church of England	Philleigh & Gerrans	
Church of St Gerrans	Gerrans		Gerent	Medieval	Church of England	Philleigh & Gerrans	Originally chapel of St Anthony-in-Roseland
Portscatho United Church	Gerrans (Portscatho)				Methodist / URC	Truro Methodist Circuit	
St Just, St Just in Roseland	St Just in Roseland		Justus of Trieste	Medieval	Church of England	St Just & St Mawes	
St Mawes, St Mawes	St Just in Roseland (St Mawes)		Maudez	1884	Church of England	St Just & St Mawes	Earlier medieval chapel existed nearby
Our Lady Star of the Sea & St Anthony, St Mawes	St Just in Roseland (St Mawes)		Mary & Anthony		Roman Catholic	Truro Catholic Parish	
St Michael the Archangel, Newquay	Newquay		Michael	1858	Church of England	Newquay Churches	Current building 1911 replacing chapel of ease which was eventually demolished in the 1930s.
Most Holy Trinity, Newquay	Newquay		Trinity	1903	Roman Catholic	Newquay Catholic Parish	now the Golf Club
Newquay Reformed Baptist Church	Newquay			c.1822	Baptist	Methodist	Began as Ebenezer Baptist Chapel, rebuilt in c.1870
Newquay Methodist Church	Newquay			1904	Methodist	Newquay, Perranporth, St Agnes Circ	Elim Newquay Christian Centre
Newquay United Reformed Church	Newquay			1888	URC / FIEC		Began as Newquay Congregational
Newquay Salvation Army	Newquay			c.1833	Salvation Army	Methodist	Began as Crantock Street Methodist Chapel, the second such Methodist building in Newquay. The building was taken over by the Salvation Army in 1926.
Wave House Church, Newquay	Newquay			1948	Elim		
Blaze Church Newquay	Newquay				?		
St Columba, Columb Minor	Newquay (St Columb Minor)		Columba of Cornwall	Medieval	Church of England	Newquay Churches	
St Colanus, Colan	Colan		Collen	Medieval	Church of England	Newquay Churches	
St Newlina, St Newlyn East	St Newlyn East		Newlina	Medieval	Church of England		
St Newlyn East Methodist Church	St Newlyn East				Methodist	Newquay, Perranporth, St Agnes Circ	
St Enoder, St Enoder	St Enoder		Enoder	Medieval	Church of England	St Enoder & Indian Queens	
St Francis, Indian Queens	St Enoder (Indian Queens)		Francis of Assisi	???	Church of England	St Enoder & Indian Queens	
Indian Queens Methodist Church	St Enoder (Indian Queens)			1814	Methodist	St Austell Methodist Circuit	
St Constantine, Pedna Carne	St Enoder		Constantine (British)	???	Church of England	St Enoder & Indian Queens	
St Columba's Church, St Columb Major	St Columb Major		Columba of Cornwall	Medieval	Church of England	Lann Pydar Benefice	
SS Mawgan & Nicholas, St Mawgan	Mawgan in Pydar		Mauganus & Nicholas	Medieval	Church of England	Lann Pydar Benefice	
St Mawgan Methodist Church	Mawgan in Pydar				Methodist	Bodmin, Padstow, Wadebridge Circ	
St Eval, St Eval	St Eval		Uvelus	Medieval	Church of England	Lann Pydar Benefice	
St Ervan, St Ervan	St Ervan		Erbin of Dumnonia	Medieval	Church of England	Lann Pydar Benefice	Possibly dedicated to St Hermes
St Wenna, St Wenn	St Wenn		Wenna	Medieval	Church of England	St Wenn & Withiel	
Rosenannon Methodist Church	St Wenn (Rosenannon)				Methodist	Bodmin, Padstow, Wadebridge Circ	
Church of St Clement	Withiel		Pope Clement I	Medieval	Church of England	St Wenn & Withiel	
St Issey, St Issey	St Issey		Yse	Medieval	Church of England	Padstow etc.	
St Petroc Minor, Little Petherick	St Issey (Little Petherick)		Petroc	Medieval	Church of England	Padstow etc.	Rebuilt 1858
St Merryn, St Merryn	St Merryn		Merryn	Medieval	Church of England	Padstow etc.	
St Petroc, Padstow	Padstow		Petroc	Medieval	Church of England	Padstow etc.	Shares a building with the Catholic church
SS Saviour & Petroc, Padstow	Padstow		Jesus & Petroc	c. 1910	Roman Catholic	Parish of SS Mary & Petroc, Bodmin	Shares a building with the Anglican church
Padstow Methodist Church	Padstow				Methodist	Bodmin, Padstow, Wadebridge Circ	
St Saviour, Trevone	Padstow (Trevone)		Jesus	1928	Church of England	Padstow etc.	
St Michael, St Michael Caerhays	St Michael Caerhays		Michael	Medieval	Church of England	SS Goran & Michael	
St Goranus, Gorran Churchtown	St Goran (Gorran Churchtown)		Goronos	Medieval	Church of England	SS Goran & Michael	
St Just, Gorran Haven	St Goran (Gorran Haven)		St Just (?)	Medieval	Church of England	SS Goran & Michael	Medieval chapel of ease, used for worship again C19th
Haven Church	St Goran (Gorran Haven)			1860s	FIEC		Previously known as Mount Zion Church
St Peter, Mevagissey	Mevagissey		Peter	Medieval	Church of England	St Mewan, Mevagissey, St Ewe	
St Andrew's, Mevagissey	Mevagissey		Andrew		Methodist / URC	St Austell Methodist Circuit	
All Saints, St Ewe	St Ewe		All Saints	Medieval	Church of England	St Mewan, Mevagissey, St Ewe	
St Mark Mission Church, Sticker	St Mewan (Sticker)		Mark	1877	Church of England	St Mewan, Mevagissey, St Ewe	
Polgooth Methodist Church	St Mewan (Polgooth)				Methodist	St Austell Methodist Circuit	
St Mewan, St Mewan	St Mewan		Méen	Medieval	Church of England	St Mewan, Mevagissey, St Ewe	
Trinity Methodist Church, Trewoon	St Mewan (Trewoon)		Trinity		Methodist	St Austell Methodist Circuit	Merger of three Methodist churches
All Saints, Pentewan	Pentewan Valley (Pentewan)		All Saints	1821	Church of England	St Austell	
St Levan, Porthpean	St Austell Bay (Porthpean)		Levan	1884-1885	Church of England	St Austell	
Holy Trinity, St Austell	St Austell		Trinity	Medieval	Church of England	St Austell	
St Augustine of Hippo, St Austell	St Austell		Augustine of Hippo	1911	Roman Catholic	St Austell Catholic Parish	New church 1990
St Austell Baptist Church	St Austell				Baptist Union		
St John's Methodist Church, St Austell	St Austell		John (?)		Methodist	St Austell Methodist Circuit	
Mount Charles Methodist Church	St Austell				Methodist	St Austell Methodist Circuit	
St Austell Light & Life Church	St Austell				Free Methodist		
Seymour Gospel Hall	St Austell				Gospel Hall		
St Austell Salvation Army	St Austell				Salvation Army		
St Austell Quaker Meeting	St Austell				Quakers		
South Coast Church	St Austell				Ind.		
St Austell Seventh-Day Adventist Church	St Austell				7th-Day Adventist		
St Luke, Boscoppa	St Austell (Boscoppa)		Luke	1980	Church of England		Meets in Bishop Bronescombe School
Bethel Methodist Church, St Austell	St Austell (Boscoppa)		Bethel	1822	Methodist	St Austell Methodist Circuit	Current building 1836
St Stephen, St Stephen-in-Brannel	St Stephen-in-Brannel		Stephen	Medieval	Church of England	St Stephen & Nanpean	
Treviscoe Methodist Church	St Stephen-in-Brannel (Treviscoe)				Methodist	St Austell Methodist Circuit	
St George, Nanpean	St Stephen-in-Brannel (Nanpean)		George	1879	Church of England	St Stephen & Nanpean	
Nanpean Methodist Church	St Stephen-in-Brannel (Nanpean)			1873	Methodist	St Austell Methodist Circuit	Rebuilt 1990s
Mid Cornwall Christian Church	St Stephen-in-Brannel (Nanpean)				Assemblies of God		
Whitemoor Methodist Church	St Stephen-in-Brannel (Whitemoor)				Methodist	St Austell Methodist Circuit	
St Denys, St Dennis	St Dennis		Denis	Medieval	Church of England		
Carne Hill Methodist Church	St Dennis				Methodist	St Austell Methodist Circuit	Meets in St Dennis parish church
St Gomonda of the Rock, Roche	Roche		Gomondas	Medieval	Church of England		
Roche Methodist Church	Roche				Methodist	St Austell Methodist Circuit	
St Peter the Apostle, Treverbyn	Treverbyn		Peter	1848-1850	Church of England		Medieval chapel closed in Reformation times
Stenalees Methodist Church	Treverbyn (Stenalees)				Methodist	St Austell Methodist Circuit	
Bugle Methodist Church	Treverbyn (Bugle)				Methodist	St Austell Methodist Circuit	
Carclaze Methodist Church	Treverbyn (Carclaze)			1870	Methodist	St Austell Methodist Circuit	
SS Cyriacus & Julitta, Luxulyan	Luxulyan		Quriaqos & Julietta	Medieval	Church of England		
Gunwen Methodist Church	Luxulyan (Gunwen)			1869	Methodist	St Austell Methodist Circuit	
Innis Methodist Church	Luxulyan (Innis)			1820	Methodist	Bodmin, Padstow, Wadebridge Circ	
St Paul, Charlestown	St Austell Bay (Charlestown)		Paul	1849-1851	Church of England	Charlestown & Par	
Tregrehan Methodist Church	Carlyon (Tregrehan Mills)				Methodist	St Austell Methodist Circuit	
St Mary the Virgin, Par	St Blaise (Biscovey)		Mary	1849	Church of England	Charlestown & Par	
Leek Seed Methodist Church	St Blaise (Biscovey)				Methodist	St Austell Methodist Circuit	
The Good Shepherd, Par	Tywardreath and Par (Par)		Jesus	1896	Church of England	Charlestown & Par	
Par St Mary's Methodist Church	Tywardreath and Par (Par)				Methodist	St Austell Methodist Circuit	
St Blaise, St Blazey	St Blaise		Blaise	Medieval	Church of England		
St Andrew, Tywardreath	Tywardreath & Par (Tywardreath)		Andrew	Medieval	Church of England	Tywardreath & Polkerris	
Tywardreath Methodist Church	Tywardreath & Par (Tywardreath)				Methodist	St Austell Methodist Circuit	
Tregaminion Chapel of Ease, Polkerris	Fowey (Polkerris)			1813-1816	Church of England	Tywardreath & Polkerris	
St Sampson's Church, Golant	St Sampson (Golant)		Samson of Dol	Medieval	Church of England		
St Fimbarrus, Fowey	Fowey		Finbarr of Cork	Medieval	Church of England		Conservative evangelical
SS Cyricius & Julitta, St Veep	St Veep		Quriaqos & Julietta	Medieval	Church of England	Lostwithiel Parishes	
St Winnow's Church	St Winnow		Winnoc / Winwaloe (?)	Medieval	Church of England	Lostwithiel Parishes	
St Nectan's Chapel	St Winnow		Nectan of Hartland	Medieval	Church of England	Lostwithiel Parishes	Only five services a year
Boconnoc Parish Church	Boconnoc		Unknown	Medieval	Church of England	Lostwithiel Parishes	
St Mary the Virgin, Bradoc	Broadoak		Mary	Medieval	Church of England	Lostwithiel Parishes	
St Saviour, Bridgend	Lostwithiel (Bridgend)		Jesus	???	Church of England	Lostwithiel Parishes	May be defunct
St Bartholomew, Lostwithiel	Lostwithiel		Bartholomew	Medieval	Church of England	Lostwithiel Parishes	
Lostwithiel Methodist Church	Lostwithiel				Methodist	St Austell Methodist Circuit	
Lostwithiel Community Church	Lostwithiel				Elim		
St Brevita, Lanlivery	Lanlivery		Bryvyth	Medieval	Church of England	Lostwithiel Parishes	
St Hydroc, Lanhydrock	Lanhydrock		Hydroc	Medieval	Church of England	Bodmin Team	
Lanivet Parish Church	Lanivet		Unknown	Medieval	Church of England	Bodmin Team	
Lanivet Methodist Church	Lanivet				Methodist	Bodmin, Padstow, Wadebridge Circ	
St Petroc, Bodmin	Bodmin		Petroc	Medieval	Church of England	Bodmin Team	
SS Leonard & Lawrence, Bodmin	Bodmin		Leonard & Lawrence	1859-1861	Church of England		May be defunct
SS Mary & Petroc, Bodmin	Bodmin		Mary & Petroc	1881	Roman Catholic	Parish of SS Mary & Petroc, Bodmin	Current building 1965
Bodmin Methodist Church	Bodmin				Methodist	Bodmin, Padstow, Wadebridge Circ	
Bodmin Light & Life Church	Bodmin				Free Methodist		
Bodmin Community Church	Bodmin			2007	FIEC		Meets in Robartes Primary School
New Life Church, Bodmin	Bodmin				Assemblies of God		
Gateway 2 New Life Church, Bodmin	Bodmin			2014	Elim		
Bodmin Seventh-Day Adventist Church	Bodmin				7th-Day Adventist		
St Stephen, Nanstallon	Lanivet (Nanstallon)		Stephen	C19th/20th	Church of England	Bodmin Team	
Nanstallon Methodist Church	Lanivet (Nanstallon)			1889	Methodist	Bodmin, Padstow, Wadebridge Circ	
Church of St Meubred	Cardinham		Meubred	Medieval	Church of England	Bodmin Team	
Millpool Methodist Church	Cardinham (Millpool)				Methodist	Bodmin, Padstow, Wadebridge Circ	
St Conan, Egloshayle	Egloshayle (Washaway)		Conan of Cornwall (?)	1883	Church of England	Wadebridge Parish	
St Petroc, Egloshayle	Wadebridge (Egloshayle)		Petroc	Medieval	Church of England	Wadebridge Parish	
St Mary, Wadebridge	Wadebridge		Mary	???	Church of England	Wadebridge Parish	Meets in Betjeman community centre
St Michael, Wadebridge	Wadebridge		Michael		Roman Catholic	Parish of SS Mary & Petroc, Bodmin	
Cornerstone - Wadebridge Methodist Ch.	Wadebridge				Methodist	Bodmin, Padstow, Wadebridge Circ	
Wadebridge Quaker Meeting	Wadebridge				Quakers		
Wadebridge Christian Centre	Wadebridge				Assemblies of God		
St Breoke, St Breock	St Breock		Brioc	Medieval	Church of England	Wadebridge Parish	
St Michael, Rock	St Minver Lowlands (Rock)		Michael	Medieval	Church of England	North Cornwall Cluster	Chapel of ease to St Minver
Rock Methodist Church	St Minver Lowlands (Rock)				Methodist	Bodmin, Padstow, Wadebridge Circ	Also holds services in St Kew Highway
St Enodoc, Trebetherick	St Minver Lowlands (Trebetherick)		Enodoch	Medieval	Church of England	North Cornwall Cluster	Chapel of ease to St Minver
St Menefreda, St Minver	St Minver Highlands (St Minver)		Menefrida	Medieval	Church of England	North Cornwall Cluster	
Tubestation	St Minver Highlands (Polzeath)				Methodist		
St Endelienta, St Endellion	St Endellion		Endelienta	Medieval	Church of England	North Cornwall Cluster	
St Peter, Port Isaac	St Endellion (Port Isaac)		Peter	1882-1884	Church of England	North Cornwall Cluster	
Trelights Methodist Church	St Endellion (Trelights)				Methodist	Bodmin, Padstow, Wadebridge Circ	
St James the Great, St Kew	St Kew		James	Medieval	Church of England	North Cornwall Cluster	
St Mabena, St Mabyn	St Mabyn		Mabyn	Medieval	Church of England	St Mabyn, Michaelstow, Tudy	
St Tudy, St Tudy	St Tudy		Tudy of Landevennec	Medieval	Church of England	St Mabyn, Michaelstow, Tudy	
St Tudy Methodist Church	St Tudy				Methodist	Camelford & Week St Mary Circuit	
St Michael, Michaelstow	Michaelstow		Michael	Medieval	Church of England	St Mabyn, Michaelstow, Tudy	
Treveighan Methodist Church	Michaelstow (Treveighan)				Methodist	Camelford & Week St Mary Circuit	
St Helena, Helland	Helland		Helena	Medieval	Church of England	Helland, Blisland, St Breward	
SS Protus & Hyacinth, Blisland	Blisland		Hyacinth & Protus	Medieval	Church of England	Helland, Blisland, St Breward	
St Catherine, Temple	Blisland (Temple)		Catherine of Alexandria	Medieval	Church of England	Helland, Blisland, St Breward	Fell out of use between 1750 and 1850
St Breward, St Breward	St Breward		Branwalator	Medieval	Church of England	Helland, Blisland, St Breward	
St Breward Methodist Church	St Breward				Methodist	Camelford & Week St Mary Circuit	
St Tetha, St Teath	St Teath		Tetha	Medieval	Church of England	St Teath	
St Teath Methodist Church	St Teath				Methodist	Camelford & Week St Mary Circuit	
St John the Evangelist, Delabole	St Teath (Delabole)		John the Evangelist	1868	Church of England	St Teath	
Delabole Methodist Church	St Teath (Delabole)				Methodist	Camelford & Week St Mary Circuit	
St Julitta, Lanteglos	Camelford (Lanteglos)		Julitta	Medieval	Church of England	Lanteglos by Camelford w Advent	
St Thomas of Canterbury, Camelford	Camelford		Thomas Becket	1938	Church of England	Lanteglos by Camelford w Advent	
Camelford Methodist Church	Camelford				Methodist	Camelford & Week St Mary Circuit	
Soul's Harbour Church, Camelford	Camelford			1987	Assemblies of God		
Celebration Church Camelford	Camelford				?		Listed by Evangelical Alliance
St Adwena, Advent	Advent		Adwen	Medieval	Church of England	Lanteglos by Camelford w Advent	
Church of St Wyllow	Lanteglos-by-Fowey		Wyllow	Medieval	Church of England	Lanteglos-by-Fowey	
St John, Bodinnick	Lanteglos-by-F (Bodinnick)		John?	???	Church of England	Lanteglos-by-Fowey	May be defunct
St Saviour, Polruan	Lanteglos-by-Fowey (Polruan)		Jesus	1891	Church of England	Lanteglos-by-Fowey	Chapel of ease
St Ildierna, Lansallos	Lansallos		Ildierna	Medieval	Church of England		
St Tallanus, Talland	Lansallos (Talland)		Tallan	Medieval	Church of England	Talland, Pelynt & Lanreath	
St John the Baptist Mission, Polperro	Lansallos (Polperro)		John the Baptist	1838	Church of England	Talland, Pelynt & Lanreath	
Polperro Methodist Church	Lansallos (Polperro)				Methodist	Liskeard & Looe Circuit	
St Nun, Pelynt	Pelynt		Non	Medieval	Church of England	Talland, Pelynt & Lanreath	
Pelynt Methodist Church	Pelynt				Methodist	Liskeard & Looe Circuit	
St Marnarch, Lanreath	Lanreath		Marnarck	Medieval	Church of England	Talland, Pelynt & Lanreath	
Our Lady of Light, Sclerder Abbey	Looe		Mary	1843	Roman Catholic	Saltash Parish	
Riverside United Church	Looe				Methodist / URC		Methodist and URC churches united 1966
St Nicholas, West Looe	Looe (West Looe)		Nicholas	Medieval	Church of England	Looe Churches	Chapel of ease to St Martin; church again C19th
St Martin, St Martin-by-Looe	St Martin, Looe (St Martin-by-Looe)		Martin of Tours	Medieval	Church of England	Looe Churches	
St Wenna, Morval	Morval		Wenna	Medieval	Church of England	Looe Churches	
Grace Community Church, Morval	Morval				FIEC		
SS Cuby & Leonard, Duloe	Duloe		Cybi & Leonard	Medieval	Church of England	Duloe, Herodsfoot	
All Saints, Herodsfoot	Duloe (Herodsfoot)		All Saints	1850	Church of England	Duloe, Herodsfoot	
Trevelmond Methodist Church	St Pinnock (Trevelmond)				Methodist	Liskeard & Looe Circuit	
Connon Methodist Chapel	St Pinnock (Connon)				Methodist	Liskeard & Looe Circuit	
St Keyna, St Keyne	St Keyne		Keyne	Medieval	Church of England	Liskeard & St Keyne	
St Martin, Liskeard	Liskeard		Martin of Tours	Medieval	Church of England	Liskeard & St Keyne	
Our Lady & St Neot, Liskeard	Liskeard		Mary & Neot	1830	Roman Catholic	Saltash Parish	Current building 1863
Liskeard Baptist Church	Liskeard				Ind.		
Liskeard Wesley Methodist Church	Liskeard				Methodist	Liskeard & Looe Circuit	
Liskeard Light & Life Church	Liskeard				Free Methodist		
Liskeard Salvation Army	Liskeard			1887	Salvation Army		
Liskeard Quaker Meeting	Liskeard				Quakers		
Greenbank Community Church, Liskeard	Liskeard				Assemblies of God		
Garden Vineyard Church	Liskeard				Vineyard		
The Ark Mission	Liskeard			1996	Ind.		
Liskeard Seventh-Day Adventist	Liskeard				7th-Day Adventist		
St Peter, Dobwalls	Dobwalls & Trewidland (Dobwalls)		Peter	1839	Church of England		
Dobwalls United Church	Dobwalls & Trewidland (Dobwalls)				Methodist	Liskeard & Looe Circuit	
SS Lalluwy & Antoninus, Menheniot	Menheniot		Lalluwy & Antoninus	Medieval	Church of England	Menheniot	
Menheniot Methodist Church	Menheniot				Methodist	Liskeard & Looe Circuit	
St Mary, Merrymeet	Menheniot (Merrymeet)		Mary	1905	Church of England	Menheniot	
St Hugh, Quethiock	Quethiock		Hugh of Lincoln	Medieval	Church of England	St Ive, Pensilva, Quethiock	
Blunts Methodist Church	Quethiock (Blunts)				Methodist	Saltash Methodist Circuit	
St Ive, St Ive	St Ive		Ia of Cornwall	Medieval	Church of England	St Ive, Pensilva, Quethiock	
St Ive Methodist Church	St Ive				Methodist	Saltash Methodist Circuit	
St John, Pensilva	St Ive (Pensilva)		John?	1900	Church of England	St Ive, Pensilva, Quethiock	
Pensilva Methodist Church	St Ive (Pensilva)				Methodist	Liskeard & Looe Circuit	
St Clarus, St Cleer	St Cleer		Clarus	Medieval	Church of England		
Cleerway Community Church	St Cleer			2009	?		
St Neot, St Neot	St Neot		Neot	Medieval	Church of England		Closed mission church at Ley
St Neot Methodist Church	St Neot				Methodist	Liskeard & Looe Circuit	
St Bartholomew, Warleggan	Warleggan		Bartholomew	Medieval	Church of England		
Mount Methodist Church	Warleggan (Mount)				Methodist	Liskeard & Looe Circuit	
St Paul, Upton Cross	Linkinhorne (Upton Cross)		Paul	1886	Church of England	Callington Cluster	
St Melor, Linkinhorne	Linkinhorne		Melor	Medieval	Church of England	Callington Cluster	
St Sampson's Church, South Hill	South Hill		Samson of Dol	Medieval	Church of England	Callington Cluster	
Stoke Climsland Parish Church	Stokeclimsland		Unknown	Medieval	Church of England	Callington Cluster	
Stoke Climsland Methodist Church	Stokeclimsland				Methodist	Callington & Gunnislake Circuit	
St Mary's Church, Callington	Callington		Mary	Medieval	Church of England	Callington Cluster	
Our Lady of Victories, Callington	Callington		Mary	1931	Roman Catholic	St Cuthbert Mayne Parish	Current building 1954
Callington Methodist Church	Callington				Methodist	Callington & Gunnislake Circuit	
All Saints, Harrowbarrow	Calstock (Harrowbarrow)		All Saints	1871	Church of England	The Tamar Seven	
St Anne, Gunnislake	Calstock (Gunnislake)		Anne	1880	Church of England	The Tamar Seven	
Tamar Valley Methodist Church	Calstock (Drakewalls)				Methodist	Callington & Gunnislake Circuit	Merger of 5 Methodist churches
St Andrew, Calstock	Calstock		Andrew	Medieval	Church of England	The Tamar Seven	
St Dominica, St Dominick	St Dominick		Dominica	Medieval	Church of England	The Tamar Seven	
St Dominick Methodist Church	St Dominick				Methodist	Callington & Gunnislake Circuit	
St Indract's Chapel, Halton Quay	St Dominick (Halton Quay)		Indract of Glastonbury	???	Church of England		Smallest Anglican chapel in England
St Melanus, St Mellion	St Mellion		Melaine	Medieval	Church of England	The Tamar Seven	
Bealbury Methodist Church	St Mellion (Bealbury)				Methodist	Saltash Methodist Circuit	
St Odulph, Pillaton	Pillaton		Odulph	Medieval	Church of England	The Tamar Seven	
Church of St Leonard and St Dilpe	Landulph		Leonard & Dilpe	Medieval	Church of England	The Tamar Seven	
Landulph Methodist Church	Landulph				Methodist	Saltash Methodist Circuit	
St Mary, Botus Fleming	Botusfleming		Mary	Medieval	Church of England	Saltash Team	
St Michael's Church	Landrake with St Erney (Landrake)		Michael	Medieval	Church of England	Saltash Team	
Landrake Methodist Church	Landrake with St Erney (Landrake)				Methodist	Saltash Methodist Circuit	
St Erney, St Erney	Landrake with St Erney (St Erney)		Terninus	Medieval	Church of England	Saltash Team	
SS Nicholas & Faith, Saltash	Saltash		Nicholas & Faith	Medieval	Church of England	Saltash Team	Chapel of ease for 700 years until 1881
St Stephen, St Stephen-by-Saltash	Saltash		Stephen	Medieval	Church of England	Saltash Team	
Our Lady of the Angels, Saltash	Saltash		Mary		Roman Catholic	Saltash Parish	
Saltash Baptist Church	Saltash				Baptist Union		
Saltash Wesley Methodist Church	Saltash				Methodist	Saltash Methodist Circuit	
Engage Saltash	Saltash			2015	Assemblies of God		
Burraton Methodist Church	Saltash (Burraton)				Methodist	Saltash Methodist Circuit	
St Luke, Tideford	St Germans (Tideford)		Luke	1845	Church of England	St Germans Parishes	
St Germanus of Auxerre, St Germans	St Germans		Germain of Auxerre	Ancient	Church of England	St Germans Parishes	Seat of the Bishop of Cornwall until 1050
St Germans Methodist Church	St Germans				Methodist	Saltash Methodist Circuit	
St Anne, Hessenford	Deviock (Hessenford)		Anne	1832-1833	Church of England	St Germans Parishes	Rebuilt 1871
St Nicolas, Downderry	Deviock (Downderry)		Nicholas	1883-1884	Church of England	St Germans Parishes	Rebuilt 1905
Downderry Methodist Church	Deviock (Downderry)				Methodist	Saltash Methodist Circuit	
Blessed Virgin Mary, Sheviock	Sheviock		Mary	Medieval	Church of England	Antony, Sheviock, Torpoint	
Crafthole Methodist Church	Sheviock (Crafthole)				Methodist	Saltash Methodist Circuit	
St James the Great, Antony	Antony		James	Medieval	Church of England	Antony, Sheviock, Torpoint	
SS Philip & James, Maryfield	Antony (Maryfield)		Philip & James Less	1865-1866	Church of England	Antony, Sheviock, Torpoint	Previously a chapelry
St James, Torpoint	Torpoint		James	1816	Church of England	Antony, Sheviock, Torpoint	
St Joan of Arc, Torpoint	Torpoint		Joan of Arc		Roman Catholic	Saltash Parish	
Cornerstone Church, Torpoint	Torpoint				Methodist / URC	Plymouth & Devonport Circuit	Methodist and URC churches joined 1987
Grace Community Church, Torpoint	Torpoint			2006	FIEC		
St John the Baptist, St John	St John		John the Baptist	Medieval	Church of England	St John with Millbrook	
All Saints, Millbrook	Millbrook		All Saints	1827	Church of England	St John with Millbrook	Initially chapel of ease; rebuilt 1893–95 as church
Millbrook Methodist Church	Millbrook				Methodist	Plymouth & Devonport Circuit	
SS Mary & Julian, Maker	Maker-with-Rame (Maker)		Mary & Julian	Medieval	Church of England	Maker with Rame	
St Andrew's Mission Church, Cawsand	Maker-with-Rame (Cawsand)		Andrew	1878	Church of England	Maker with Rame	
Cawsand Congregational Church	Maker-with-Rame (Cawsand)				Cong Federation		
St Germanus, Rame	Maker-with-Rame (Rame)		Germain of Auxerre	Medieval	Church of England	Maker with Rame	
St David, Davidstow	Davidstow		David of Wales	Medieval	Church of England	Cornish Moorland Churches	
Tremail Methodist Church	Davidstow (Tremail)				Methodist	Camelford & Week St Mary Circuit	
St Clederus, St Clether	St Clether		Clederus	Medieval	Church of England	Cornish Moorland Churches	Rebuilt 1865
SS Sidwell & Gulvat, Laneast	Laneast		Sidwell & Gulvat	Medieval	Church of England	Cornish Moorland Churches	
St Nonna, Altarnon with Bolventor	Altarnun		Non	Medieval	Church of England	Cornish Moorland Churches	
St Michael & All Angels, Trewen	Trewen		Michael & Angels	Medieval	Church of England	Egloskerry etc.	
Pipers Pool Methodist Church	Trewen (Piper's Pool)				Methodist	Launceston Area Circuit	
SS Petrock & Keri, Egloskerry	Egloskerry		Petroc & Keria	Medieval	Church of England	Egloskerry etc.	Originally dedicated to SS Ide and Lydy
St Nicholas, Tresmere	Tresmeer		Nicholas	Medieval	Church of England	Egloskerry etc.	
Rehoboth Methodist Church	Tresmeer		Rehoboth		Methodist	Camelford & Week St Mary Circuit	
St Winwalo, Tremaine	Tremaine		Winwaloe	Medieval	Church of England	Egloskerry etc.	
St Paternus, North Petherwin	North Petherwin		Padarn	Medieval	Church of England	Egloskerry etc.	In Devon until 1966
Maxworthy Methodist Church	North Petherwin (Maxworthy)				Methodist	Camelford & Week St Mary Circuit	
St Denis, North Tamerton	North Tamerton		Denis	Medieval	Church of England	Boyton group	Benefice includes two churches in Devon
North Tamerton Methodist Church	North Tamerton				Methodist	Bude & Holsworthy Circuit	
Holy Name, Boyton	Boyton		Name of God	Medieval	Church of England	Boyton group	Benefice includes two churches in Devon
Boyton Methodist Church	Boyton				Methodist	Launceston Area Circuit	
St Martin of Tours, Werrington	Werrington		Martin of Tours	Medieval	Church of England	Boyton group	Rebuilt 1742. In Devon until 1966
Yeolmbridge Methodist Church	Werrington (Yeolmbridge)				Methodist	Launceston Area Circuit	
St Stephen the Martyr, Launceston	Launceston		Stephen	Medieval	Church of England	Launceston Parish Churches	
St Thomas the Apostle, Launceston	Launceston		Thomas	Medieval	Church of England	Launceston Parish Churches	
St Mary Magdalene, Launceston	Launceston		Mary Magdalene	Medieval	Church of England	Launceston Parish Churches	Current building 1511–1524
St Cuthbert Mayne, Launceston	Launceston		Cuthbert Mayne	1886	Roman Catholic	St Cuthbert Mayne Parish	Current building 1911
Launceston Central Methodist Church	Launceston				Methodist	Launceston Area Circuit	Circuit also includes churches in Devon
Launceston Salvation Army	Launceston				Salvation Army		
Launceston Community Church	Launceston				Assemblies of God		
Gateway 2 New Life Church, Launceston	Launceston			2010	Elim		
Christ the Cornerstone, Tregadillett	St Thomas the Apostle Rural		Jesus	1875	CoE / Methodist	Launceston Area Circuit	LEP with Methodist church. St Mary's CoE 1875
St Martin, Lewannick	Lewannick		Martin of Tours	Medieval	Church of England	Three Rivers	
Lewannick Methodist Church	Lewannick				Methodist	Launceston Area Circuit	Services held in St Martin's Anglican church
Polyphant Methodist Church	Lewannick (Polyphant)				Methodist	Launceston Area Circuit	
St Torney, North Hill	North Hill		Torney	Medieval	Church of England	Three Rivers	
Coads Green Methodist Church	North Hill (Coad's Green)				Methodist	Launceston Area Circuit	
St Paternus, South Petherwin	South Petherwin		Padarn	Medieval	Church of England	Three Rivers	
South Petherwin Methodist Church	South Petherwin				Methodist	Launceston Area Circuit	
St Michael, Lawhitton	Lawhitton		Michael	Medieval	Church of England	Three Rivers	
St Briochus, Lezant	Lezant		Briochus	Medieval	Church of England	Three Rivers	
Trebullett Methodist Church	Lezant (Trebullett)				Methodist	Launceston Area Circuit	
Holy Family Mission Church, Treknow	Tintagel (Treknow)		Holy Family	1929	Church of England		
St Materiana, Tintagel	Tintagel		Materiana	Medieval	Church of England	Boscastle & Tintagel Group	
St Paul the Apostle, Tintagel	Tintagel		Paul	1967-1968	Roman Catholic	Parish of SS Mary & Petroc, Bodmin	
Tintagel Methodist Church	Tintagel				Methodist	Camelford & Week St Mary Circuit	
Bossiney Methodist Church	Tintagel (Bossiney)				Methodist	Camelford & Week St Mary Circuit	
St Piran, Trethevy	Tintagel (Trethevy)		Piran	Medieval	Church of England	Boscastle & Tintagel Group	Chapel of ease
St Petroc, Trevalga	Trevalga		Petroc	Medieval	Church of England	Boscastle & Tintagel Group	
St Symphorian, Forrabury	Forrabury and Minster		Symphorian	Medieval	Church of England	Boscastle & Tintagel Group	
Boscastle Methodist Church	Forrabury & Minster (Boscastle)				Methodist	Camelford & Week St Mary Circuit	
St Merteriana, Minster	Forrabury and Minster		Materiana	Medieval	Church of England	Boscastle & Tintagel Group	
St Julitta, St Juliot	St Juliot		Julitta	Medieval	Church of England	Boscastle & Tintagel Group	
Tresparrett Methodist Church	St Juliot (Tresparrett)				Methodist	Camelford & Week St Mary Circuit	
St Michael & All Angels, Lesnewth	Lesnewth		Michael	Medieval	Church of England	Boscastle & Tintagel Group	
St Denis, Otterham	Otterham		Denis	Medieval	Church of England	Boscastle & Tintagel Group	
St Gregory the Great, Treneglos	Treneglos		Pope Gregory I	Medieval	Church of England	Week St Mary Circle	
St Werburgh, Warbstow	Warbstow		Werburgh	Medieval	Church of England	Week St Mary Circle	
Bethel Methodist Church	Warbstow (Trelash)		Bethel		Methodist	Camelford & Week St Mary Circuit	
Canworthy Water Methodist Church	Warbstow (Canworthy Water)				Methodist	Camelford & Week St Mary Circuit	
St James, Jacobstow	Jacobstow		James	Medieval	Church of England	Week St Mary Circle	
Eden Methodist Church	Jacobstow				Methodist	Camelford & Week St Mary Circuit	
St Gennys, St Gennys	St Gennys		Genesius of Arles	Medieval	Church of England	Week St Mary Circle	
Brockhill Methodist Church	St Gennys (Crackington Haven)				Methodist	Camelford & Week St Mary Circuit	
St Winwaloe, Poundstock	Poundstock		Winwaloe	Medieval	Church of England	Week St Mary Circle	
Poundstock Methodist Church	Poundstock				Methodist	Bude & Holsworthy Circuit	
Dimma Methodist Church	Poundstock (Trewint)				Methodist	Camelford & Week St Mary Circuit	
St Mary the Virgin, Week St Mary	Week St Mary		Mary	Medieval	Church of England	Week St Mary Circle	
Week St Mary Methodist Church	Week St Mary				Methodist	Camelford & Week St Mary Circuit	
St Anne, Whitstone	Whitstone		Anne	Medieval	Church of England	Week St Mary Circle	
Whitstone Methodist Church	Whitstone				Methodist	Bude & Holsworthy Circuit	
Our Lady & St Anne, Widemouth Bay	Poundstock (Widemouth Bay)		Mary & Anne	1929	Church of England	Week St Mary Circle	
St Marwenne, Marhamchurch	Marhamchurch		Morwenna	Medieval	Church of England	North Kernow	
Marhamchurch Methodist Church	Marhamchurch				Methodist	Bude & Holsworthy Circuit	
St Michael & All Angels, Bude Haven	Bude-Stratton (Bude)		Michael	1834	Church of England	North Kernow	
St Peter, Bude	Bude-Stratton (Bude)		Peter		Roman Catholic	St Cuthbert Mayne Parish	
Bude Methodist Church	Bude-Stratton (Bude)				Methodist	Bude & Holsworthy Circuit	Circuit also includes many churches in Devon
St Martin's URC, Bude	Bude-Stratton (Bude)		Martin of Tours		United Reformed		
Bude Quaker Meeting	Bude-Stratton (Bude)				Quakers		
Oceans Community Church	Bude-Stratton (Bude)				Elim		Prev. Bude Chr. Fellowship. Joined Elim c2005
St Andrew, Stratton	Bude-Stratton (Stratton)		Andrew	Medieval	Church of England	North Kernow	
Stratton Methodist Church	Bude-Stratton (Stratton)				Methodist	Bude & Holsworthy Circuit	
St Olaf, King & Martyr, Poughill	Bude-Stratton (Poughill)		Olaf II of Norway	Medieval	Church of England		Conservative evangelical
Poughill Methodist Church	Bude-Stratton (Poughill)				Methodist	Bude & Holsworthy Circuit	
St Swithin's Church, Launcells	Launcells		Swithun	Medieval	Church of England	North Kernow	
Launcells Methodist Church	Launcells				Methodist	Bude & Holsworthy Circuit	
St James Church, Kilkhampton	Kilkhampton		James	Medieval	Church of England	Kilkhampton & Morwenstow	
Kilkhampton Methodist Church	Kilkhampton				Methodist	Bude & Holsworthy Circuit	
SS Morwenna & John the Baptist, Morwenstow	Morwenstow		Morwenna, John Bap	Medieval	Church of England	Kilkhampton & Morwenstow	
Morwenstow Methodist Church	Morwenstow				Methodist	Bude & Holsworthy Circuit	
Woodford Methodist Church	Morwenstow (Woodford)				Methodist	Bude & Holsworthy Circuit	

=== Defunct churches ===
Name	Civil parish (settlement)	Dedication	Founded	Redundant	Denomination	Notes
St Paul, Penzance	Penzance	Paul	1843	1999	Church of England	Parish church 1869
St John the Baptist, Godolphin	Breage (Godolphin Cross)	John the Baptist	1849-1850	2006	Church of England	
St Christopher, Porkellis	Wendron (Porkellis)	Christopher	C19th	1970s	Church of England	Chapel of ease to Carnmenellis. Now village hall
Holy Trinity, Carnmenellis	Wendron (Penmarth)	Trinity	1850	1970	Church of England	
St Paul Mission Church, Helford	Manaccan (Helford)	Paul			Church of England	
St Rumon, Ruan Major	Grade–Ruan (Ruan Minor)	Rumon	Medieval		Church of England	Rebuilt 1866. Now a ruin
St Paul, Truro	Truro	Paul	1865	2007	Church of England	
Grampound Road Mission Church	Ladock (Grampound Road)				Church of England	
St Anthony, Merther	St Michael Penkevil (Merther)	Anthony	Medieval	mid C20th	Church of England	Chapelry to Probus until C19th. Now ruined
St James, Tregony	Tregony	James	Medieval	1540	Church of England	Destroyed by river
St Anthony, St Anthony in Roseland	Gerrans (St Anthony in Roseland)	Antoninus of Florence	Medieval		Church of England	Churches Conservation Trust
St Mary, East Looe	Looe (East Looe)	Mary	Medieval		Church of England	Rebuilt 1805, 1882–1883
St Pinnock, St Pinnock	St Pinnock	Pynnochus	Medieval		Church of England	
Holy Trinity, Bolventor	Altarnun (Bolventor)	Trinity	1848	1981	Church of England	
St Paul's Church	Kingsand	Paul	1882	1952	Church of England	
