= Our Lady and St Anne's Church, Widemouth Bay =

Anglican church in Cornwall, England

Our Lady & St Anne's
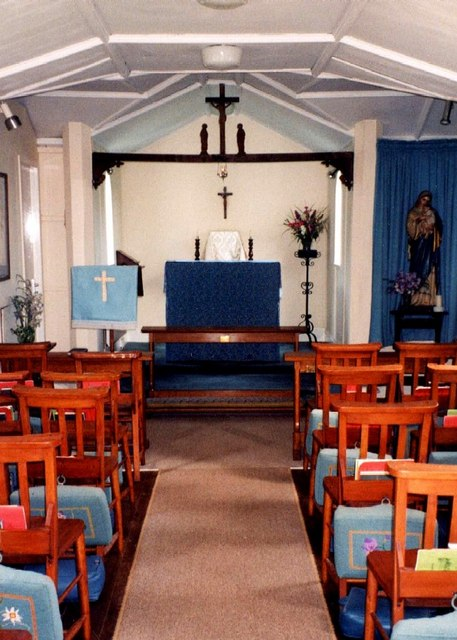
- Interior in 2004
- Our Lady & St Anne's
- 50.789993°N 4.551509°W
- Denomination: Church of England
- Churchmanship: Anglo-Catholicism

History
- Status: Active

Architecture
- Functional status: chapel of ease
- Completed: 1929

Specifications
- Capacity: 22
- Materials: timber, asbestos

Administration
- Diocese: Truro
- Deanery: Stratton
- Parish: Poundstock

The Church of Our Lady and St Anne is a small Anglican church in the village of Widemouth Bay, Cornwall.

The church was built in 1929 as a private oratory and was originally located at the opposite end of the village. Despite its relatively modest age, there are two conflicting theories regarding whom it was originally built for. One holds that it was created for three priests, Claude, Reginald and Frank Kingdom, whose family were the squires of Whitstone, Bridgerule and Poundstock. The brothers used it as a retreat each summer for writing their sermons for the rest of the year. The other theory contends that it was built for two women, identified as Miss Kirby and Miss Topham, who allowed the three brothers to use it each year.

In the 1930s, Widemouth Bay expanded after rising to popularity as a seaside resort, and in 1940, the lightweight church was moved to its present location, a site which had been acquired by the vicar of Poundstock. Our Lady and St Anne's became a chapel of ease for the growing population, who had previously had to travel to St Winwaloe's in Poundstock.

The church has a garden, but this contains no headstones. It has a timber summerhouse, which its congregation built in 2006, and which is used as a community meeting-place. The church's modest dimensions earned it a place in Dixe Wills' 2016 book Tiny Churches.
