= Kents, Cornwall =

Coordinates: 50.728°N 4.564°W

Kents
- Location within Cornwall
- OS grid reference: SX191952
- Civil parish: Jacobstow
- Unitary authority: Cornwall
- Ceremonial county: Cornwall
- Region: South West
- Country: England
- Sovereign state: United Kingdom
- Post town: Bude
- Postcode district: EX23

Kents is a hamlet in the parish of Jacobstow, Cornwall, England.
