= St Gregory's Church, Treneglos =

Church in Cornwall, England

Coordinates: 50°39′52.75″N 4°32′13.82″W

St Gregory’s Church, Treneglos
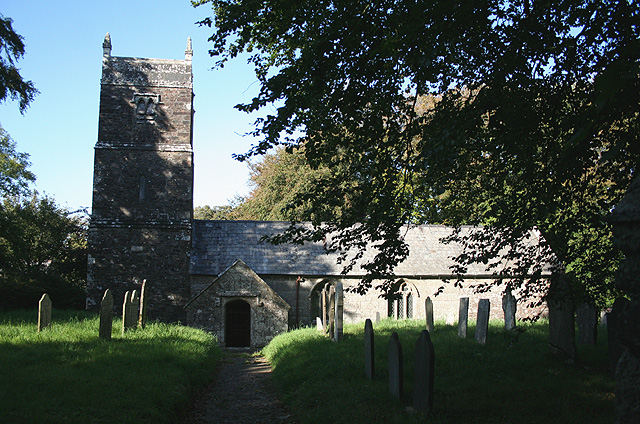
- St Gregory’s Church, Treneglos
- St Gregory’s Church, Treneglos
- Location: Treneglos
- Country: England
- Denomination: Church of England

History
- Dedication: St Gregory

Administration
- Province: Province of Canterbury
- Diocese: Diocese of Truro
- Archdeaconry: Bodmin
- Deanery: Stratton
- Parish: Treneglos

Listed Building – Grade II*
- Official name: Church of St Gregory
- Designated: 22 November 1960
- Reference no.: 1310214

St Gregory's Church, Treneglos is a Grade II* listed parish church in the Church of England in Treneglos, Cornwall.

== History ==
The parish was in the 12th century in the possession of Robert Fitz-William, Lord of Downinney (also Downeckney), who gave it to the priory of Tywardreath. (Note: A Complete Parochial History of the County of Cornwall (1872) states that: "Richard, Steward of the Household, who owned the manor of Downeckney at the time of the Domesday survey, gave this church to the Priory of Tywardreath. From him, the lands descended to the Dinhams and Cardinhams, and then the Braddons.) Warbstow was then a chapelry dependent on Treneglos; the two benefices were later combined as a vicarage (united benefice). Robert was responsible for building the church.

The church was enlarged in the 15th or 16th centuries to include a moulded basket arch added to the north door, the addition of a north aisle with Perpendicular tracery and, near the east end, a rood loft stair turret. In the 16th century the south porch was added; this has an arch to the south door over which is a Norman tympanum. The Norman tympanum and font were perhaps by the same craftsman as those at Egloskerry and Tremaine. The sculptured Norman tympanum, similar to other works in nearby churches, is described as "a conventional tree in the centre, with a pair of beasts having their tails bent round between the legs, and upwards across their bodies, placed symmetrically facing each other." The meaning may be found in the Psalms verse about the vine of Egypt: "The boughs thereof were like goodly cedars... The boar of the wood doth waste it, and the wild beast of the field doth devour it."

During the 17th century, adherents of Roman Catholicism became very scarce in Cornwall; the religious census of 1671 recorded recusants in the parish of Treneglos and four others. The Reverend J. H. Mason was the vicar in the early 19th century; he was appointed in 1804 by the Prince of Wales (who later became king as George IV).

The church, rebuilt in 1858, is dedicated to St George and St Gregory. The church consists of a nave, chancel and north aisle. Four four-centred arches on granite pillars make up the arcade. The original tympanum and font were preserved. In 1871 the tower was being rebuilt. By 1872 the Warbstow and Treneglos parishes made one benefice. The Duke of Cornwall was the patron of the vicarage, with its 31-acre glebe. In 1960 it was listed as a Grade II building.

== Parish status ==
The church is in a joint parish with

- St Werburgh's Church, Warbstow
- St Winwaloe's Church, Poundstock
- St Anne's Church, Whitstone
- Our Lady and St Anne's Church, Widemouth Bay
- St Gennys' Church, St Gennys
- St James' Church, Jacobstow
- St Mary the Virgin's Church, Week St Mary

== Organ ==
The pipe organ dates from 1993 and was built by Mervyn Uglow. A specification of the organ can be found on the National Pipe Organ Register.
