= Southcott, Cornwall =

Coordinates: 50.7304°N 4.5574°W

Southcott: Cornish: Sothdyji
- Hamlets
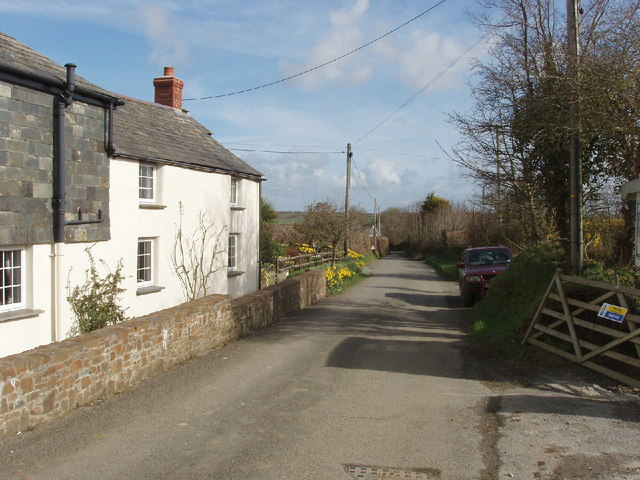
- Lower Southcott

- Location within Cornwall
- Civil parish: Jacobstow
- Unitary authority: Cornwall
- Ceremonial county: Cornwall
- Region: South West
- Country: England
- Sovereign state: United Kingdom
- Post town: BUDE

Southcott (Cornish: Sothdyji) is a hamlet southwest of Jacobstow in north Cornwall, England.

It consists of Higher, Middle and Lower Southcott. Higher Southcott now completely borders Jacobstow and Lower Southcott borders another small hamlet named Kent. At the 2011 census population details were included in the civil parish of Jacobstow.
