= Downinney =

Hamlet in Cornwall, England

Coordinates: 50°40′59″N 4°32′04″W

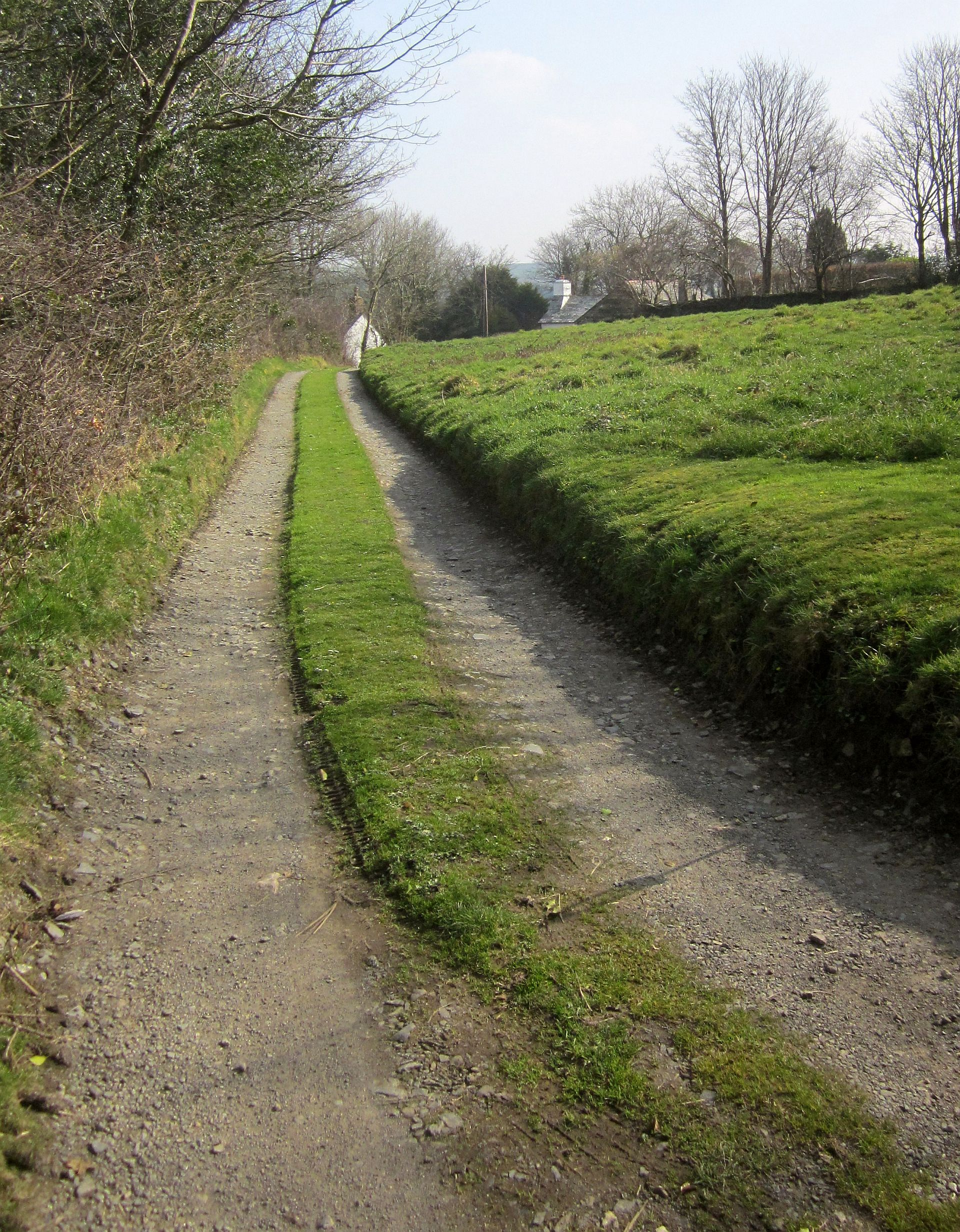
A track in Downinney

Downinney is a hamlet in the civil parish of Warbstow, Cornwall, England. Downinney was recorded in the Domesday Book, 1086: there was land for 12 ploughs with 40 households. There was pasture of one square league and its value was reduced to 40 shillings per year (formerly 60 shillings i.e. £3).
