= Jacobstow =

Village in Cornwall, England

Coordinates: 50.734°N 4.555°W

Jacobstow: Cornish: Logyakob
- Location within Cornwall
- Population: 421 (Civil Parish, 2001); 522 (2011 Census including Bennacott)
- OS grid reference: SX198958
- Civil parish: Jacobstow
- Unitary authority: Cornwall
- Ceremonial county: Cornwall
- Region: South West
- Country: England
- Sovereign state: United Kingdom
- Post town: BUDE
- Postcode district: EX23
- Dialling code: 01840
- Police: Devon and Cornwall
- Fire: Cornwall
- Ambulance: South Western
- UK Parliament: North Cornwall

Jacobstow (Cornish: Logyakob) is a civil parish and village in north Cornwall, England, United Kingdom. The village is located east of the A39 road approximately seven miles (11 km) south of Bude.

Penhallym in the north of the parish is mentioned (as Penhalun) in the Domesday Book; nearby is Penhallam, site of a medieval manor.

The name Jacobstow originates from Saxon times and derives from St James (Latin Jacobus) and holy place. As well as the church town, other settlements in the parish include Southcott and those parts of Canworthy Water north of the River Ottery.

Jacobstow parish is on high ground and is entirely rural in character. It is bounded to the northwest by Poundstock parish, to the east by Week St Mary parish, to the west by St Gennys parish, and to the south by Warbstow parish. The southwest boundary of the parish follows the River Ottery for approximately two miles.

The parish is in the Stratton Registration District and had a population of 421 at the 2001 census.

== Churches and schools ==
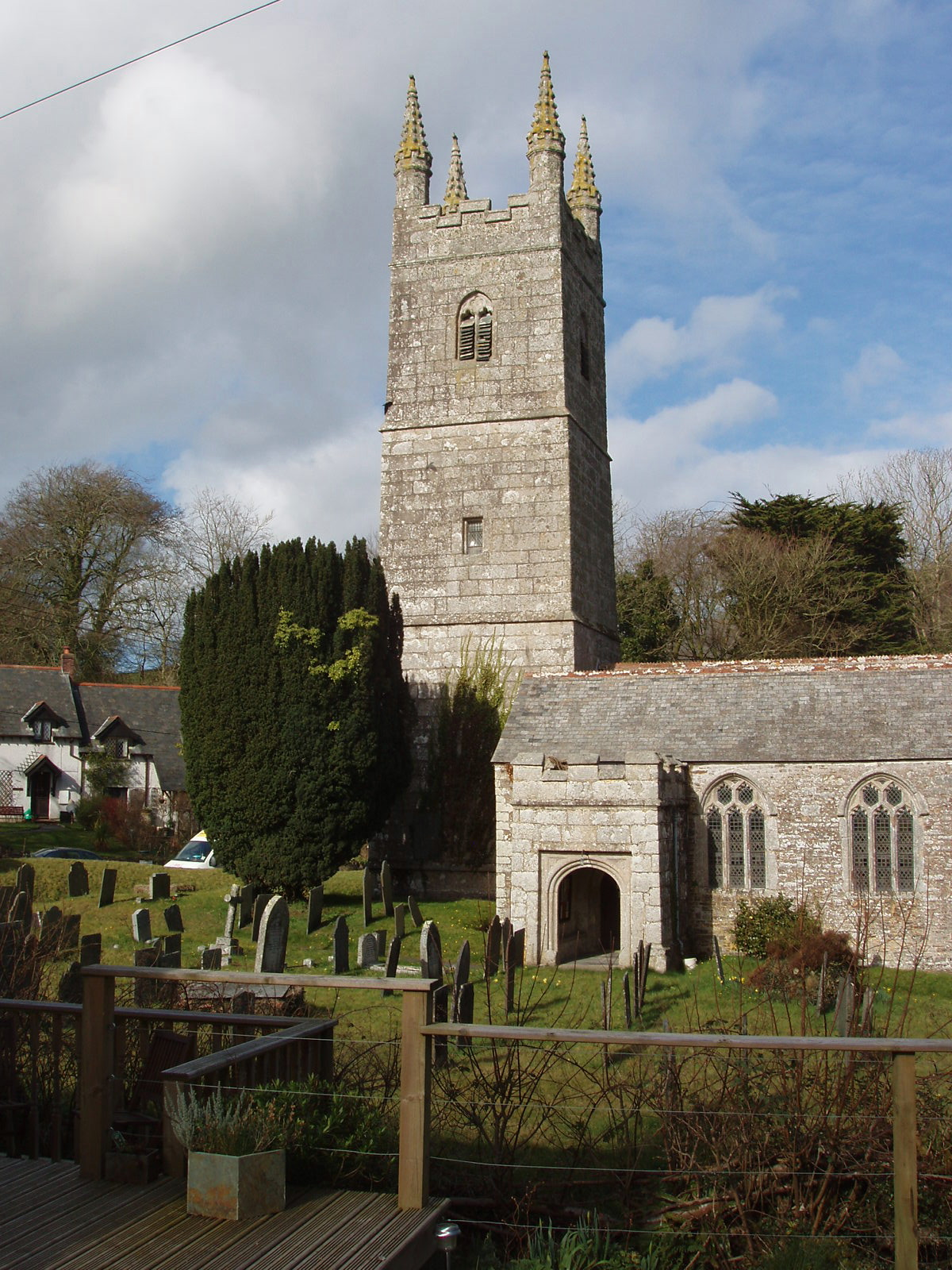
Jacobstow parish church

Jacobstow parish church is dedicated to St James and there is evidence of a former Saxon church on the same site. The present church is of the 15th century with a nave and chancel and north and south aisles. The three-stage battlemented granite tower houses a ring of six bells. The font is Norman of the Altarnun type and the altar is an Elizabethan communion table. An ancient altar stone is in the south aisle chapel: it was the main altar stone up to about 1550 in the reign of Edward VI when the Church of England was becoming more Protestant and an act required that all altar stones should be removed. This one became a footbridge over a stream. It was found and moved back to the churchyard as a seat in the 1800s, and installed in the south aisle chapel in 1972. The nails that form the cross on the base of the altar are 15th century, and were saved from roof restoration work in 1970.

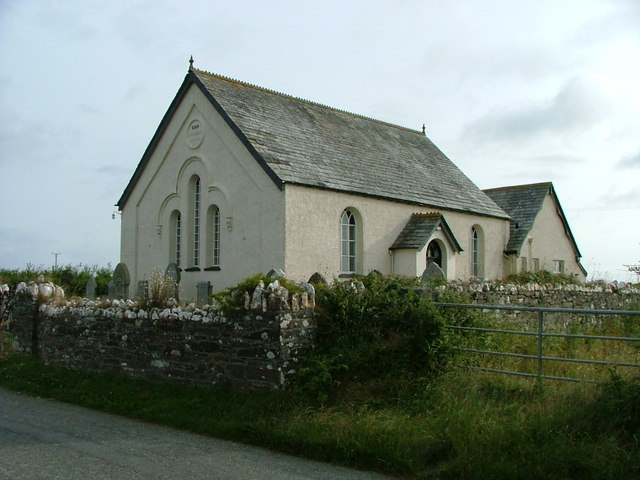
Eden Methodist Chapel, Headon Cross

Jacobstow Community Primary School is situated in the village. The school caters for up to 90 children aged 4–11 years in three classes. Its catchment area includes most of Jacobstow parish as well as parts of Poundstock, St Gennys and Week St Mary parishes.

== Notable people ==
Degory Wheare, a historian, the first Camden Professor of Ancient History in the University of Oxford, was born in Jacobstow.
