= Warbstow Bury =

Iron Age hillfort in Cornwall, England

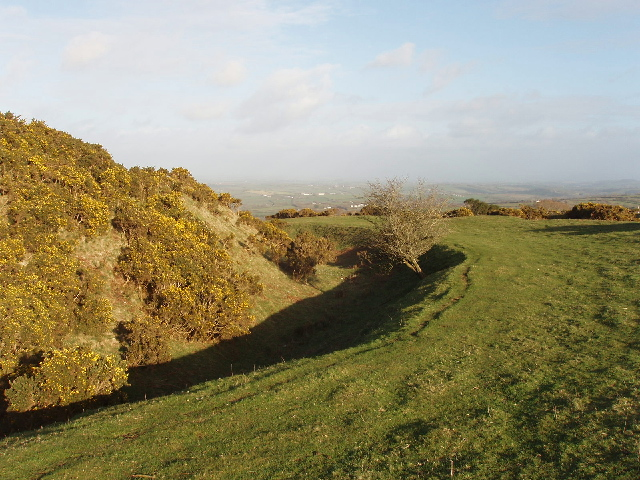
- Rampart and ditch at the south of the fort

- Location within Cornwall
- 50°41′22″N 4°32′51″W
- Type: Hillfort
- Periods: Iron Age
- Location: Near Warbstow, Cornwall
- OS grid reference: SX 201 908

Site notes
- Area: 7.5 hectares (19 acres)

Scheduled monument
- Official name: Large multivallate hillfort called Warbstow Bury and a pillow mound known as the Giant's Grave
- Designated: 26 November 1928
- Reference no.: 1006710

Warbstow Bury is an Iron Age hillfort about 0.5 miles (0.8 km) west of the village of Warbstow, in Cornwall, England. It is a scheduled monument.

== Location and description ==
The site is 807 feet (246 m) above sea level, on a hill at the heads of two tributaries of the River Ottery. There are views to Lundy Island and Dartmoor.

The fort is one of the largest earthworks in Cornwall. It is an oval enclosure, area about 7.5 hectares (19 acres). There are two concentric ramparts and ditches; the ramparts are up to 5.8 metres (19 ft) high, with ditches up to 2.7 metres (8.9 ft) deep. Between these, in the southern part, are the remains of an earlier rampart.

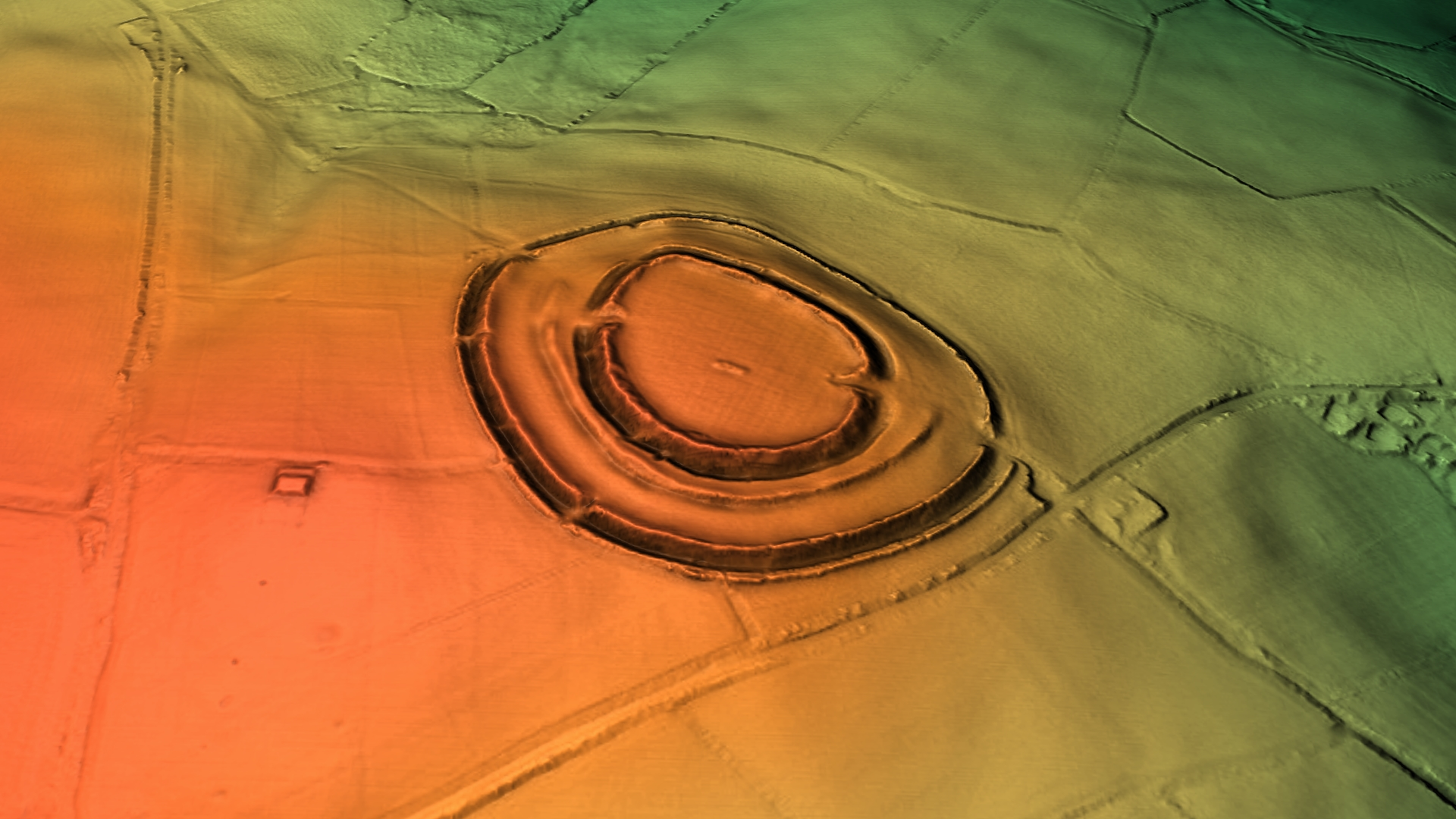
3D view of the digital terrain model

The inner rampart has two original entrances, inturned and facing each other, on the north-west and south-east, and there are corresponding simple entrances in the outer rampart.

=== Pillow mound ===
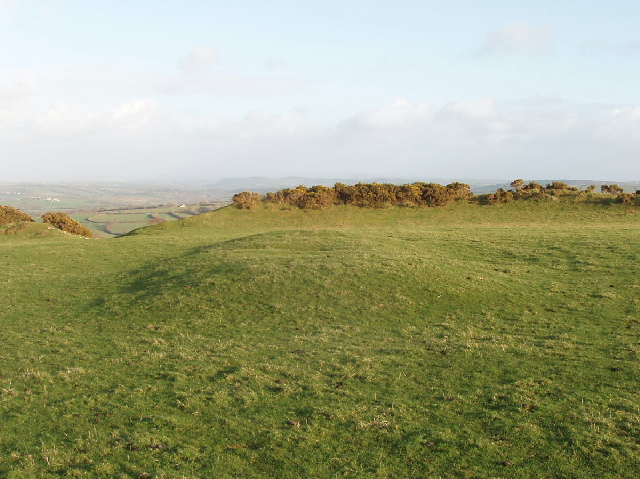
The pillow mound in the centre of the fort

In the centre of the fort is a medieval rabbit warren: a rectangular mound, or pillow mound, about 22 metres (72 ft) long, 10 metres (33 ft) wide and 0.6 metres (2.0 ft) high. It is known as "The Giant's Grave" or "King Arthur's Grave".

== See also ==
- Hillforts in Britain
