= Poundstock =

Hamlet in Cornwall, England

Coordinates: 50.767°N 4.551°W

Poundstock: Cornish: Tregorlann
- Location within Cornwall
- Population: 860 (United Kingdom Census 2011 including Coombe and Helstock)
- OS grid reference: SX 202 995
- Civil parish: Poundstock
- Unitary authority: Cornwall
- Ceremonial county: Cornwall
- Region: South West
- Country: England
- Sovereign state: United Kingdom
- Post town: Bude
- Postcode district: EX23
- Dialling code: 01288
- Police: Devon and Cornwall
- Fire: Cornwall
- Ambulance: South Western
- UK Parliament: North Cornwall

Poundstock (Cornish: Tregorlann) is a civil parish and a hamlet on the north coast of Cornwall, England, United Kingdom. The hamlet is situated four miles (6.5 km) south of Bude half-a-mile west of the A39 trunk road about one mile from the coast.

Poundstock civil parish is in the Registration District of Stratton. It is bounded to the west by the Atlantic Ocean; to the north by Marhamchurch parish, to the east by Week St Mary parish, and to the south by the parishes of Jacobstow and St Gennys. The population of the parish in the 2001 census was 805, increasing to 925 at the 2011 census. An electoral ward bearing the same name also exists with a population at the same census of 3,846.

The manor of Poundstock was recorded in the Domesday Book (1086) when it was held by Jovin from Robert, Count of Mortain. Before 1066 it had been held by Gytha who paid tax for one virgate of land but there was one hide of land and land for 6 ploughs. There were 2 ploughs, 1 serf, 1 villein, 3 smallholders, 10 acres of woodland, 40 acres of pasture, 10 cattle and 50 sheep. The value of the manor was £1; "this land is of St. Kew's".

A free community magazine, The Poundstock Packet, is produced every two months and distributed to every household in the parish.

== Parish church and Gildhouse ==
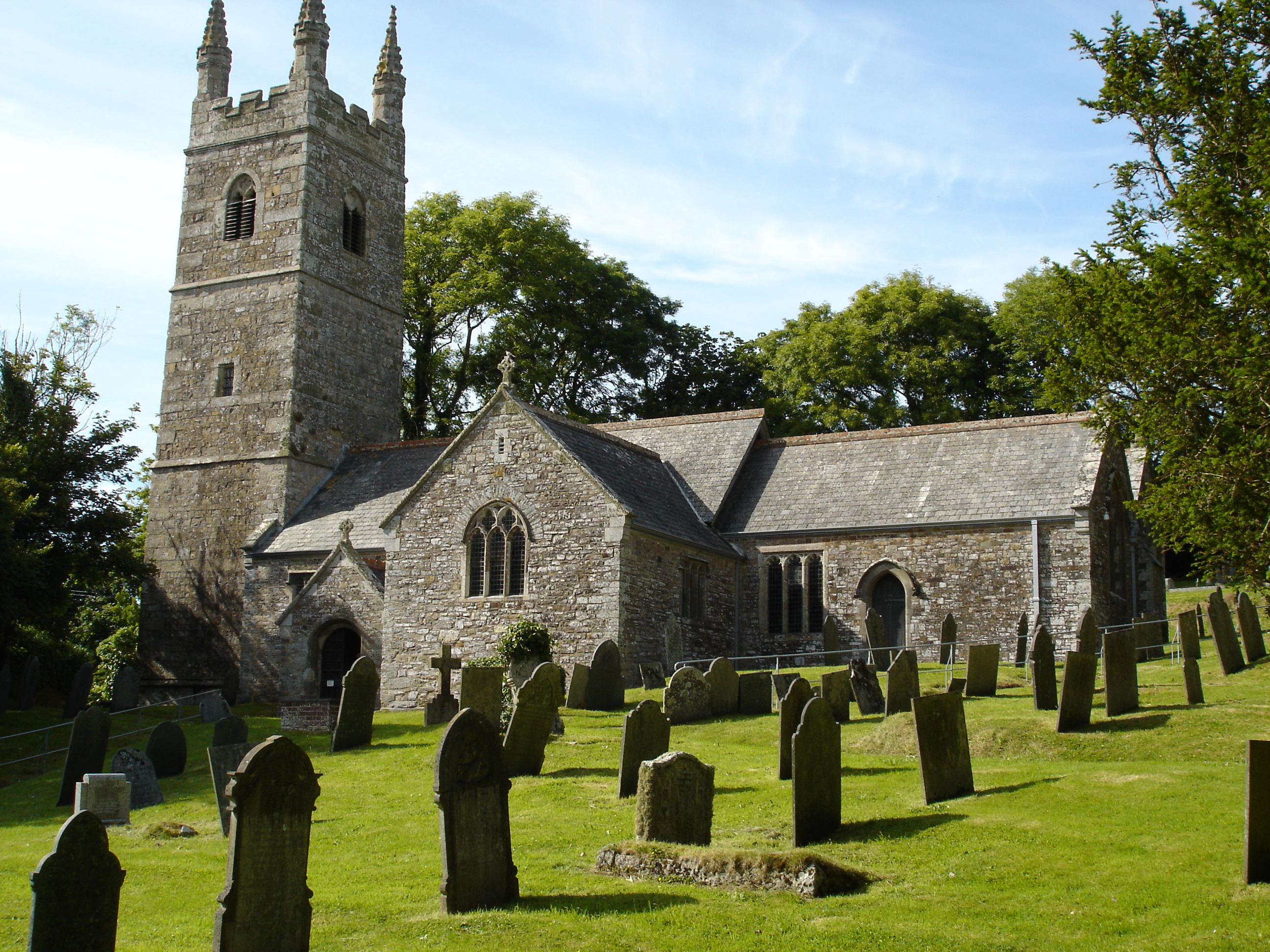
St Winwaloe's, Poundstock

The parish church of St Winwaloe is at grid reference SX 202 994 in Poundstock hamlet and its battlemented tower houses a ring of six bells, rehung in 2000. The medieval church consists of a nave, chancel, north transept, north aisle and west tower. The aisle is of 15th-century date and the church was tactfully restored by J. D. Sedding. Features of interest include the Gothic font (probably 13th century), the Jacobean pulpit, and three wall paintings on the north wall. These are much faded but interesting for their iconography: they are the Tree of Deadly Sins, the Warning to Sabbath-breakers and the Weighing of Souls.

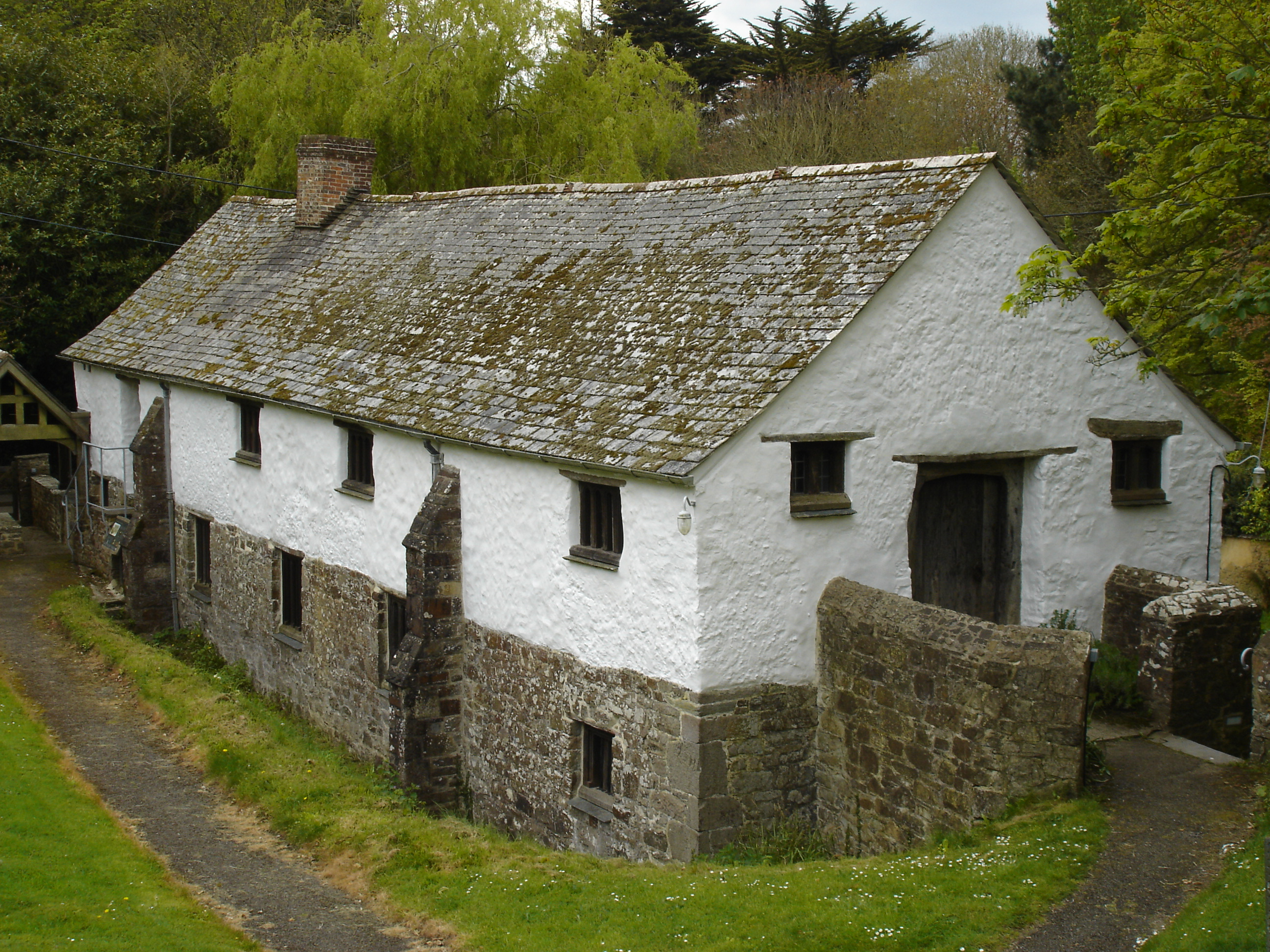
Poundstock Gildhouse, 2012

Next to the church, Poundstock Gildhouse is a well-preserved late medieval church house, the only surviving one of its kind in Cornwall that is still used for its original purpose. It has been used continuously since it was built and is a Grade I listed building. Following a substantial restoration in 2007–2008, under the direction of architect Jonathan Rhind, the Gildhouse received the Royal Institute of British Architects South West Town and Country Conservation award for 2009. In March 2012 the Gildhouse was a winner of a European Union laureate for cultural heritage/Europa Nostra award in the conservation section and in early June was given the Europa Nostra Grand Prix.

== Other buildings ==
=== Penfound Manor ===
Penfound manor house is built round a large medieval hall whose roof has collar-beams on arched braces. Additions to the hall are a massive chimney-stack in the north wall and a small room with solar above at the southwest corner. The windows are Tudor and the entrance porch has a granite doorway with an inscription of 1642. East of this are an inner hall which contains a 17th-century staircase, and a former dairy, built in Stuart times.

=== Rebel Cinema ===
This relatively new cinema is situated just off the Atlantic Highway, and opened on 11 August 1988. Originally, the cinema site was a garden centre and café, but was purchased by the Collard family in 1986 to convert it into a cinema, as the nearest cinema to Bude was over 30 miles away in Wadebridge. It was built and designed by the film producer, Mervyn Collard (who produced actor David Jason's first film, White Cargo. Mervyn died in 2004). Work started on the build at the end of 1987, and Westar 7000s projectors were installed, along with the carpets and seats and other fittings. The projectors were moved from the former Strand Cinema in Bideford, Devon. The architect was Martin Back.

The building frontage is in mock Greek style with a classical pediment, and two columns. The opening night film was a charity screening of Snow White and the Seven Dwarfs. Some changes have been made since opening, including the projectors now replaced with Cinemeccanica Victoria 9s, and the ticket office and foyer have been modified.

The Rebel was sold to Michael Flook of Kaler Cinemas in 1991/1992 and subsequently sold to the Willis family in May 2000 who trade as Rebel Cinemas Limited to the present day. B A Willis has been involved in booking films for the Rebel Cinema since the early 1990s until taking over ownership and running in May 2000 in time for the opening of the film Saving Grace which was filmed locally in Cornwall at Port Isaac.

The Rebel closed in August 2007 and re-opened in August 2011 after a refurbishment took place with new seating installed and re-stepped to give added leg room between rows. The sound systems were also updated and digital projection equipment Digital 3D Installed. A second screen was built and opened in July 2014.

== Notable people ==
- John Penrose, Vicar of Poundstock
