= St James' Church, Jacobstow =

St James’ Church, Jacobstow
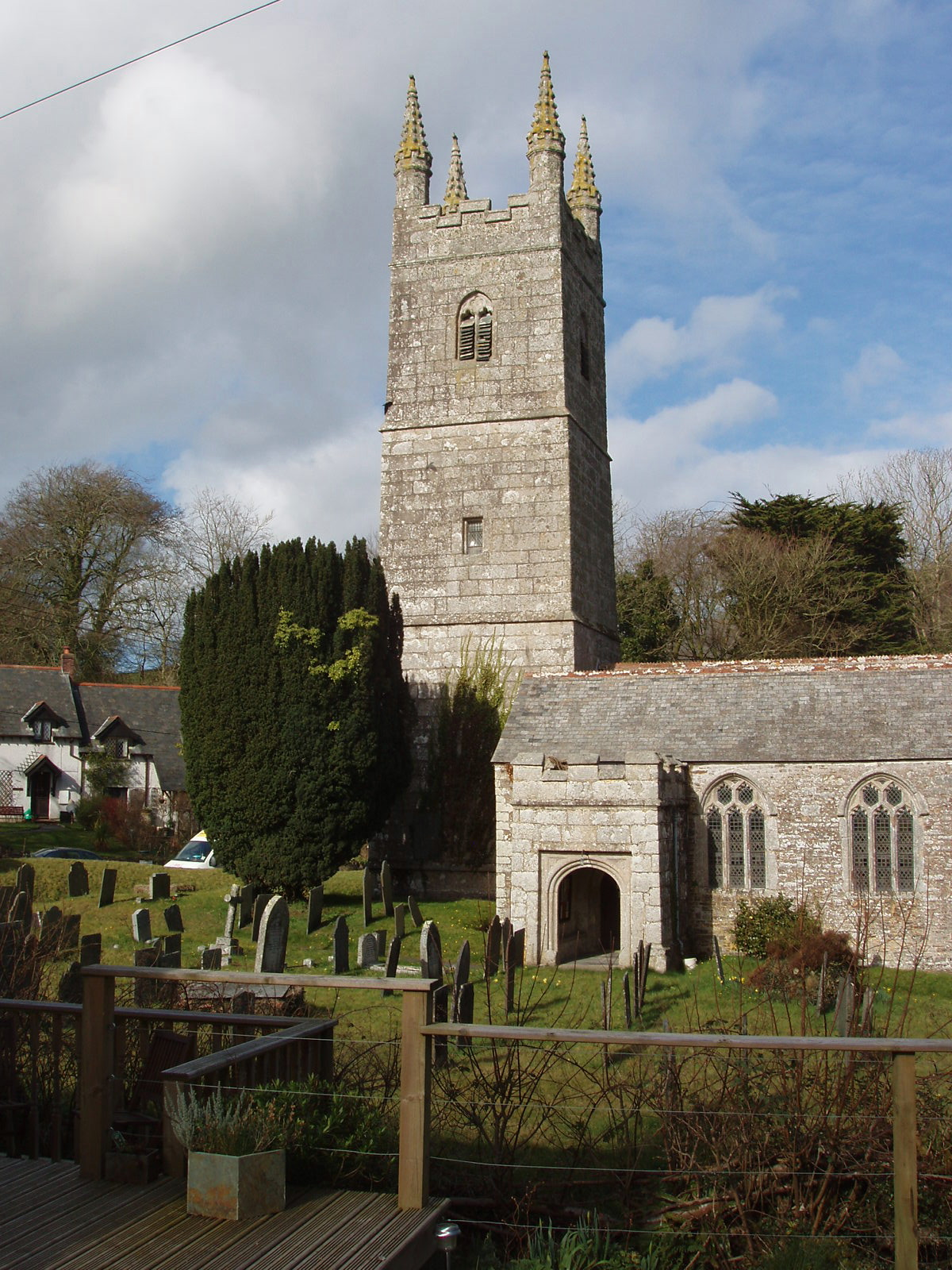
- St James’ Church, Jacobstow
- St James’ Church, Jacobstow
- 50°44′1.68″N 4°33′16.25″W
- Location: Jacobstow
- Country: England
- Denomination: Church of England

History
- Dedication: St Jacob

Specifications
- Height: 85 feet (26 m)

Administration
- Province: Province of Canterbury
- Diocese: Diocese of Truro
- Archdeaconry: Bodmin
- Deanery: Stratton
- Parish: Jacobstow
- Location within Cornwall

Listed Building – Grade I
- Official name: Church of St James
- Designated: 29 September 1961
- Reference no.: 1328255

St James’ Church, Jacobstow is a Grade I listed parish church in the Church of England in Jacobstow, Cornwall.

== History ==
The earliest records date from the 13th century. On the day after Trinity Sunday, 1270, the Bishop admitted to the rectory Richard de Cetrefort, sub-deacon; patron, Sir Henry de Campo Armilfii (Champernowne). In the taxation of Pope Nicholas IV the church of Jacobstow was taxed at £6. About 1297, William, then chaplain of Jacobstow was one of the priests incarcerated in the Royal prison at Launceston Castle, on account of their refusal to surrender half their income to the Royal expenditure.

The church dates from the 15th century and replaces an earlier building.

The chancel was rebuilt and the nave roof replaced at a cost of £700 in 1886 by architect Otho Bathurst Peter of Launceston. The windows were repaired and reglazed. The church was reseated. The aisle roofs were reslated and releaded, the stonework was cleaned down and repointed. The east and south chancel walls were rebuilt on their old lines. New two windows were inserted in the chancel. The floors were relaid and renewed, and the chancel floor was tiled throughout. It was reopened on 4 August 1886 by the Bishop of Truro.

== Parish status ==
The church is in a joint parish with

- St Gregory's Church, Treneglos
- St Werburgh's Church, Warbstow
- St Winwaloe's Church, Poundstock
- Our Lady and St Anne's Church, Widemouth Bay
- St Gennys’ Church, St Gennys
- St Mary the Virgin's Church, Week St Mary
- St Anne's Church, Whitstone

== Organ ==
The organ is by J Trudgian & Son. A specification of the organ can be found on the National Pipe Organ Register.
