= Whitstone =

Village and civil parish in east Cornwall, England

Coordinates: 50.760°N 4.459°W

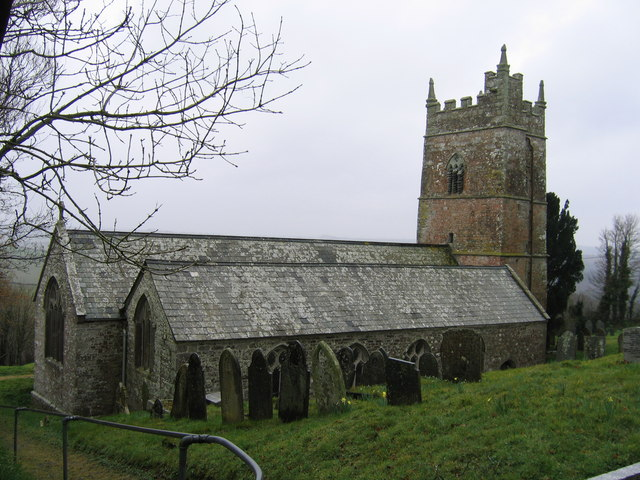
St Anne's Church, Whitstone

Whitstone is a village and civil parish in east Cornwall, England, United Kingdom. It is roughly halfway between the towns of Bude and Launceston. The population at the 2011 census was 590.

== History ==
The earliest mention of the village is in the Domesday Book of 1086, when Whitstone was called 'Witestan', and was held by Ralph from the Count of Mortain. There was 1 furlong of land and half a plough, 1 serf, 12 acres of woodland, 8 cattle, 8 pigs, 40 sheep and 40 goats. The value of the manor was 15 shillings though it had formerly been worth £1 sterling.

In the 19th century, the parish was called Whitstone. There were around 500 villagers, and a post office, and the entire parish comprised around 4,000 acres (16 km^{2}). The Bude Canal passed through it.

Froxton Farmhouse (19th century) is a Grade II* listed building. Froxton was also a manor recorded in the Domesday Book when it was held by Thurstan from Judhael of Totnes. There were 3 furlongs of land and land for 3 ploughs. There was half a plough, 4 serfs, 2 smallholders, 50 acres of woodland, 40 acres of underwood, 8 cattle and 12 pigs. The value of the manor was 11 shillings though it had formerly been worth 15 shillings.

== Geography ==
Whitstone is situated on the B3254 road, halfway between Bude (a major tourist destination) and Launceston (a former capital of Cornwall). Whitstone is around three miles (5 km) from the coast, at Widemouth and surrounded by rolling hills and fields. From the higher points of the village, you can see as far as Dartmoor (to the east) and Bodmin Moor (to the south). Down a minor road, from the B3254, is the entrance to Whitstone Woods, which reaches over to Week St Mary, and includes a river that creates the border to Whitstone parish and is a tributary for the larger river that runs through Bude, the River Neet. In the village, Launceston and Bude are both 9 miles away.

The Parish Plan 2010 states that Whitstone has 582 inhabitants in 207 households. The proportion of 18- to 30-year-olds is well below the national average and the opposite is true of those of pension age. The parish of Whitstone is bounded to the east by the river Tamar and the Devon county border, to the north by Bridgerule, northwest Marhamchurch, southwest Week St Mary and southeast Boynton and North Tamerton. The B3254 carries about 3000 vehicles per day of which 150 are HGVs (based on the last traffic count which was outside the tourist season). The main employment is agriculture and agricultural services, with construction and public sector employment (the two schools) roughly equal second; tourism and haulage are also important to the village. Self-employment is 3 times the national average.

== Layout and communications ==
The village is built along the B3254, with houses, detached or semi-detached, bungalows and terraces. There are two small housing estates off the main road, and several farms on the outskirts of the village. The adjoining roads in the village are home to most of the population.

Whitstone and Bridgerule railway station on the line from Okehampton to Bude served the village, opening in 1898 and closing in 1966.

== Places of worship ==
Whitstone has two places of worship, a Methodist Chapel and a Church of England Church.

The Methodist Chapel is at the centre of the village. The Anglican Church of St Anne is in one of the smaller lanes off the main road. There is a long path by the cemetery leading down to the church. The church is one of the oldest buildings in the village, built around 1400: it has two aisles and a west tower. Notable features are the Norman doorway and the Norman font. The church was restored in 1882. There is also a separate cemetery for non-churchgoers (given to the village in 1926).

== Business and economics ==
The village has around nine businesses, including a convenience store and a recording studio owned by international singer/songwriter Tori Amos.
