= St Werburgh's Church, Warbstow =

Church in Cornwall, England

Coordinates: 50°41′4.55″N 4°32′32.47″W

St Werburgh’s Church, Warbstow
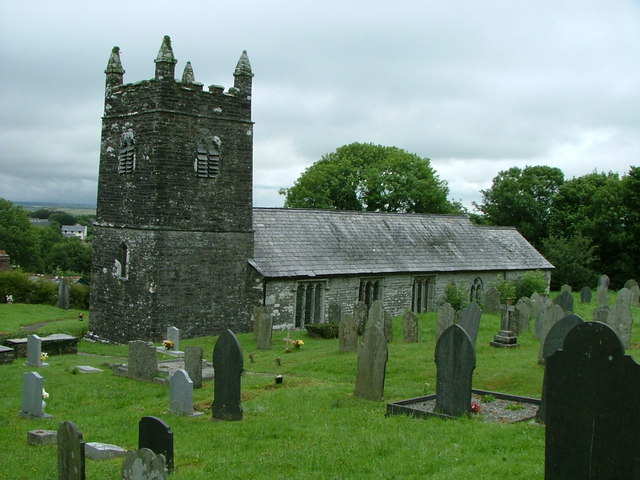
- St Werburgh’s Church, Warbstow
- St Werburgh’s Church, Warbstow
- Location: Warbstow
- Country: England
- Denomination: Church of England

History
- Dedication: St Werburgh

Administration
- Province: Province of Canterbury
- Diocese: Diocese of Truro
- Archdeaconry: Bodmin
- Deanery: Stratton
- Parish: Warbstow

Listed Building – Grade II*
- Official name: Church of St Werburgha
- Designated: 22 November 1960
- Reference no.: 1161531

St Werburgh's Church, Warbstow is a Grade II* listed parish church in the Church of England in Warbstow, Cornwall.

== History ==
Both the neighbouring parish of Treneglos and Warbstow belonged in the 12th century to the Lords of Cardinham who donated them to the priory of Tywardreath. Warbstow was then a chapelry to Treneglos and the two benefices were later united as a vicarage. According to Charles Henderson, writing in 1925, "The presence ... of St Werburga ... is not easily accounted for (though the parish is famous for geese which figure in her legend)".

The church was originally Norman, but largely rebuilt in the 15th century. The north porch was added in 1601. It was restored in 1861.

There is a tower of two stages to the west of the nave and a north aisle; until 1861 the church also had a south transept. Features of interest include the north porch of granite blocks (the north doorway is of Polyphant stone) and the font which is a fine example of the Altarnun type.

== Parish status ==
The church is in a joint parish with

- St Gregory's Church, Treneglos
- St Winwaloe's Church, Poundstock
- St Anne's Church, Whitstone
- Our Lady and St Anne's Church, Widemouth Bay
- St Gennys’ Church, St Gennys
- St James' Church, Jacobstow
- St Mary the Virgin's Church, Week St Mary

== Organ ==
A specification of the organ can be found on the National Pipe Organ Register.
