= Trelash =

Hamlet in Cornwall, England

Coordinates: 50.6838°N 4.5683°W

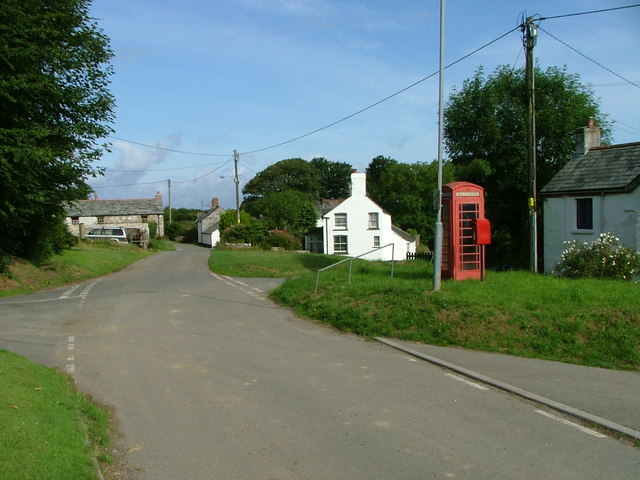
Trelash

Trelash (Cornish: Trelosk) is a hamlet in the civil parish of Warbstow, Cornwall, England, United Kingdom.
