= St Mary the Virgin's Church, Week St Mary =

St Mary the Virgin’s Church, Week St Mary
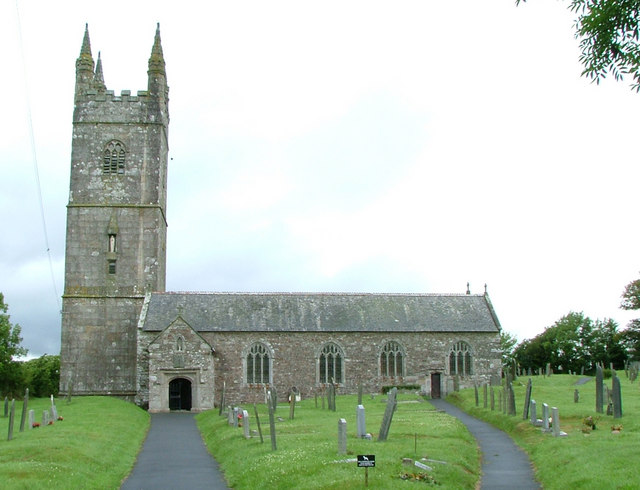
- St Mary the Virgin’s Church, Week St Mary
- St Mary the Virgin’s Church, Week St Mary
- 50°45′7.42″N 4°30′2.3″W
- Location: Week St Mary
- Country: England
- Denomination: Church of England

History
- Dedication: The Nativity of the Blessed Virgin Mary

Administration
- Province: Province of Canterbury
- Diocese: Diocese of Truro
- Archdeaconry: Bodmin
- Deanery: Stratton
- Parish: Week St Mary

Clergy
- Rector: The Revd David Barnes
- Location within Cornwall

Listed Building – Grade I
- Official name: Church of the Nativity of the Blessed Virgin Mary
- Designated: 29 September 1961
- Reference no.: 1137655

St Mary the Virgin's Church, Week St Mary, also known as the Church of the Nativity of the Blessed Virgin Mary, is a Grade I listed parish church in the Church of England Diocese of Truro, in Week St Mary, Cornwall, England, UK.

== History ==
Week St Mary has a 14th–15th century parish church dedicated to St Mary the Virgin and the tower contains a ring of six bells.

The church was restored between 1878 and 1881 by James Piers St Aubyn.

The church is a Grade I listed building.

== Parish status ==
The church is in a joint parish with

- St Gregory's Church, Treneglos
- St Werburgh's Church, Warbstow
- St Winwaloe's Church, Poundstock
- Our Lady and St Anne's Church, Widemouth Bay
- St Gennys’ Church, St Gennys
- St James' Church, Jacobstow
- St Anne's Church, Whitstone

== Organ ==
The organ is by Bevington. A specification of the organ can be found on the National Pipe Organ Register.
