= St Anne's Church, Whitstone =

St Anne’s Church, Whitstone
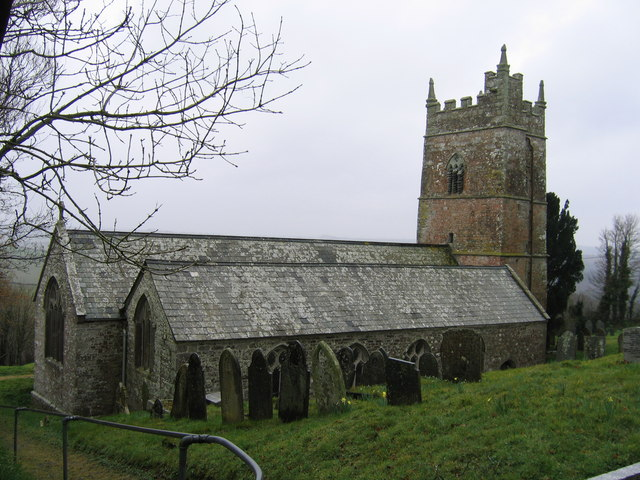
- St Anne’s Church, Whitstone
- St Anne’s Church, Whitstone
- 50°45′39.34″N 4°27′51.27″W
- Location: Whitstone
- Country: England
- Denomination: Church of England

History
- Dedication: St Anne

Administration
- Province: Province of Canterbury
- Diocese: Diocese of Truro
- Archdeaconry: Bodmin
- Deanery: Stratton
- Parish: Whitstone
- Location within Cornwall

Listed Building – Grade I
- Official name: Parish Church of St Anne
- Designated: 29 September 1961
- Reference no.: 1142426

St Anne's Church, Whitstone is a Grade I listed parish church in the Church of England Diocese of Truro in Whitstone, Cornwall, England, UK.

== History ==
The church dates from the 13th century. the upper part of the tower and the arcades are 15th century. The chancel, porch and interior were rebuilt in 1882 by Samuel Hooper of Hatherleigh. The renovation of the windows, with the addition of new windows was executed by Messrs Beer and Driffield of Exeter. The restoration cost £2,000.

== Parish status ==
The church is in a joint parish with

- St Gregory's Church, Treneglos
- St Werburgh's Church, Warbstow
- St Winwaloe's Church, Poundstock
- Our Lady and St Anne's Church, Widemouth Bay
- St Gennys’ Church, St Gennys
- St James' Church, Jacobstow
- St Mary the Virgin's Church, Week St Mary

== Organ ==
A new organ was presented in 1880 by Edward Mucklow of Bennets in the parish.

== Bells ==
The 3 medieval bells were expanded to 4 in the 18th century. In 1831 the tenor was recast by Mears of the Whitechapel Bell Foundry. In 1885 two additional trebles were cast by Llewellyn and James of Bristol, and the tenor was recast by John Warner & Sons of Cripplegate Foundry, to bring the ring up to 6.
