= St Winwaloe's Church, Poundstock =

Coordinates: 50°46′0.2″N 4°33′2.9″W

St Winwaloe’s Church, Poundstock
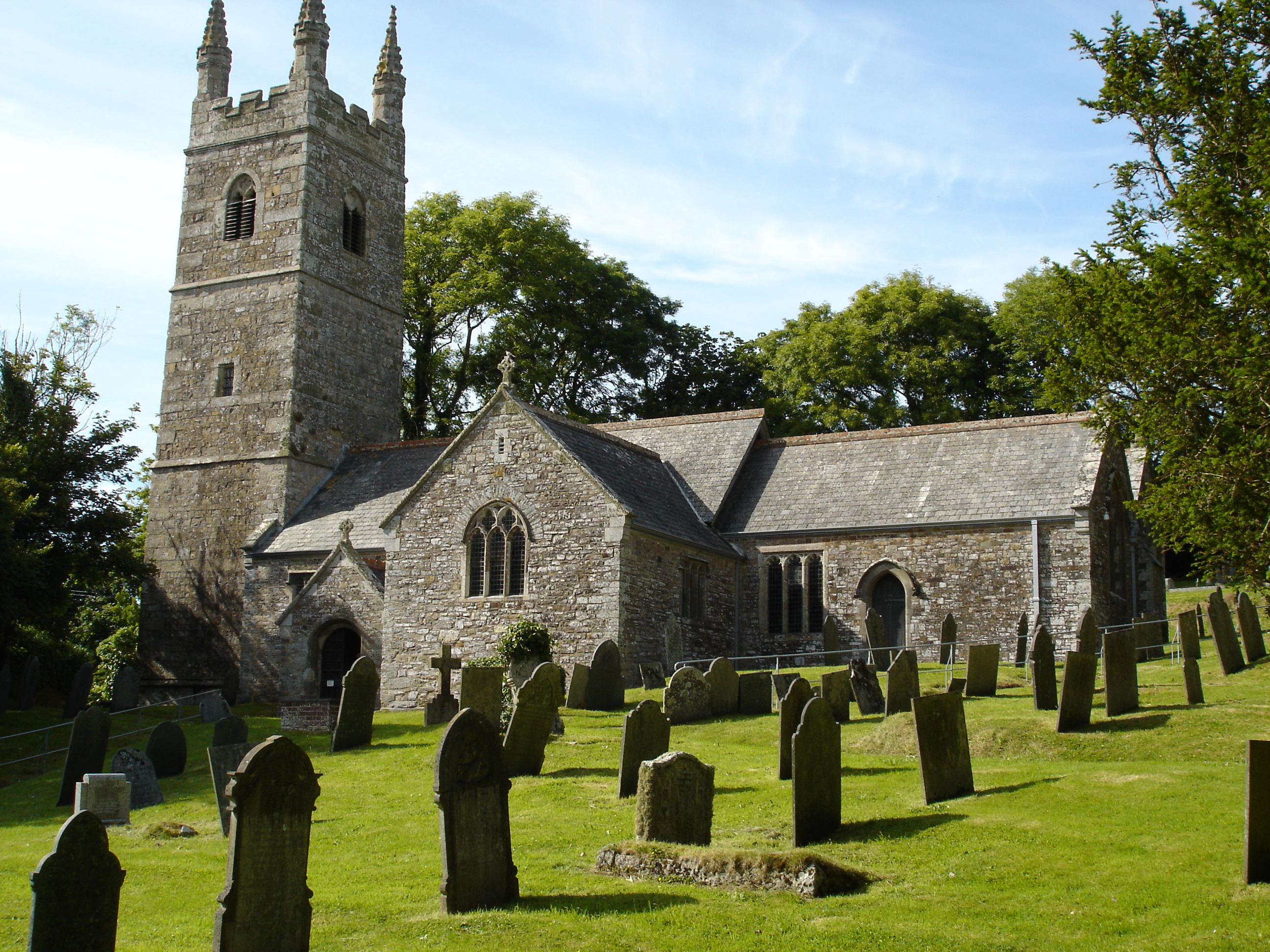
- St Winwaloe’s Church, Poundstock
- St Winwaloe’s Church, Poundstock
- Location: Poundstock
- Country: England
- Denomination: Church of England

History
- Former name: St Neot’s Church, Poundstock
- Dedication: St Winwaloe

Administration
- Province: Province of Canterbury
- Diocese: Diocese of Truro
- Archdeaconry: Bodmin
- Deanery: Stratton
- Parish: Poundstock
- Location within Cornwall

Listed Building – Grade I
- Official name: Church of St Neot
- Designated: 29 September 1961
- Reference no.: 1231799

St Winwaloe's Church, Poundstock is a Grade I listed parish church in the Church of England in Poundstock, Cornwall.

== History ==
The church was originally dedicated to St Winwaloe, but later this changed to St Neot. In the 1970s, the church re-adopted the dedication of St Winwaloe. The transept in the building dates from the 13th century, with the nave, aisle, chancel and west tower being late 15th century. It was restored by George Fellowes Prynne in 1896. Features of interest include the Gothic font (probably 13th century), the Jacobean pulpit, and three wall paintings on the north wall. These are much faded but interesting for their iconography: they are the Tree of Deadly Sins, the Warning to Sabbath-breakers and the Weighing of Souls.

The church has a one manual pipe organ but an electric organ is now played at services.

== Parish status ==
The church is in a joint parish with

- St Gregory's Church, Treneglos
- St Werburgh's Church, Warbstow
- St Anne's Church, Whitstone
- Our Lady and St Anne's Church, Widemouth Bay
- St Gennys’ Church, St Gennys
- St James' Church, Jacobstow
- St Mary the Virgin's Church, Week St Mary
