= Ebenezer Baptist Chapel, Newquay =

Ebenezer Baptist Chapel
- Newquay Baptist Church
- Ebenezer Baptist Chapel
- Location: Chapel Hill, Newquay, TR7 1ND
- Country: England
- Denomination: Reformed Baptist; Evangelicalism
- Website: https://ebenezerbaptistchapel.co.uk/

History
- Former name: Newquay Baptist Church (1997 - 2022)
- Founded: 1822

Architecture
- Architect: John Ennor (1870)
- Years built: 1822; 1870 (rebuilt)

Ebenezer Baptist Chapel is a Reformed Baptist and Evangelical church, located at the southern end of Broad Street at Chapel Hill, overlooking the western arm of Manor Road in Newquay, Cornwall. It is one of the oldest religious building in Newquay, and was founded in 1822 as Ebenezer Baptist Chapel. In 1997, the church was renamed as Newquay Baptist Church, until the church voted to revert to its original historic name in January 2023.

In 1852, the Methodists opened the Wesley Methodist Chapel which was on the same road nearby.

== History ==
Before the chapel was built the Particular or Strict Baptists formed themselves into a community and met for worship in the old malthouse opposite Primrose House on Beach Road. They had regular Sunday supply of preachers from Plymouth, Torquay, and Truro.

The first chapel built in 1822 was crowned with a thatched roof. This was eventually removed and a slate roof put on. The slate was quarried from the cliffs on the Newquay side of Glendorgal Point, and Thomas Osborne was the mason who slated the roof. In 1856 the Rev. John Bath took charge of the church, and continued to minister there for over twenty years.

The worshippers at Ebenezer were Strict and Particular, or Calvinistic Baptists.

When the accommodation became inadequate and according to Ennor the building was in need of replacing, it was decided to build another chapel. The old chapel was demolished and a larger chapel was erected by Ennor and reopened on 9 August 1870, the new chapel would seated 200 people. Two sermons were preached by the Reverend Moses of Falmouth on the opening of the new chapel, after which collections were made in aid of defraying the building expenses. Mary Moyses was the first to be baptized by immersion in the baptistry of the new chapel. Previous to the erection of this building and baptistry, those who joined the church were baptized either in the harbour or on the beach. Since the present chapel was erected, a schoolroom with a minister's vestry over it, has been added.

The chapel is only accessible from the main road by a narrow footpath. Since 1839, it had been assumed that the footpath was held under the same trusts as the chapel, however, during 2016 it came to light that the title to the footpath was not owned by the chapel trustees. The Grace Baptist Trust Corporation was able to assist the church in dealing with the legal owner and the Land Registry to acquire title of the footpath, thereby safeguarding access to the chapel in perpetuity.
