= Week St Mary =

Civil parish and village in northeast Cornwall

Coordinates: 50.746°N 4.500°W

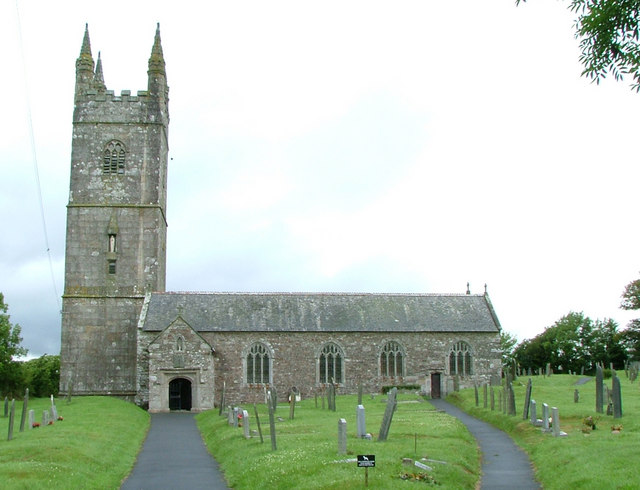
Week St Mary Church.

Week St Mary (Cornish: Gwigvaria (village) or Pluw Varia (parish)) is a village and civil parish in northeast Cornwall, England, United Kingdom. It is situated south of Bude close to the River Tamar and the border between Cornwall and Devon in the Hundred of Stratton. The parish population at the 2011 census is 657.

Week St Mary has a 14th–15th century parish church dedicated to St Mary the Virgin and the tower contains a ring of six bells. The parish is in the diocese of Truro.

== History ==
The manor of Week was recorded in the Domesday Book (1086) as having one hide of land and land for eight ploughs. It was one of twenty-eight manors held by Richard from Robert, Count of Mortain. There were three ploughs, four serfs, six villeins and ten smallholders. There were 2 acres of woodland and one square league of pasture. There were forty sheep and twenty-five other beasts. The value of the manor was £1-10 s.

Parts of the college founded here by Thomasine Bonaventure in 1506 have been converted into a farmhouse. It is now owned by the Landmark Trust. The building of the college was overseen by John Dinham of Wortham who remodelled his own house Wortham Manor at about the same time. As well as being a school the college was also a chantry and the schoolmaster was required to pray for the souls of the foundress's husbands. The chantry led to it being dissolved in 1548 though in 1546 it was said to be "a great comfort to all the country there".

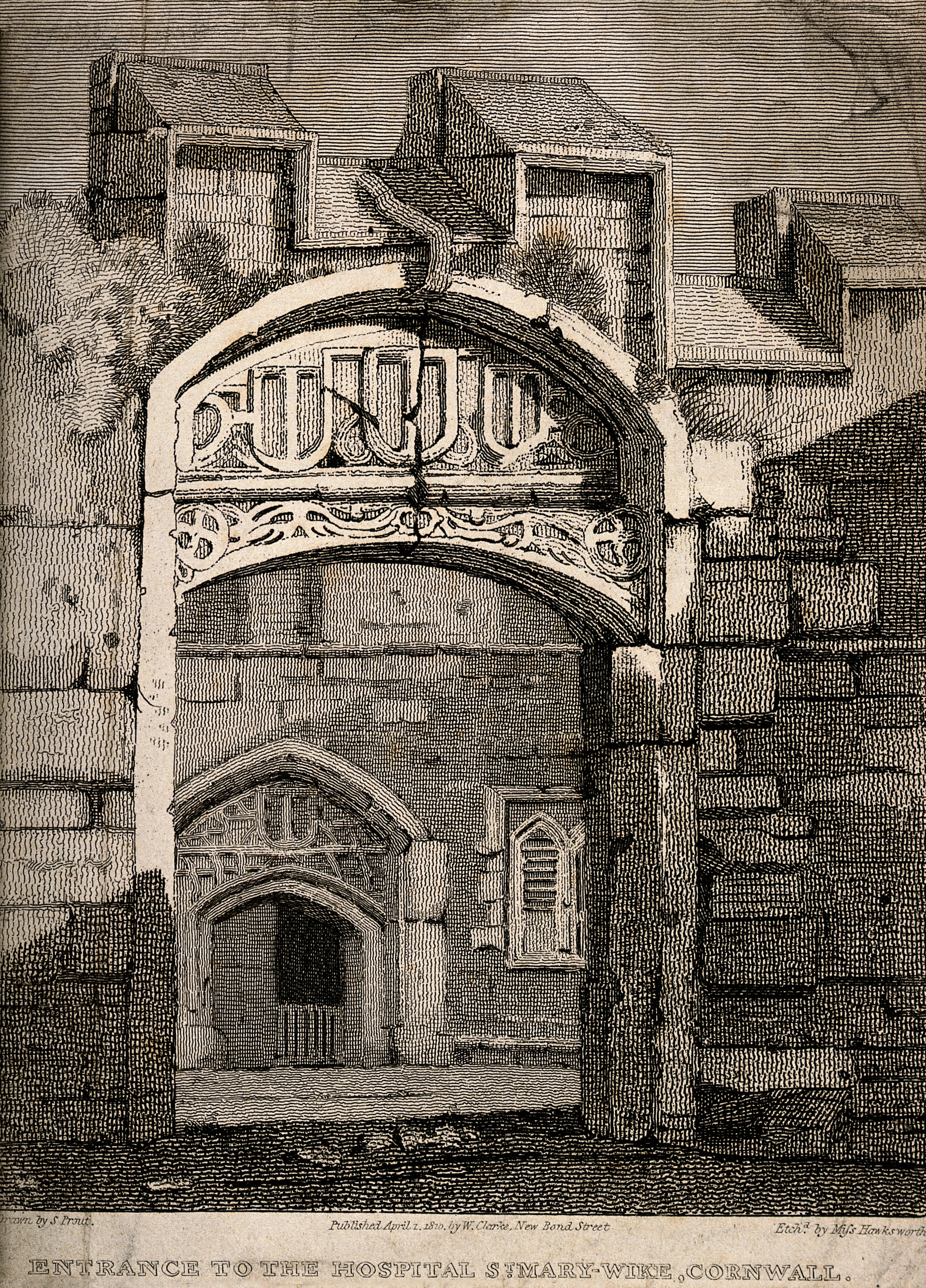
Entrance to the Hospital, St. Mary-Wike, Cornwell. Etching by J. Hawksworth, 1810, after Samuel Prout.

The 14th–15th century church was hit by lightning in 1878 throwing one of the basement stones of the pinnacle 20 ft (6.1 m) from the tower. The stones at the base of the tower are now separated by gaps of 3 in (7.6 cm) to 4 in (10.2 cm). The church tower had been hit by lightning on two previous occasions.

== Geography ==
The parish covers an area of 6,123 acres (24.78 km^{2}) or 9.6 square miles (24.8 km^{2}), and had a population of 550, according to the 2001 census, 657 in 2011.

=== Protected areas ===
The parish contains two Sites of Special Scientific Interest (SSSI), both noted for their biological interest. Brendonmoor SSSI, in the east of the civil parish, was notified in 1990 and Greenamoor SSSI, also a nature reserve jointly owned by Plantlife and Cornwall Wildlife Trust, was designated in 1992.
