= Grampound with Creed =

Civil parish in Cornwall, England

Coordinates: 50.298°N 4.900°W

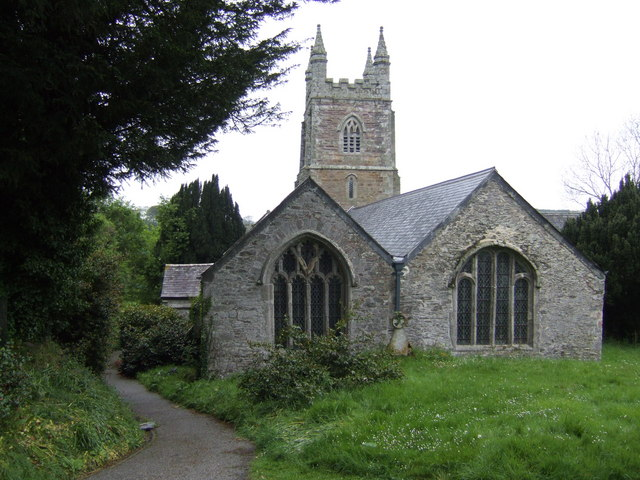
- St Crida's Church, Creed

- Location within Cornwall
- Population: 850 (Parish, 2021)
- Civil parish: Grampound with Creed
- Unitary authority: Cornwall
- Ceremonial county: Cornwall
- Region: South West
- Country: England
- Sovereign state: United Kingdom
- Post town: TRURO
- Postcode district: TR2

Grampound with Creed (Cornish: Ponsmeur a'byth Sen Krida) is a civil parish in Cornwall, England, United Kingdom. The two major settlements in the parish are the ancient town of Grampound and the smaller village of Creed (Cornish: Krida). The larger settlement, Grampound, is situated approximately six miles (10 km) west of St Austell at grid reference SW 935 483, and Creed is one mile (1.6 km) south at SW 934 472.

Grampound with Creed is bordered by St Stephen-in-Brannel parish to the north, St Ewe parish to the east and Cuby parish to the south. On the west, the parish boundary generally follows the River Fal, which separates it from Probus parish. At the 2021 census the parish had a population of 850.

== History ==
In medieval times, Creed formed part of the manor of Tybesta, which was mentioned in the Domesday Book of 1087 under the name "Tibesteu".

Creed was an ancient parish in the Powder Hundred of Cornwall. The town of Grampound was established in the parish in Norman times and quickly overtook the small village of Creed in size. Grampound was made a borough in 1332.

From the 17th century onwards, parishes were given various civil functions under the poor laws in addition to their original ecclesiastical functions. In Creed's case, such civil functions were performed separately for the area of the borough of Grampound and the rest of the parish. In 1866, the legal definition of 'parish' was changed to be the areas used for administering the poor laws, and so Grampound became a separate civil parish from Creed. Despite the split of the civil parish, Grampound remained part of the ecclesiastical parish of Creed.

In 1983 the civil parishes of Creed and Grampound were merged into a new parish called "Grampound with Creed", effectively reuniting the ancient parish of Creed under a new name.

== Governance ==
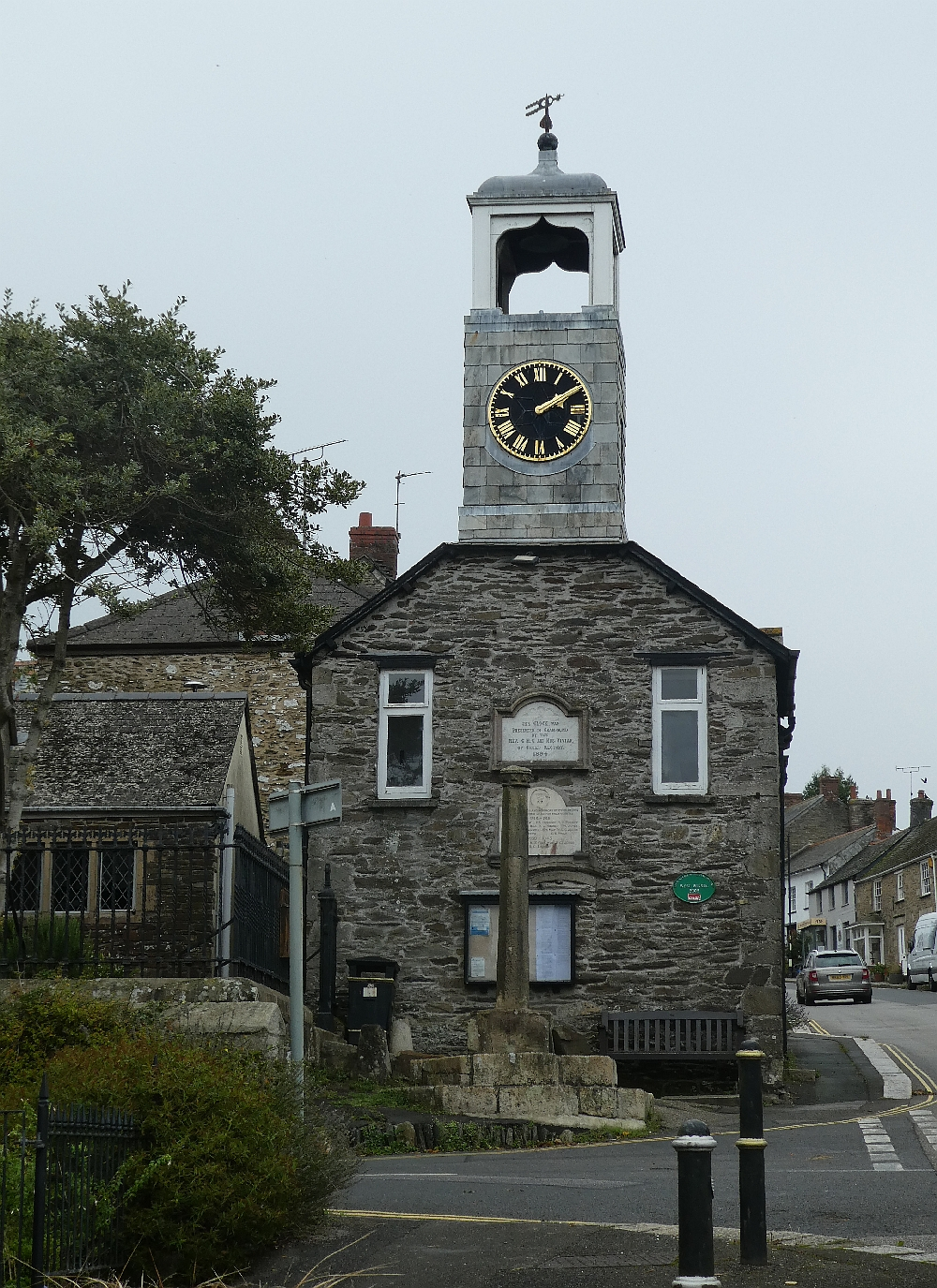
Grampound Town Hall

There are two tiers of local government covering Grampound with Creed, at parish and unitary authority level: Grampound with Creed Parish Council and Cornwall Council. The parish council meets at Grampound Town Hall.

== Churches ==
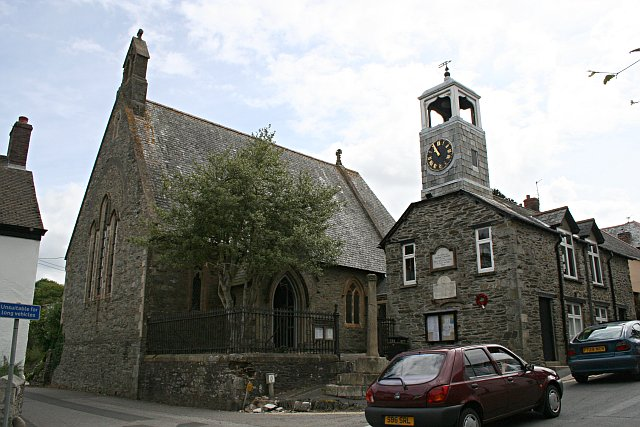
St Non church, Grampound

The ecclesiastical parish is in the Deanery and Hundred of Powder and in the Diocese of Truro. The parish church is in Creed village and is dedicated to St Crida. Much of the church is medieval, but the three-stage battlemented tower was added in 1733 and contains two medieval bells. The other Anglican church in the parish stands in Grampound and is dedicated to St Nun. There were also Wesleyan Methodist and Bible Christian chapels in Grampound.
