= St Hermes' Church, St Erme =

Church in Cornwall, England

St Hermes’ Church, St Erme
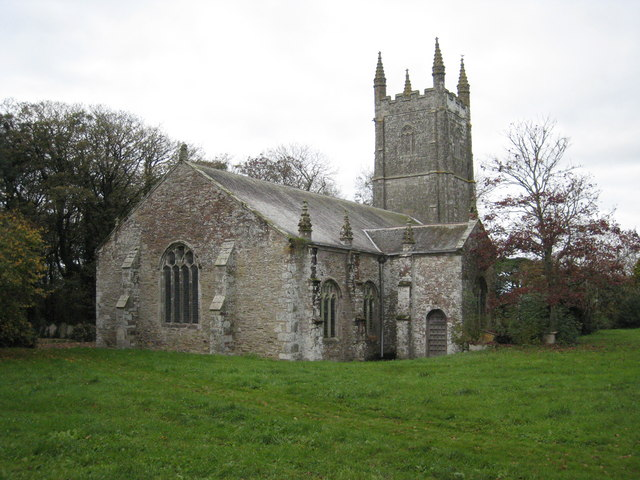
- St Hermes’ Church, St Erme
- St Hermes’ Church, St Erme
- 50°18′33.480″N 5°1′33.204″W
- Location: St Erme
- Country: England
- Denomination: Church of England

History
- Dedication: St Hermes

Administration
- Province: Province of Canterbury
- Diocese: Diocese of Truro
- Archdeaconry: Cornwall
- Deanery: Powder
- Parish: St Erme

Listed Building – Grade II*
- Official name: Church of St Hermes
- Designated: 30 May 1967
- Reference no.: 1136778

St Hermes’ Church, St Erme is a Grade II* listed parish church in the Church of England Diocese of Truro in St Erme, Cornwall, England, UK.

== History ==
Gilbert Hunter Doble suggested that the original dedication to a local saint Erme had been changed at a later date to the Greek saint Hermes. (Doble preached on the parish feast 28 August 1934 and enlarged versions of his sermon were then published in Laudate vol. xii and as no. 35 of the Cornish Saints Series.}

The church was rebuilt in 1819-20 by John Foulston (apart from the tower which is medieval) for the Revd. Cornelius Cardew. The church was later restored in 1906. The tower was restored with new floors and beams and a new lead roof, and the pinnacles were reset. The bells were recast and increased in number to form a new peal of six. A new south doorway was built of Polyphant stone, and new doors of solid oak were installed. New windows were inserted into the belfry, the gift of the Dean and Chapter of Truro Cathedral.

The font is Norman and there is a brass of 1596 to Robert Trencreek and family. According to Charles Henderson "The long incumbencies of two wealthy and scholarly rectors in the 18th century reduced the fabric of the church to such a ruinous condition that it had to be rebuilt in 1820, when a new plan was unhappily chosen. Efforts were made to reconcile this with older work in 1908."

Cornelius Cardew (d. 1831) served as curate and as rector of the parish altogether for 60 years and his portrait is in the church.

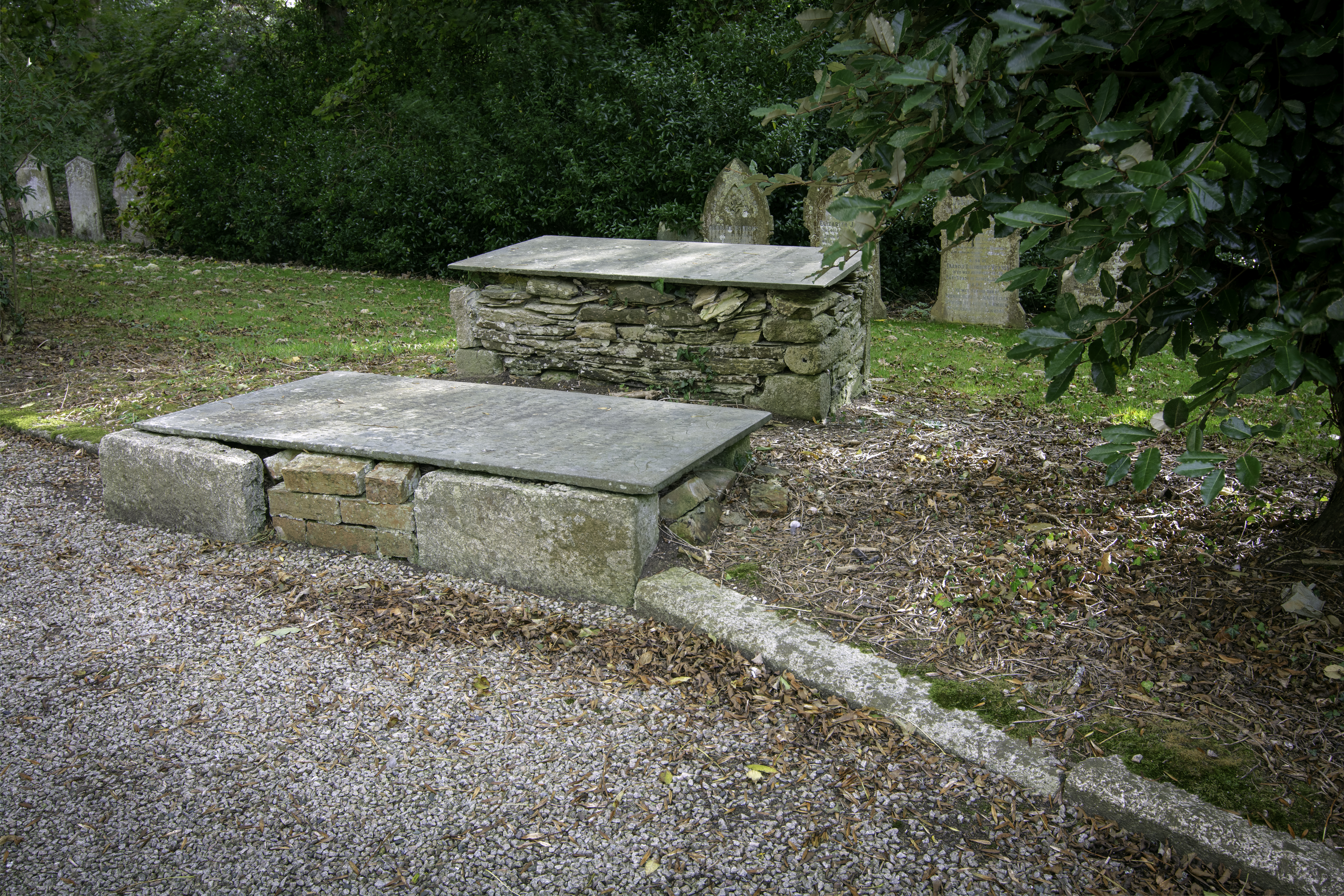
The two Trethewy Monuments in St Hermes' churchyard

In the churchyard, approximately 5 Metres South Of Tower, lie the Grade II listed buildings of Two Trethewy Monnuments. The First of which is dedicated in memory of Catherine the daughter of Anthony and Elizabeth Trethewy who departed this life the 29th July 1792. The second of which is dedicated to the memory of Anthony Trethewy who departed this life on the 6th day of August 1799. Also Elizabeth Trethewy, who departed on the 7th May 1805. Also Anthony the son of Anthony and Elizabeth Trethewy, who departed this Life on the 2nd of July 1801. Also Amy the daughter of Anthony and Elizabeth Trethewy who departed this life on the 28th July1804.

== Parish status ==
The church is in a joint parish with

- St Crida's Church, Creed
- St Nun's Church, Grampound
- St Ladoca's Church, Ladock
- St Probus and St Grace's Church, Probus

== Organ ==
The church had an organ by Hele & Co dating from 1927. A specification of the organ can be found on the National Pipe Organ Register.
