= Creed, Cornwall =

Village in Cornwall, England

Coordinates: 50.28817°N 4.89971°W

Creed
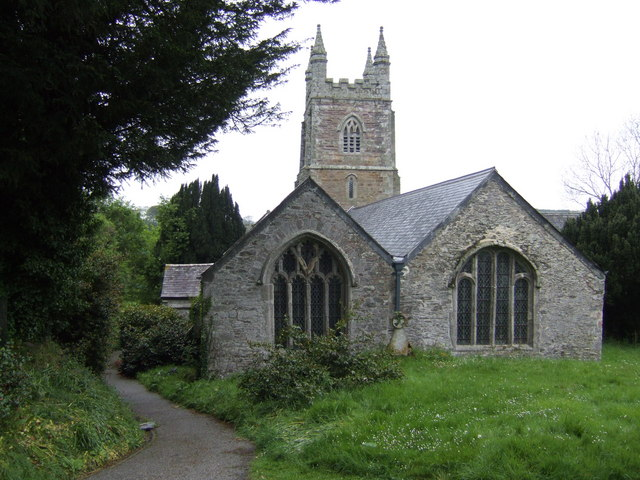
- Creed Parish Church

- Location within Cornwall
- OS grid reference: SX935472
- Civil parish: Grampound with Creed
- Shire county: Cornwall
- Region: South West
- Country: England
- Sovereign state: United Kingdom
- Post town: Truro
- Postcode district: TR2
- Police: Devon and Cornwall
- Fire: Cornwall
- Ambulance: South Western

Creed (Cornish: Krid) is a village in the civil parish of Grampound with Creed in Cornwall, England. It lies less than a mile south of Grampound and roughly midway between Truro and St Austell.

== Toponymy ==
The parish takes its name from Cride, a saint about whom little to nothing is known, to whom the parish church is dedicated.

== History ==
Creed was an ancient parish in the Powder Hundred of Cornwall. The manor of Tybesta was the head manor of the hundred of Powder at the time of Domesday Book in 1086, and was later one of the seventeen Antiqua maneria of the Duchy of Cornwall. It included the whole of the parish of Creed and parts of other parishes.

The town of Grampound was established in the parish in Norman times and quickly overtook the small village of Creed in size. Grampound was made a borough in 1332.

From the 17th century onwards, parishes were given various civil functions under the poor laws in addition to their original ecclesiastical functions. In Creed's case, such civil functions were performed separately for the area of the borough of Grampound and the rest of the parish. In 1866, the legal definition of 'parish' was changed to be the areas used for administering the poor laws, and so Grampound became a separate civil parish from Creed. Despite the split of the civil parish, Grampound remained part of the ecclesiastical parish of Creed.

In 1983 the civil parishes of Creed and Grampound were merged into a new parish called "Grampound with Creed", effectively reuniting the ancient parish of Creed under a new name. At the 1971 census (one of the last before the abolition of the parish), Creed had a population of 203.

== Parish church ==
The church of St Crida was of Norman foundation but in its existing form is more or less of the 15th century (the tower which had already been built in 1447 however was rebuilt in 1734). Between 1869 and 1906 the church was unused. It has a tower of three stages, a fine south aisle and a south porch. Parts of the old woodwork have been preserved. By 1291 the church was cruciform; of this the north transept and some masonry in the north wall remain. In the mid 15th century the south transept was replaced by an ambitious south aisle, with lavish windows, and an unusually rich south porch. Features of interest include the 15th century wagon roof of the south aisle, a Norman pillar piscina, the 13th century Catacleuse stone font, and the chest tomb of Thomas and Margaret Denys (died 1589 and 1578).

The church is covered in natural Cornish slating on the north and south slopes of the roof, with a ridge on the north chapel and south aisle. The south porch is provided with a hog's back unglazed natural clay ridge tile. The roof has no Coping stone or Cross finials. The roof of the tower is unusually formed of Copper sheeting welted with a fleet to the gully on the north side of the tower. The tower is decorated with carved crotcheted granite pinnacles.

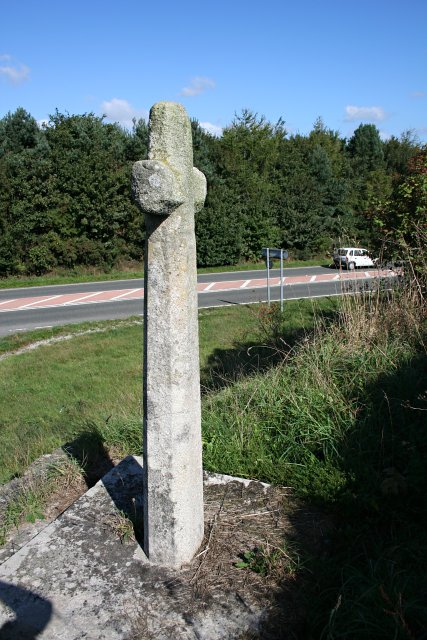
Nancor Cross, by a road junction east of Grampound

William Gregor, the discoverer of titanium, was rector here. Dr. Reginald Merther-derwa was Rector 1423–47; his will provided for the erection of a series of stone crosses at Camborne. The five similar stone crosses in Creed parish, including one now at Grampound church, may also have been due to him. Merther-derwa's will says "New stone crosses to be put up of the usual kind in those parts of Cornwall from Kayar Reslasek to Camborne church where dead bodies are rested on the way to their burial, that prayers may be made and the bearers take some rest". As there are no Gothic stone crosses in Camborne or adjacent parishes it is likely that these crosses were set up at Creed instead. In Creed parish there are the remains of four 15th-century crosses, three of which were cut from Pentewan stone. The market cross of Grampound is more ornate than the other three crosses. Fair Cross is a Gothic cross shaft. Nancor Cross has a cross head which was found in the 1920s near Nancor Farm; it was later set on a new shaft and erected beside the A390 road. In 1995 it was broken into four pieces but repaired in 1996. The fourth cross consists only of a cross base at Creed Lane.
