= St Ladoca's Church, Ladock =

Coordinates: 50°19′13.16″N 4°57′35.27″W

St Ladoca’s Church, Ladock
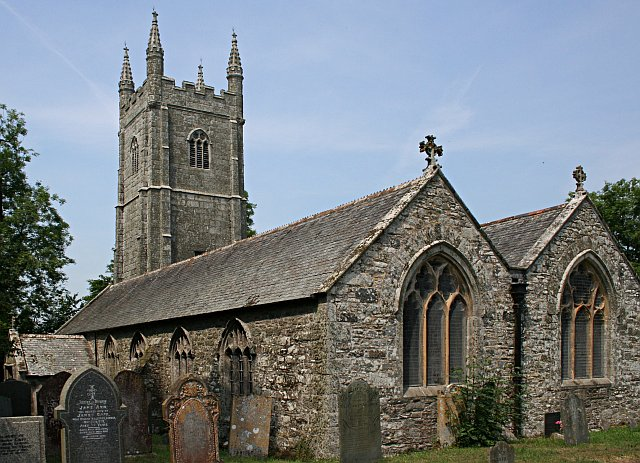
- St Ladoca’s Church, Ladock

- Location: Ladock
- Country: England
- Denomination: Church of England

History
- Dedication: St Ladoca

Administration
- Province: Province of Canterbury
- Diocese: Diocese of Truro
- Archdeaconry: Cornwall
- Deanery: Powder
- Parish: Ladock

Listed Building – Grade I
- Official name: Church of St Ladoca
- Designated: 17 October 1984
- Reference no.: 1310553

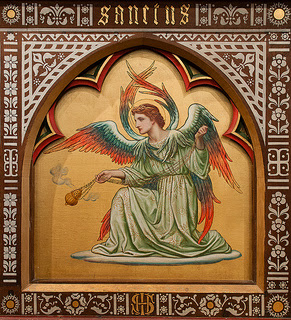
Edward Arthur Fellowes Prynne altar front at Ladock Church.

St Ladoca's Church, Ladock, is a Grade I listed parish church in the Church of England Diocese of Truro in Ladock, Cornwall, England, UK.

== History ==
The parish church of St Ladoca has a fine west tower built of granite blocks. The north side of the church is 13th-century in date while the south aisle is 15th-century and the chancel was much repaired and altered by George Edmund Street in 1862–64. The contractor was Messrs Bone of Liskeard and the restoration cost £2,000. Most of the walls were rebuilt. The gallery was taken down, and the church was partly re-roofed. The mullions and dressings of the windows were in Ham Hill stone. New seating was provided of stained deal, with carved ends, and the sittings were covered with scarlet pile carpeting. The pulpit was new, of open stone and woodwork, consisting of pitch pine with ebony shafts, and stone base by Clarke of Bath. A new low oak screen divided the nave from the chancel. The chancel was improved in 1863 with an east window of stained glass by Morris, Marshall, Faulkner & Co. of London, representing the different Marys mentioned in the New Testament, the centre light representing Mary, the sister of Lazarus, at the house of Simon the leper. Additional windows by the same firm, designs by Edward Coley Burne-Jones and Ford Maddox Brown, were placed in 1869-70 and 1897. The windows have been characterised as "the best display of Morris & Co. glass in Cornwall"; William Morris had been a pupil of G. E. Street, and this project was their first professional collaboration. The flooring of the aisles was laid with squares of Portland stone, diagonally placed with black and red tiles. The chancel was laid with encaustic tiles of different colours, alternating with Portland stone. The reredos was made with dark encaustic tiles on the two sides with carved alabaster in the centre, and a super-altar of polished serpentine, with a painted front by Edward Arthur Fellowes Prynne. In the centre of the reredos, a large cross of Irish marble was inlaid.

Interesting features include the carved base of the rood screen and the font of Catacleuse stone. The feast traditionally celebrated in the parish is held on the Sunday after the first Thursday in January.

== Parish status ==
The church is in a joint parish with

- St Crida's Church, Creed
- St Nun's Church, Grampound
- St Probus and St Grace's Church, Probus
- St Hermes' Church, St Erme

== Bells ==
A new peal of six bells was installed in 1883 by William Aggett & Sons of Chagford, with the bells cast by John Taylor & Co of Loughborough. They replaced three older bells, two of which were dated 1670 and one 1715. In 1925, the peal was augmented to eight bells by the addition of two treble bells.

In 2025, the bells underwent a restoration by Taylor’s of Loughborough. This involved recasting four bells (no. 3-6) and retuning the remainder. The 19th century wooden bell frames were replaced with cast-iron frames on a steel grillage, and the belfry floor was lowered by 5 feet to improve structural stability. The bells were removed from the tower on 15 June 2025 and formally rededicated by the Bishop of Truro on 29 March 2026.

== Organ ==
The church contains an organ by Henry Willis. A specification of the organ can be found on the National Pipe Organ Register.
