= John Hawkins (geologist) =

English geologist and writer (1761–1841)

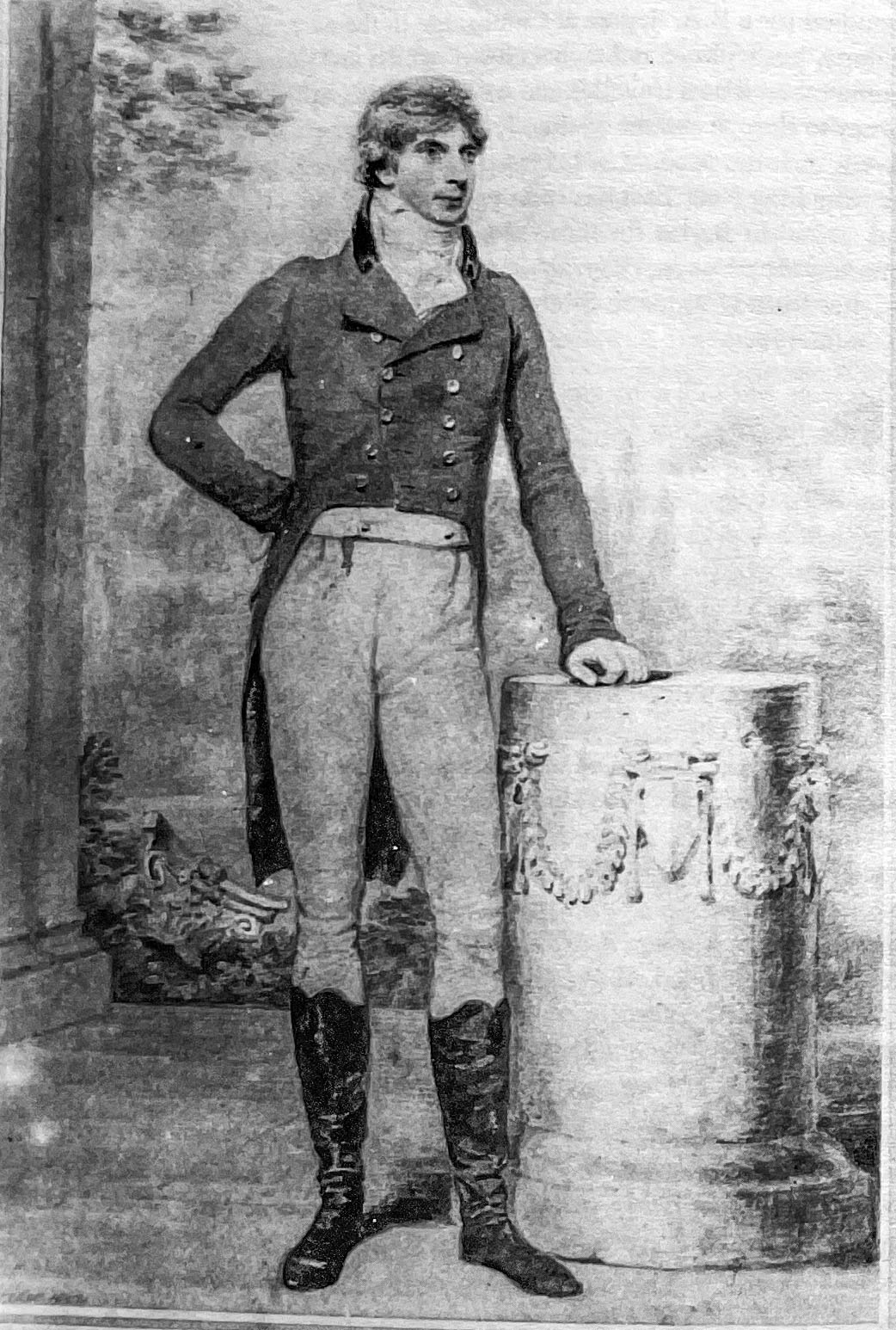
- Portrait by Richard Cosway c1799
- Born: 6 May 1761; Probus, Cornwall, England
- Died: 4 July 1841 (aged 80); Probus, Cornwall, England
- Education: Trinity College, Cambridge
- Scientific career
- Fields: Geology
- Workplaces: RGSC, Geological Society, Royal Society

John Hawkins (6 May 1761 – 4 July 1841) was an English geologist, traveller and writer.

== Life ==
He was the youngest son of Thomas Hawkins of Trewinnard, St Erth, Cornwall, M.P. for Grampound, by Anne, daughter of James Heywood of London. His older brother, Sir Christopher Hawkins, became an MP and mineowner.

He was educated at Helston school, Winchester College, and took his BA from Trinity College, Cambridge, in 1782. He then entered Lincoln's Inn (the family tradition was the practice of law), but decided to travel instead, and in Germany he studied mining and mineralogy.

Hawkins was a man of considerable means, owning much Cornish mining property, and inherited the Trewithen Estate near Probus. He devoted his long life to the study of literature, science, and art. He travelled in Greece, where he purchased stele, and in the Levant, and wrote dissertations 'On the Syrinx of Strabo and the Passage of the Euripus,' ‘On the site of Dodona,' and the like which are printed in Robert Walpole's Memoirs of European and Asiatic Turkey (1818), and Walpole's Travels in various Countries of the East.

In 1806 Hawkins purchased Bignor Park, Sussex, formerly the residence of the poet Charlotte Smith. In 1826–32 he rebuilt the house as a secondary residence more convenient to Westminster than his Cornish estate, and collected a great number of valuable paintings and drawings to add to his antiquities.

Hawkins, who was elected a Fellow of the Royal Society in 1791, wrote a number of papers on scientific subjects, most of them connected with the geology of Cornwall (a full list is given in Boase and Courtney's Bibliotheca Cornubiensis, i. 222, 223, iii. 1224).

He was a founder member of the Royal Horticultural Society, an honorary member of the Geological Society of London, and a founder member of the Royal Geological Society of Cornwall. He contributed papers to the RGSC on the submarine mine at Wherrytown, near Penzance.

Hawkins was a correspondent of Davies Gilbert, Gideon Mantell, Philip Rashleigh and William Gregor, the discoverer of titanium.

In 1826 he served the office of High Sheriff of Sussex; he also served as a magistrate in both Cornwall and Sussex. He died at his seat of Trewithen, Cornwall. He married Hester, daughter of Humphrey Sibthorp, M.P. for Lincoln, and had four sons and two daughters. The eldest, John Heywood Hawkins (1802–1877), was M.P. for Newport, Isle of Wight, from 1833 to 1841, and inherited his Sussex properties, the younger son, Christopher (1820–1903) inheriting the Cornish properties.

== See also ==
- William Gregor
- Phillip Rashleigh
- Martin Klaproth
