= Tybesta =

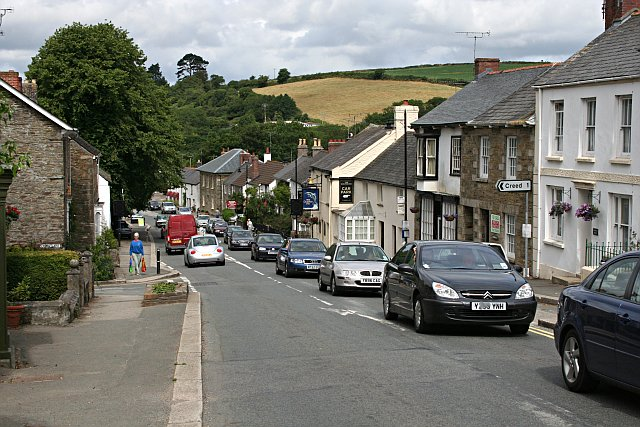
Grampound with Creed was part of the old manor of Tybesta

Tybesta (Tibesteu in the Domesday Book) was a manor located in Cornwall, England, UK. The manor of Tybesta was given by William the Conqueror to his half-brother Robert, Count of Mortain; before the conquest it was held by Ralph the Constable. Tybesta contained all of the parish of Creed; and parts of Probus and Cuby. It was a royal manor and the bailiwick of the hundred of Powder. In 1086 it contained 3 hides and there was land for 30 ploughs. There were 47 households, 40 acres of woodland, pasture 3 leagues long and one league wide, 14 cattle, 4 pigs and 160 sheep. Sections of an ancient castle are still visible and the location where an ancient well is located is probably the area which gave the name to the manor.
