= St Probus and St Grace's Church, Probus =

Coordinates: 50°17′30.2″N 4°57′8.65″W

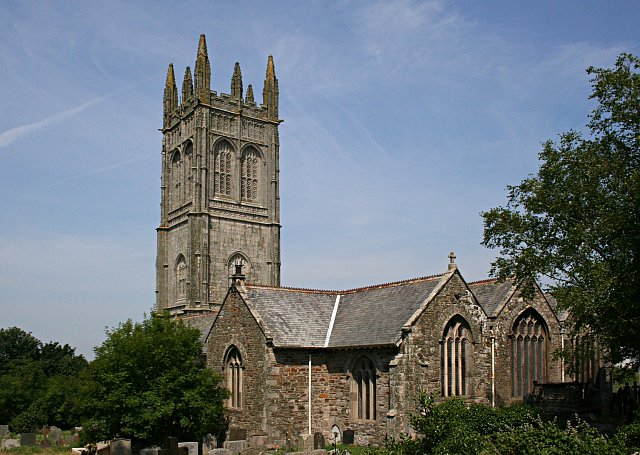
- St Probus and St Grace's Church, Probus
- St Probus and St Grace's Church, Probus
- Location: Probus, Cornwall
- Country: England
- Denomination: Church of England
- Churchmanship: Broad church

History
- Dedication: St Probus (Cornish) and St Grace

Specifications
- Height: 126 feet (38 m)

Administration
- Province: Canterbury
- Diocese: Truro
- Archdeaconry: Cornwall
- Deanery: Powder
- Parish: Probus
- Location within Cornwall

Listed Building – Grade I
- Official name: Church of St Probus
- Designated: 30 May 1967
- Reference no.: 1310352

St Probus and St Grace's Church, Probus, is a Grade I listed parish church in the Church of England Diocese of Truro in Probus, Cornwall. Medieval documents only mention St Probus, who does not seem to be the same as the Cilician martyr St Probus; the dedication to St. Grace is not recorded before the 1850s.

== History ==
There was a monastery here prior to the Norman Conquest of 1066, recorded in a list of Cornish parishes in a Vatican manuscript. This continued to exist until the reign of Henry I. King Henry gave the church of Probus to Exeter Cathedral and the clergy of Probus thereafter were a dean and five canons (the deanery was abolished in 1268 and the canonries in 1549). The first vicar was instituted in 1312; the parish had dependent chapelries at Cornelly and Merther. The church was built mainly in the 15th century but the tower was still under construction in 1523. In the church is the brass of John Wulvedon and his wife, 1512. This tower is the highest among Cornish parish churches and resembles those of Somerset rather than other Cornish towers. The stone was brought from the quarry by the parishioners in their carts led by John Tregian of Golden; however the rival squire Nicholas Carminow of Trenowth (John's brother-in-law) made great efforts to obstruct the work.

The church was restored in 1850 by George Edmund Street. The restoration was prompted by an outbreak of dry rot. The ceilings had been covered at some time with plaster, and the pillars with whitewash. The church was filled with high pews made of deal. The arch into the tower was blocked up with a gallery, shutting out the principal west window. All of these defects were rectified and it reopened on 28 October 1851.

The tower was restored between 1922 and 1923 by J. Dawson and Sons, Steeplejacks.

In the early years of the 19th century the rare custom of turning to the East for the Doxology at the conclusion of the recitation of each Psalm, particularly by those in choir, was observed in Probus church.

== Parish status ==
The church is in a benefice with

- St Crida's Church, Creed
- St Nun's Church, Grampound
- St Ladoca's Church, Ladock
- St Hermes' Church, St Erme

== Organ ==
The organ dates from 1884 and was built by Hele & Co. A specification of the organ can be found on the National Pipe Organ Register.
