= Grampound =

Village in Cornwall, England

Coordinates: 50.298°N 4.8996°W

Grampound: Cornish: Ponsmeur
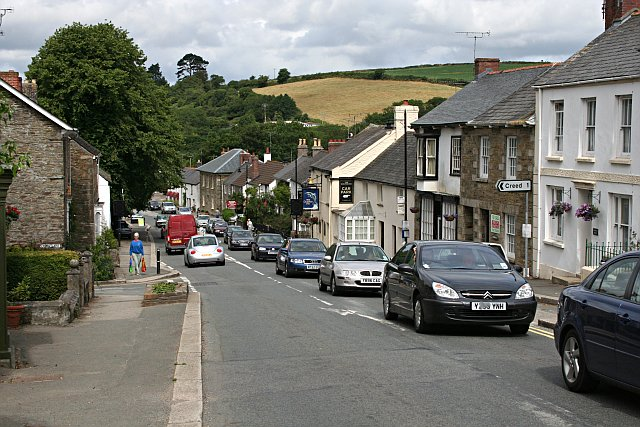
- Fore Street

- Seal of Borough of Grampound

- Location within Cornwall
- Population: 685 (Built up area, 2021)
- OS grid reference: SW9355048349
  - London: 257 mi (414 km)
- Civil parish: Grampound with Creed
- Unitary authority: Cornwall Council
- Ceremonial county: Cornwall
- Region: South West
- Country: England
- Sovereign state: United Kingdom
- Post town: TRURO
- Postcode district: TR2
- Dialling code: 01726
- Police: Devon and Cornwall
- Fire: Cornwall
- Ambulance: South Western
- UK Parliament: St Austell and Newquay
- Website: http://www.grampound-pc.gov.uk/

Grampound (Cornish: Ponsmeur) is a village in the parish of Grampound with Creed, in Cornwall, England. It is at an ancient crossing point of the River Fal 6 miles (10 km) west of St Austell and 8 miles (13 km) east of Truro. At the 2021 census the population of the built up area was 685.

== Toponymy ==
The name Grampound comes from the Norman French: grand (great), pont (bridge), referring to the bridge over the River Fal, with its spelling varying over the last 600 years. The Cornish name Ponsmeur has the same meaning and was first recorded in 1308.

== History ==
The area around Grampound was settled in prehistoric times, and in the early medieval period the parish of Creed and the manor of Tybesta were established here. Grampound grew after the Norman Conquest as the main crossing place on the Fal, a focus for travellers and traders moving between west Cornwall and England. A charter was granted by John of Eltham, Earl of Cornwall, in 1332. The town remained important until the 15th century but then went into decline. John Norden referred to the inhabitants as "few and poore" in his account published in 1584.

The population of the town in 1841 was 607.

Grampound Road railway station opened in 1859 to serve Grampound, but lay some 2 miles (3 km) to the north-west of the village, in the parish of Ladock. A village called Grampound Road subsequently grew up around the station. The station closed in 1964.

== Geography ==
Grampound lies in the valley of the River Fal north of Tregony. It is on the A390 road 10 kilometres (6 mi) west of St Austell and 13 kilometres (8 mi) east of Truro.

Grampound's linear layout is of Norman origin, with long thin burgage plots extending away from the main street, Fore Street (A390). Most of the village core is a Conservation Area, and there are many listed buildings on Fore Street.

== Demography ==
At the 2021 census the population of the Grampound built up area was 685. The population of the parish of Grampound with Creed was 850.

== Transport ==
The A390 runs through the centre of Grampound, in summer when the A30 is congested, the A390 is an alternative route. It is an issue for residents. Pavements in some parts of the village are narrow or non-existent. Traffic speed is an issue through the village. A bypass was considered in 1996, when a route north of the village was favoured, but the plans were rejected, partly due to local protests and partly because Grampound is not large enough to warrant a bypass.

A regular bus service runs to Truro, 8 miles (13 km) to the west, and St Austell, 6 miles (10 km) to the east.

== Governance ==
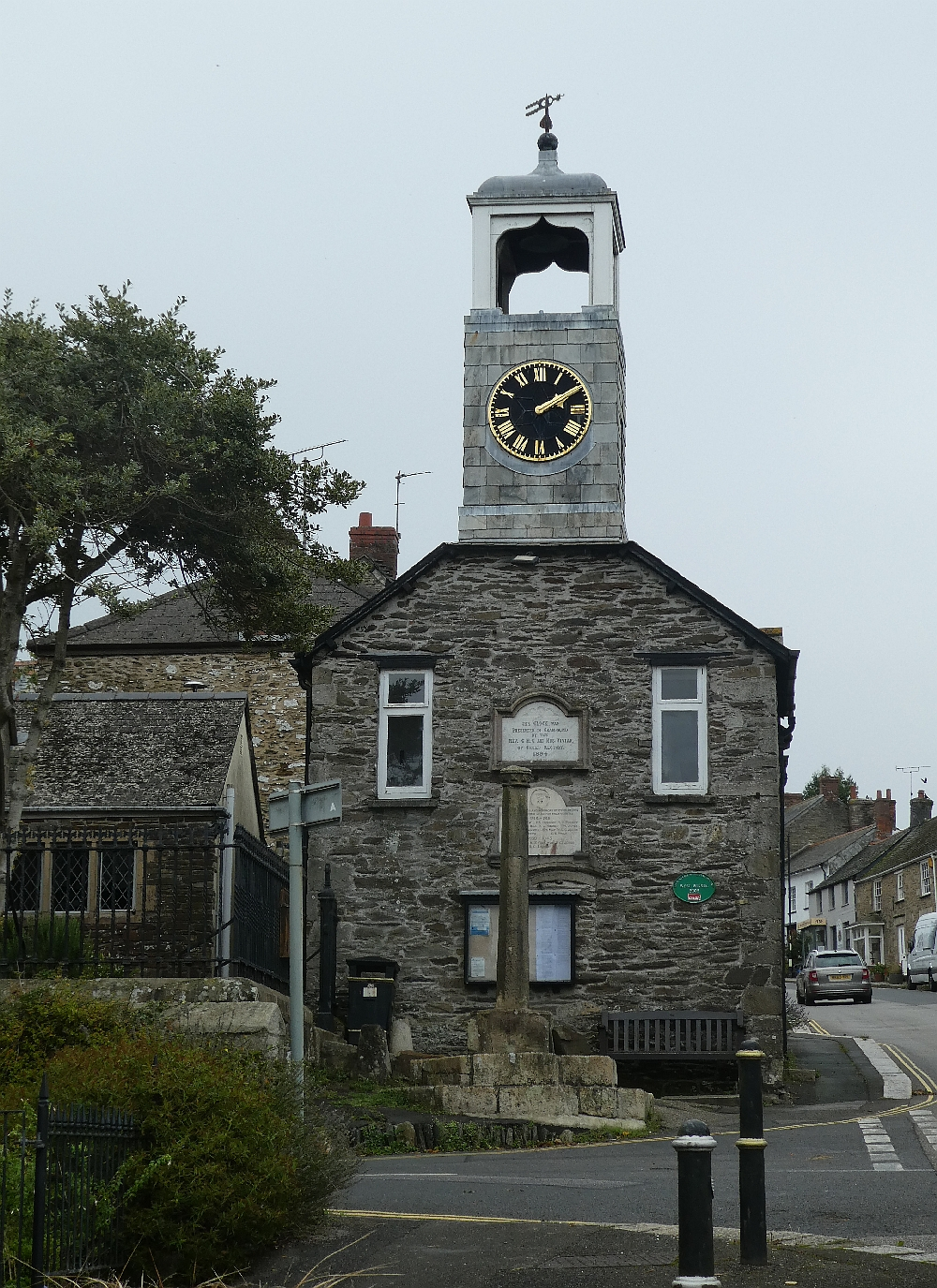
Grampound Town Hall

There are two tiers of local government covering Grampound, at parish and unitary authority level: Grampound with Creed Parish Council and Cornwall Council. The parish council meets at Grampound Town Hall.

For national elections, Grampound forms part of the St Austell and Newquay constituency.

=== Administrative history ===
Grampound historically formed part of the ancient parish of Creed, in the Powder Hundred of Cornwall. Grampound was made a borough in 1332.

The seal of the borough of Grampound was "A bridge of two arches over a river, the dexter end in perspective showing the passage over at the sinister and a tree issuing from the base against the bridge on the centre an escutcheon of the arms of the family of Cornwall viz. Argent a lion rampant Gules within a bordure Sable."

In 1547 the borough was made a constituency for parliamentary elections, as the Grampound parliamentary borough, electing two members of parliament. This was despite the town already being in decline. Grampound was one of several rotten boroughs in Cornwall that were created in the Tudor period. Notable MPs who represented the town included William Noye, John Hampden, Grey Cooper and Charles Wolfran Cornwall. In the late 18th century and early 19th century the constituency became notorious for blatant bribery and corruption in electing its MPs. The small electorate could earn significant money selling their votes; at one election each vote was said to have cost £280. Matters came to a head following the 1818 general election, after which 24 people involved in giving or receiving bribes in the constituency were jailed. The constituency was subsequently abolished by an Act of Parliament in 1821. Its sitting MPs were allowed to retain their seats until the next general election in 1826, when Grampound's two seats were transferred to the under-represented Yorkshire constituency.

Following the abolition of the constituency, the borough corporation went into terminal decline; its main function had come to be managing the parliamentary elections. The mayor in 1821, David Varcoe, left the borough never to return, and the borough's accounts disappeared. A new mayor was not appointed until 1833, but he was the last mayor. No effort was made to exercise any municipal authority after 1835 and so the borough became effectively defunct. Any residual claim Grampound may have had to being a borough was extinguished in 1886 under the Municipal Corporations Act 1883.

Parish functions under the poor laws were administered separately for the area of Grampound borough and the rest of the parish of Creed, a pattern which continued after the borough ceased operating in the 1830s. In 1866, the legal definition of 'parish' was changed to be the areas used for administering the poor laws, and so Grampound became a separate civil parish from Creed. Despite the split of the civil parish, Grampound remained part of the ecclesiastical parish of Creed.

When elected parish and district councils were established under the Local Government Act 1894, Grampound was given a parish council and included in the St Austell Rural District. St Austell Rural District was abolished in 1974 under the Local Government Act 1972, when the area became part of the new borough of Restormel. In 1983 the civil parishes of Creed and Grampound were merged into a new parish called "Grampound with Creed". At the 1971 census (one of the last before the abolition of the parish), Grampound had a population of 401.

Restormel was abolished in 2009. Cornwall County Council then took on district-level functions, making it a unitary authority, and was renamed Cornwall Council.

== Economy ==
There are a number of local businesses including Grampound Village Store, Tremethick Brewery, Tristan Hay Pine and Period furniture, Gould Cider and Perry and The Dolphin Inn.

Many people commute to work in the nearby centres of St Austell and Truro. There are a number of businesses run from home.

The tannery industry was important in the past in Grampound. The principal leather tannery, which closed in 2002, was owned by the Croggon family. It consists of several large buildings and surrounding fields on the southern side of the village. This area is being developed into 55 new homes and office space.

== Culture and community ==
There is an annual carnival on the first Saturday in September which includes a procession along Fore Street (A390) which is closed temporarily. Markets are held in Grampound Hall twice a month on a Saturday. One of these markets is run by Transition Grampound and the other by the village hall committee.

The new village hall was opened in 2004 with National Lottery funding. This hall is also an arts venue and regularly hosts performances of drama, dance, and music. Notable past performances include the Norwegian percussionist Terje Isungset performing ice music in 2012. A local amateur dramatic group, The Grampound Players, has also performed in recent years.

The recreation ground is managed by a charity (Grampound with Creed War Memorial Recreation Ground and Public Hall) in Grampound as a public space. It is host to the carnival each year and also to Grampound Football Club who won support from Sport England's Protecting Playing Fields Olympic legacy for it to be resurfaced.

Grampound Town Hall contains a small museum, the Grampound with Creed Heritage Centre, and hosts a photograph archive online. A plaque was installed in the town hall to recognise Grampound being named Calor Village of the Year for West England 2007/8.

Other landmarks in Grampound include the market cross.

== Education ==
Grampound with Creed Primary School is part of The Rainbow Multi Academy Trust. It has between 40 and 60 pupils. The primary school has recently been extended.

== Religious sites ==
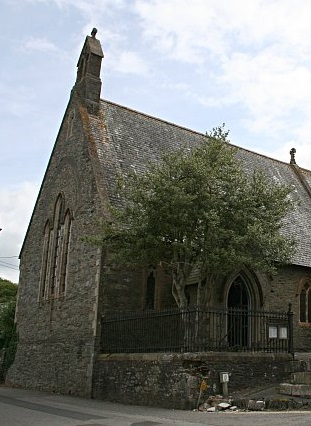
St Nun's Church

The Church of St Nun is the main religious site in Grampound. There is the nearby, older church of St Crida in Creed and they are both managed by the same parochial church council and part of the churches led by the Rector at Probus, Ladock, Grampound with Creed and St.Erme Parishes.

There were a number of chapels in Grampound which have since been converted into dwellings.

== Sport ==
Grampound is home to Grampound Football Club and Grampound Bowling Club both of whom have facilities at the recreation ground.

=== Cornish wrestling ===
Cornish wrestling tournaments, for prizes, have been held in Grampound in the 1800s and 1900s, including at the Football Club.

== Notable people ==
One of Grampound's most famous residents was John Hampden, (1595–1643), a politician representing Grampound in 1621 who later, in 1642, was one of the Five Members whose attempted unconstitutional arrest by King Charles I in the House of Commons of England in 1642 sparked the Civil War. Other parliamentarians include William Noy, (1577–1634), a noted British jurist and MP for Grampound 1603–1614, and Charles Wolfran Cornwall (1735–1789), MP for Grampound 1768–1774, and Grey Cooper (c.1726–1801), MP for Grampound 1768–1774 and Benjamin Hobhouse (1757–1831), MP for Grampound, 1802-1806.

John Crewes (1847–1925), a New Zealand Bible Christian minister and the Scottish sculptor Pilkington Jackson (1887–1973), were born here.

== See also ==
- Grampound (UK Parliament constituency) (1553–1821)
- Tybesta
