= Trewithen House =

Historic building in Cornwall, England

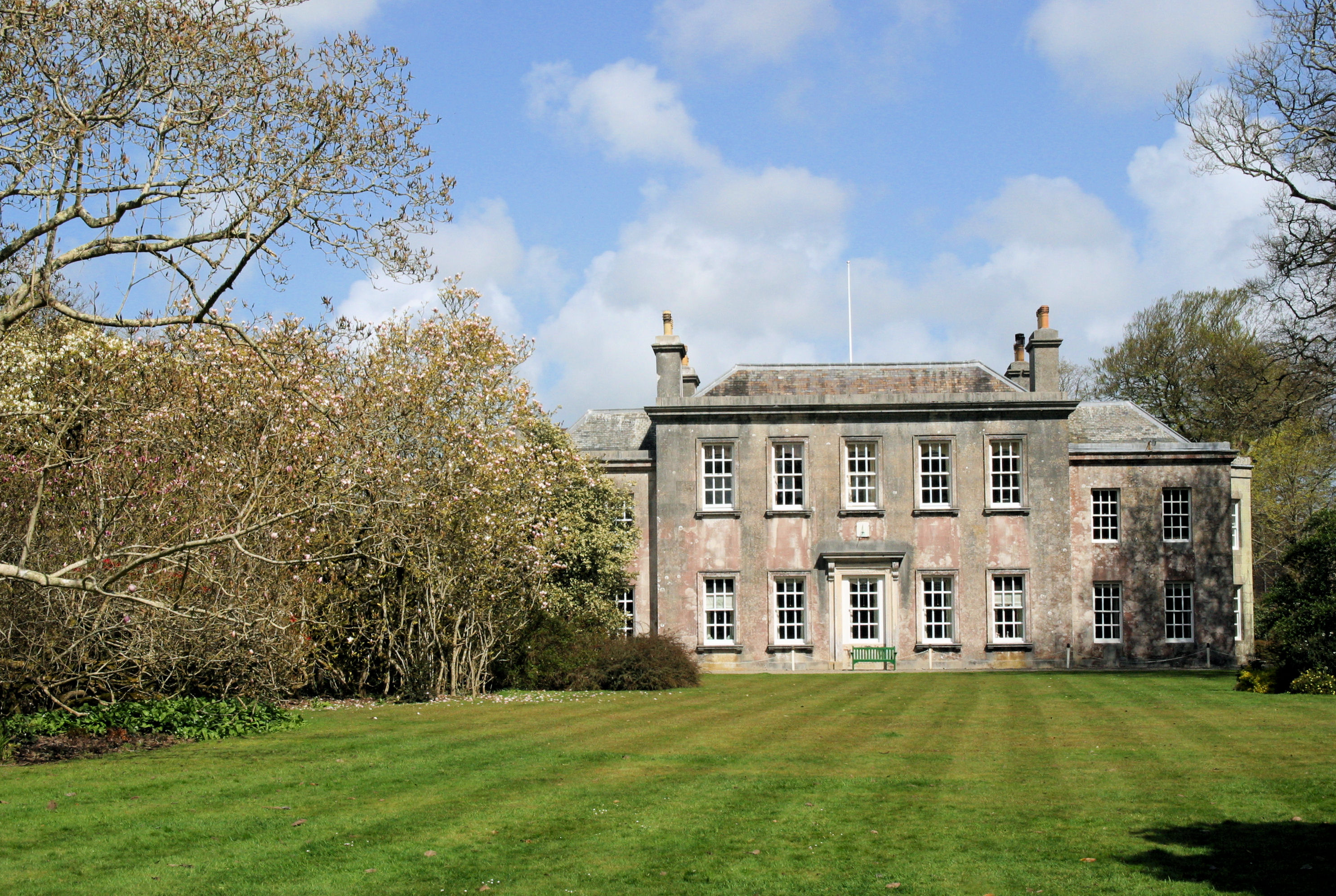
- Western façade

- Location within Cornwall
- 50.29058°N 4.93118°W
- Location: Probus, Cornwall, England

History
- Built: 1723

Site notes
- Architect: Thomas Edwards

Listed Building – Grade I
- Official name: Trewithen House
- Designated: 20 February 1956
- Reference no.: 1141100

National Register of Historic Parks and Gardens
- Official name: Trewithen
- Designated: 11 June 1987
- Reference no.: 1000510

Trewithen House is a Georgian country house in Probus, Cornwall, England. The Palladian house was built by London-based architect Thomas Edwards in 1723. The house is listed Grade I on the National Heritage List for England, and its gardens are Grade II* listed on the Register of Historic Parks and Gardens.

== History ==
Wealthy landowner and lawyer Phillip Hawkins purchased the estate in 1715. He ordered London-based architect Thomas Edwards to build the Palladian house in 1723. It was later revised by Edwards in around 1738 and by Sir Robert Taylor in the 1750-1760s.

== Architecture ==
The house is built from granite ashlar, Pentewan stone ashlar and stucco, and features hipped slate roofs and rendered stacks. The central doorcase is arched with a pulvinated frieze, and contains an 18th-century central panelled door with sidelights.

In the interior, the central east room of the house is panelled with pine wood, while the central south room features arcaded screens and Roman-style Ionic entablatures, with rococo arabesques adorning the fireplace wall. The main staircase of Trewithen House is cantilevered, and set in a semi circular open well.

== Grounds ==
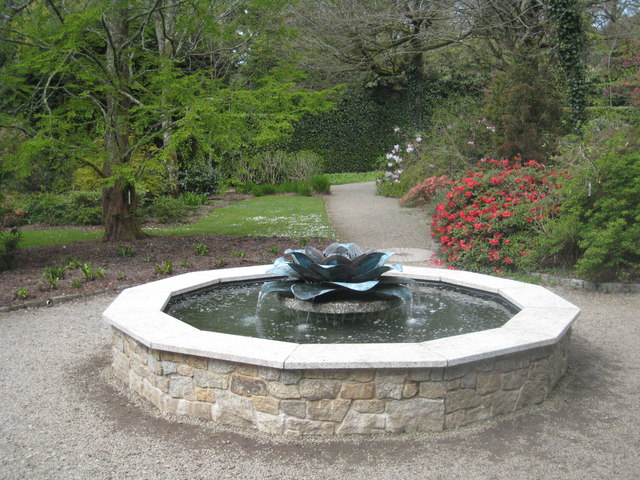
The magnolia fountain

The grounds of Trewithen Estate are noteworthy, with a prominent 200 yard-long lawn and gardens containing some rare plants. The two garden pavilions located 15 meters to the north east and the north west of the house are Grade I listed.

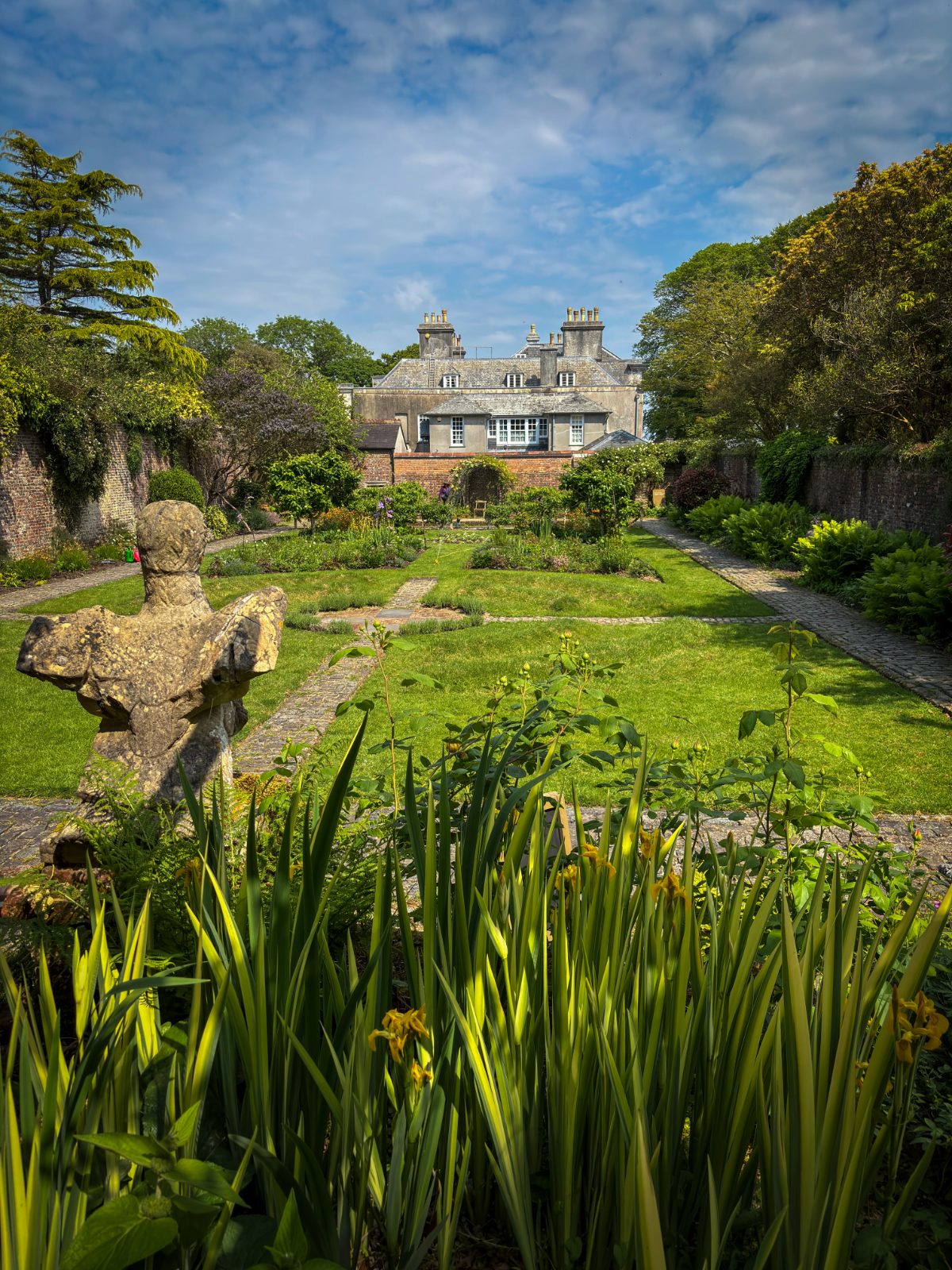
The Walled Garden

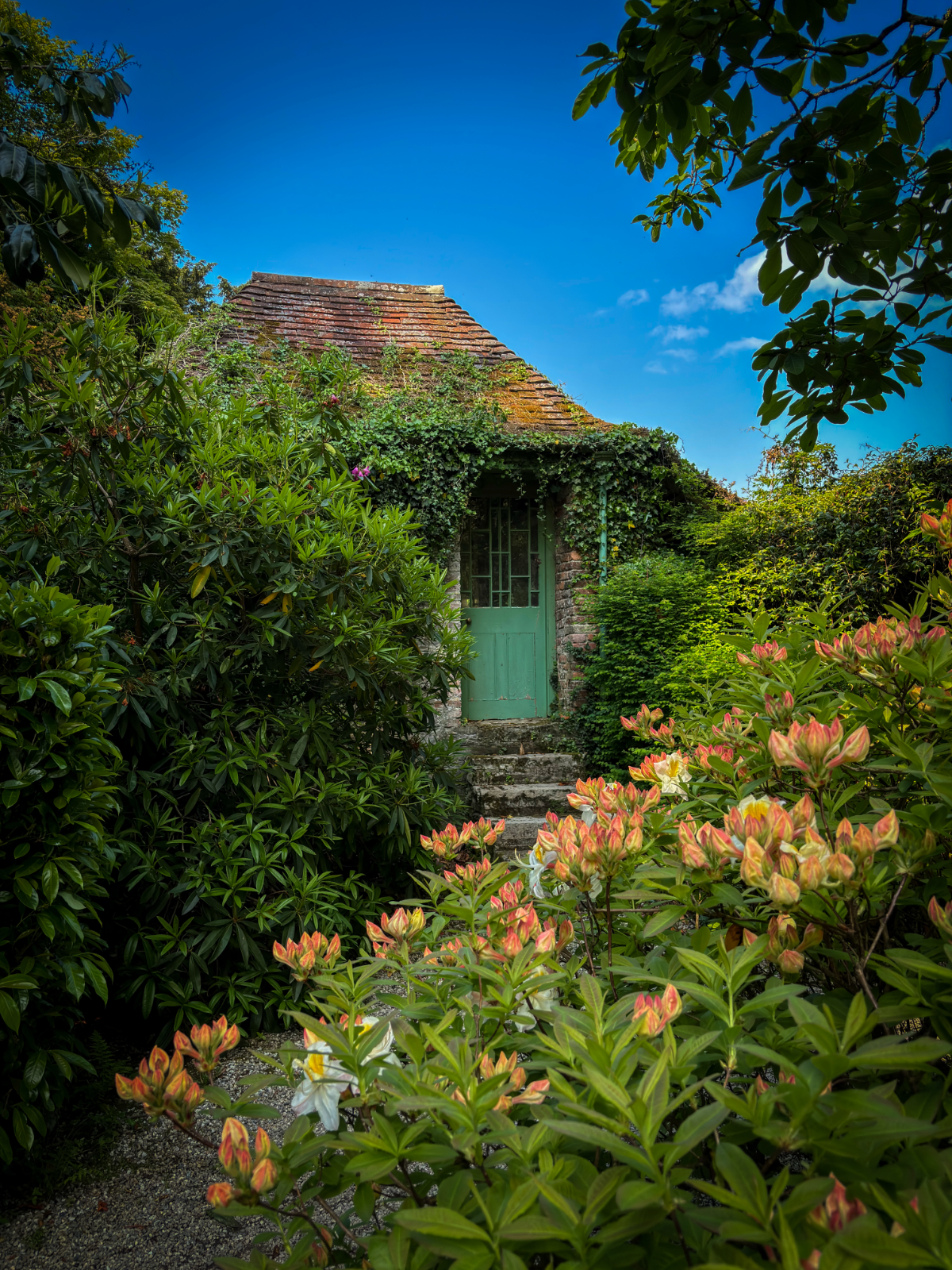
A garden shed at Trewithen

The entrance gates and piers 500 meters to the north east and the north west of the house are Grade II listed, as are the gates with piers to the north east and north west of the house. The kitchen garden walls adjoining the service wing to the west of the house are Grade II listed.
