= St Crida's Church, Creed =

St Crida’s Church, Creed
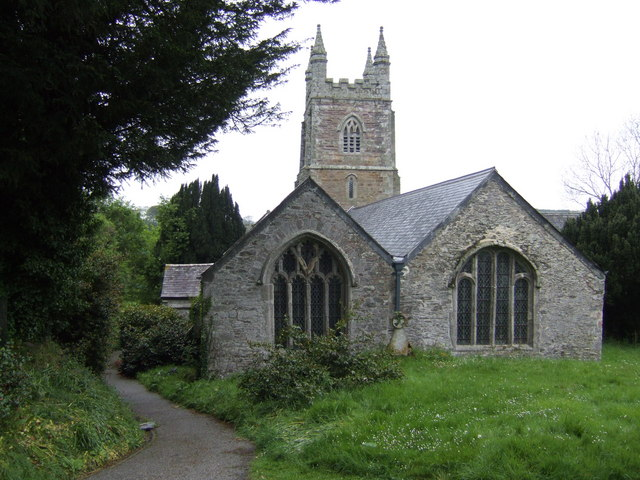
- St Crida’s Church, Creed
- St Crida’s Church, Creed
- 50°17′18.13″N 4°53′59.37″W
- Location: Creed, Cornwall
- Country: England
- Denomination: Church of England

History
- Dedication: St Crida

Administration
- Province: Province of Canterbury
- Diocese: Diocese of Truro
- Archdeaconry: Cornwall
- Deanery: Powder
- Parish: Creed
- Location within Cornwall

Listed Building – Grade I
- Official name: Church of St Crida
- Designated: 10 February 1967
- Reference no.: 1136281

St Crida's Church, Creed is a Grade I listed parish church in the Church of England Diocese of Truro in Creed, Cornwall, England, UK.

== History ==
The church of St Crida was of Norman foundation but in its existing form is more or less of the 15th century (the tower which had already been built in 1447 however was rebuilt in 1734). Between 1869 and 1906 the church was unused. It has a tower of three stages, a fine south aisle and a south porch. Parts of the old woodwork have been preserved. By 1291 the church was cruciform; of this the north transept and some masonry in the north wall remain. In the mid 15th century the south transept was replaced by an ambitious south aisle, with lavish windows, and an unusually rich south porch. Features of interest include the 15th century wagon roof of the south aisle, a Norman pillar piscina, the 13th century Catacleuse stone font, and the chest tomb of Thomas and Margaret Denys (died 1589 & 1578).

Little is known of St Crida to whom the church is dedicated except that she was a woman. Peter Berresford Ellis suggested that she could be associated with Crediton and could be the same as St Grada.

William Gregor, the discoverer of titanium, was rector here. Dr Reginald Merther-derwa was Rector 1423–47; his will provided for the erection of a series of stone crosses at Camborne. The five similar stone crosses in Creed parish, including one now at Grampound church, may also have been due to him.

== Parish status ==
The church is in a joint parish with

- St Nun's Church, Grampound
- St Ladoca's Church, Ladock
- St Probus and St Grace's Church, Probus
- St Hermes' Church, St Erme

== Organ ==
The church had an organ by William Hill, but this has been replaced by an organ by William Sweetland from Carnkie Methodist Church. A specification of the organ can be found on the National Pipe Organ Register.
