= William Tresawna =

English cricketer

Personal information
- Full name: William Samson Tresawna
- Born: 14 April 1880; Probus, Cornwall, England
- Died: 21 August 1945 (aged 65); Abergavenny, Monmouthshire, Wales
- Batting: Right-handed

Domestic team information
- Years: Team
- 1919: HK Foster's XI
- 1898–1913: Cornwall

Career statistics
Competition	First-class
Matches	1
Runs scored	76
Batting average	38.00
100s/50s	–/1
Top score	55
Catches/stumpings	–/–
- Source: Cricinfo, 14 February 2011

William Samson Tresawna (14 April 1880 – 21 August 1945) was a Cornish cricketer. Tresawna was a right-handed batsman. He was born in Probus, Cornwall.

Tresawna first played for Cornwall in the 1898 Minor Counties Championship against Glamorgan. From 1880 to 1913, he played infrequently for Cornwall, representing them in just 18 Championship matches. He played his final Championship match against Monmouthshire. Tresawna later made a single first-class appearance for HK Foster's XI against the Australian Imperial Forces in 1919 at the Racecourse Ground, Hereford. In the HK Foster's XI first-innings he scored 55 runs before being dismissed by William Trenerry and in their second-innings he was run out for 21.

He died in Abergavenny, Monmouthshire on 21 August 1945.
