= Grampound Town Hall =

Municipal building in Grampound, Cornwall, England

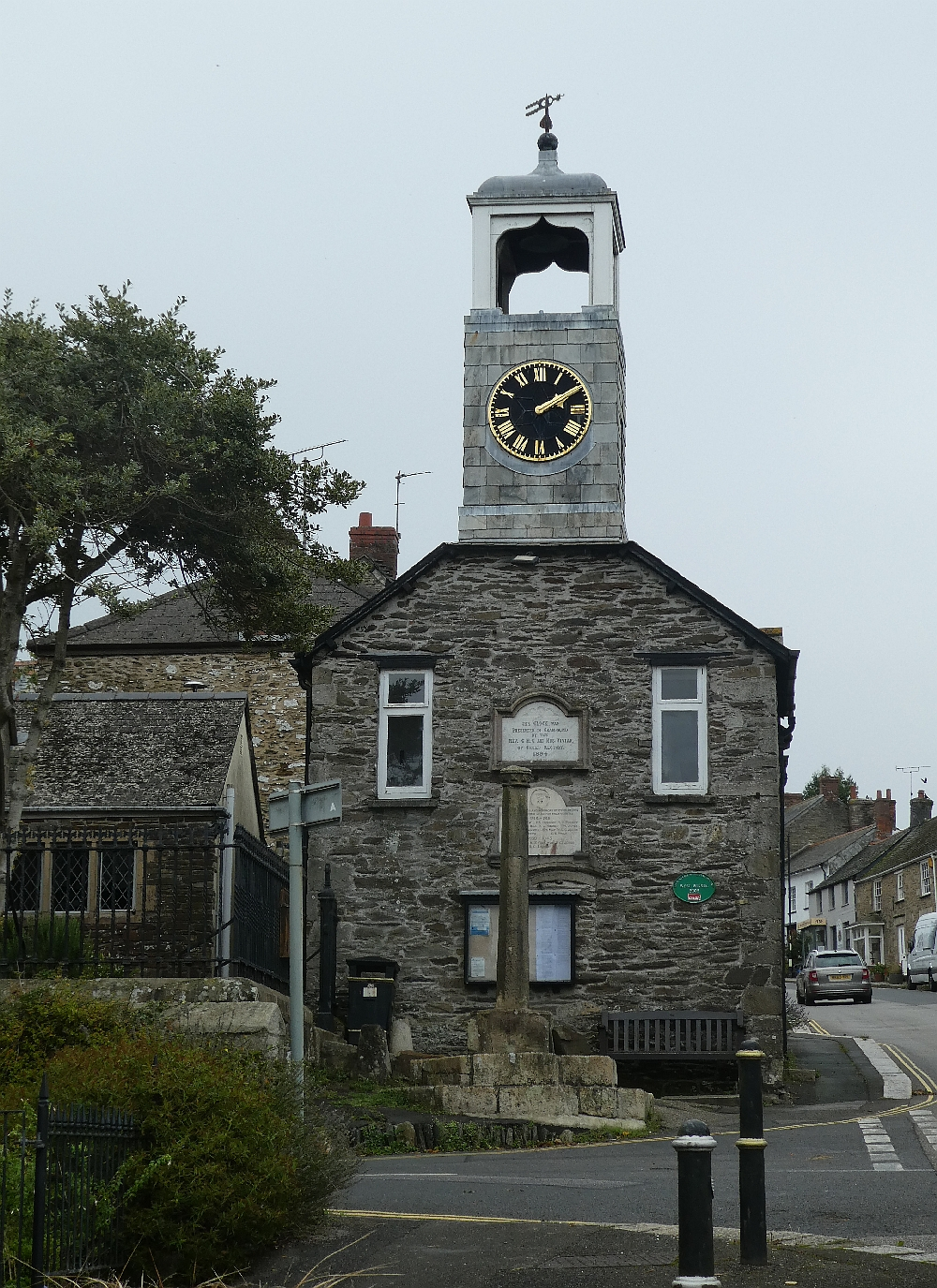
- Grampound Town Hall

- Shown in Cornwall
- 50°17′54″N 4°53′59″W
- Location: Fore Street, Grampound, Cornwall, England

History
- Built: 1614 (reconstructed early 18th century)

Site notes
- Architectural style: Neoclassical style

Listed Building – Grade II
- Official name: Town Hall and Clock Tower
- Designated: 7 January 1952
- Reference no.: 1144042

Grampound Town Hall is a municipal building in Fore Street, Grampound, Cornwall, England. The structure, which now accommodates a heritage centre, is a Grade II listed building.

== History ==
The town hall was designed in the neoclassical style, built in rubble masonry and, in its earliest form, dates to 1614. It was originally open on the ground floor, so markets could be held, with four large pillars supporting the assembly room on the first floor. Although elements of the original structure have survived, including the 17th century ceiling in the assembly room, the building was substantially reconstructed in the early 18th century,

A school was established in the town hall by the Buller family of Morval House in the late 18th century. The right of the borough council to elect members of parliament was removed, due to widespread corruption, in 1821, and the borough council, which had not met for many years, was abolished under the Municipal Corporations Act 1883.

The building was reconstructed again, with the ground floor becoming fully enclosed, in 1894. The design then involved an asymmetrical main frontage of four bays facing onto Fore Street. The end bays contained doorways with timber lintels, while the two central bays were fenestrated with cross windows on both floors with small gables above. A small clock tower, faced in slate and surmounted by a cupola and a weather vane, was installed at the left-hand end of the building. The clock was designed and manufactured by J. Smith and Sons at the Midland Steam Clock Works in Derby and presented to the parish by the Rev. Charles Henry Gerald Vivian of Creed Rectory. The assembly room subsequently became the meeting place of Grampound with Creed Parish Council.

A stone plaque, intended to commemorate the lives of local service personnel who had died in the First World War, was installed on the west end of the town hall in the 1920s, and an oval-shaped green plaque was installed on the west end of the town hall to recognise Grampound being named Calor Village of the Year for West England in 2007/8.

A small museum, the Grampound with Creed Heritage Centre, was established in the town hall in 2008. Artefacts accessioned included the old council minute books, as well as a series of photographs, with online access provided. The southeast corner of the town hall was badly damaged when it was hit by a car in December 2022. The building was subsequently repaired with matching stone work and re-opened in March 2024.
