= Probus, Cornwall =

Village in Cornwall, England

Coordinates: 50°17′N 4°57′W

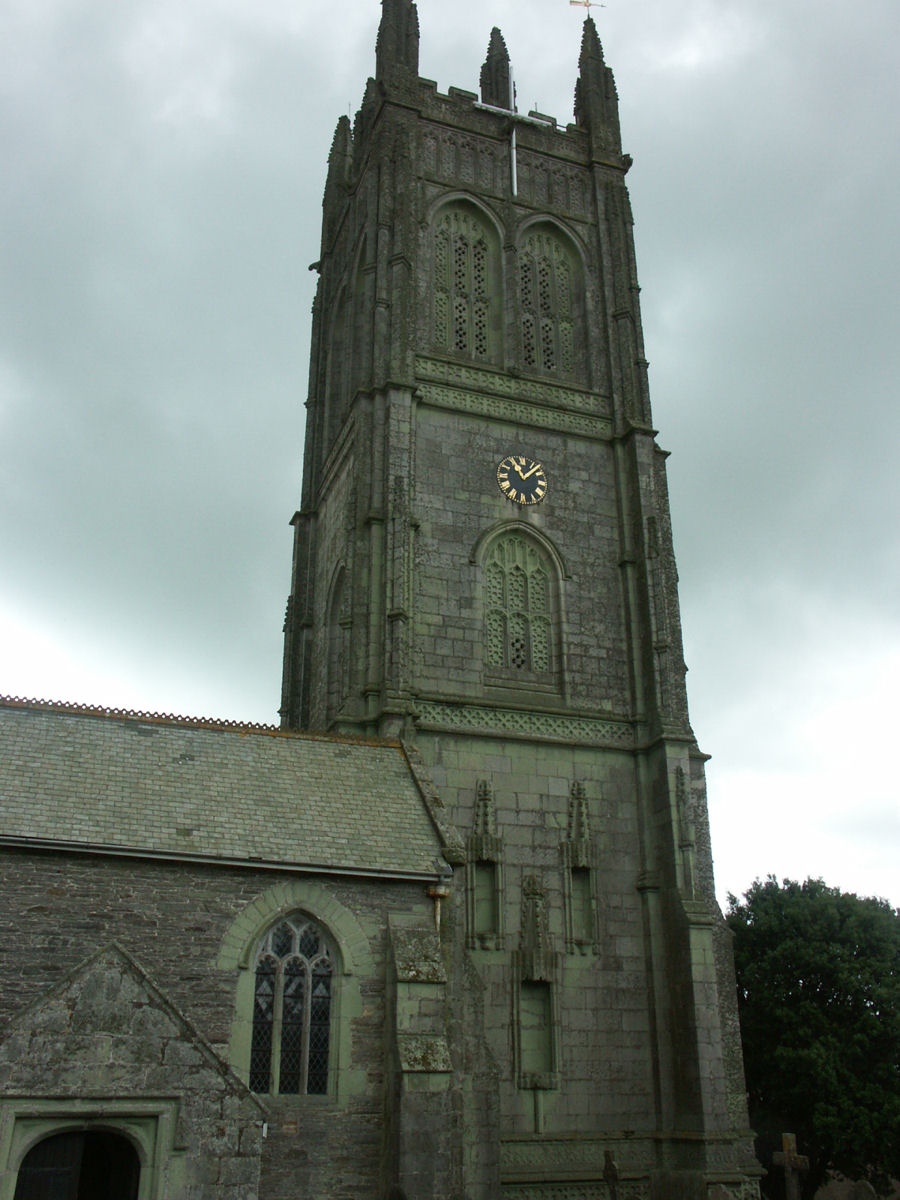
St Probus and St Grace's Church, Probus

Probus (Cornish: Lannbrobus) is a civil parish and village in Cornwall, England, in the United Kingdom. It has the tallest church tower in Cornwall. The tower is 129 feet (39 m) high, and richly decorated with carvings. The place name originates from the church's dedication to an obscure Saint Probus. The parish population at the 2011 census was 2,299, whereas the ward population taken at the same census was 3,953.

== History ==
There was a monastery here before the Norman Conquest which continued to exist until the reign of Henry I. King Henry gave the church of Probus to Exeter Cathedral and the clergy of Probus thereafter were a dean and five canons (the deanery was abolished in 1268 and the canonries in 1549). The first vicar was instituted in 1312; the parish had dependent chapelries at Cornelly and Merther. The church was built mainly in the 15th century but the tower was still under construction in 1523. In the church is the brass of John Wulvedon and his wife, 1512. In the early years of the 19th century the rare custom of turning to the East for the Doxology at the conclusion of the recitation of each Psalm, particularly by those in choir, was observed in Probus church.

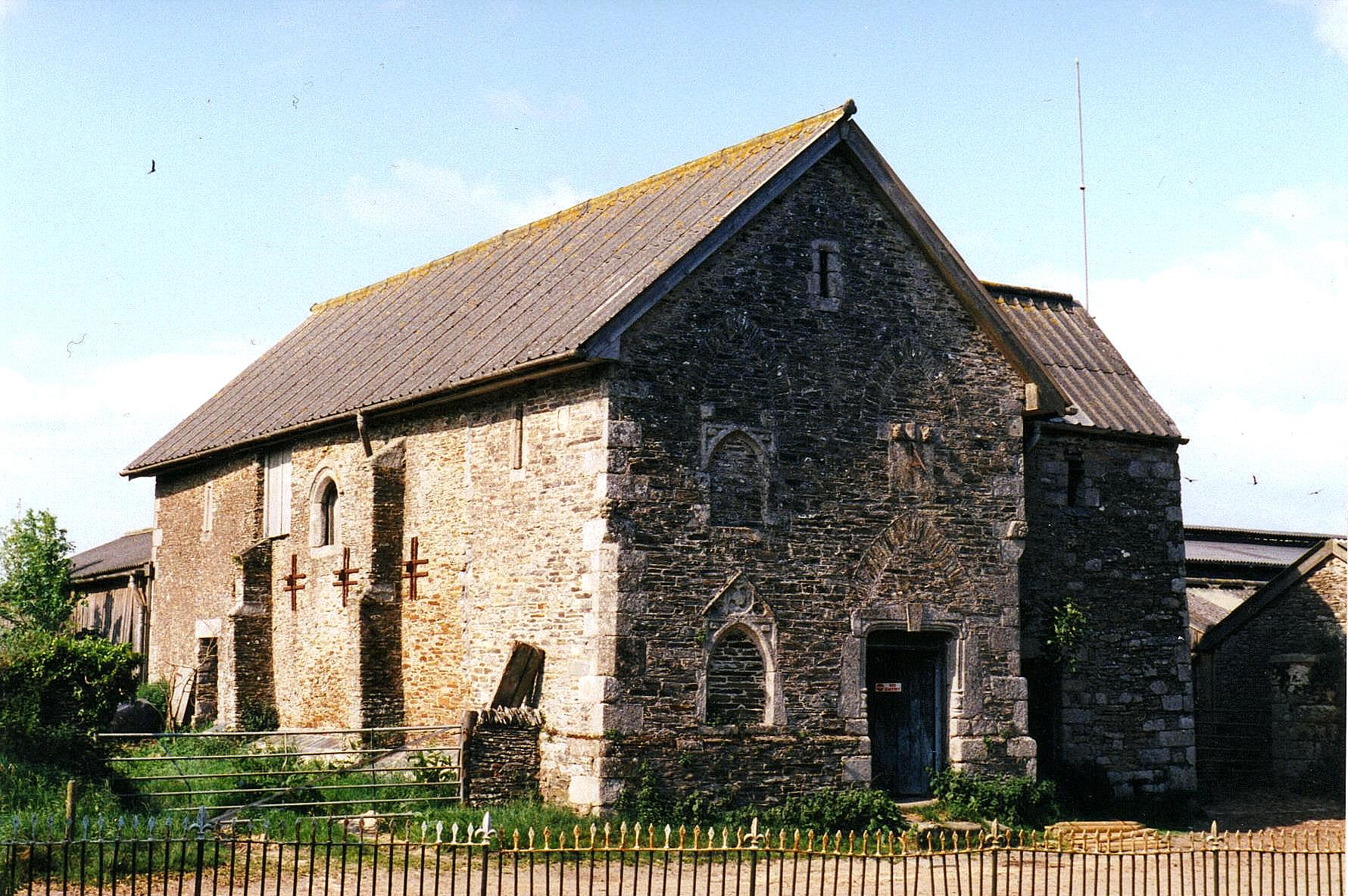
The barn at Golden Manor, a former secret chapel

There are records of no less than nine medieval chapels in the parish and three more of which traditions exist. Two mansions formerly existed at Golden: one of the Wolvedon family and a larger one of the Tregians. The line of Wolvedons became extinct in 1514. At the Tregian mansion the Catholic martyr Cuthbert Mayne was arrested in June 1577. The farmhouse at Golden contains the remains of a hall-house of the late 1530s, reconstructed about a century later, and extended in the 18th century. There is also a fine barn with original roof timbers and a first floor window. The barn is of 15th-16th century date and was partly rebuilt in 1879. Trewithen House was built in 1723.

Trelowthas Cross was found in the 1940s at Trelowthas. Great Trelowthas was the site of one of the medieval chapels in the parish, recorded as licensed in 1379. Probus was one of four places in Cornwall having a right of sanctuary which extended beyond the walls of the church, the others being Padstow, St Keverne and St Buryan. The missing Carvossa cross is thought to have marked the eastern limit of sanctuary and it is likely that this cross marked the western limit.

An annual market and fair was held here from 1321.

== Education ==
Probus has one school, a primary one.

== Geography and wildlife ==
Trehane Barton is the former home of the Stackhouse family and a Site of Special Scientific Interest. When the SSSI was notified in 1989 the barns supported the largest known breeding colony of Greater Horseshoe Bat in Cornwall and one of only eleven known colonies in Britain. No bats were present during a visit in October 2010 to access the site which was given an "unfavourable no change" condition.

== Transport ==
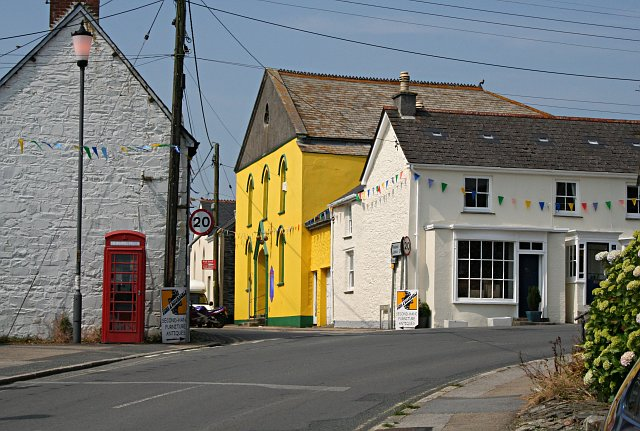
Disused Methodist Church (coloured yellow)

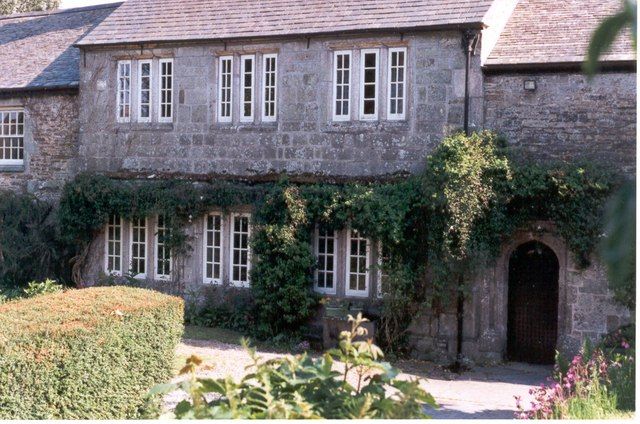
Golden Manor House

Probus lies very close to the Cornish Main Line railway and was formerly served by the Probus and Ladock halt. It is also situated off the A390 road. Probus is served by local bus services between Truro, St Mawes and St Austell, provided on behalf of Transport for Cornwall by Go Cornwall Bus and formerly Western Greyhound (before the company became defunct in March 2015), and also by National Express providing links to further destinations.

== Culture ==
The Hawkins Arms, a St Austell Brewery house, is an 18th-century pub located on Fore Street. The Comrades Club is a members' club situated on The Square.

The Probus Parish Players, formed in 1991, holds an annual pantomime in the Village Hall.

Probus has a Probus Club, the Probus Club of Probus, Probus.

=== County Demonstration Garden ===
The County Demonstration Garden and Arboretum (six and a half acres) formerly belonged to the Trewithen estate. It was established by the County Horticultural Adviser to show what can be done in a small Cornish garden. There were a variety of gardens: for acid and limey soils, labour-saving gardens, patio gardens, shrubs for walls and plots for fruit and vegetables. Another part of the site had plants which originated in Cornish gardens such as Camellia 'J. C. Williams' and Ceanothus 'Trewithen Blue' and a series of plants arranged chronologically by date of introduction. The Garden closed in 2004 and the land used for a garden centre development.

== Sports and recreation ==
Probus has a King George's Field, a memorial to King George V.

=== Cornish wrestling ===
There have been Cornish wrestling tournaments for prizes held in Probus throughout at least the last 300 years. Tournaments have been held in a field adjoining the Cornish Mount Inn, the Green and at Probus College grounds.

Absalom Bennetts from Probus is described as having won well over 42 gold laced hats during the 18th century. He also won the Probus tournament seven years running.

== Notable residents ==
- Francis Tregian the Elder (1548–1608), a Cornish recusant and landowner in Cornwall.
- Francis Tregian the Younger (c. 1574–1618), English recusant, said to be the copyist of the Fitzwilliam Virginal Book
- John Stackhouse (1742–1819), botanist, interested in spermatophytes, algae and mycology.
- John Hawkins (1761–1841), geologist, traveller and writer.
- Joseph Charles Brennan (1818–1872), Bombardier in the Royal Artillery, recipient of the Victoria Cross
- William Tresawna (1880–1945), cricketer, he played 18 games for Cornwall County Cricket Club
