= Elvan =

Volcanic rocks in Cornwall and Devon, England

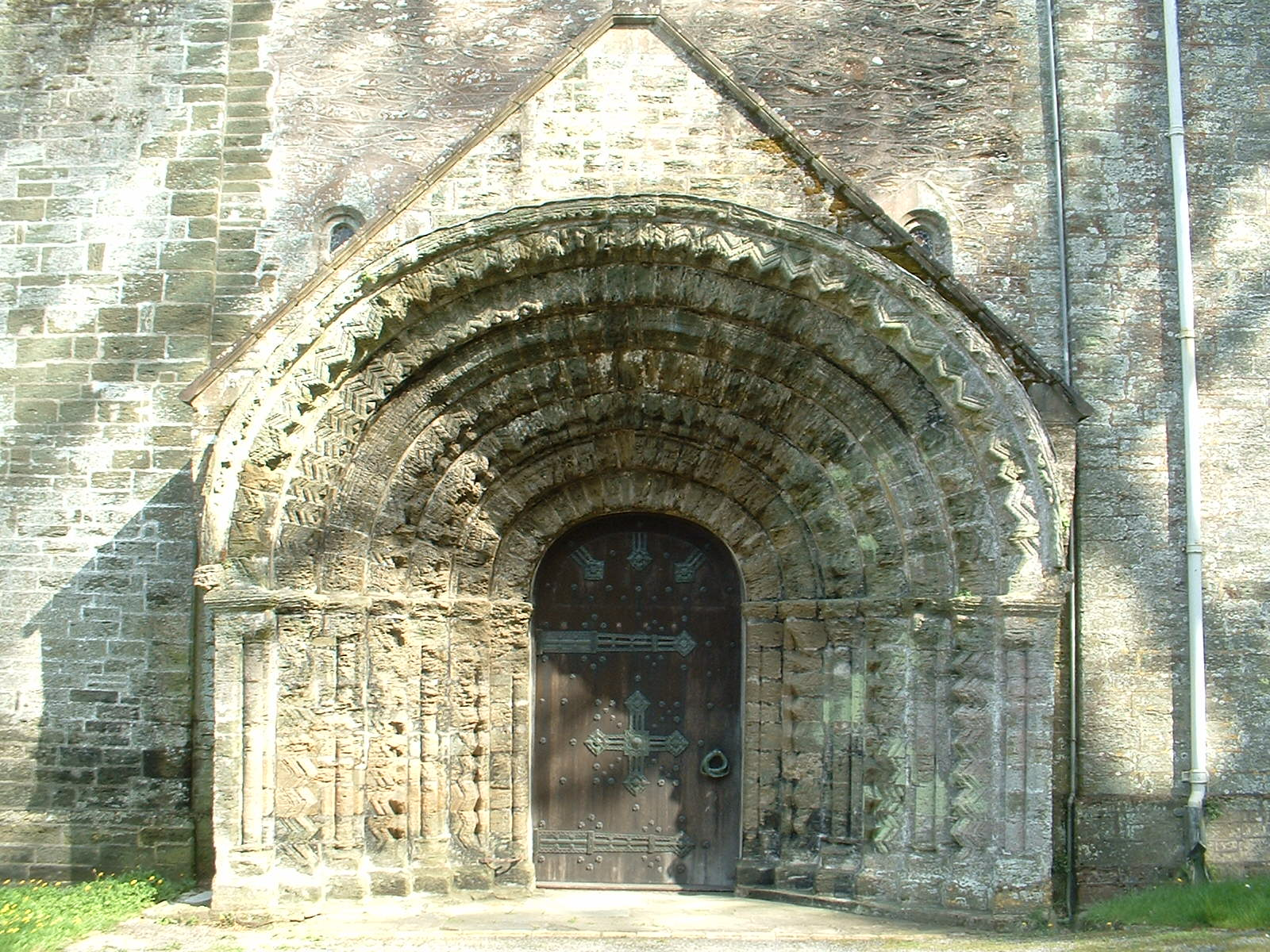
West doorway at St German's Church; built of Tartan Down stone (Landrake)

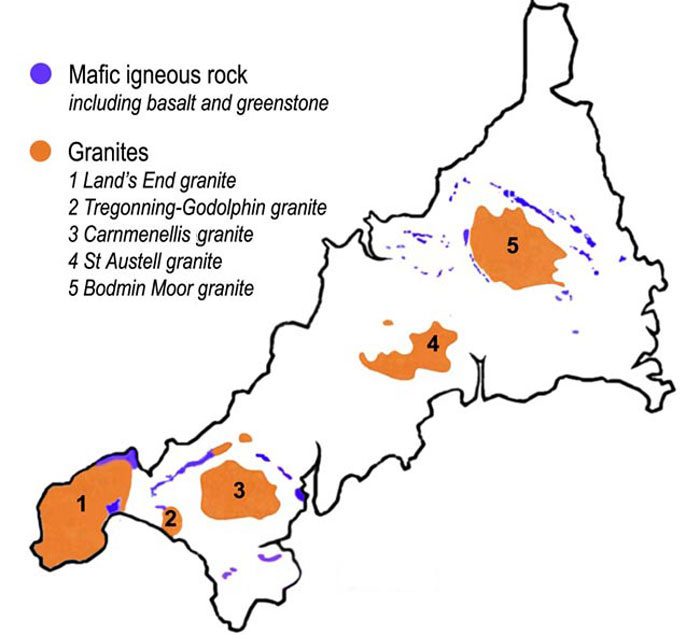
A simplified map showing the granite batholiths and mafic igneous rocks of Cornwall

Elvan (Cornish: elven, lit. 'spark') is a name used in Cornwall and Devon for the native varieties of quartz-porphyry. They are dispersed irregularly in the Devonian series of rocks and some of them make very fine building stones (e.g. Pentewan stone, Polyphant stone and Catacleuse stone). Greenstone is another name for this stone and it is often used for parts of buildings such as doorways so they can be finely carved. Most of the elvan quarries are now disused. Others are quarried in bulk for aggregates commonly used for road-building.

More precisely there are two types of rock in this category: one is "white elvan" and the other is "blue elvan". "White elvans" are a group of fine-grained, acid igneous rocks, while "blue elvans" or "greenstones" are various unusual basic igneous rocks. "White elvan" comes from various different locations and is often known as Pentewan stone (or by other names based on the location). Some older descriptions of building stones have called "white elvans" limestone, e.g. in studies of Lemon Street, Truro.

== Archaeology ==
Approximately 400 prehistoric stone axes, known as Group 1 axes and made from greenstone, have been found all over Britain, which from petrological analysis appear to come from west Cornwall. Although the quarry has not been identified, it has been suggested that the Gear (grid reference SW479293), a rock now submerged half a mile from the shore at Penzance, may be the site. A significant amount of trade is indicated as many have been found elsewhere in Britain.

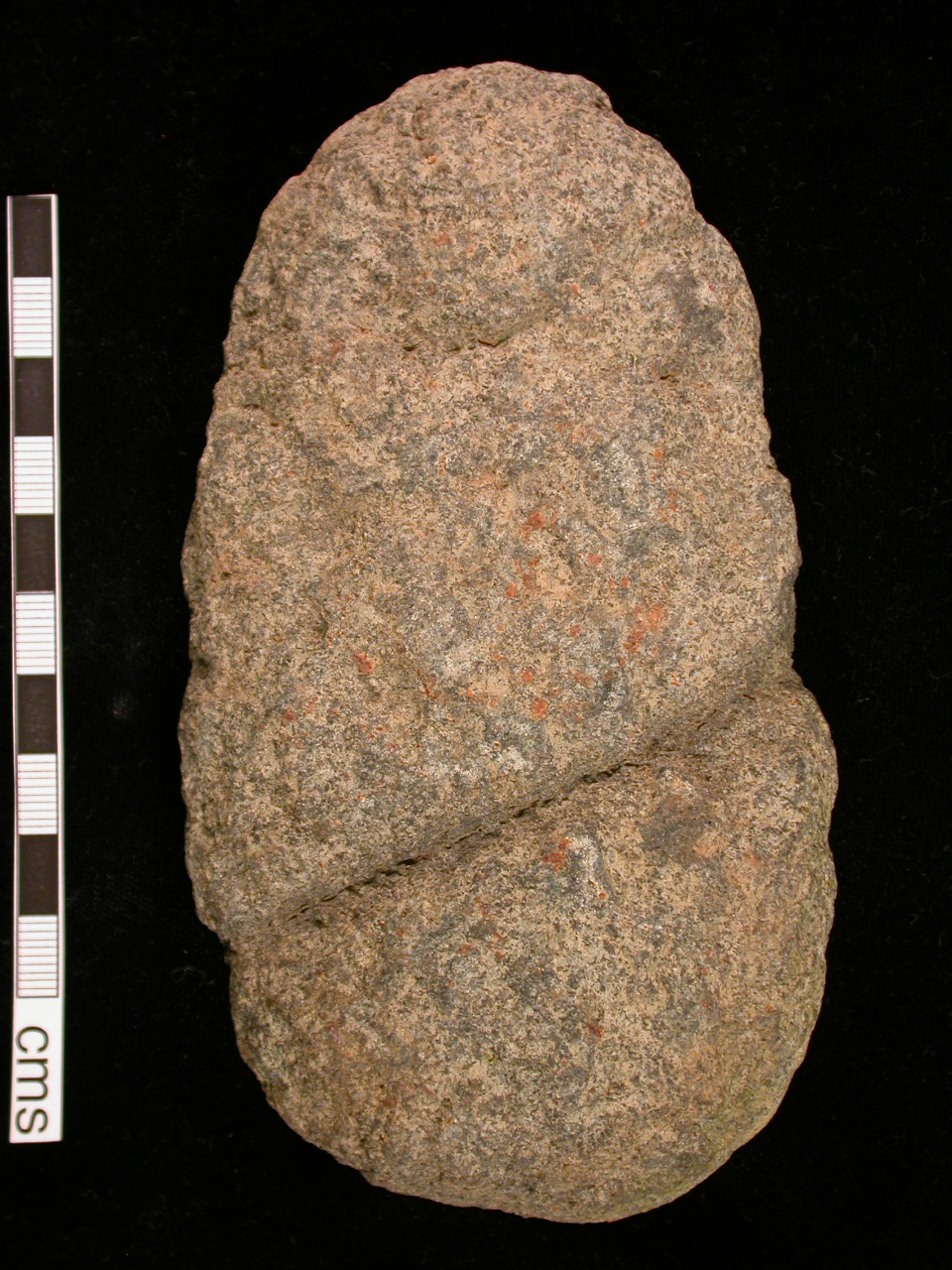
A Neolithic greenstone axe
