= List of places in Cornwall =

Some of the larger settlements of Cornwall.

This is a list of towns and villages in the ceremonial county of Cornwall, United Kingdom. The ceremonial county includes the unitary authorities of Cornwall and the Isles of Scilly.

In accordance with gazetteers, Cornish names are in the standard written form approved by the Maga signage panel.

For the civil parishes which often share the name of a village, see Civil parishes in Cornwall.

== A ==
Image	Name	Cornish name	Status	Population	District	Parish council	Refs
	Addington		Suburban area		East Cornwall	Liskeard Town Council	
	Albaston	Trevalba	Hamlet			Calstock Parish Council	
	Advent	Adwenn	Settlement		North Cornwall	Advent Parish Council	
	Allet	Ales					
	Altarnun	Alternonn	Village			Altarnun Parish Council	
	Alverton	Trevalvar					
	Amalebra	Amallebri	Hamlet			Towednack Parish Council	
	Amalveor	Amalveur	Hamlet			Towednack Parish Council	
	Anderton	Iswoon	Settlement			Maker-with-Rame Parish Council	
	Angarrack	An Garrek	Village			Gwinear-Gwithian Parish Council	
	Angarrick	An Garrek	Hamlet			Mylor Parish Council	
	Antony	Anton	Village			Antony Parish Council	
	Antony Passage	Trethanton	Hamlet				
	Arwenack	Arwynnek					
	Ashill		Hamlet				
	Ashton	Trevonnen	Village			Breage Parish Council	

== B ==
Image	Name	Cornish name	Status	Population	District	Parish council	Refs
	Badgall	Bosgalla					
	Badharlick	Bos Harlek					
	Bake						
	Bakesdown						
	Baldhu	Baldu					
	Ball						
	Balwest						
	Bangors	Banngors					
	Barcelona	Krowsfordh Trevelowen					
	Bareppa						
	Barkla Shop						
	Barripper	Argelteg					
	Bathpool	Pollbadh					
	Beacon	Tanses					
	Bealbury						
	Bealsmill	Melin Bila					
	Beeny	Bydhyni					
	Belowda	Boslowsa					
	Bennacott	Bosvynna					
	Berepper	Argelteg					
	Berriowbridge						
	Bethany						
	Bethel	Bethel					
	Bilberry	Karvyli					
	Billacott						
	Biscovey	Boskenvay					
	Bishop's Quay						
	Bissoe	Besow					
	Bissom	Musyn					
	Black Cross	Krowsdhu					
	Black Rock	An Garrek Reun					
	Blackwater	Dowrdu					
	Blisland	Blus					
	Blowinghouse	Chifog					
	Blue Anchor	Ankor Glas					
	Blunts	Shoppa Blunt					
	Bocaddon	Boskadwen					
	Boconnoc	Boskennek					
	Bodanna						
	Bodbrane	Bos Bran					
	Bodella						
	Bodellick						
	Bodelva	Boselwydh					
	Boderwennack	Bos Trevenek					
	Bodgate						
	Bodieve	Bosyuv					
	Bodiggo						
	Bodilly	Bosylli					
	Bodiniel	Bodynyal					
	Bodinnick	Bosdinek					
	Bodmin	Bosvena					
	Bodrean	Bosrian					
	Bodrifty						
	Bodrigan						
	Boduel						
	Bodulgate						
	Bodwannick	Boswenek					
	Bodway						
	Bodwen	Boswynn					
	Bofarnel						
	Bohetherick						
	Bohortha	Buorthow					
	Bojewyan	Bosywyon					
	Bokiddick	Boskasek					
	Boleigh	Boslegh					
	Bolenowe	Boslenow					
	Bolingey	Melinji					
	Bolitho	Bowleythow					
	Bolventor	Bedheshardh					
	Boquio						
	Boscadjack						
	Boscastle	Kastel Boterel					
	Boscean	Bosseghan					
	Boscoppa	Boskoppa					
	Boscreege						
	Boskednan	Boskednan					
	Boskenna	Boskenow					
	Bosleake						
	Boslowick	Boselewydh					
	Boslymon	Bosseleven					
	Bosoughan	Boshoghan					
	Bosporthennis	Bosporthenys					
	Bossiney	Boskyni					
	Boswednack	Boswydnek					
	Boswin	Boswenn					
	Boswinger	Boswynngor					
	Boswyn	Boswynn					
	Botallack	Bostalek					
	Botternell						
	Bottoms						
	Botusfleming	Bosflumyes					
	Bowithick	Boswydhek					
	Bowling Green	Glesin Pelyow					
	Box's Shop	Shoppa Box					
	Boyton	Trevoya					
	Braddock, Cornwall	Brodhek					
	Bradford	Resledan					
	Brane	Bosvran					
	Bray Shop	Shoppa Bre					
	Brazacott	Bosvrosyow					
	Brea	Bre					
	Breage	Eglosbrek					
	Brent						
	Bridge	Ponsjulyan					
	Bridgend						
	Bridges	Pons					
	Bridgetown	Trebons					
	Brighton	Penn an Bluw					
	Brill	Brehelgh					
	Broad Lane						
	Brocton						
	Brooks						
	Brunnion	Bronyon					
	Bude	Porthbud					
	Budge's Shop						
	Budock Water	Roseglos	Village				
	Bugle	Karnrosveur					
	Burgois	Borrgos					
	Burlawn	Boselowen					
	Burlorne Pillow	Boselowen Pollbrogh					
	Burlorne Tregoose	Boselowen Tregoos					
	Burncoose	Bronkoos					
	Burniere						
	Burnthouse	Chileskys					
	Burras	Berres					
	Burraton	Trewerinor					
	Burraton Coombe	Komm Trewerinor					
	Buryas Bridge	Nansberres					
	Bush	Prysk					
	Busveal	Bosvayl					
	Butteris Gate						
	Buttsbear Cross						

== C ==
Image	Name	Cornish name	Status	Population	District	Parish council	Refs
	Cadgwith	Portkajwydh					
	Calenick	Klunyek					
	Callestick	Kellestek					
	Callington	Kelliwik					
	Calloose	Karloos					
	Calstock	Kalstok					
	Calvadnack	Kalvannek					
	Camborne	Kammbronn					
	Cambrose	Kammrys					
	Camelford	Reskammel					
	Camelford Station	Gorsav Reskammel					
	Cannalidgey	Kanelysi					
	Canonstown	Trejenon					
	Canworthy Water	Dowr Karn					
	Cape Cornwall	Kilgoodh					
	Caradon Town	Tre Garn					
	Carbis	Karrbons					
	Carbis Bay	Porthreptor					
	Carclaze	Krugglas					
	Carclew	Krugliw					
	Cardinham	Kardhinan					
	Carey Park	Park Carey					
	Carfury	Karnfuri					
	Cargreen	Karrekreun					
	Carkeel	Karkil					
	Carland Cross	Krowsfordh Bowdir					
	Carleen	Karleghyon					
	Carlidnack	Karlunyek					
	Carloggas	Karlogos					
	Carludon	Krugledan					
	Carlyon Bay	Porthmeur Wartha					
	Carminow Cross	Krows Karvenow					
	Carn Arthen	Karn Arthur					
	Carn Brea Village	Karnbre					
	Carn Towan	Karn Tewyn					
	Carne	Karn					
	Carnebone	Karnebwyn					
	Carnhell Green	Glesin Karnhel					
	Carnhot						
	Carnkie, Helston	Karnki					
	Carnkie, Redruth	Karnki					
	Carnkief						
	Carnon Downs	Goon Garnan					
	Carnsmerry	Karnrosmeur					
	Carnyorth	Karnyorgh					
	Caroe	Keryow					
	Carpalla	Karn Pella					
	Carthew	Kardhu					
	Carwynnen	Kerwenen					
	Carzise	Karseys					
	Castallack	Kastellek					
	Castle Dore	Kastel Dor					
	Castle Gate						
	Castle Killibury						
	Catchall	Hendra Woles					
	Cawsand	Porthbugh					
	Chacewater	Dowr an Chas					
	Chapel	Chapelkernhwili					
	Chapel Amble	Amaleglos					
	Chapel Town	Tre an Chapel					
	Charaton Cross						
	Charlestown	Porthemur West					
	Chenhalls	Chi an Als					
	Chilsworthy	Karjyl					
	Chiverton Cross	Krowsfordh Chi war Donn					
	Church Coombe	Komm Eglos					
	Church Cove	Porth Eglos					
	Church Town	Treveglos					
	Church Bridge	Pons an Eglos					
	Churchtown	Treveglos					
	Chyandour	Chi an Dowr					
	Chyanvounder	Chi an Vownder					
	Chycoose	Chi an Koos					
	Chynhale	Chi an Heyl					
	Chynoweth	Chinowydh					
	Chyvarloe	Chi war Logh					
	Clapper						
	Clerkenwater						
	Cliff						
	Clowance Wood	Koos Klewyns					
	Clubworthy	Karlonk					
	Coad's Green	Glesincoad					
	Cocks						
	Cockwells						
	Colan	Kolan					
	Cold Northcott	Boswogledh Yeyn					
	Coldharbour	Kelli Veur					
	Coldvreath	Kellivregh					
	Collamoor Head						
	Come-to-Good						
	Comford	Reskola					
	Comfort	Kommfordh					
	Common Moor	Halgemmyn					
	Congdon's Shop	Shoppa Congdon					
	Connon						
	Connor Downs	Goongoner					
	Constantine	Lanngostentin					
	Constantine Bay	Egloskostentin					
	Cooksland						
	Coombe, Bude	Komm					
	Coombe, Camborne	Komm					
	Coombe, Liskeard	Komm					
	Coombe, Redruth	Komm					
	Coombe, St. Austell	Komm					
	Coombe, Truro	Komm					
	Coppathorne	Sperntrogh					
	Copperhouse	Koberji					
	Copthorne	Spernentrogh					
	Corgee	Korn Ge					
	Costislost						
	Coswinsawsin	Koswynnsowson					
	Couch's Mill	Melin Couch					
	Coverack	Porthkovrek					
	Cowlands	Kewnans					
	Cox Hill						
	Coxford						
	Coxpark						
	Crackington Haven	Porthkragen					
	Crafthole	Toll an Kroft					
	Crahan						
	Crantock	Lanngorrow					
	Crean	Ke Krugyn					
	Creed	Krid					
	Creegbrawse						
	Crelly	Karylli					
	Cremyll	Splatt					
	Criggan						
	Crimp	Krympa					
	Cripplesease	Powes Mans					
	Croanford						
	Croft Mitchell						
	Crofthandy						
	Cross Coombe						
	Cross Hill						
	Cross Lanes	Krowsvownder					
	Crossgate						
	Crosstown						
	Crow's Nest						
	Crowan	Egloskrewen					
	Crowlas	Krowlys					
	Crowntown	Tregurun					
	Crows-an-wra	Krows an Wragh					
	Crugmeer	Krugmeur					
	Crumplehorn	Trevelhorn					
	Cubert	Egloskubert					
	Curgurrell						
	Currian Vale						
	Curry Lane	Kori					
	Cury	Egloskuri					
	Cusgarne	Kosgaran					
	Cusveorth Coombe						
	Cutmadoc	Koos Madoc					
	Cutmere	Koos Meur					

== D ==
Image	Name	Cornish name	Status	Population	District	Parish council	Refs
	Dannon Chapel						
	Darite	Darith					
	Darley Ford						
	Davidstow	Logdewi					
	Daw's House	Chidaw					
	Degibna						
	Delabole	Delyow Boll					
	Demelza	Dinmelsa					
	Deveral						
	Devoran	Deveryon					
	Dimson	Tredhynn					
	Dinas	Dinas					
	Dizzard	Diserth					
	Dobwalls	Fosow Dobb					
	Doddycross						
	Doublebois	Kosdewblek					
	Downgate	Porth an Woon					
	Downhill						
	Downinney						
	Drakewalls	Fosowdrake					
	Drawbridge	Ponsdrayl					
	Drift	An Drev					
	Drym	Drumm					
	Duloe	Dewlogh					
	Dunmere	Dinmeur					
	Dunslea						
	Dunveth						
	Durgan	Dowrgeun					
	Dutson						

== E ==
Image	Name	Cornish name	Status	Population	District	Parish council	Refs
	East Looe	Logh					
	East Taphouse	Tavarn Est					
	Eastcott	Bosest					
	Edgcumbe						
	Edmonton	Trevedmond					
	Eggbeare						
	Egloshayle	Eglosheyl					
	Egloskerry	Egloskeri					
	Ellenglaze	Heylynlas					
	Engollan	Hengollen					
	Enniscaven	Enysskawen					
	Erisey	Erysi					
	Escalls	Heskals					

== F ==
Falmouth, Farms Common, Fenton Pits, Fentonadle, Feock, Fernsplatt, Fistral Beach, Fivelanes, Fletchersbridge, Flexbury, Flushing, Fonston, Forder, Forge, Forrabury, Foundry, Four Lanes, Fowey, Foxhole, Fraddam, Fraddon, Freathy, Frogmore, Frogpool, Frogwell

== G ==
Gam, Gang, Garker, Garras, Georgia, Germoe, Gerrans, Gilbert's Coombe, Gillan, Gloweth, Gluvian, Godolphin Cross, Godrevy, Golant, Golberdon, Goldsithney, Gollawater, Gonamena, Goon Gumpas, Goon Piper, Goonabarn, Goonbell, Goonhavern, Goonhusband, Goonlaze, Goonown, Goonvrea, Gooseham, Gooseham Mill, Gorran Churchtown, Gorran Haven, Gorran High Lanes, Gothers, Gracca, Grade, Grampound, Grampound Road, Great Bosullow, Great Tree, Great Work, Green Bottom, Greensplat, Greenwith Common, Grillis, Grimscott, Grumbla, Gulval, Gummow's Shop, Gunnislake, Gunwalloe, Gwallon, Gwavas, Gwavas, Gwedna, Gweek, Gwennap, Gwenter, Gwills, Gwinear, Gwinear Downs, Gwithian

== H ==
Halabezack, Halamanning, Hale Mills, Halgabron, Hallew, Hallworthy, Halsetown, Halton Barton, Halvosso, Halwin, Hannafore, Harcourt, Harlyn, Harlyn Bay, Harrowbarrow, Hatt, Hawker's Cove, Hay, Hayle, Heamoor, Helebridge, Helford, Helford Passage, Helland, Hellandbridge, Hellesveor, Helscott, Helston, Helston Water, Helstone, Hendra, Hendra Croft, Hendrabridge, Hendraburnick, Henwood, Herniss, Herodsfoot, Hersham, Hessenford, Hewas Water, Hick's Mill, High Cross, Constantine, High Cross, Truro, High Lanes, High Street, Higher Bal, Higher Boscaswell, Higher Condurrow, Higher Crackington, Higher Cransworth, Higher Downs, Higher Lank, Higher Menadew, Higher Penpol, Higher Porthpean, Higher Tolcarne, Higher Town, Higher Town (Scilly), Higher Tremarcoombe, Highercliff, Highertown, Highlanes, Highway, Hillhead, Holmbush, Holy Vale, Holywell, Hornick, Horningtops, Horsedowns, Hugh Town, Hugus

== I ==
Idless, Illand, Illogan, Illogan Highway, Inchs, Indian Queens, Insworke

== J ==
Jacobstow, Jolly's Bottom, Joppa

== K ==
Kea, Kehelland, Kelly, Kelly Bray, Kelly Rounds, Kelynack, Kennards House, Kenneggy, Kenneggy Downs, Kents, Kenwyn, Kerley Downs, Kerris, Kersbrook Cross, Kerthen Wood, Kestle, Kestle Mill, Keybridge, Kilhallon, Kilkhampton, Killaworgey, Killivose, Kingbeare, Kingsand, Knave go by, Knightor, Knightsmill, Kuggar, Kynance Cove

== L ==
Laddenvean, Ladock, Ladycross, Laity Moor, Lamanva, Lambourne, Lamellion, Lamledra, Lamorick, Lamorna, Lamorran, Landewednack, Landrake, Land's End, Landulph, Lane, Lane-end, Laneast, Lanescot, Langarth Garden Village, Langore, Lanhydrock, Lanivet, Lanjeth, Lanjew, Lank, Lanlivery, Lanner, Lanreath, Lansallos, Lanteglos-by-Camelford, Lanteglos-by-Fowey, Lanteglos Highway, Lantuel, Lantyan, Larrick, Latchbrook, Latchley, Launcells Cross, Launceston, Lavrean, Lawhitton, Leburnick, Leedstown, Lelant, Lelant Downs, Lellizzick, Lerryn, Lesnewth, Levalsa Meor, Lewannick, Lezant, Lezerea, Linkinhorne, Liskeard, Little Beside, Little Bosullow, Little Comfort, Little Petherick, Little Treviscoe, Lizard peninsula, Lizard, Lockengate, Lodge Hill, London Apprentice, Longdowns, Long Rock, Longships, Longstone (St Mabyn), Longstone (St Mary's), Looe, Looe Mills, Lostwithiel, Lower Amble, Lower Bodinnar, Lower Boscaswell, Lower Brynn, Lower Clicker, Lower Croan, Lower Lank, Lower Menadue, Lower Mill, Lower Penpol, Lower Porthpean, Lower Rose, Lower Town, Lower Trebullett, Lower Tregantle, Lower Woodley, Lower Woon, Lowertown (Luxulyan), Lowertown-by-Helston, Luckett, Ludgvan, Luxulyan, Lynstone

== M ==
Mabe Burnthouse, Maders, Madron, Maenporth, Maer, Malpas, Manaccan, Manhay, Manor Parsley, Marazanvose, Marazion, Marhamchurch, Marshgate, Maryfield, Maudlin, Mawgan, Mawgan Porth, Mawla, Mawnan, Mawnan Smith, Maxworthy, Mayon, Maypole, Meaver, Medlyn, Melinsey, Mellangoose, Mellingey, Mena, Menabilly, Menacuddle, Menadarva, Menagissey, Menheniot, Menherion, Menna, Merry Meeting, Merrymeet, Merther, Merther Lane, Metherell, Mevagissey, Michaelstow, Middle Crackington, Middle Penpol, Middle Taphouse, Middle Town (St Agnes), Middle Town (St Martin's), Middlehill, Middlewood, Milcombe, Millbrook, Millendreath, Millook, Millpool, Milltown (Cardinham), Milltown (Lanlivery), Mineshope, Mingoose, Minions, Mitchell, Mithian, Mithian Downs, Mixtow, Molinnis, Mongleath, Monkscross, Moorswater, Mornick, Morvah, Morval, Morwenstow, Mount, Mount Ambrose, Mount Hawke, Mount Hermon, Mount Misery, Mount Pleasant, Mountjoy, Mousehole, Muchlarnick, Mulberry, Mulfra, Mullion, Mullion Cove, Mylor, Mylor Bridge, Mylor Churchtown

== N ==
Nance, Nanceddan, Nancegollan, Nancemellin, Nancenoy, Nancledra, Nanpean, Nanquidno, Nansledan, Nanstallon, Nantithet, Narkurs, Navarino, Netherton, New Downs, New Grimsby, New Mill, New Mills, New Polzeath, Newbridge, Newlyn, Newport, Newquay, Newton, Newtown, Newtown-in-St Martin, Nine Maidens Downs, Ninnes, Ninnes Bridge, No Man's Land, Noonvares, Normandy, Norris Green, North Beer, North Corner, North Country, North Darley, North Hill, North Petherwin, North Tamerton, Northcott, Northward, Notter, Notter Bridge

== O ==
Old Cardinham Castle, Old Grimsby, Old Kea, Old Mill, Old Park, Old Town, Otterham, Otterham Down, Otterham Mill, Otterham Station

== P ==
Padstow, Palmersbridge, Pantersbridge, Par, Paramoor, Parc Erissey, Park Bottom, Parkengear, Parkfield, Paul, Paul's Green, Paynter's Cross, Paynter's Lane End, Pelistry, Pelynt, Pempwell, Penare, Penbeagle, Penberth, Penberth Cove, Pencarrow, Pencoys, Pencuke, Pendeen, Pendoggett, Pendrift, Penelewey, Pengegon, Pengelly, Pengersick, Pengold, Pengover Green, Penhale, Penhale Jakes, Penhallam, Penhallick, Penhallow, Penhallym, Penhalurick, Penhalvean, Penmarth, Penmayne, Pennance, Pennytinney, Penpethy, Penpillick, Penpol, Penpoll, Penponds, Penpont, Penrose, Penrose Hill, Penryn, Pensilva, Penstraze, Pentewan, Pentire, Penwartha, Penwartha Coombe, Penweathers, Penwithick, Penzance, Percuil, Perran Downs, Perran Wharf, Perranarworthal, Perrancoombe, Perranporth, Perranuthnoe, Perranwell, Perranwell Station, Perranzabuloe, Peterville, Petherwin Gate, Phillack, Philleigh, Piece, Pillaton, Pipers Pool, Pityme, Plaidy, Plain Street, Plain-an-Gwarry, Playing Place, Plusha, Plushabridge, Point, Polbathic, Polborder, Polbrock, Poldice, Polgear, Polgigga, Polgooth, Polkerris, Polladras, Polmarth, Polmassick, Polmear, Polmorla, Polpenwith, Polpeor, Polperro, Polruan, Poltesco, Polwheveral, Polyphant, Polzeath, Poniou, Ponjeravah, Ponsanooth, Ponsongath, Pont, Pool, Porkellis, Port Gaverne, Port Quin, Port Isaac, Porteath, Porth, Porth Kea, Porth Navas, Porthallow, Porthcothan, Porthcurno, Porthgwarra, Porthgwidden, Porthhallow, Porthilly, Porthleven, Porthloo, Porthmeor, Portholland, Porthoustock, Porthtowan, Portloe, Portlooe, Portmellon, Portreath, Portscatho, Portwrinkle, Poughill, Poundstock, Praa Sands, Praze-an-Beeble, Probus, Prospidnick, Prussia Cove, Puddle

== Q ==
Quethiock, Quintrell Downs, Quoit

== R ==
Radnor, Raginnis, Rame (in Maker-with-Rame), Rame (in Wendron), Readymoney Cove, Reawla, Red Post, Redmoor, Redruth, Redtye, Reen Manor, Rejerrah, Releath, Relubbus, Rescassa, Rescorla, Reskadinnick, Restronguet Passage, Resugga Green, Retallack, Retire, Rezare, Rilla Mill, Rillaton, Rinsey, Rinsey Croft, Rising Sun, Roche, Rock, Rockhead, Rocky Hill, Roscroggan, Rose, Rose-an-Grouse, Rosecare, Rosedinnick, Rosehill, Roseland, Rosemelling, Rosemergy, Rosenannon, Rosenithon, Rosevean, Rosevear, Rosevine, Rosewarne, Roseworthy, Roseworthy Barton, Roskear Croft, Roskorwell, Rosudgeon, Row, Ruan High Lanes, Ruan Lanihorne, Ruan Major, Ruan Minor, Rumford, Ruthernbridge, Ruthvoes

== S ==
Salem, Saltash, Sancreed, Sandplace, Sandylake, Saveock, Scarcewater, Scorrier, Scredda, Sea Mills, Seaton, Seaureaugh Moor, Sellan, Sennen, Sennen Cove, Seworgan, Sharptor, Sheffield, Sheviock, Shop, Shortacross, Shortlanesend, Shutta, Silverwell, Sithney, Sithney Common, Sithney Green, Skewes, Skinner's Bottom, Sladesbridge, Slaughterbridge, South Carne, South Hill, South Petherwin, South Pill, South Tehidy, South Treveneague, South Wheatley, Southcott, Southdown, Sparnon Gate, Splatt, Stenalees, Stencoose, Stennack, Stepaside, Stibb, Sticker, Stithians, Stoke Climsland, Stoptide, Stratton, Stursdon, Summercourt, Sweets, Sweetshouse

== St ==
St Agnes (Cornish mainland), St Agnes (Isles of Scilly), St Allen, St Ann's Chapel, St Anthony-in-Meneage, St Anthony in Roseland, St Austell, St Blazey, St Blazey Gate, St Breock, St Breward, St Buryan, St Cleer, St Clement, St Clether, St Columb Major, St Columb Minor, St Columb Road, St Day, St Dennis, St Dominick, St Endellion, St Enoder, St Erme, St Erney, St Erth, St Erth Praze, St Ervan, St Eval, St Ewe, St Gennys, St Germans, St Gluvias, St Hilary, St Issey, St Ive, St Ive Cross, St Ives, St Jidgey, St John, St Just in Penwith, St Just in Roseland, St Keverne, St Kew, St Kew Highway, St Keyne, St Lawrence, St Levan, St Mabyn, St Martin-by-Looe, St Martin-in-Meneage, St Mawes, St Mawgan, St Mellion, St Merryn, St Mewan, St Michael Caerhays, St Michael Penkevil, St Michael's Mount, St Minver, St Neot, St Newlyn East, St Pinnock, St Ruan, St Stephens by Saltash, St Stephens, St Teath, St Tudy, St Veep, St Wenn, St Winnow

== T ==
Talland, Talskiddy, Telegraph, Temple, Tencreek, Terras, The Towans, Thorne, Three Hammers, Three Holes Cross, Threemilestone, Threewaters, Thurdon, Tideford, Tideford Cross, Tilland, Timbrelham, Tintagel, Titson, Todpool, Tolborough, Tolcarne, Tolcarne Wartha, Toldish, Tolgullow, Tolgus Mount, Tolskithy, Tolvaddon Downs, Tomperrow, Torfrey, Torpoint, Towan, Towan Cross, Towednack, Townshend, Traboe, Tramagenna, Treal, Treamble, Treath, Treator, Trebarber, Trebartha, Trebarwith, Trebarwith Strand, Trebeath, Trebell Green, Trebetherick, Trebilcock, Trebudannon, Trebullett, Treburgett, Treburgie, Treburley, Treburrick, Trebyan, Treclago, Tredannick, Tredaule, Tredavoe, Tredethy, Tredinnick, Tredrizzick, Treen (in St Levan parish), Treen (in Zennor parish), Treesmill, Trefanny Hill, Treforda, Trefrize, Trefusis, Tregada, Tregadgwith, Tregadillett, Tregajorran, Tregamere, Tregardock, Tregargus, Tregarland, Tregarlandbridge, Tregarne, Tregarrick Mill, Tregaswith, Tregatillian, Tregatta, Tregavarah, Tregear, Tregeare, Tregellist, Tregeseal, Tregew, Tregidden, Tregirls, Tregirls beach, Tregolls, Tregona, Tregonce, Tregonetha, Tregonna, Tregonning, Tregony, Tregoodwell, Tregoose, Tregorden, Tregorrick, Tregoss, Tregreenwell, Tregrehan Mills, Tregue, Tregullon, Tregunna, Tregurrian, Tregurtha Downs, Trehan, Trehemborne, Trehunist, Trekeivesteps, Trekenner, Trekenning, Treknow, Trelan, Trelash, Trelassick, Treleigh, Trelew, Treligga, Trelights, Trelill, Trelion, Treliske, Trelissick, Treliver, Treloquithack, Trelowia, Trelowth, Tremail, Tremaine, Tremar, Trematon, Trematon Castle, Tremayne, Trembraze, Tremedda, Tremethick Cross, Tremore, Tremorebridge, Tremough, Trenance, Trenant, Trenarren, Trenay, Trencreek, Trencrom, Trendeal, Trenear, Treneglos, Trenerth, Trenean, Trenethick Barton Trengale, Trengune, Trenhorne, Treningle, Treninnick, Trenithon, Trenoon, Trenoweth, Trenoweth, Isles of Scilly, Trenwheal, Trequite, Trerair, Trerise, Trerose, Trerulefoot, Tresamble, Tresarrett, Tresavean, Tresawle, Tresawson, Trescoll, Trescowe, Tresean, Tresevern Croft, Tresillian, Tresinney, Treskerby, Treskillard, Treskilling, Treskinnick Cross, Treslothan, Tresmeer, Tresowes Green, Tresoweshill, Tresparrett, Tresparrett Posts, Treswithian, Treswithian Downs, Trethellan Water, Trethevy, Trethewell, Trethewey, Trethillick, Trethosa, Trethowel, Trethurgy, Trevadlock, Trevalga, Trevalgan, Trevance, Trevanger, Trevanson, Trevarrack, Trevarren, Trevarrian, Trevarrick, Trevarth, Treveal, Trevegean, Treveighan, Trevellas, Trevelmond, Trevelver, Trevemper, Treven, Trevena, Trevenen, Trevenen Bal, Trevenning, Treveor, Treverbyn, Treverva, Trevescan, Trevia, Trevigro, Trevilder, Trevilla, Trevilson, Trevine, Treviscoe, Treviskey, Trevithal, Trevoll, Trevone, Trevorrick, Trevowah, Trevowhan, Trew, Trewalder, Trewarmett, Trewartha, Trewassa, Treween, Trewellard, Trewen, Trewennack, Trewennan, Trewetha, Trewethen, Trewethern, Trewey, Trewhiddle, Trewidland, Trewindle, Trewinnion, Trewint, Trewithian, Trewithick, Trewollock, Trewoodloe, Trewoon, Treworga, Treworlas, Treworld, Trewornan, Treworrick, Treworthal, Treyarnon, Trezaise, Trezelah, Trillacott, Trispen, Troan, Trolver, Troon, Troswell, Truas, Truro, Truscott, Trussall, Truthan, Truthwall, Trythogga, Tubbs Mill, Tuckingmill (near Camborne), Tuckingmill (near St Breward), Tuelmenna, Turfdown, Tutwell, Twelveheads, Twelvewoods, Two Bridges, Two Burrows, Tywardreath, Tywardreath Highway

== U ==
United Downs, Uny Lelant, Upton, Upton Cross

== V ==
Valley Truckle, Varfell, Vellanoweth, Venterdon, Ventongimps, Ventonleague, Veryan, Victoria, Viscar, Vogue

== W ==
Wadebridge, Wainhouse Corner, Wall, Wanson, Warbstow, Warbstow Cross, Warleggan, Washaway, Watergate, Waterloo, Wearde, Week Green, Week St Mary, Welltown, Wendron, Wenfordbridge, Werrington, West Curry, West Downs, West Looe, West Pentire, West Taphouse, West Tolgus, West Watergate, West Youlstone, Westdowns, Wheal Alfred, Wheal Baddon, Wheal Busy, Wheal Coates, Wheal Frances, Wheal Kitty, Wheal Rose, Wherrytown, Whipsiderry, White Cross, Whitecross (Crowlas), Whitecross (Lanteglos), Whitecross (St Breock), Whitecross (Blisland), Whitemoor, Whitewell, Whitstone, Widegates, Widemouth Bay, Wilcove, Windmill, Windsor, Winnard's Perch, Withiel, Withielgoose, Woodford, Woolley, Woolston, Woon, Wringsdown

== Y ==
Yeolmbridge

== Z ==
Zelah, Zennor, Zoar

== See also ==
- List of settlements in Cornwall by population
- Places of interest in Cornwall
- List of farms in Cornwall
- List of topics related to Cornwall
- List of windmills in Cornwall
- List of civil parishes in Cornwall
- List of places in England
