= List of United Kingdom locations: Tr-Tre =

The United Kingdom

This is part of the list of United Kingdom locations: a gazetteer of place names in the United Kingdom showing each place's locality and geographical coordinates.

== Tr ==
=== Tra ===
Location	Locality	Coordinates (links to map & photo sources)	OS grid reference
Trabboch	East Ayrshire	55.45°N 04.48°W	NS4321
Traboe	Cornwall	50.04°N 05.15°W	SW7421
Trabrown	Scottish Borders	55.73°N 02.79°W	NT5049
Tracebridge	Somerset	50.98°N 03.34°W	ST0621
Tradespark	Orkney Islands	58.95°N 02.95°W	HY4508
Tradespark	Highland	57.58°N 03.90°W	NH8656
Trafford Park	Trafford	53.46°N 02.33°W	SJ7896
Trallong	Powys	51.95°N 03.51°W	SN9629
Trallwn	Swansea	51.64°N 03.89°W	SS6996
Trallwn	Rhondda, Cynon, Taff	51.60°N 03.34°W	ST0790
Trallwng	Powys	52.65°N 03.15°W	SJ2207
Tramagenna	Cornwall	50.60°N 04.70°W	SX0982
Tram Inn	Herefordshire	51.99°N 02.78°W	SO4633
Tranch	Torfaen	51.69°N 03.05°W	SO2700
Tranent	East Lothian	55.93°N 02.96°W	NT4072
Tranmere	Wirral	53.37°N 03.02°W	SJ3287
Trantlebeg	Highland	58.45°N 03.90°W	NC8953
Trantlemore	Highland	58.45°N 03.92°W	NC8853
Tranwell	Northumberland	55.14°N 01.71°W	NZ1883
Trapp	Carmarthenshire	51.84°N 03.96°W	SN6518
Traprain	East Lothian	55.96°N 02.65°W	NT5975
Trap's Green	Warwickshire	52.31°N 01.85°W	SP1069
Trapshill	Berkshire	51.36°N 01.46°W	SU3763
Traquair	Scottish Borders	55.59°N 03.06°W	NT3334
Trash Green	Berkshire	51.41°N 01.06°W	SU6569
Travellers' Rest	Carmarthenshire	51.84°N 04.35°W	SN3819
Trawden	Lancashire	53.83°N 02.13°W	SD9138
Trawsfynydd	Gwynedd	52.89°N 03.93°W	SH7035
Trawsgoed	Powys	51.99°N 03.34°W	SO0834
Trawsnant	Ceredigion	52.27°N 04.11°W	SN5666

=== Tre ===
==== Trea-Trem ====
Location	Locality	Coordinates (links to map & photo sources)	OS grid reference
Trealaw	Rhondda, Cynon, Taff	51.61°N 03.46°W	SS9992
Treales	Lancashire	53.78°N 02.85°W	SD4432
Treamble	Cornwall	50.36°N 05.12°W	SW7856
Trearddur	Isle of Anglesey	53.27°N 04.62°W	SH2579
Treath	Cornwall	50.09°N 05.13°W	SW7626
Treator	Cornwall	50.53°N 04.96°W	SW9075
Tre-Aubrey	The Vale Of Glamorgan	51.43°N 03.39°W	ST0372
Trebanog	Rhondda, Cynon, Taff	51.60°N 03.43°W	ST0190
Trebanos	Neath Port Talbot	51.71°N 03.86°W	SN7103
Trebarber	Cornwall	50.41°N 05.01°W	SW8662
Trebartha	Cornwall	50.56°N 04.45°W	SX2677
Trebarwith	Cornwall	50.64°N 04.75°W	SX0586
Trebarwith Strand	Cornwall	50.64°N 04.77°W	SX0486
Trebeath	Cornwall	50.65°N 04.47°W	SX2587
Tre-Beferad	The Vale Of Glamorgan	51.40°N 03.46°W	SS9868
Trebell Green	Cornwall	50.42°N 04.74°W	SX0562
Treberfydd	Powys	51.91°N 03.28°W	SO1225
Trebetherick	Cornwall	50.56°N 04.92°W	SW9378
Trebilcock	Cornwall	50.40°N 04.83°W	SW9960
Treble's Holford	Somerset	51.09°N 03.21°W	ST1533
Tre-boeth	Swansea	51.64°N 03.95°W	SS6596
Treborough	Somerset	51.11°N 03.41°W	ST0136
Trebudannon	Cornwall	50.41°N 04.97°W	SW8961
Trebullett	Cornwall	50.57°N 04.37°W	SX3278
Treburgett	Cornwall	50.57°N 04.75°W	SX0579
Treburgie	Cornwall	50.44°N 04.53°W	SX2064
Treburley	Cornwall	50.56°N 04.34°W	SX3477
Treburrick	Cornwall	50.49°N 05.01°W	SW8670
Trebyan	Cornwall	50.43°N 04.71°W	SX0763
Trecastle	Powys	51.94°N 03.63°W	SN8829
Trecenydd	Caerphilly	51.57°N 03.24°W	ST1487
Trecott	Devon	50.78°N 03.94°W	SS6300
Trecwn	Pembrokeshire	51.94°N 04.95°W	SM9732
Trecynon	Rhondda, Cynon, Taff	51.71°N 03.46°W	SN9903
Tredannick	Cornwall	50.50°N 04.80°W	SX0171
Tredaule	Cornwall	50.60°N 04.50°W	SX2381
Tredavoe	Cornwall	50.09°N 05.56°W	SW4528
Tredegar	Blaenau Gwent	51.77°N 03.24°W	SO1409
Trederwen	Powys	52.72°N 03.08°W	SJ2715
Tre-derwen	Powys	52.76°N 03.14°W	SJ2319
Tredethy	Cornwall	50.50°N 04.73°W	SX0671
Tredington	Warwickshire	52.08°N 01.63°W	SP2543
Tredington	Gloucestershire	51.95°N 02.14°W	SO9029
Tredinneck (Madron)	Cornwall	50.15°N 05.58°W	SW4434
Tredinnick (St Neot)	Cornwall	50.46°N 04.59°W	SX1666
Tredinnick (Luxulyan)	Cornwall	50.39°N 04.75°W	SX0459
Tredinnick (St Issey)	Cornwall	50.49°N 04.93°W	SW9270
Tredinnick (Duloe)	Cornwall	50.38°N 04.49°W	SX2357
Tredogan	The Vale Of Glamorgan	51.39°N 03.33°W	ST0767
Tredomen	Powys	51.97°N 03.28°W	SO1231
Tredomen	Caerphilly	51.63°N 03.25°W	ST1394
Tredown	Devon	50.93°N 04.52°W	SS2318
Tredrizzick	Cornwall	50.54°N 04.89°W	SW9576
Tredunnock	Monmouthshire	51.64°N 02.91°W	ST3794
Tredustan	Powys	51.97°N 03.26°W	SO1332
Tredworth	Gloucestershire	51.85°N 02.23°W	SO8417
Treen (St Levan)	Cornwall	50.04°N 05.64°W	SW3923
Treen (Zennor)	Cornwall	50.17°N 05.60°W	SW4337
Treesmill	Cornwall	50.36°N 04.70°W	SX0855
Treeton	Rotherham	53.37°N 01.35°W	SK4387
Trefaes	Gwynedd	52.85°N 04.60°W	SH2532
Trefanny Hill	Cornwall	50.38°N 04.53°W	SX2057
Trefasser	Pembrokeshire	51.99°N 05.07°W	SM8937
Trefdraeth	Isle of Anglesey	53.20°N 04.39°W	SH4070
Trefeca	Powys	51.98°N 03.25°W	SO1432
Trefechan	Ceredigion	52.40°N 04.08°W	SN5881
Trefechan	Merthyr Tydfil	51.76°N 03.40°W	SO0308
Trefechan	Wrexham	52.99°N 03.10°W	SJ2645
Trefeglwys	Powys	52.49°N 03.51°W	SN9790
Trefeitha	Powys	51.97°N 03.31°W	SO1031
Trefenter	Ceredigion	52.29°N 04.05°W	SN6068
Treffgarne	Pembrokeshire	51.86°N 04.97°W	SM9523
Treffynnon	Flintshire	53.26°N 03.23°W	SJ1875
Treffynnon	Pembrokeshire	51.90°N 05.14°W	SM8428
Trefgarn Owen	Pembrokeshire	51.88°N 05.11°W	SM8625
Trefil	Blaenau Gwent	51.79°N 03.27°W	SO1212
Trefilan	Ceredigion	52.19°N 04.13°W	SN5457
Trefin	Pembrokeshire	51.94°N 05.15°W	SM8332
Treflach	Shropshire	52.81°N 03.09°W	SJ2625
Trefnanney	Powys	52.72°N 03.18°W	SJ2015
Trefnant	Denbighshire	53.21°N 03.42°W	SJ0570
Trefonen	Shropshire	52.82°N 03.11°W	SJ2526
Trefor	Isle of Anglesey	53.29°N 04.44°W	SH3780
Trefor	Gwynedd	52.98°N 04.42°W	SH3746
Treforda	Cornwall	50.59°N 04.72°W	SX0781
Treforest	Rhondda, Cynon, Taff	51.58°N 03.32°W	ST0888
Treforgan	Ceredigion	52.08°N 04.62°W	SN2046
Tre-Forgan	Neath Port Talbot	51.73°N 03.75°W	SN7906
Trefriw	Conwy	53.15°N 03.82°W	SH7863
Trefrize	Cornwall	50.55°N 04.40°W	SX3076
Tref-y-Clawdd	Powys	52.34°N 03.05°W	SO2872
Trefynwy	Monmouthshire	51.80°N 02.72°W	SO5012
Tregada	Cornwall	50.60°N 04.34°W	SX3481
Tregadgwith	Cornwall	50.06°N 05.60°W	SW4225
Tregadillett	Cornwall	50.62°N 04.41°W	SX2983
Tre-gagle	Monmouthshire	51.75°N 02.69°W	SO5207
Tregaian	Isle of Anglesey	53.28°N 04.32°W	SH4579
Tregajorran	Cornwall	50.21°N 05.26°W	SW6740
Tregamere	Cornwall	50.43°N 04.93°W	SW9264
Tregardock	Cornwall	50.61°N 04.77°W	SX0483
Tregare	Monmouthshire	51.78°N 02.85°W	SO4110
Tregargus	Cornwall	50.34°N 04.89°W	SW9453
Tregarland	Cornwall	50.38°N 04.46°W	SX2557
Tregarlandbridge	Cornwall	50.38°N 04.47°W	SX2457
Tregarne	Cornwall	50.05°N 05.10°W	SW7822
Tregaron	Ceredigion	52.21°N 03.94°W	SN6759
Tregarrick Mill	Cornwall	50.38°N 04.53°W	SX2057
Tregarth	Gwynedd	53.18°N 04.09°W	SH6067
Tregatillian	Cornwall	50.43°N 04.93°W	SW9263
Tregatta	Cornwall	50.65°N 04.76°W	SX0587
Tregavarah	Cornwall	50.10°N 05.58°W	SW4429
Tregear	Cornwall	50.06°N 05.22°W	SW6923
Tregeare	Cornwall	50.64°N 04.49°W	SX2486
Tregeiriog	Wrexham	52.88°N 03.23°W	SJ1733
Tregele	Isle of Anglesey	53.39°N 04.48°W	SH3592
Tregellist	Cornwall	50.55°N 04.82°W	SX0077
Tregeseal	Cornwall	50.12°N 05.68°W	SW3732
Tregew	Cornwall	50.16°N 05.08°W	SW8034
Tre-Gibbon	Rhondda, Cynon, Taff	51.73°N 03.46°W	SN9905
Tregidden	Cornwall	50.06°N 05.14°W	SW7523
Treginnis	Pembrokeshire	51.86°N 05.31°W	SM7224
Treglemais	Pembrokeshire	51.90°N 05.18°W	SM8128
Tregolls	Cornwall	50.18°N 05.18°W	SW7336
Tregona	Cornwall	50.48°N 05.03°W	SW8569
Tregonce	Cornwall	50.51°N 04.93°W	SW9273
Tregonetha	Cornwall	50.43°N 04.88°W	SW9563
Tregonna	Cornwall	50.51°N 04.94°W	SW9172
Tregonning	Cornwall	50.38°N 05.01°W	SW8658
Tregony	Cornwall	50.26°N 04.92°W	SW9245
Tregoodwell	Cornwall	50.61°N 04.67°W	SX1183
Tregorden	Cornwall	50.53°N 04.82°W	SX0074
Tregorrick	Cornwall	50.32°N 04.79°W	SX0151
Tregoss	Cornwall	50.40°N 04.87°W	SW9660
Tregoyd Mill	Powys	52.02°N 03.19°W	SO1837
Tregreenwell	Cornwall	50.58°N 04.72°W	SX0780
Tregrehan Mills	Cornwall	50.34°N 04.75°W	SX0453
Tregroes	Ceredigion	52.07°N 04.33°W	SN4044
Tregullon	Cornwall	50.44°N 04.73°W	SX0664
Tregunna	Cornwall	50.52°N 04.87°W	SW9673
Tregurrian	Cornwall	50.44°N 05.02°W	SW8565
Tregurtha Downs	Cornwall	50.12°N 05.45°W	SW5331
Tregyddulan	Pembrokeshire	51.98°N 05.07°W	SM8936
Tregynon	Powys	52.57°N 03.34°W	SO0998
Tre-gynwr	Carmarthenshire	51.84°N 04.30°W	SN4119
Trehafod	Rhondda, Cynon, Taff	51.60°N 03.38°W	ST0491
Trehafren	Powys	52.50°N 03.34°W	SO0990
Trehan	Cornwall	50.39°N 04.25°W	SX4057
Treharris	Merthyr Tydfil	51.66°N 03.31°W	ST0997
Trehemborne	Cornwall	50.51°N 05.00°W	SW8773
Treherbert	Rhondda, Cynon, Taff	51.67°N 03.53°W	SS9498
Trehill	The Vale Of Glamorgan	51.45°N 03.32°W	ST0874
Trehunist	Cornwall	50.44°N 04.38°W	SX3163
Tre-Ifor	Rhondda, Cynon, Taff	51.73°N 03.46°W	SN9905
Trekeivesteps	Cornwall	50.50°N 04.51°W	SX2270
Trekenner	Cornwall	50.57°N 04.34°W	SX3478
Trekenning	Cornwall	50.42°N 04.95°W	SW9062
Treknow	Cornwall	50.64°N 04.75°W	SX0586
Trelan	Cornwall	50.01°N 05.15°W	SW7418
Tre-lan	Flintshire	53.17°N 03.24°W	SJ1765
Trelash	Cornwall	50.68°N 04.57°W	SX1890
Trelawnyd	Flintshire	53.30°N 03.38°W	SJ0879
Trelech	Carmarthenshire	51.94°N 04.50°W	SN2830
Treleddyd-fawr	Pembrokeshire	51.89°N 05.27°W	SM7527
Treleigh	Cornwall	50.24°N 05.22°W	SW7043
Trelew	Cornwall	50.17°N 05.06°W	SW8135
Trelewis	Merthyr Tydfil	51.66°N 03.30°W	ST1097
Treligga	Cornwall	50.62°N 04.75°W	SX0584
Trelights	Cornwall	50.57°N 04.84°W	SW9979
Trelill	Cornwall	50.56°N 04.76°W	SX0478
Trelion	Cornwall	50.33°N 04.91°W	SW9352
Treliske	Cornwall	50.26°N 05.08°W	SW8045
Trelissick	Cornwall	50.21°N 05.04°W	SW8339
Treliver	Cornwall	50.45°N 04.84°W	SW9865
Trellech	Monmouthshire	51.74°N 02.72°W	SO5005
Trelleck Grange	Monmouthshire	51.70°N 02.73°W	SO4901
Trelogan	Flintshire	53.30°N 03.33°W	SJ1180
Treloquithack	Cornwall	50.11°N 05.23°W	SW6929
Trelowia	Cornwall	50.37°N 04.40°W	SX2956
Trelowth	Cornwall	50.32°N 04.82°W	SW9951
Trelystan	Powys	52.62°N 03.09°W	SJ2603
Tremadog	Gwynedd	52.93°N 04.14°W	SH5640
Tremail	Cornwall	50.64°N 04.60°W	SX1686
Tremain	Ceredigion	52.10°N 04.58°W	SN2348
Tremaine	Cornwall	50.66°N 04.50°W	SX2388
Tremains	Bridgend	51.49°N 03.57°W	SS9179
Tremar	Cornwall	50.48°N 04.46°W	SX2568
Trematon	Cornwall	50.40°N 04.26°W	SX3959
Trematon Castle	Cornwall	50.39°N 04.23°W	SX4157
Tremayne	Cornwall	50.16°N 05.30°W	SW6435
Trembraze	Cornwall	50.45°N 04.46°W	SX2565
Tremedda	Cornwall	50.19°N 05.56°W	SW4639
Tremeirchion	Denbighshire	53.24°N 03.38°W	SJ0873
Tremethick Cross	Cornwall	50.11°N 05.58°W	SW4430
Tremore	Cornwall	50.44°N 04.80°W	SX0164
Tremorebridge	Cornwall	50.44°N 04.81°W	SX0064
Tremorfa	Cardiff	51.48°N 03.15°W	ST2077
Tre-Mostyn	Flintshire	53.30°N 03.29°W	SJ1479

==== Tren-Trez ====
Location	Locality	Coordinates (links to map & photo sources)	OS grid reference
Trenance (St Issey)	Cornwall	50.50°N 04.93°W	SW9271
Trenance (Mawgan Porth)	Cornwall	50.46°N 05.03°W	SW8567
Trenance (Newquay)	Cornwall	50.40°N 05.08°W	SW8161
Trenance (Withiel)	Cornwall	50.44°N 04.84°W	SW9864
Trenant (Wadebridge)	Cornwall	50.51°N 04.83°W	SW9972
Trenant (St Neot)	Cornwall	50.48°N 04.52°W	SX2168
Trenarren	Cornwall	50.29°N 04.76°W	SX0348
Trenay	Cornwall	50.46°N 04.59°W	SX1666
Trench	Shropshire	52.70°N 02.46°W	SJ6912
Trench Green	Oxfordshire	51.48°N 01.02°W	SU6877
Trench Wood	Kent	51.20°N 00.27°E	TQ5948
Trencreek	Cornwall	50.39°N 05.06°W	SW8260
Trencrom	Cornwall	50.17°N 05.48°W	SW5136
Trendeal	Cornwall	50.33°N 04.96°W	SW8952
Trenear	Cornwall	50.13°N 05.24°W	SW6831
Treneglos	Cornwall	50.66°N 04.54°W	SX2088
Trenerth	Cornwall	50.16°N 05.36°W	SW6035
Trenewan	Cornwall	50.34°N 04.57°W	SX1753
Trengale	Cornwall	50.47°N 04.52°W	SX2167
Trengune	Cornwall	50.70°N 04.57°W	SX1893
Trenhorne	Cornwall	50.57°N 04.44°W	SX2778
Treningle	Cornwall	50.45°N 04.76°W	SX0465
Treninnick	Cornwall	50.39°N 05.08°W	SW8160
Trenoon	Cornwall	50.01°N 05.21°W	SW7018
Trenoweth	Cornwall	50.15°N 05.15°W	SW7533
Trent	Dorset	50.96°N 02.58°W	ST5918
Trentham	City of Stoke-on-Trent	52.96°N 02.19°W	SJ8741
Trentishoe	Devon	51.21°N 03.94°W	SS6448
Trentlock	Derbyshire	52.87°N 01.28°W	SK4831
Trent Vale	Staffordshire	52.98°N 02.21°W	SJ8643
Trenwheal	Cornwall	50.13°N 05.34°W	SW6132
Treoes	The Vale Of Glamorgan	51.49°N 03.52°W	SS9478
Treorchy / Treorci	Rhondda, Cynon, Taff	51.65°N 03.51°W	SS9596
Treowen	Powys	52.50°N 03.31°W	SO1191
Treowen	Caerphilly	51.67°N 03.15°W	ST2098
Tre-pit	The Vale Of Glamorgan	51.43°N 03.56°W	SS9172
Trequite	Cornwall	50.55°N 04.79°W	SX0276
Tre'r-ddôl	Ceredigion	52.50°N 03.97°W	SN6692
Trerhyngyll	The Vale Of Glamorgan	51.47°N 03.44°W	ST0076
Trerise	Cornwall	50.00°N 05.19°W	SW7117
Trerose	Cornwall	50.10°N 05.10°W	SW7827
Trerulefoot	Cornwall	50.39°N 04.36°W	SX3258
Tresaith	Ceredigion	52.13°N 04.52°W	SN2751
Tresamble	Cornwall	50.20°N 05.15°W	SW7539
Tresarrett	Cornwall	50.52°N 04.71°W	SX0873
Tresavean	Cornwall	50.20°N 05.19°W	SW7239
Tresawle	Cornwall	50.27°N 04.96°W	SW8946
Tresawsen	Cornwall	50.29°N 05.11°W	SW7849
Tresco	Isles of Scilly	49.95°N 06.33°W	SV894147
Trescoll	Cornwall	50.41°N 04.77°W	SX0361
Trescott	Staffordshire	52.57°N 02.23°W	SO8497
Trescowe	Cornwall	50.12°N 05.40°W	SW5730
Tresean	Cornwall	50.38°N 05.12°W	SW7858
Tresevern Croft	Cornwall	50.18°N 05.20°W	SW7137
Tresham	Gloucestershire	51.61°N 02.30°W	ST7991
Treshnish Isles	Argyll and Bute	56.50°N 06.39°W	NM297434
Tresillian	Cornwall	50.27°N 05.00°W	SW8646
Tresinney	Cornwall	50.59°N 04.68°W	SX1081
Treskerby	Cornwall	50.24°N 05.21°W	SW7143
Treskillard	Cornwall	50.20°N 05.26°W	SW6739
Treskilling	Cornwall	50.37°N 04.77°W	SX0357
Treskinnick Cross	Cornwall	50.75°N 04.55°W	SX2098
Treslothan	Cornwall	50.18°N 05.29°W	SW6537
Tresmeer	Cornwall	50.65°N 04.50°W	SX2387
Tres Ness	Orkney Islands	59.22°N 02.51°W	HY708380
Tresowes Green	Cornwall	50.11°N 05.37°W	SW5929
Tresoweshill	Cornwall	50.11°N 05.35°W	SW6029
Tresparrett	Cornwall	50.68°N 04.63°W	SX1491
Tresparrett Posts	Cornwall	50.70°N 04.63°W	SX1493
Tressady	Highland	58.00°N 04.21°W	NC6904
Tressait / Tressair	Perth and Kinross	56.71°N 03.94°W	NN8160
Tresta	Shetland Islands	60.24°N 01.35°W	HU3651
Treswell	Nottinghamshire	53.30°N 00.83°W	SK7879
Treswithian	Cornwall	50.21°N 05.32°W	SW6340
Treswithian Downs	Cornwall	50.22°N 05.32°W	SW6341
Tre-Taliesin	Ceredigion	52.50°N 03.99°W	SN6591
Trethellan Water	Cornwall	50.19°N 05.21°W	SW7138
Trethevy	Cornwall	50.66°N 04.73°W	SX0789
Trethewell	Cornwall	50.17°N 05.01°W	SW8535
Trethewey	Cornwall	50.04°N 05.66°W	SW3823
Trethillick	Cornwall	50.53°N 04.96°W	SW9075
Trethomas	Caerphilly	51.58°N 03.18°W	ST1888
Trethosa	Cornwall	50.34°N 04.89°W	SW9454
Trethowel	Cornwall	50.34°N 04.79°W	SX0153
Trethurgy	Cornwall	50.36°N 04.77°W	SX0355
Tretio	Pembrokeshire	51.90°N 05.22°W	SM7828
Tretire	Herefordshire	51.90°N 02.69°W	SO5223
Tretower	Powys	51.88°N 03.19°W	SO1821
Treuddyn	Flintshire	53.11°N 03.12°W	SJ2558
Trevadlock	Cornwall	50.58°N 04.45°W	SX2679
Trevail	Cornwall	50.38°N 05.12°W	SW7858
Trevalga	Cornwall	50.67°N 04.71°W	SX0890
Trevalgan	Cornwall	50.20°N 05.51°W	SW4940
Trevalyn	Wrexham	53.09°N 02.94°W	SJ3756
Trevance	Cornwall	50.50°N 04.92°W	SW9371
Trevanger	Cornwall	50.55°N 04.89°W	SW9577
Trevanson	Cornwall	50.51°N 04.86°W	SW9772
Trevarrack	Cornwall	50.12°N 05.52°W	SW4831
Trevarren	Cornwall	50.40°N 04.94°W	SW9160
Trevarrian	Cornwall	50.45°N 05.03°W	SW8566
Trevarrick	Cornwall	50.25°N 04.83°W	SW9843
Trevarth	Cornwall	50.21°N 05.19°W	SW7240
Trevaughan (Whitland)	Carmarthenshire	51.80°N 04.61°W	SN2015
Trevaughan (Carmarthen)	Carmarthenshire	51.86°N 04.33°W	SN3921
Treveal	Cornwall	50.20°N 05.54°W	SW4740
Trevegean	Cornwall	50.10°N 05.69°W	SW3629
Treveighan	Cornwall	50.57°N 04.72°W	SX0779
Trevellas	Cornwall	50.32°N 05.17°W	SW7452
Trevelmond	Cornwall	50.43°N 04.53°W	SX2063
Trevelver	Cornwall	50.52°N 04.89°W	SW9574
Trevemper	Cornwall	50.39°N 05.08°W	SW8159
Treven	Cornwall	50.65°N 04.76°W	SX0587
Trevena	Cornwall	50.10°N 05.34°W	SW6128
Trevenen	Cornwall	50.11°N 05.24°W	SW6829
Trevenen Bal	Cornwall	50.11°N 05.26°W	SW6729
Trevenning	Cornwall	50.56°N 04.72°W	SX0777
Treveor	Cornwall	50.23°N 04.83°W	SW9841
Treverbyn (mid-Cornwall, near Stenalees)	Cornwall	50.37°N 04.80°W	SX0156
Treverbyn (St Neot)	Cornwall	50.47°N 04.53°W	SX2067
Treverbyn (mid-Cornwall, near Penwithick)	Cornwall	50.37°N 04.77°W	SX0356
Treverva	Cornwall	50.13°N 05.15°W	SW7531
Trevescan	Cornwall	50.05°N 05.70°W	SW3524
Trevethin	Torfaen	51.71°N 03.05°W	SO2702
Trevia	Cornwall	50.61°N 04.70°W	SX0983
Trevigro	Cornwall	50.49°N 04.35°W	SX3369
Trevilder	Cornwall	50.51°N 04.79°W	SX0272
Trevilla	Cornwall	50.21°N 05.05°W	SW8239
Trevilson	Cornwall	50.35°N 05.03°W	SW8455
Trevine	Cornwall	50.54°N 04.83°W	SW9976
Treviscoe	Cornwall	50.36°N 04.89°W	SW9456
Treviskey	Cornwall	50.20°N 05.19°W	SW7239
Trevithal	Cornwall	50.07°N 05.55°W	SW4626
Trevoll	Cornwall	50.38°N 05.05°W	SW8358
Trevone	Cornwall	50.53°N 04.97°W	SW8975
Trevor	Wrexham	52.97°N 03.08°W	SJ2742
Trevor Gardens	East Sussex	50.85°N 00.05°E	TQ4508
Trevorrick	Cornwall	50.51°N 04.93°W	SW9273
Trevor Uchaf	Denbighshire	52.97°N 03.13°W	SJ2442
Trevose Head	Cornwall	50.54°N 05.02°W	SW857761
Trevowah	Cornwall	50.38°N 05.11°W	SW7959
Trevowhan	Cornwall	50.15°N 05.64°W	SW4035
Trew	Cornwall	50.11°N 05.34°W	SW6129
Trewalder	Cornwall	50.60°N 04.72°W	SX0782
Trewarmett	Cornwall	50.64°N 04.74°W	SX0686
Trewartha (Carbis Bay)	Cornwall	50.18°N 05.48°W	SW5137
Trewartha (Veryan)	Cornwall	50.21°N 04.91°W	SW9239
Trewassa	Cornwall	50.64°N 04.63°W	SX1486
Trewavas Head	Cornwall	50.09°N 05.36°W	SW596267
Treween	Cornwall	50.61°N 04.51°W	SX2282
Trewellard	Cornwall	50.13°N 05.68°W	SW3733
Trewen (Camelford)	Cornwall	50.61°N 04.71°W	SX0883
Trewen (North Cornwall)	Cornwall	50.62°N 04.47°W	SX2583
Trewen	Monmouthshire	51.60°N 02.79°W	ST4590
Trewennack	Cornwall	50.10°N 05.24°W	SW6828
Trewennan	Cornwall	50.59°N 04.74°W	SX0681
Trewern	Powys	52.69°N 03.06°W	SJ2811
Trewetha	Cornwall	50.58°N 04.82°W	SX0080
Trewethen	Cornwall	50.57°N 04.76°W	SX0479
Trewethern	Cornwall	50.54°N 04.82°W	SX0076
Trewey	Cornwall	50.18°N 05.57°W	SW4538
Trewidland	Cornwall	50.40°N 04.46°W	SX2559
Trewindle	Cornwall	50.42°N 04.62°W	SX1462
Trewint (Altarnun)	Cornwall	50.59°N 04.51°W	SX2280
Trewint (Poundstock)	Cornwall	50.74°N 04.58°W	SX1897
Trewint (Menheniot)	Cornwall	50.44°N 04.40°W	SX2963
Trewithian	Cornwall	50.19°N 04.98°W	SW8737
Trewithick	Cornwall	50.63°N 04.41°W	SX2985
Trewollock	Cornwall	50.24°N 04.80°W	SX0042
Trewoodloe	Cornwall	50.51°N 04.37°W	SX3271
Trewoon (St Austell)	Cornwall	50.33°N 04.82°W	SW9952
Trewoon (Mullion)	Cornwall	50.02°N 05.24°W	SW6819
Treworga	Cornwall	50.22°N 04.95°W	SW8940
Treworgan Common	Monmouthshire	51.74°N 02.84°W	SO4205
Treworlas	Cornwall	50.20°N 04.95°W	SW8938
Treworld	Cornwall	50.67°N 04.67°W	SX1190
Trewornan	Cornwall	50.53°N 04.85°W	SW9874
Treworrick	Cornwall	50.48°N 04.49°W	SX2368
Treworthal	Cornwall	50.20°N 04.97°W	SW8838
Trewyn	Devon	50.81°N 04.37°W	SS3304
Tre-wyn	Monmouthshire	51.89°N 02.98°W	SO3222
Treyarnon	Cornwall	50.51°N 05.02°W	SW8673
Treyford	West Sussex	50.95°N 00.83°W	SU8218
Trezaise	Cornwall	50.39°N 04.82°W	SW9959
Trezelah	Cornwall	50.14°N 05.54°W	SW4733
