= Mullies (surname) =

Mullies is one of several variant surnames found in England, the most prevalent being MULLIS. Its first appearance is in Michaelstow Parish in Cornwall in the records of Court of Star Chamber which, in 1585, recorded individuals interchangeably as MULLYS, MULLIS, MULLES and MULLIES.<1 Court of Star Chamber, PRO B10/20 60/5,82/20/107/27. /ref>

Sixteenth-century Mullys, Mullis, Mulles and Mullies were all the same family, and as English was not standardized, various spellings are to be expected. This family surname's antecedents were variously spelled Molys, Mollys, Molis, Moles, and they were recorded between 1337 at Tintagel, five miles distant, and in 1366, 1428, 1450 and 1453, always within five to seven miles distant in neighboring parishes of Altarnun, St Clether, St Kew, St Breward, St Teath.

The Mullis surname and variants were found in locations immediate to descendants of the Norman MEULLES who were at Hastings in 1066: Baldwin FitzGilbert (aka Baldwin de Meulles/Molis) was High Sheriff of Devon in 1067 and given 100,000 acres of spoils, becoming Baron of Okehampton in Devon, where he built his castle; on nearby Devon lands of Baldwin de Meulles—alias Baldwin de Molis, de Brionne, Baldwin the Sheriff—one of his subtenants in Domesday Survey of 1086, Roger de Molis (the phonetic Latin form), founded a landed gentry family at Exbourne, Highampton, Chichicot and Lew Trenchard. Those estates were held through the year 1396, succeeding heirs recorded by various forms but most generally as MOLIS in legal documents (Inquisitiones Post Mortem, Knights Fees) from which Mulys and Molys derived by fourteenth century; by fifteenth century, two surnames in association with those ancient estates were: MULES and, finally, MULLES, MULLIS and MULLIES. All of this surname history transpired between Okehampton, Devon, and Bodmin Moor in northeastern Cornwall County—a forty-mile distance—over a 500-year timespan.

For the descent of Michaelstow Parish Mullis family from 1483: <4, Ronald A. Hill,"Using Manor Records to Document Descent: A Mullis Family of Tregreenwell Cornwall," National Genealogical Society Quarterly # 93 (2005).
