= Little Treviscoe =

Village in Cornwall, England

Coordinates: 50.365°N 4.892°W

Little Treviscoe is a village near Treviscoe in Cornwall. It contains about 30 properties. There are numerous abandoned china clay workings in the area surrounding it. In 2013 the village had issues with a cat. It has typical Cornish weather.
