= Tregarland =

Hamlet in Cornwall, England

Coordinates: 50°23′26″N 4°27′15″W

Tregarland is a hamlet in the parish of Morval, Cornwall, England.

== See also ==
- Tregarlandbridge
