= Trewethen =

Hamlet in Cornwall, England

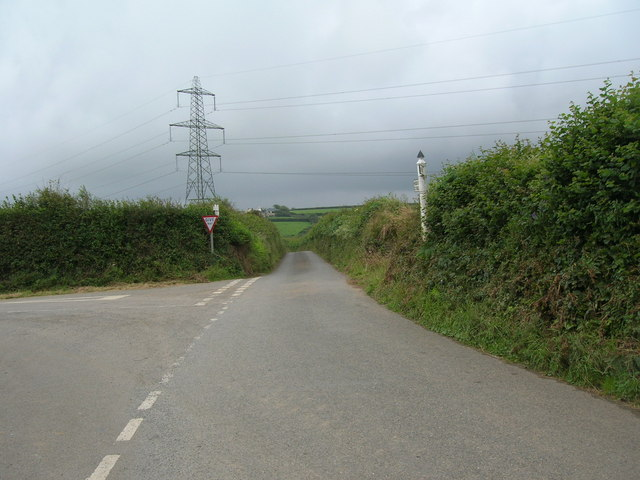
Road near Trewethen

Trewethen (Cornish: Trewydhyan) is a hamlet north of Trelill in Cornwall, England, United Kingdom.
