= Boderwennack =

Village in United Kingdom

Coordinates: 50.129°N 5.247°W

Boderwennack is a settlement, and its surrounding area in south Cornwall, England, United Kingdom. It is situated in the civil parish of Wendron half-a-mile south of Wendron village, two miles (3.5 km) north of Helston.
