= Windsor, Cornwall =

Hamlet in Cornwall, England

Coordinates: 50°20′17″N 4°33′25″W

Windsor is a hamlet in Cornwall, England, United Kingdom. It is located half-a-mile east of Lansallos village.
