= Bodulgate =

Coordinates: 50.6003°N 4.7205°W

- Civil parish: Camelford
- Unitary authority: Cornwall
- Ceremonial county: Cornwall
- Region: South West
- Country: England
- Sovereign state: United Kingdom
- Police: Devon and Cornwall
- Fire: Cornwall
- Ambulance: South Western

Bodulgate is a house in the parish of Camelford, Cornwall, England, UK.
