= Tregoose =

Farmhouse in Feock, Cornwall, England

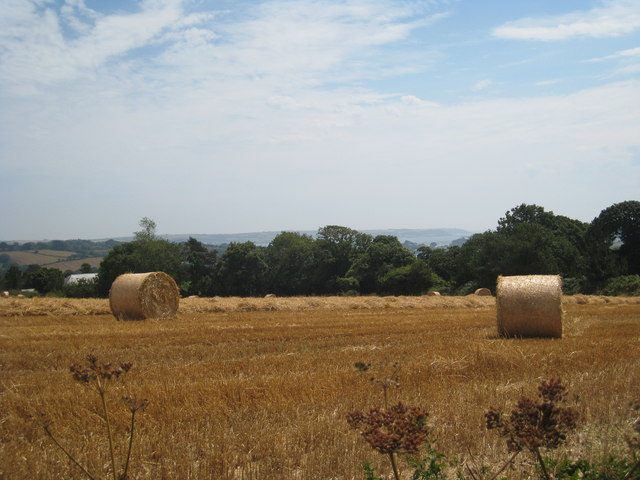
Harvesting at Tregoose

Tregoose is a farm east of Devoran, in the civil parish of Feock, Cornwall, England. The farmhouse is Grade II listed and dates from the 18th century.
