= Trenant, Cornwall =

Coordinates: 50.489°N 4.5233°W

Trenant
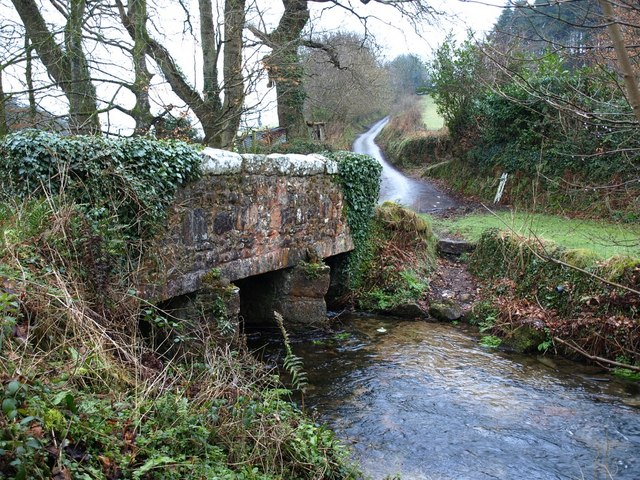
- Trenant Bridge, St Neot

- Location within Cornwall
- OS grid reference: SX211685
- Civil parish: St Neot
- Unitary authority: Cornwall
- Ceremonial county: Cornwall
- Region: South West
- Country: England
- Sovereign state: United Kingdom
- Postcode district: PL

Trenant is a hamlet in the civil parish of St Neot. There was formerly a Bible Christian chapel in Trenant.

There are also places called Trenant in the parishes of Egloshayle (near Wadebridge) and Fowey.
