= Bodella =

Hamlet in mid Cornwall, England

Coordinates: 50.37651°N 4.89356°W

Bodella is a hamlet in mid Cornwall, England, United Kingdom. It is situated half-a-mile southwest of St Dennis in an area of china clay quarries.
