= Trenean =

Hamlet in Cornwall, England

Trenean is a hamlet in the parish of Morval, Cornwall, England, United Kingdom.
