= Tremore =

Hamlet in Cornwall, England

Coordinates: 50°27′00″N 4°47′28″W

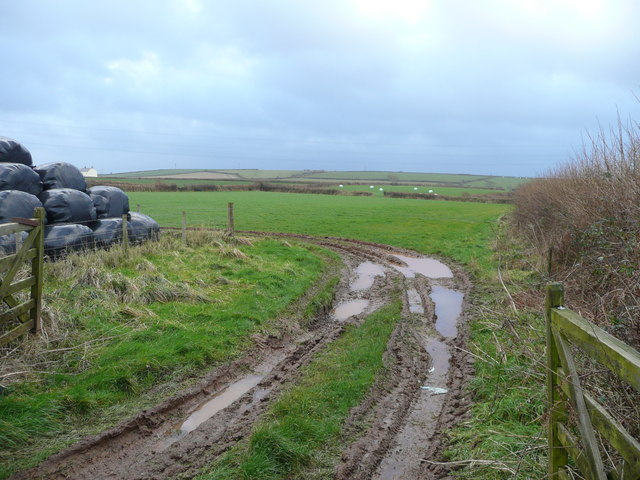
A field near Tremore

Tremore is a small hamlet in the parish of Lanivet in Cornwall, England, United Kingdom. It is very close to the border of the parishes of Lanivet and Withiel.

== See also ==
- Tremorebridge
