= Cox Hill, Cornwall =

Hamlet in Cornwall, England

Coordinates: 50.2509°N 5.1718°W

Cox Hill is a hamlet in the parish of Chacewater (where the 2011 Census population was included), Cornwall, England.
