= Trelassick =

British municipality

Coordinates: 50°20′06″N 4°59′17″W

Trelassick is a hamlet northwest of Ladock, Cornwall, England, United Kingdom.
