= Trerair =

Trerair is a hamlet near St Eval, Cornwall. It is within the Bodmin registration district and is thought to have been inhabited since at least 1837. Records first mention the hamlet by name in 1858.
