= Bodrigan =

House in Cornwall

Coordinates: 50.52928°N 4.71271°W

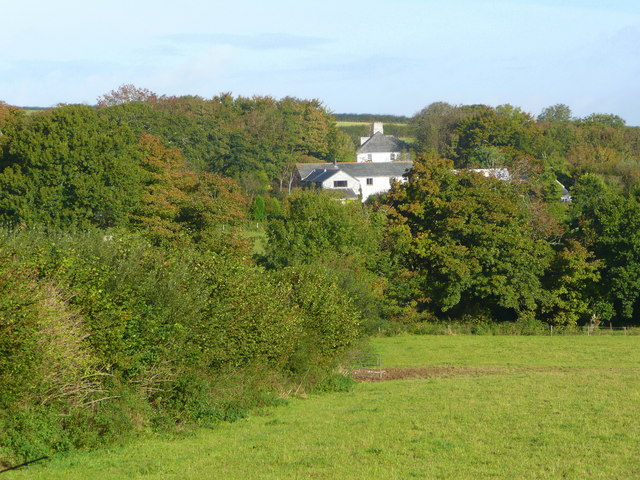
Bodrigan

Bodrigan is a settlement in the civil parish of St Tudy in Cornwall. The settlement is first recorded in 1284 and nowadays consists of a farm, cottage and other buildings, three of which have been converted into residences.
