= Treffynnon, Pembrokeshire =

Coordinates: 51°55′N 5°08′W

Treffynnon
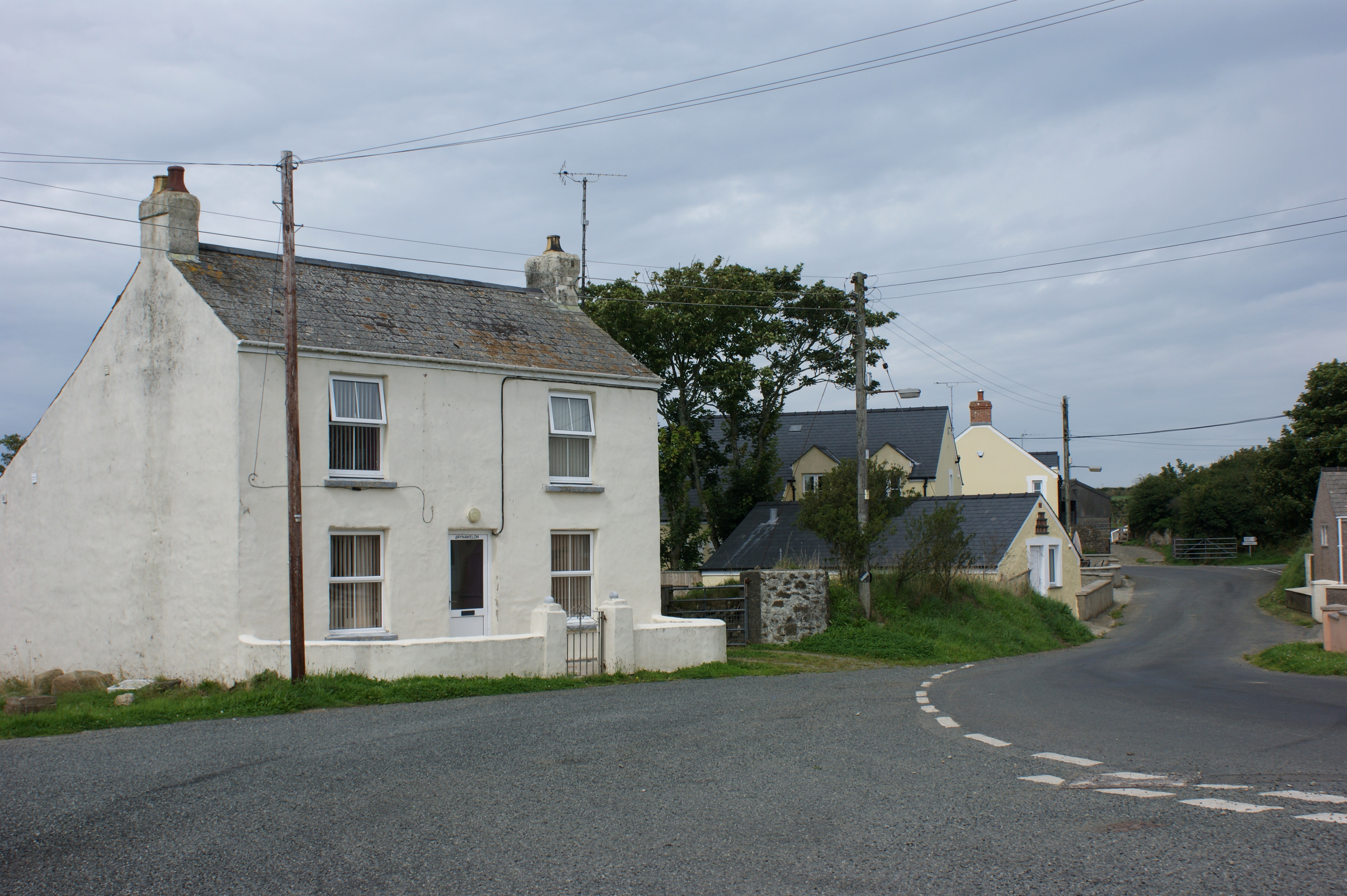

- Location within Pembrokeshire
- Community: Brawdy
- Principal area: Pembrokeshire
- Preserved county: Dyfed
- Country: Wales
- Sovereign state: United Kingdom
- Post town: Haverfordwest
- Postcode district: SA62
- Police: Dyfed-Powys
- Fire: Mid and West Wales
- Ambulance: Welsh
- UK Parliament: Preseli Pembrokeshire
- Senedd Cymru – Welsh Parliament: Preseli Pembrokeshire

For the town in North Wales see: Treffynnon, Sir y Fflint (Holywell, Flintshire)

Treffynnon (Welsh: tref - town + ffynnon - spring, well) is a hamlet of about twenty houses located in the community of Brawdy, between St Davids and Fishguard, about a mile inland from the A487 at Croesgoch in Pembrokeshire.

On the edge of the village stands Treffynnon Chapel, a Welsh Calvinistic Methodist foundation, originally built in 1867 and rebuilt in 1876. Treffynnon has only one named road with the unusual address of Council Houses, a row of six local authority dwellings dating from the 1960s known locally as The Street.
