= Tregurtha Downs =

Hamlet in Cornwall, England

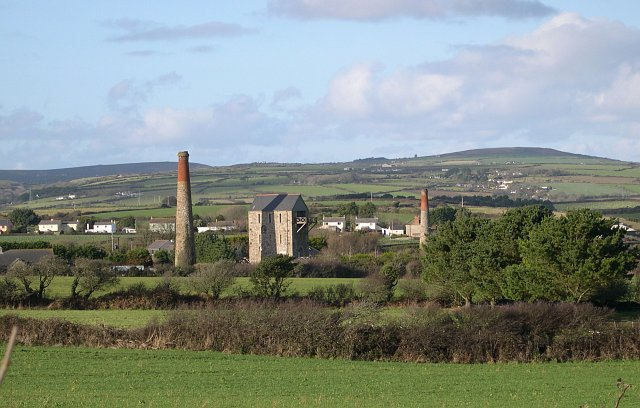
Tregurtha Downs Mine

Tregurtha Downs is a hamlet, near Goldsithney in the parish of St Hilary, Cornwall, United Kingdom and is the name of a mine opened in 1883.

The foundation stone for a new engine house was laid on 24 August 1882. The foundations and base of the 33 feet (10 m) long, 24 feet (7.3 m) wide and 90 feet (27 m) high building was built of granite blocks from a Ludgvan quarry, with the rest of the structure built of stones from nearby Trevabyn quarries. 50 feet (15 m) from the engine house, a 90 feet (27 m) high stack with walls 5 feet 6 inches (1.68 m) thick at ground level, tapering to 1 foot 10 inches (0.56 m) at the top, was built from the same stone, to give draught to four large boilers which supplies steam for the 80-inch pumping engine. The engine was made at Copperhouse, by Sandys, Vivian and Co and previously worked in mines at Crenver and Abraham in the parish of Crowan. It was named ″St Aubyn″ after one of the directors, William Molesworth-St Aubyn, MP for Helston, when it was first fired on 27 March 1883.

By July 1883, Tregurtha and Owen Vean were producing 5 tons of tin a month and in June 1884 an estimated 80 tons of tinstone could be crushed every 24 hours with the opening of the new stamps. The following year the mine was amalgamated with Owen Vean and on 18 April 1885 the mine closed and was put up for sale; forty to fifty men, unpaid for many weeks, were out of work causing hardship for their families. The 80-inch pumping engine and other machinery was put up for auction on 19 June 1885.

The mine restarted in 1888, but early in the morning of 4 January 1889, a fire in the engine house destroyed the timber and part of the pumping engine, putting 250+ men, women and boys out of work. The timber was replaced and the engine repaired, in nine days, by voluntary labour. The Cornishman newspaper described the volunteers thus, ″Every one has worked as good men do work—not for wages only but for their own repute and the good of their employers″.
