= Tremedda =

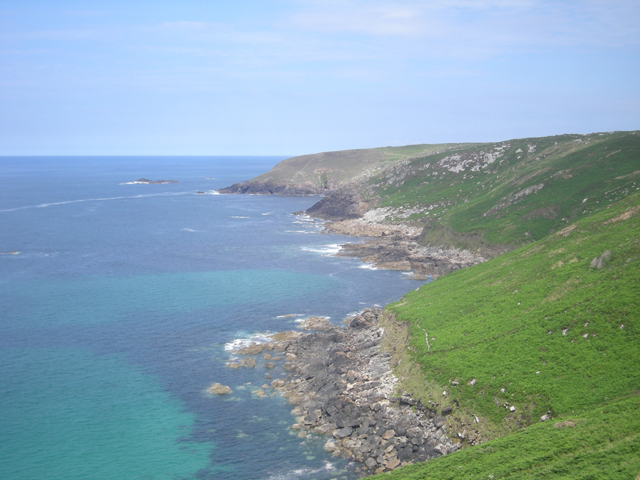
Tremedda cliffs and Gala Rocks

Tremedda is a hamlet in the parish of Zennor, Cornwall, England, United Kingdom.
