= Tregarne =

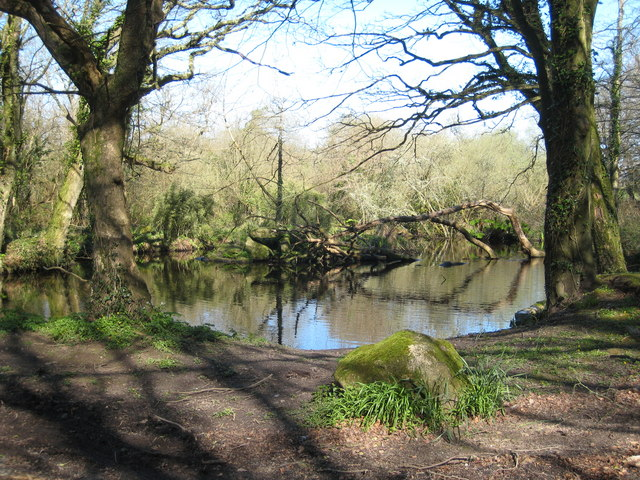
Former mill pond at Tregarne

Higher Tregarne and Lower Tregarne are two hamlets northwest of Mawnan Smith, Cornwall, England, United Kingdom.
