= Trevarren =

Hamlet in Cornwall, England

Coordinates: 50°24′07″N 04°56′16″W

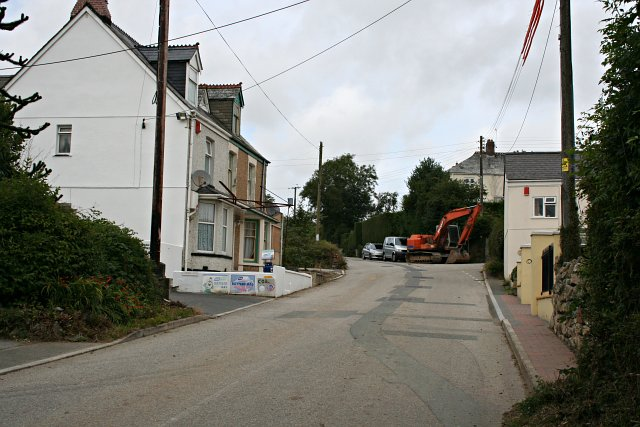
Trevarren

Trevarren is a hamlet north of Indian Queens in Cornwall, United Kingdom.
