= Trevelver =

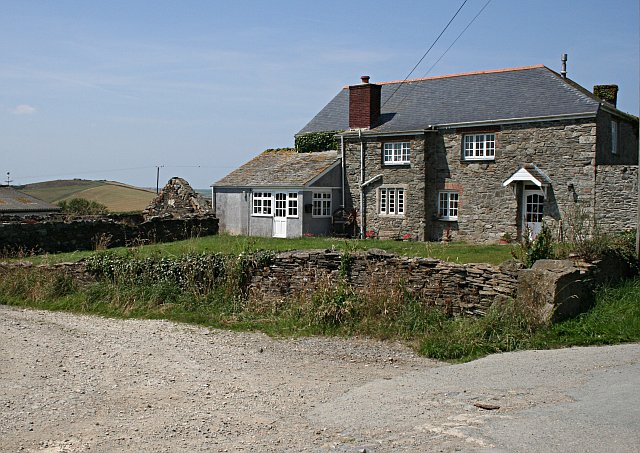
Trevelver

Trevelver is a hamlet in the parish of St Minver, Cornwall, England, United Kingdom.

Trevelver lies within the Cornwall Area of Outstanding Natural Beauty (AONB). Almost a third of Cornwall has AONB designation, with the same status and protection as a National Park.
