= Treningle =

Treningle is a hamlet in the parish of Lanivet, Cornwall, England, United Kingdom.
