= Tregorden =

Tregorden is a hamlet in the parish of Egloshayle, Cornwall, England, United Kingdom.
