= Tresavean =

Tresavean is a hamlet in the parish of Lanner, Cornwall, England, United Kingdom.
