= Trevowah =

Hamlet in Cornwall, England

Trevowah (Cornish: Trevewa) is a hamlet south of Crantock in Cornwall, England, United Kingdom.
