= Treskerby =

Coordinates: 50.2468°N 5.2035°W

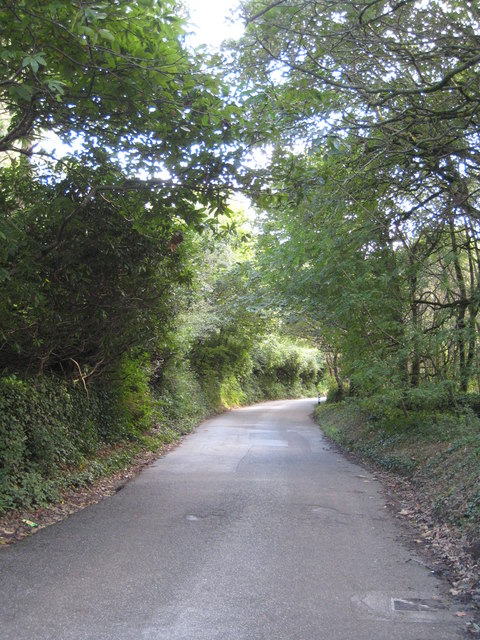
Road near Treskerby

Treskerby is a hamlet south of Scorrier in west Cornwall, England, United Kingdom.
