= Treliver =

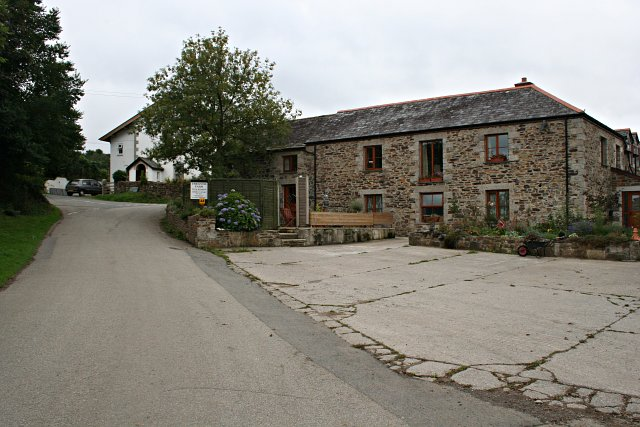
Treliver

Treliver is a hamlet in the parish of St Wenn, Cornwall, England, United Kingdom.
