= Trevemper =

Coordinates: 50.3941°N 5.07459°W

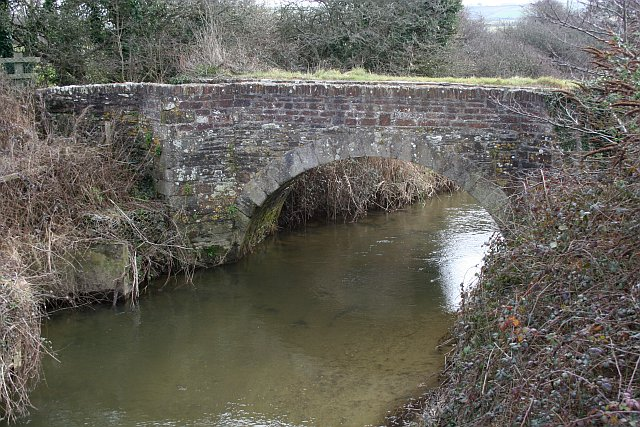
The old bridge at Trevemper

Trevemper (Cornish: Tregemper, meaning farmstead at the confluence) is a hamlet to the south of Newquay, Cornwall, United Kingdom, on the west bank of the River Gannel at the rivers lowest bridging point.

Coal was shipped from Wales to the River Gannel and unloaded at Trevemper and Penpol Creek during the 18th century, and transported to the smelting works at Truro.

Trevemper Bridge crosses the River Gannel, and was built in the early 19th century to replace the old packhorse bridge, first mentioned in 1613, which may date back to the 16th century. Historic England have registered the bridge as a Grade II listed building and an Ancient Monument. Two arches were washed away by storm-water in 1839 and the bridge was consequently repaired with only one arch. It was closed to traffic in 1939 after a larger bridge had been built nearby in 1925, which carries the A3075 Trevemper to Chiverton Cross, Blackwater.

Nearby is another ancient monument, Trevemper Mill.
