= Trerise =

Hamlet in Cornwall, England

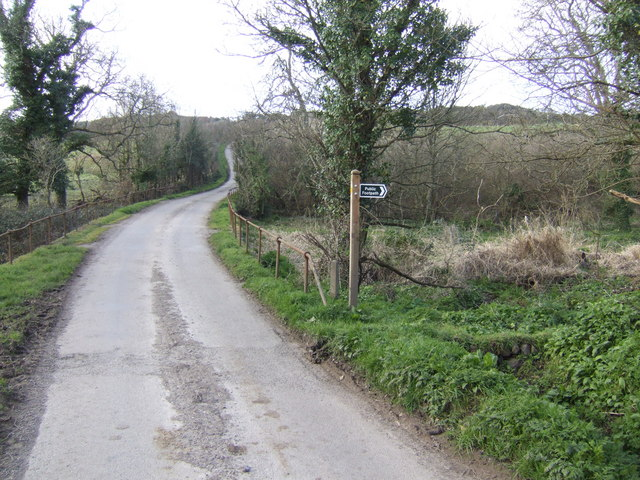
Lane from Trerise to Tresaddern

Trerise is a hamlet in the parish of Grade-Ruan, Cornwall, England, United Kingdom.
