= Trezelah =

Hamlet in Cornwall, England

Trezelah: Cornish: Treseghla
- Hamlet
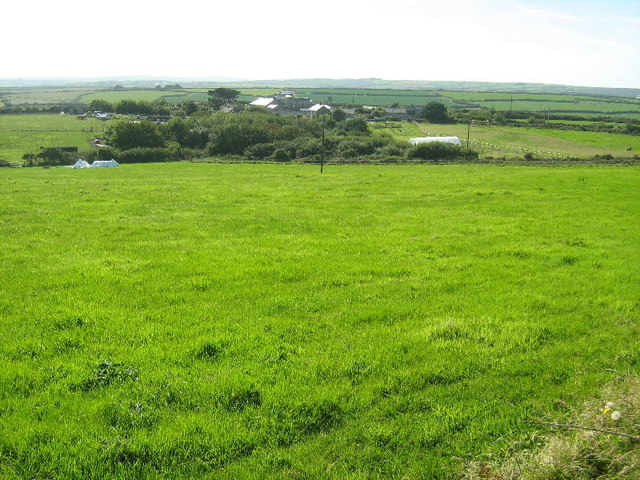

- Location within Cornwall
- Unitary authority: Cornwall
- Region: South West
- Country: England
- Sovereign state: United Kingdom
- Police: Devon and Cornwall
- Fire: Cornwall
- Ambulance: South Western

Trezelah (Cornish: Treseghla, meaning farmstead of the dry place) is a hamlet north of Penzance in Cornwall, England, United Kingdom.
