= Trethillick =

Hamlet in Cornwall, England

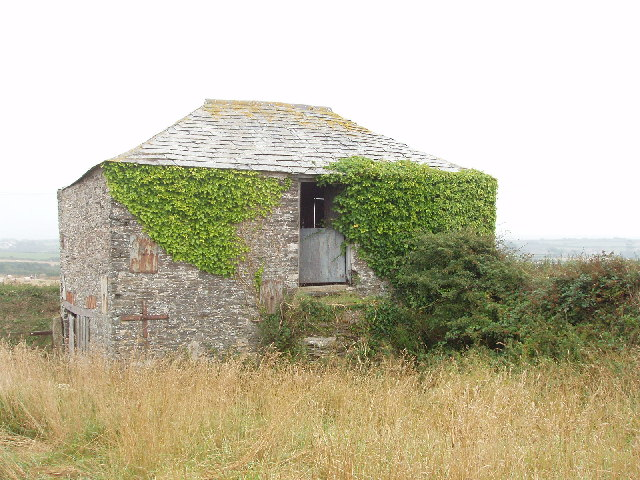
Field barn at Trethillick

Trethillick is a hamlet between Padstow and Crugmeer in Cornwall, England, United Kingdom.
