= Trevilson =

Hamlet in Cornwall, England

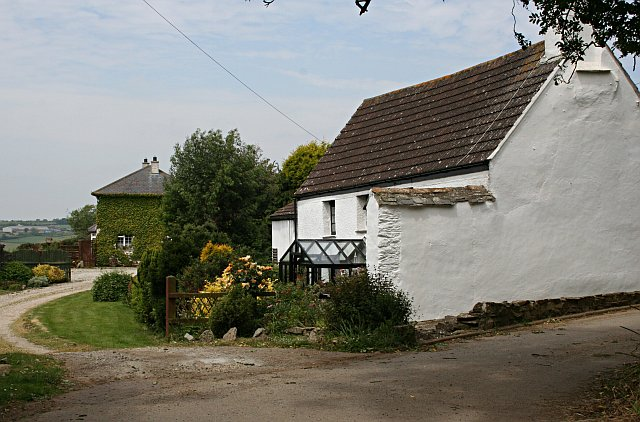
Trevilson

Trevilson is a hamlet in the parish of St Newlyn East, Cornwall, England, United Kingdom.

The hamlet features the St. Tudy Inn, the St. Tudy Church and the Trevilson Manor House.
