= Tregellist =

Hamlet in England

Coordinates: 50°33′55″N 4°48′49″W

Tregellist is a hamlet in the parish of St Kew, Cornwall, England, United Kingdom.
