= Trenance =

Hamlet in Cornwall, England

Coordinates: 50°28′20″N 5°01′40″W

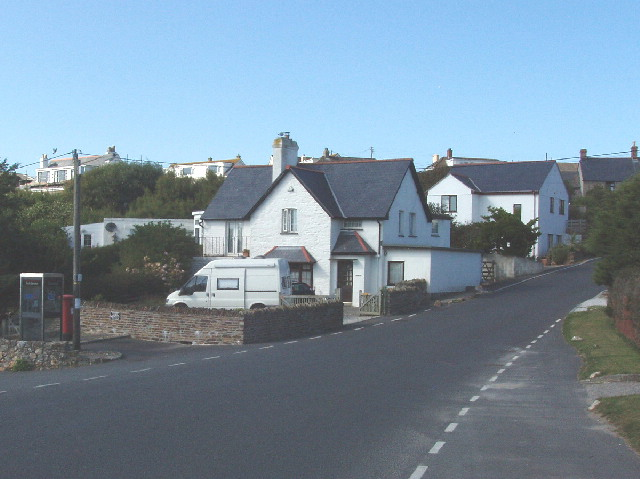
Houses at Trenance

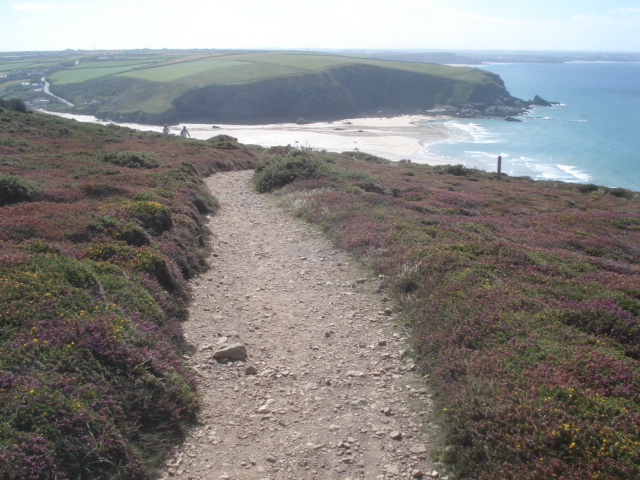
The coast path at Trenance Point

Trenance (Cornish: Trenans) is a hamlet adjoining Mawgan Porth in Cornwall, England, United Kingdom. Trenance Point is a headland nearby.

There are also places called Trenance in the parishes of Mullion, Newquay, St Issey, St Keverne and St Wenn. The meaning of Trenance is "valley farm".

The manor of Trenance in St Keverne was recorded in the Domesday Book (1086) when it was held by Algar from Robert, Count of Mortain. There was one hide of land and land for 6 ploughs. There were 2 ploughs, 6 serfs, 2 villeins, 9 smallholders, 100 acres of pasture, 2 cattle, and 37 sheep. The value of the manor was 15 shillings, though it had formerly been worth 2 pounds (40 shillings).
