= Trewetha =

Hamlet in Cornwall, England

Coordinates: 50°35′11″N 4°49′12″W

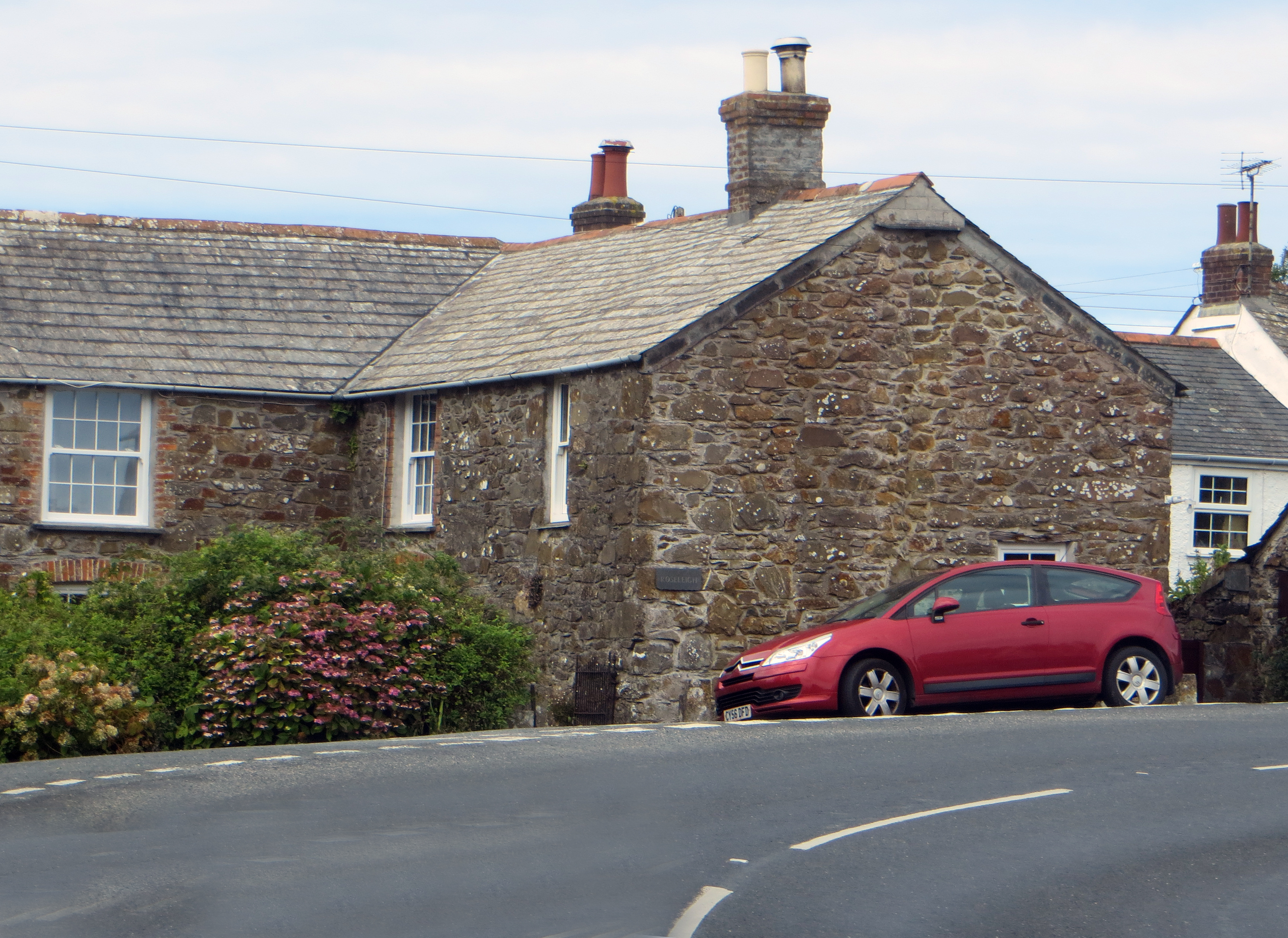
- The B3267

- Location within Cornwall
- Civil parish: St Endellion
- Unitary authority: Cornwall
- Ceremonial county: Cornwall
- Region: South West
- Country: England
- Sovereign state: United Kingdom

Trewetha is a hamlet in the parish of St Endellion, Cornwall, England, United Kingdom. There was a mine at Trewetha known as Wheal Boys.
