= Treworld =

Treworld is a hamlet west of Lesnewth, Cornwall, England, United Kingdom.
