= Trequite =

Coordinates: 50°33′33″N 4°47′14″W

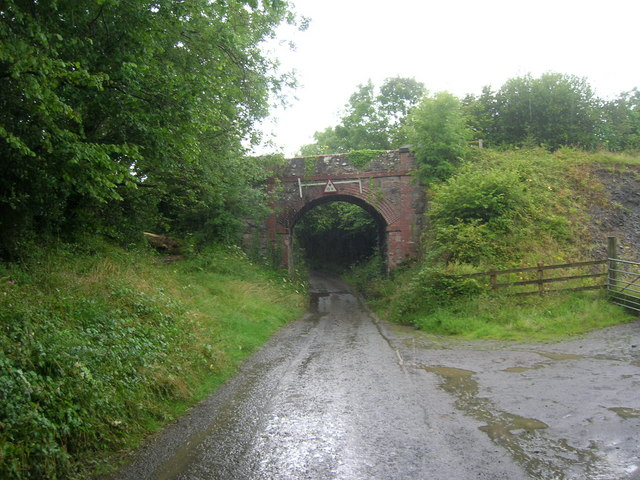
Trequite railway bridge

Trequite is a hamlet in the parish of St Kew, Cornwall, England, United Kingdom. It is half a mile east of St Kew.

The farm at Trequite has a circular building attached known as the 'roundhouse'. This was a horse mill used when there was no water to power the water wheel.

Despite its small size, there was a Methodist chapel in Trequite. Built in the late 1860s on land leased for the purpose by Lord Robartes, it closed in the first quarter of the 20th Century and was converted to residential use.
