= Treloquithack =

Human settlement in Cornwall, United Kingdom

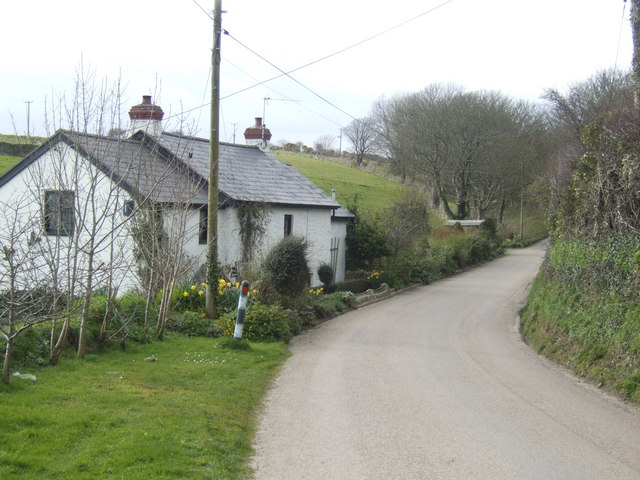
Treloquithack

Treloquithack is a hamlet northeast of Helston, Cornwall, England, United Kingdom.
