= Tresoweshill =

Hamlet in Cornwall, England

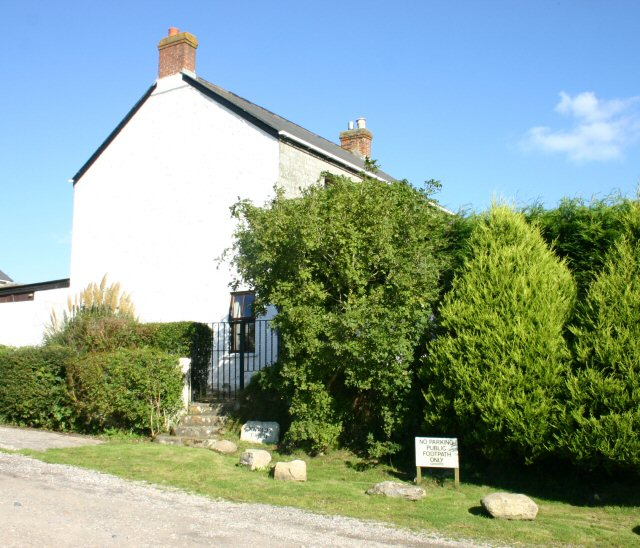
Nevada Farm

Tresoweshill is a hamlet in the civil parish of Germoe in west Cornwall, England, United Kingdom.
