= Trebilcock, Cornwall =

Hamlet in Cornwall, England

Trebilcock is a hamlet in the parish of Roche, Cornwall, England, United Kingdom.
