= Tramagenna =

Hamlet in Cornwall, England

Tramagenna is a hamlet southwest of Camelford, Cornwall, England, United Kingdom.
