= Trewartha, Cornwall =

Hamlet in Cornwall, England

Coordinates: 50°13′15″N 4°54′33″W

Trewartha
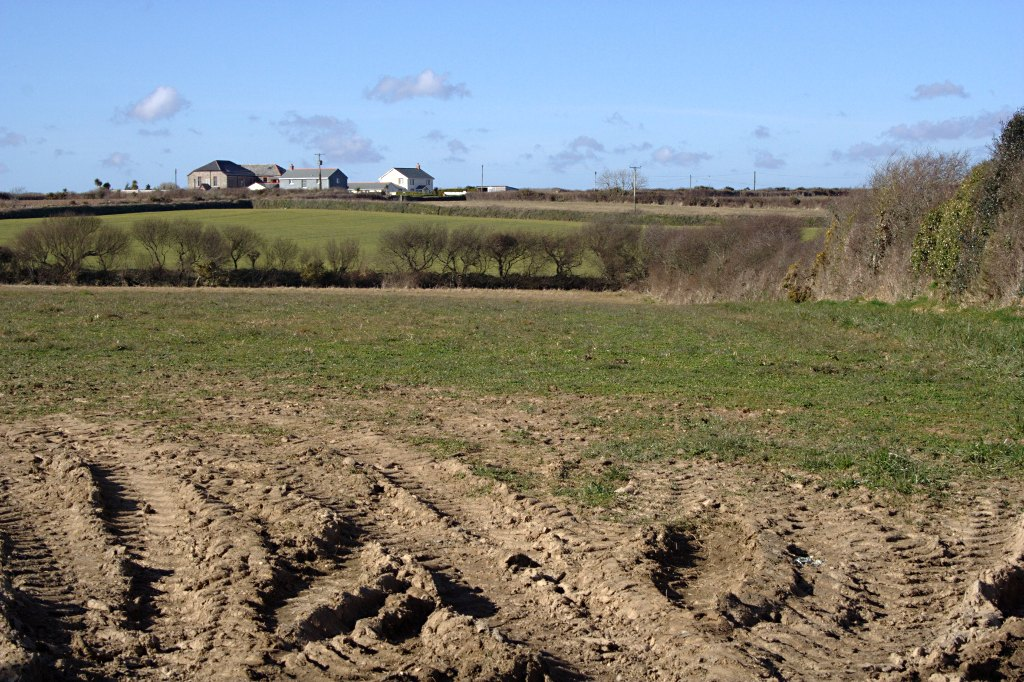
- Trewartha, Veryan

- Location within Cornwall
- Civil parish: Veryan
- Unitary authority: Cornwall
- Ceremonial county: Cornwall
- Region: South West
- Country: England
- Sovereign state: United Kingdom
- Police: Devon and Cornwall
- Fire: Cornwall
- Ambulance: South Western

Trewartha is a hamlet in the civil parish of Veryan on the Roseland Peninsula, Cornwall, England, United Kingdom.

Trewartha is also the name of places in the parishes of Merther, St Agnes and St Neot. The meaning of Trewartha is "higher farm", except in the case of Trewartha, Merther, which is "Gorou's farm".

== See also ==
- Trewartha (the surname)
