= Trendeal =

Trendeal is a hamlet in the parish of Ladock, Cornwall, England, United Kingdom.
