= Treath =

Hamlet in Cornwall, England

Coordinates: 50°05′36″N 5°07′51″W

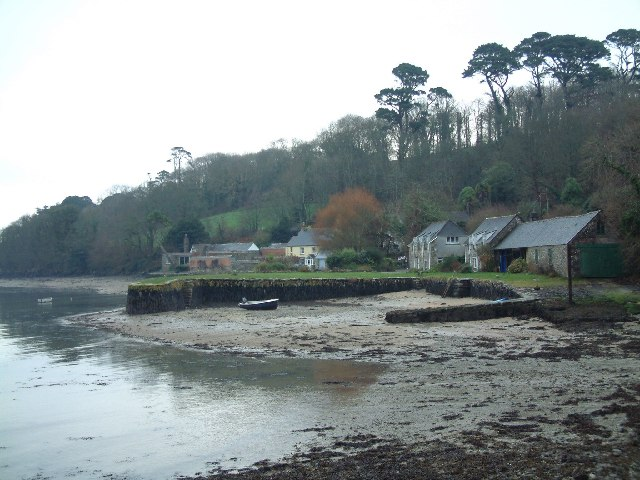
Treath

Treath is a hamlet east of Helford, Cornwall, England, United Kingdom. Made 1200
