= Trehunist =

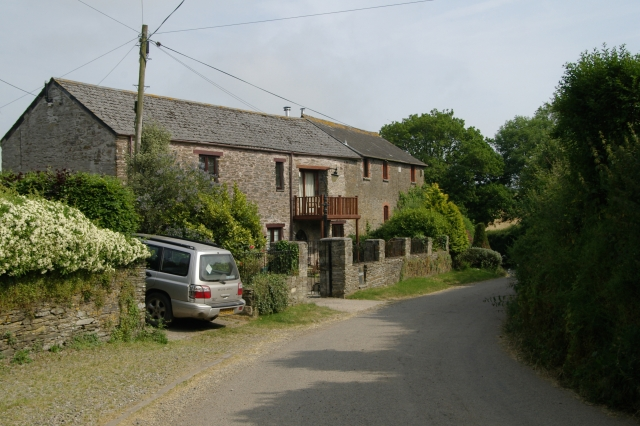
Trehunist

Trehunist (Cornish: Trenanast) is a hamlet in the parish of Quethiock, Cornwall, England, United Kingdom.
