= Trezaise =

Village in Cornwall, England

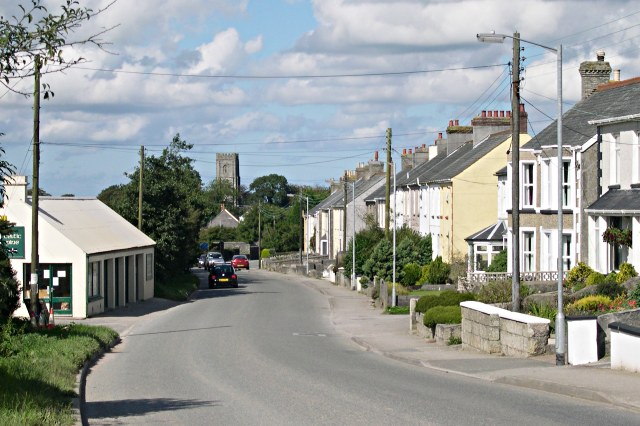
Trezaise

Trezaise (Cornish: Treseys) is a hamlet south of Roche, Cornwall, England, United Kingdom.
