= Trenay =

Hamlet in Cornwall, England

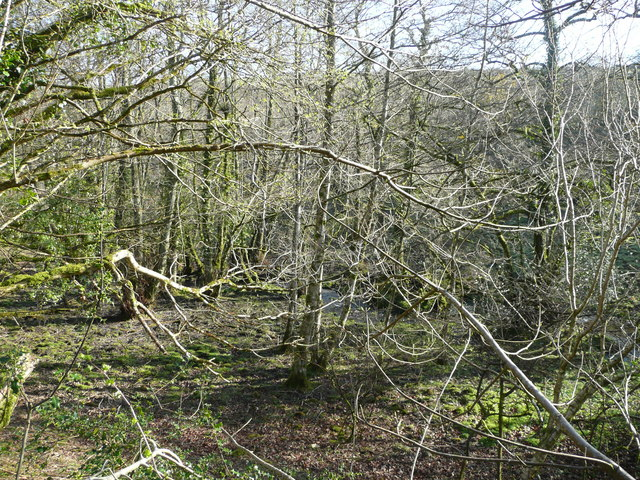
A deep wooded valley near Trenay

Trenay is a hamlet in the parish of St Neot, Cornwall, England, United Kingdom.
