= Treninnick =

Suburb of Newquay, Cornwall, England

Coordinates: 50.4057°N 5.0713°W

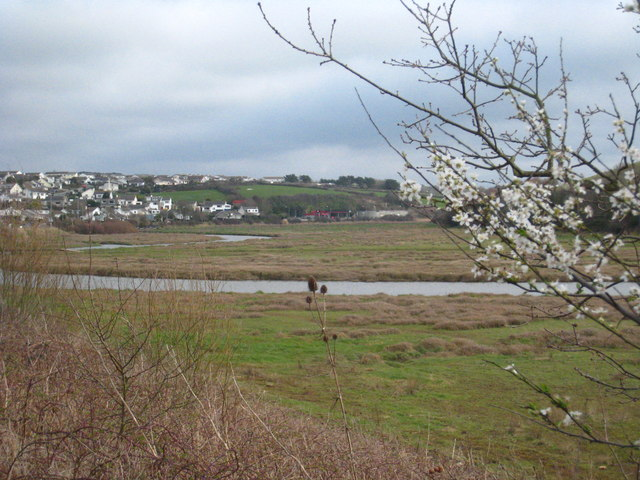
Treninnick

Treninnick is a southeastern suburb of Newquay, Cornwall, England, United Kingdom, near Trencreek. It is in the civil parish of Newquay .
