= Treburgie =

Hamlet in Cornwall, England

Treburgie is a hamlet in the civil parish of Dobwalls, Cornwall, England, United Kingdom.
