= Trevarth =

Hamlet in Cornwall, England

Coordinates: 50°13′16″N 5°11′16″W

Trevarth (Cornish: Trevargh) is a hamlet in the parish of Lanner, Cornwall, England, United Kingdom. The name Trevarth comes from the Cornish language words tre, meaning 'farm' or 'settlement', and margh, meaning 'horse', an element it shares with nearby Carn Marth.
