= Treburgett =

Hamlet in Cornwall, England

Coordinates: 50°34′56″N 4°44′55″W

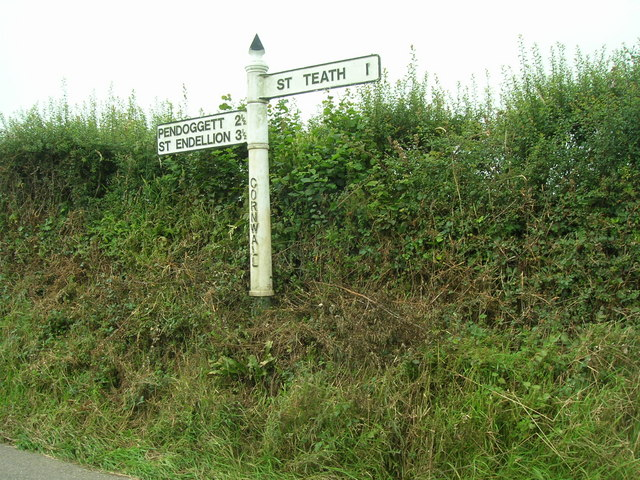
Signpost near Treburgett

Treburgett is a hamlet in the parish of St Teath, Cornwall, England, United Kingdom.

Treburgett Mine (grid reference SX055796) was a lead and silver mine about 1 km south-west of St Teath Churchtown. In 1881 it was reported, in The Cornishman newspaper, that the old mine was to be restarted, with 60,000 £1 shares. Between 1871 and 1881, 2,180 pounds (990 kg) of 75% lead ore and 9,530 ounces (270,000 g) of silver ore was extracted. Also mined was 44 tons of zinc ore, 120 tons of pyrite and 62 tons of iron ore, as well as carminate (a lead iron arsenic mineral), galena, lead sulphide, limonite, siderite (iron carbonate) and zinc sulphide.
