= Tregadgwith =

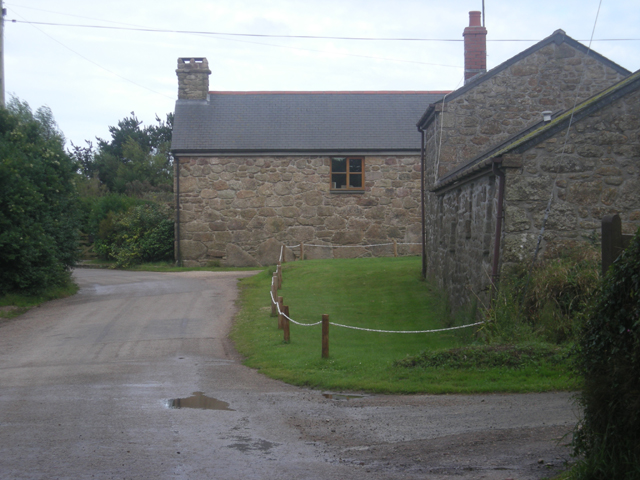
Tregadgwith

Tregadgwith is a hamlet east of St Buryan, Cornwall, England, United Kingdom.
