= Treworlas =

Hamlet in Cornwall, England

Coordinates: 50.2097°N 4.9546°W

Treworlas is a hamlet west of Veryan, Cornwall, England, United Kingdom, part of the civil parish of Philleigh.

Henry Jenner suggested that Treworlas was named after Gorlois, the legendary duke of Cornwall, who he believed was a real fifth or sixth century figure, either a petty chief who was a vassal of the Royal House of Dumnonia, or – if the leaders of the Britons that had been displaced from the rest of England by the Saxons had become the kings of Dumnonia – Gorlois may have been of the line of the original chiefs of the Dumnonii that had been supplanted by these displaced Britons.
