= Tresamble =

Tresamble is a hamlet in the parish of Gwennap, Cornwall, England, United Kingdom.
