= Tregamere =

Coordinates: 50°26′46″N 4°55′06″W

Tregamere is a hamlet in the parish of St Columb Major, Cornwall, England, United Kingdom, about 1 km northeast of the town of St Columb Major.
