= Treworrick =

Treworrick is a hamlet in the parish of St Cleer, Cornwall, England, United Kingdom.
