= Trewollock =

Trewollock is a hamlet north of Gorran Haven, Cornwall, England, United Kingdom.
