= Trehemborne =

Trehemborne is a hamlet in the parish of St Merryn, Cornwall, England, United Kingdom.
