= Treveor =

Treveor is a hamlet west of Gorran Haven, Cornwall, England, United Kingdom.
