= Treamble =

Hamlet in Cornwall, England

Treamble is a hamlet northeast of Perranporth, Cornwall, England, United Kingdom.
