= Tregonna =

Hamlet in St Issey, Cornwall, United Kingdom

Tregonna is a hamlet in Cornwall, England. It is a birding site where people can watch birds. As of 2024, it has four listed buildings including Tregonna House and Molesworth Manor.
