= Tredannick =

Tredannick is a hamlet in the parish of Egloshayle, Cornwall, England, United Kingdom.
