= Trewint =

Hamlet in Cornwall, England

Coordinates: 50°35′53″N 4°30′58″W

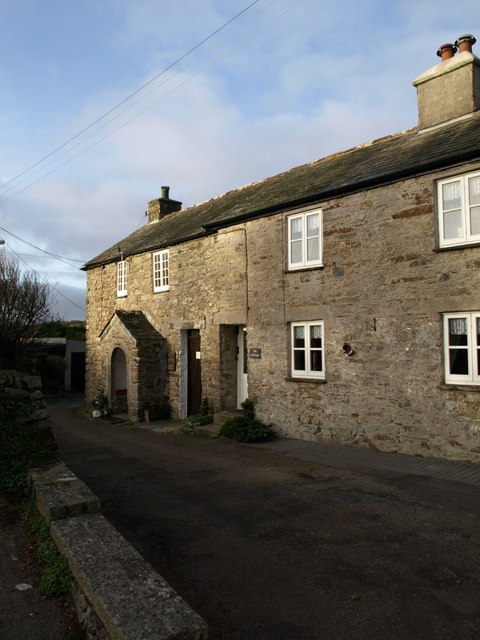
Digory Isbell's cottage, Trewint

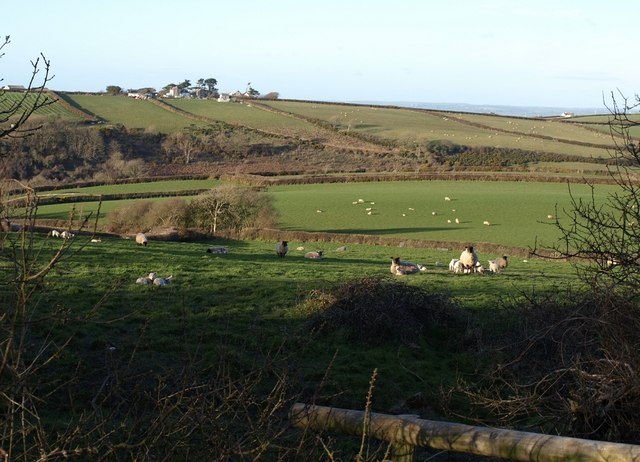
Trewint, Poundstock

Trewint (Cornish: Trewyns) is a hamlet in the civil parish of Altarnun, east Cornwall, England, United Kingdom. The hamlet is just off the A30 main road, and is south of the village of Altarnun. Trewint Downs, part of Bodmin Moor, are further west.

The manor of Trewint was recorded in the Domesday Book (1086) when it was held by Roger from Mortain. There was 1 virgate of land and land for 1 plough. There were 1 serf, 4 smallholders, 2 acres of pasture and 10 sheep. The value of the manor was 5 shillings though it had formerly been worth 10 shillings.

John Wesley often visited Trewint, lodging in Digory Isbell's home which is now a museum of Wesley and Methodism.

Trewint is also the name of places in the parishes of Blisland and Poundstock. The meaning of Trewint is "windy farm", though Trewint, Blisland (Tyrwynt) means "windy land".

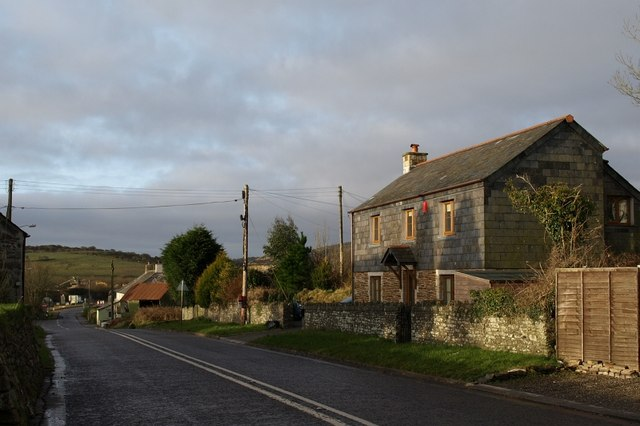
Trewint

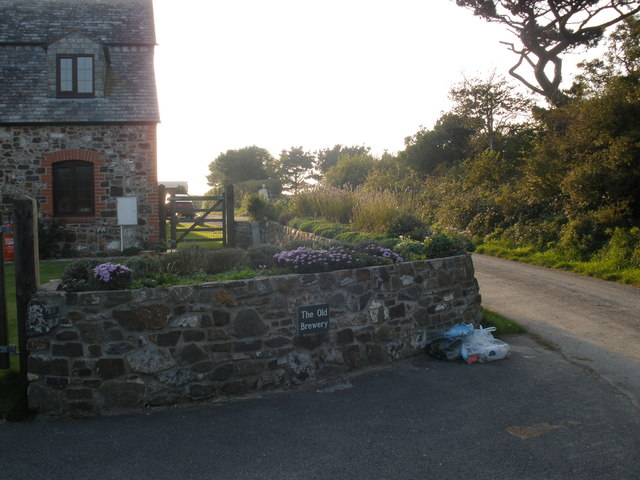
The Old Brewery, Trewint

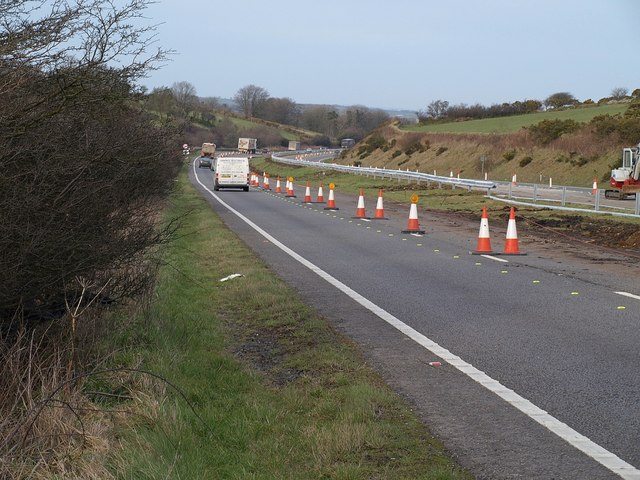
A30 near Trewint
