= Trekeivesteps =

Hamlet in Cornwall, England

Coordinates: 50.5028°N 4.5014°W

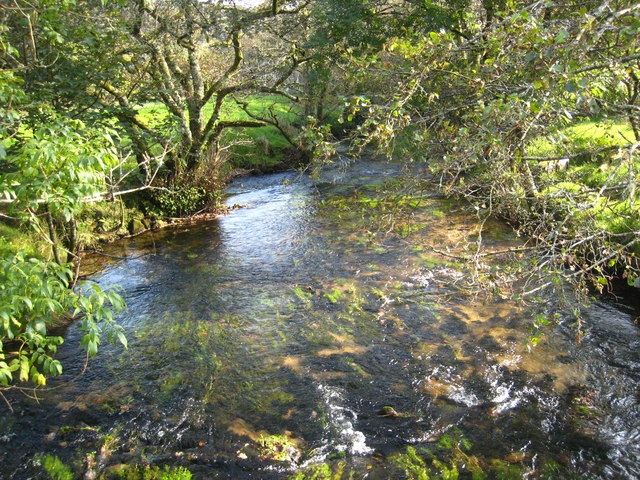
The River Fowey at Trekeivesteps

Trekeivesteps (Cornish: Grisyow Trenkyf) is a hamlet in the parish of St Cleer in Cornwall, England, United Kingdom. It is in the valley of the River Fowey between North Trekeive and South Trekeive.
