= Trewindle =

Trewindle is a hamlet west of West Taphouse, Cornwall, England, United Kingdom.
