= Trethellan Water =

Coordinates: 50.2026°N 5.2004°W

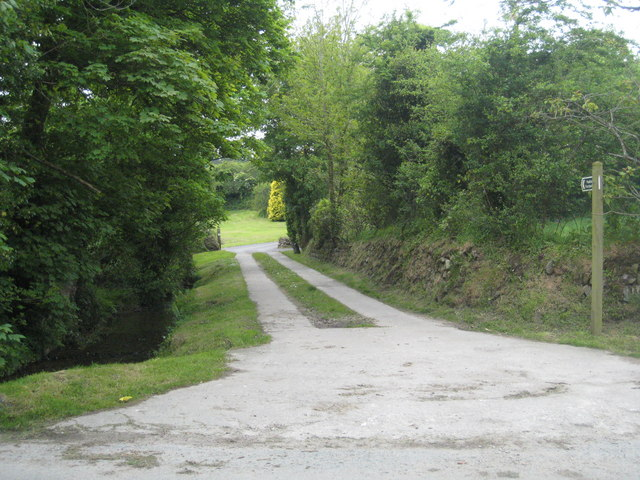
A public bridleway at Trethellan Water

Trethellan Water is a hamlet south of Lanner, Cornwall, England, United Kingdom.
