= Treswithian Downs =

Hamlet in Cornwall, England

Coordinates: 50.2235°N 5.3259°W

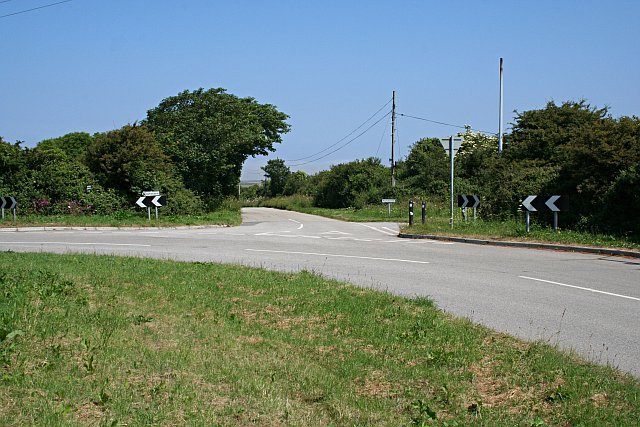
Road junction near Treswithian Downs

Treswithian Downs is a hamlet north of Treswithian, Cornwall, England, United Kingdom.
