= Trewornan =

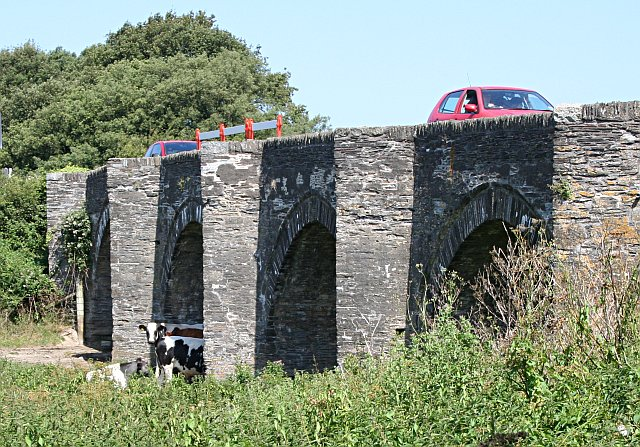
- Trewornan Bridge

- Location within Cornwall
- Shire county: Cornwall
- Region: South West
- Country: England
- Sovereign state: United Kingdom
- Post town: Wadebridge
- Postcode district: PL27
- Police: Devon and Cornwall
- Fire: Cornwall
- Ambulance: South Western

Trewornan is a hamlet north west of Wadebridge, Cornwall, England, United Kingdom. It is on the B3314 main coast road that links Wadebridge to the tourist areas of Rock, Polzeath and Port Isaac.

== Location ==
Today Trewornan consists of a small group of buildings around Trewornan Manor and Trewornan Farm, and previous Ordnance Survey maps indicate that this has not changed since the 19th century. In 2022 Google Maps showed the label "Trewornan" located at Middle Amble ( 50.540345°N 4.839830°W) leading to possible confusion about the location to which the name applies.

== Industry ==
A small copper mine called Trewornan Mine was located along the River Camel between Trewornan and Dinham. It operated from the early 1800s and was later known as Wheal Sisters. It was only worked for about 50 years before mining ceased.

== Trewornan Bridge ==
The most distinct feature at Trewornan is Trewornan Bridge which spans the River Amble. The bridge was built in the 18th century and is Grade II listed. This bridge is well known to drivers on the B3314 as in 2022 it is still single file and is protected by traffic lights. In May 2022 the bridge was struck by a vehicle which caused significant damage to the parapet and the B3314 was closed. Repairs were predicted to take several weeks and local bus services were affected.

Between 2010 and 2017 the Environment Agency carried out water quality sampling at Trewornan Bridge, the last sample being taken in April 2017.
