= Trelion =

Hamlet in Cornwall, England

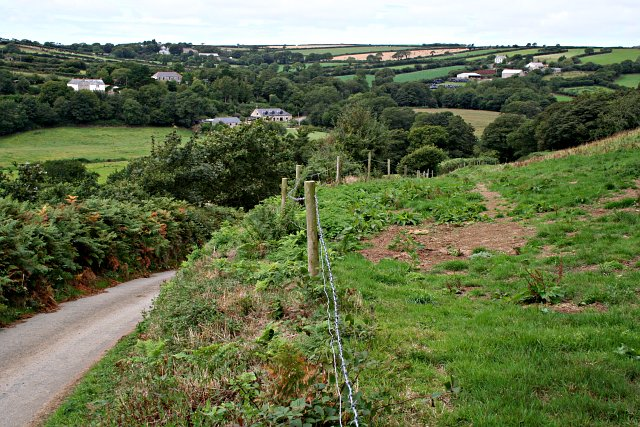
The Fal Valley by Trelion

Trelion (Cornish: Treleghyon) is a hamlet southwest of St Stephen in Brannel in Cornwall, England, United Kingdom.
