= Tredavoe =

Coordinates: 50°06′08″N 5°33′37″W

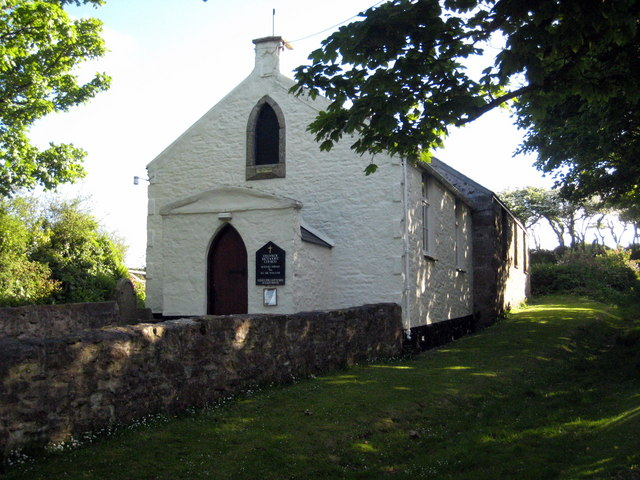
Tredavoe Methodist Church

Tredavoe (Cornish: Trewordhavow) is a hamlet west of Newlyn in Cornwall, England, United Kingdom.
