= Treworthal =

Coordinates: 50.2125°N 4.9703°W

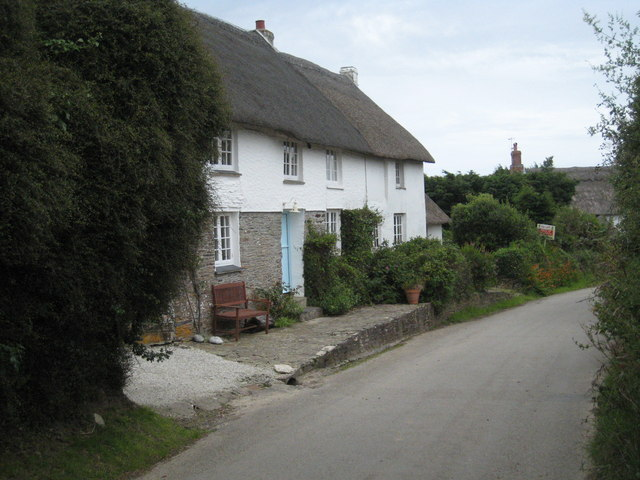
Thatched cottages at Treworthal

Treworthal is a hamlet in the parish of Philleigh, Cornwall, England, United Kingdom.
