= Trenerth =

Hamlet in Cornwall, England

Trenerth is a hamlet in the parish of Gwinear-Gwithian, Cornwall, England, United Kingdom.
