= Trevine, Cornwall =

Hamlet in Cornwall, England

Coordinates: 50°33′17.52″N 4°50′7.6″W

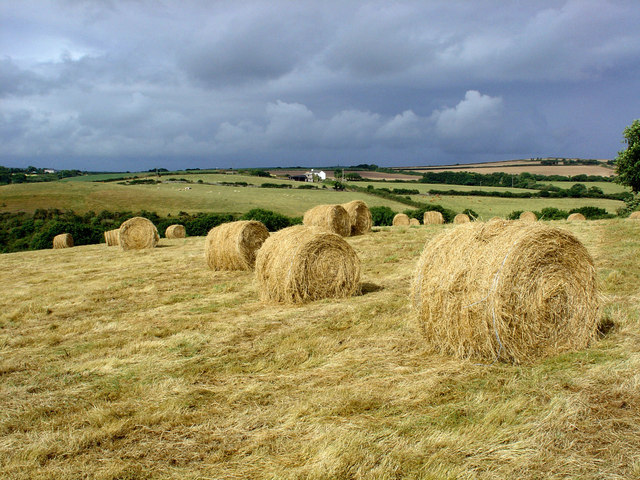
View over fields of Rooke Farm towards Smeathers Farm close to Trevine

Trevine is a hamlet 2 km east of St Minver in north Cornwall, England, United Kingdom.
