= Tregear, Cornwall =

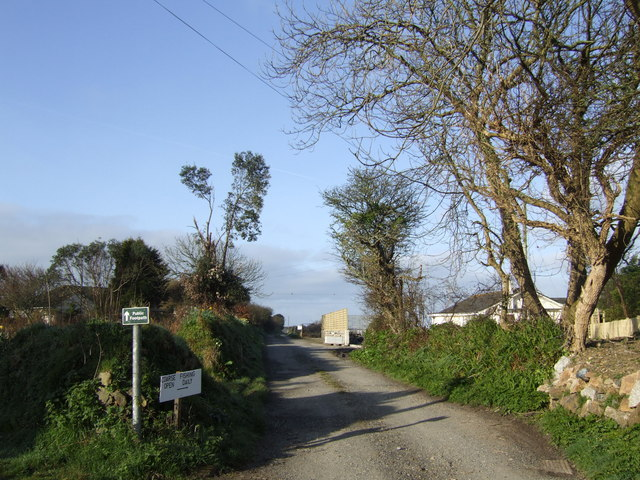
The road to Tregear

Tregear is a hamlet near Garras in the parish of Mawgan in Meneage, Cornwall, England, United Kingdom. It should be distinguished from Tregear in the parish of Gerrans.
