= Tresawle =

Tresawle is a hamlet east of Tresillian, Cornwall, England, United Kingdom.
