= Trevithal =

Coordinates: 50°05′09″N 5°32′53″W

Trevithal (grid reference SW462266) is a hamlet in Penzance, Cornwall, England, United Kingdom.
