= Trevalgan =

Hamlet in Cornwall, England

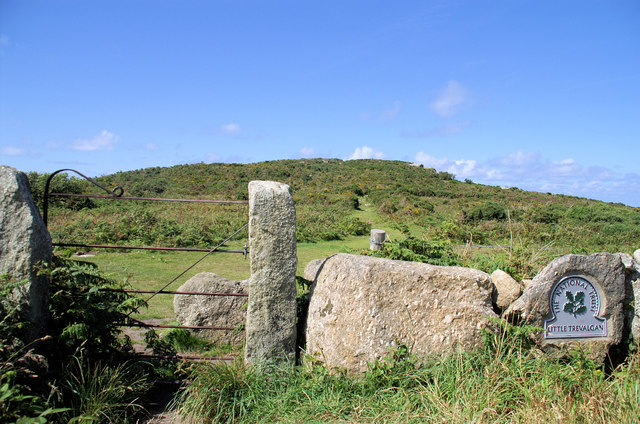
Little Trevalgan (National Trust)

Trevalgan (from Cornish: Trevalgon, meaning "Maelgon's settlement") is a hamlet in the parish of Saint Ives, Cornwall, England, United Kingdom.
