= Trevegean =

Hamlet in Cornwall, England

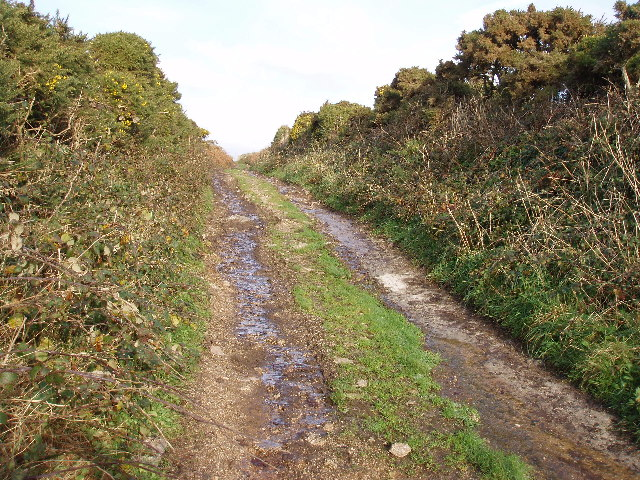
Farm lane to Trevegean

Trevegean (from Cornish: Trevujyon, meaning "farm of the chaff") is a hamlet south of St Just, Cornwall, England, United Kingdom. Trevegean Downs are west of the B3306 main road.
