= Tresarrett =

Coordinates: 50°31′35″N 4°41′48″W

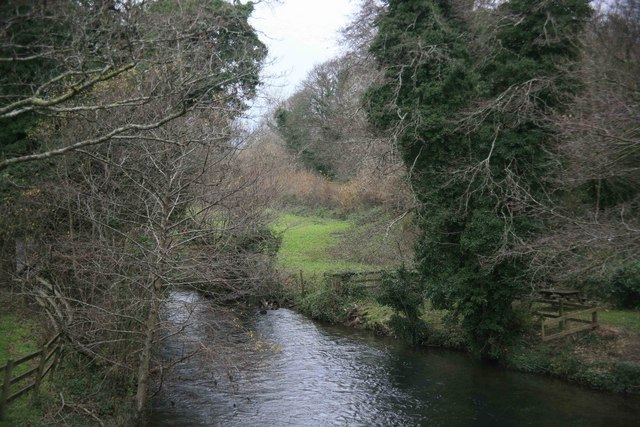
The River Camel at Tresarrett

Tresarrett is a hamlet in the parish of Blisland, Cornwall, England, United Kingdom. It is in the valley of the River Camel south of Wenfordbridge.
