= Trewennan =

Trewennan is a hamlet near St Teath, Cornwall, England, United Kingdom.
