= Tregada =

Coordinates: 50°36′32″N 4°20′13″W

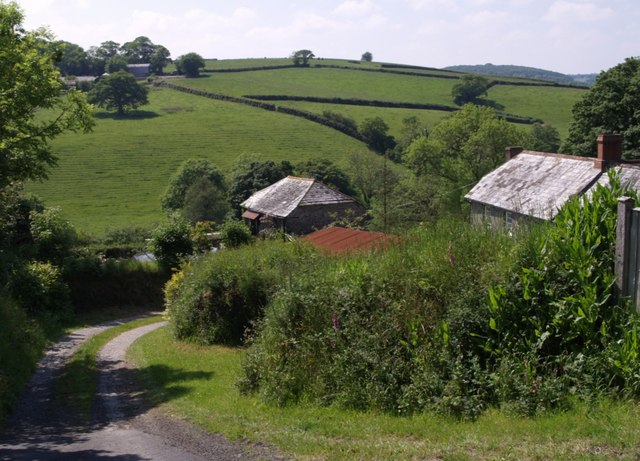
Tredivett farm, from Tregada

Tregada is a hamlet in the parish of Lawhitton, Cornwall, England, United Kingdom.
