= Trevoll =

Hamlet in Cornwall, England

Trevoll is a hamlet in the civil parish of St Newlyn East in Cornwall, England, United Kingdom. It lies in a rural area south of Newquay and consists of dispersed farmsteads and agricultural land.

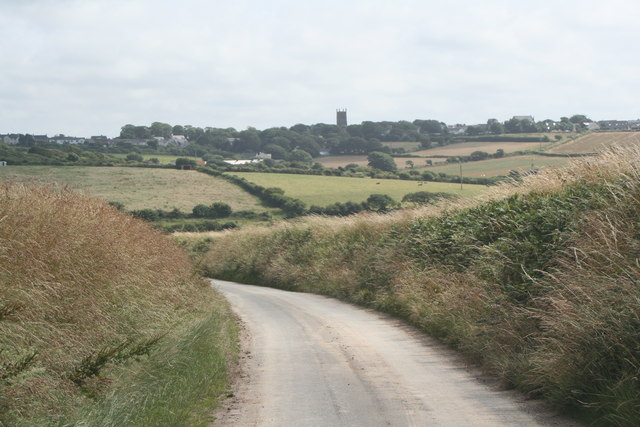
Country lane between Trevoll and St Newlyn East

The place-name Trevoll is of Cornish origin, with the prefix "Tre-" meaning "farmstead" or "settlement".

The surrounding landscape is typical of mid-Cornwall, with gently rolling farmland bounded by traditional Cornish hedges.

Trevoll forms part of the historic parish of St Newlyn East, which has medieval origins centred on the parish church. The hamlet remains sparsely populated and retains its rural character.
