= Trewithick =

Hamlet in Cornwall, England

Trewithick is a hamlet in the parish of St Stephen by Launceston Rural, Cornwall, England, United Kingdom.
