= Trefrize =

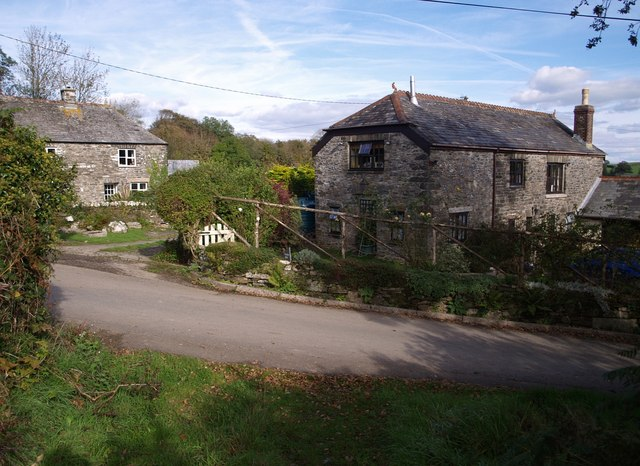
Trefrize

Trefrize is a hamlet east of Coad's Green in Cornwall, England, United Kingdom.
