= Treskinnick Cross =

Hamlet in Cornwall, England

Coordinates: 50°45′41″N 4°32′37″W

Treskinnick Cross is a hamlet at Grid ref. SX2098 on the A39 main road near Poundstock in northeast Cornwall, England, United Kingdom.
