= Trevelmond =

Hamlet in Cornwall, England

Coordinates: 50°26′42″N 4°32′00″W

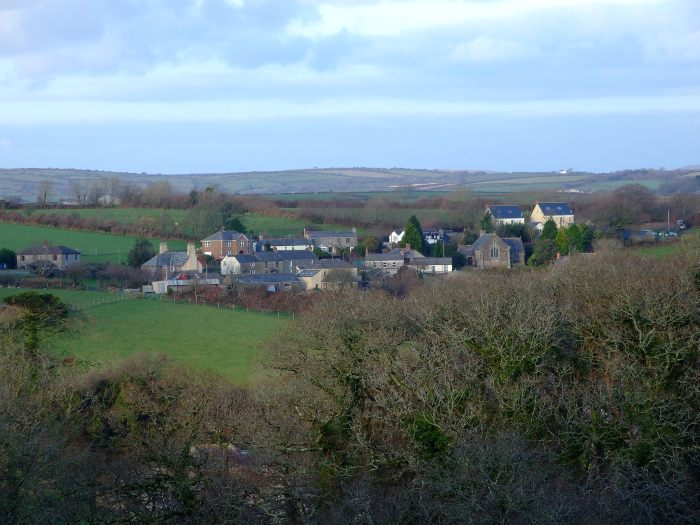
Trevelmond

Trevelmond is a hamlet in east Cornwall, England, United Kingdom. It is half a mile from St Pinnock.
