= Trevilder =

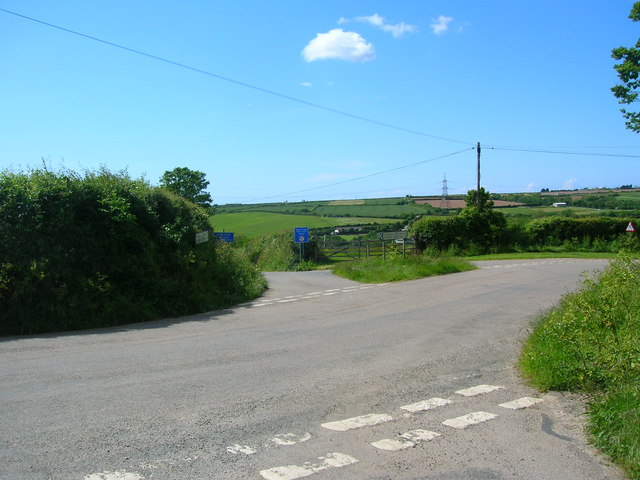
Trevilder crossroads

Trevilder is a farm in the parish of Egloshayle, Cornwall, England, UK.

== See also ==
- List of farms in Cornwall
