= Trescoll =

Trescoll is a hamlet in the parish of Luxulyan, Cornwall, England, United Kingdom.
