= Tregarlandbridge =

Tregarlandbridge is a hamlet in the parish of Duloe, Cornwall, England, United Kingdom.
