= Treviscoe =

Village in Cornwall, England

Coordinates: 50°22′09″N 4°53′38″W

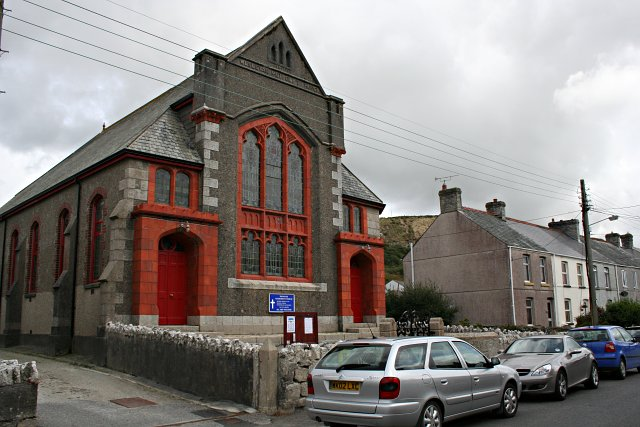
Treviscoe Methodist Church

Treviscoe (Cornish: Trevosker) is a village in St Stephen-in-Brannel civil parish, south of St Dennis in Cornwall, England, United Kingdom. There are large Imerys china clay works nearby.
