= Tregreenwell =

Hamlet in Cornwall, England

Tregreenwell is a hamlet in the parish of Michaelstow, Cornwall, England, United Kingdom.
