= Tremorebridge =

Tremorebridge is a hamlet in the parish of Withiel, Cornwall, England, United Kingdom.
