= Trelill =

Hamlet in Cornwall, England

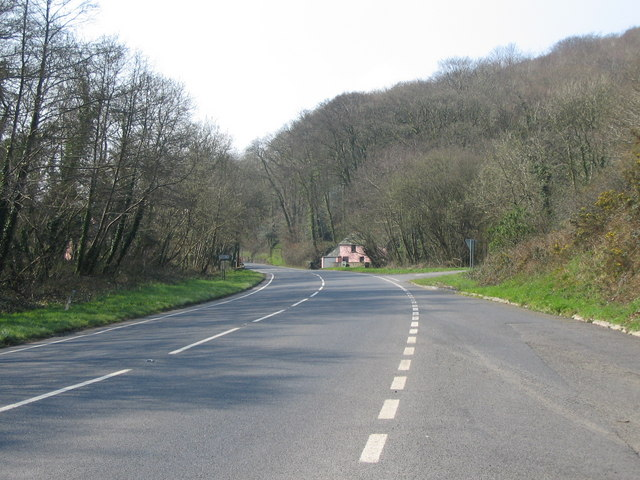
A39 main road by Trelill Wood

Trelill (Cornish: Traughlille) is a hamlet in North Cornwall, United Kingdom. Trelill Tunnel carries the disused railway line to Wadebridge and Trelill Wood is in the valley of the River Allen.

== History ==
Trelill was part of the larger St Kew parish. It was part of the estate of Plympton Priory and later the Bishop of Exeter, before the dissolution of the monasteries. For many years, the manor was held by the Molesworth family.

Cornwall was an area where Methodism had a significant impact, and by the early 19th century there were 19 Methodist members in Trelill, so that a chapel to seat 130 was built in 1812. In 1854 the chapel was in use by the United Free Methodists and a small burial ground was added in 1914. The chapel closed in 1990 and has been converted into a private dwelling although the burial ground remained in use. It is a Grade II listed building.

== Industry ==
To the west of Trelill village is the abandoned Trelill Quarry. Tetrahedrite has been found here, along with chert and tuff. Also nearby is the disused Trewethen Mine which had five shafts following a lode of lead-zinc for up to 260 fathoms (475 m). A second level of Antimony was also pursued here.

== Trelill railway tunnel ==
Trelill Tunnel is a railway tunnel on the now-closed North Cornwall Railway, which ran the Atlantic Coast Express to London, between Wadebridge and Camelford and passes directly under Trelill village. Construction of the tunnel, the only tunnel on the North Cornwall Railway commenced in 1893 and by January 1894 over 100 yards had been tunnelled into the hill. The breakthrough took place around the end of June that year and by the end of August about one third of the 333 yards (304 m) length had been opened out to the full size. The tunnel, which is built on a curve and a falling gradient towards St Kew Highway, is single-bore, but part of the agreement allowed the size to be increased to accommodate double-track although this was never required as traffic was always light. During the Second World War the tunnel was guarded by the Home Guard although the only event of any note was when a single German aircraft dropped some bombs which fell in a nearby field. The line closed on 3 October 1966 as part of Dr Beeching's railway cuts and the track removed soon after, although the tunnel was still in existence in 2020.

=== Tunnel location ===
- North portal: 50.570073°N 4.762616°W
- South portal: 50.567334°N 4.763796°W
