= Breage, Germoe and Sithney =

Former electoral division of Cornwall in the UK

- Former ward Cornwall Council
- Boundary of Breage, Germoe and Sithney in Cornwall from 2013-2021.
- County: Cornwall

2013–2021
- Number of councillors: One
- Replaced by: Porthleven, Breage and Germoe; Crowan, Sithney and Wendron
- Created from: Breage; Wendron
- Number of councillors: One

Breage, Germoe and Sithney (Cornish: Eglosbrek, Germogh ha Merthersydhni) was an electoral division of Cornwall in the United Kingdom which returned one member to sit on Cornwall Council between 2013 and 2021. It was abolished at the 2021 local elections, being succeeded by Porthleven, Breage and Germoe and Crowan, Sithney and Wendron.

== Councillors ==
Election	Member	Party
2013	John Keeling	Conservative
2017	John Keeling	Conservative
2021	Seat abolished	

== Extent ==
Breage, Germoe and Sithney represented the villages of Praa Sands, Germoe, Breage, Sithney, Prospidnick, Carleen, Godolphin Cross, Boscreege and Ashton as well as the hamlets of Newtown, Hendra, Rinsey, Rinsey Croft, Sithney Green, Crowntown, Trew, Polladras, Balwest, Great Work, Trescowe and Tresowes Green. Parts of Nancegollan, Coverack Bridges and Lowertown are also included and are shared with Crowan and Wendron division. The division covered 4,925 hectares in total.

== Election results ==
=== 2017 election ===
2017 election: Breage, Germoe and Sithney
Party	Candidate	Votes	%	±%
Conservative	John Keeling	802	47.7	
Mebyon Kernow	Michael Tresidder	347	20.6	
Green	Karen La Borde	322	19.1	
Liberal Democrats	Philippe Hadley	205	12.2	
Majority		455	27.1	
Rejected ballots		6	0.4	
Turnout		1682	47.3	
Conservative hold		Swing		

=== 2013 election ===
2013 election: Breage, Germoe and Sithney
Party	Candidate	Votes	%	±%
Conservative	John Keeling	562	52.2	
UKIP	Michael Mahon	458	42.5	
Majority		104	9.7	
Rejected ballots		57	5.3	
Turnout		1077	29.8	
Conservative win (new seat)				
