= Trewithick, Breage =

Hamlet in Cornwall, England

Coordinates: 50°05′55″N 5°20′34″W

Trewithick
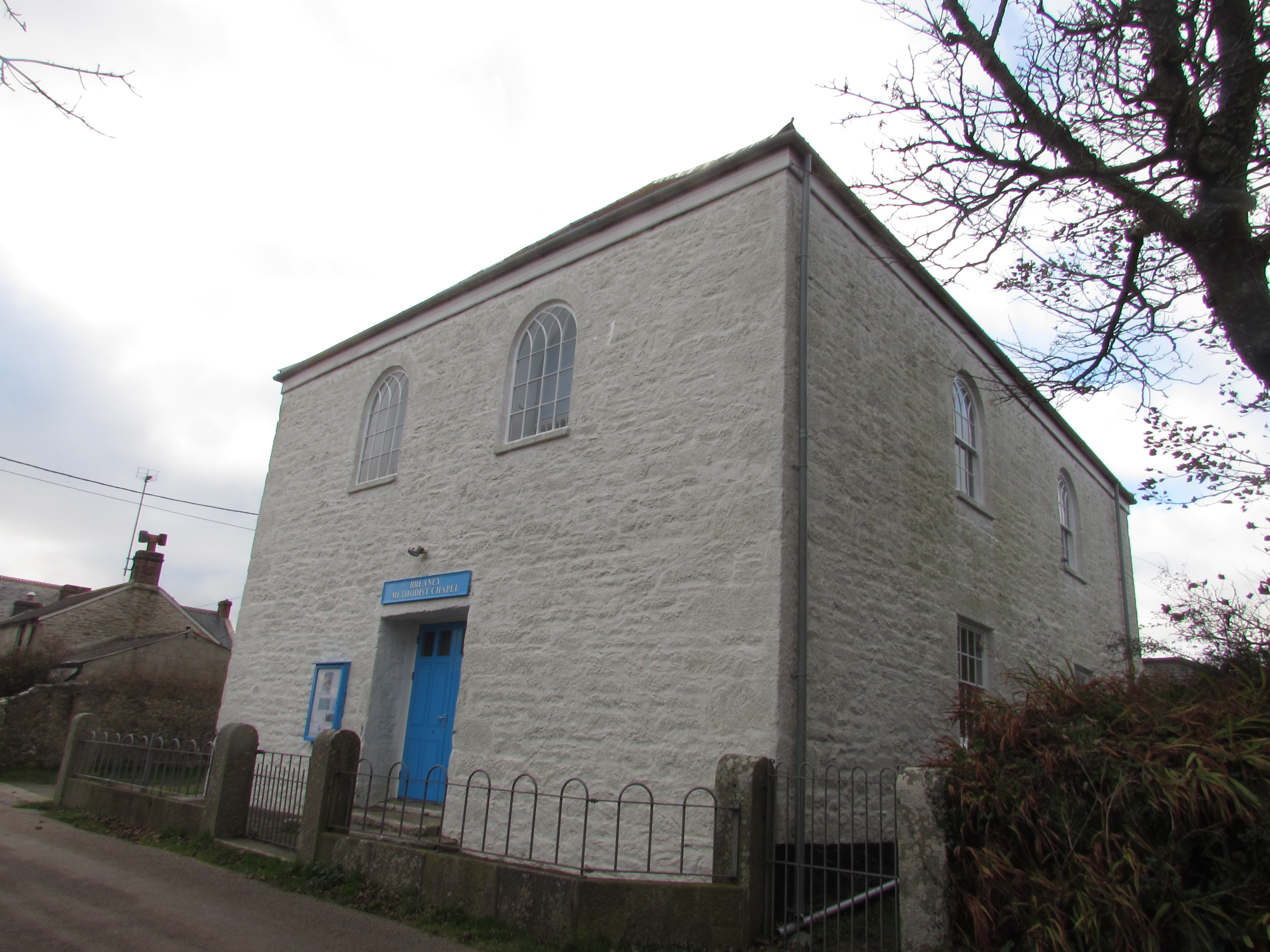
- The Methodist chapel on Trewithick Road

- Location within Cornwall
- Civil parish: Breage
- Unitary authority: Cornwall
- Ceremonial county: Cornwall
- Region: South West
- Country: England
- Sovereign state: United Kingdom
- Police: Devon and Cornwall
- Fire: Cornwall
- Ambulance: South Western

Trewithick is a hamlet in the parish of Breage in Cornwall, England. The hamlet is at the end of Trewithick Road from the A394 (formally known as School Road) and is at the junction between Porthleven and Rinsey via Breage.

The hamlet is mainly farms; however, there are also some cottages there. Breaney Methodist Chapel is about half a mile from the hamlet.
