= Godolphin Estate =

- Godhwolghan (Cornish)
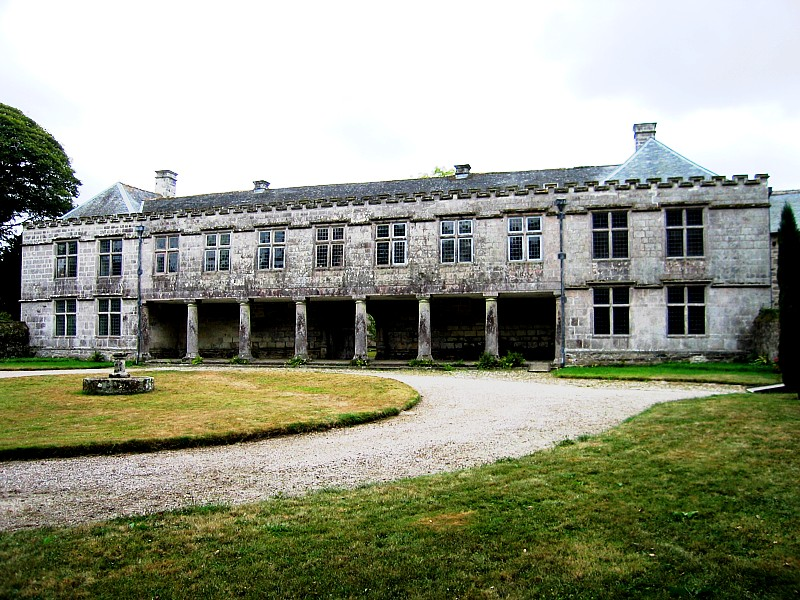
- Godolphin House

- Location within Cornwall
- 50°08′17″N 5°21′30″W
- Type: Country house
- Location: Godolphin Cross, Breage, Cornwall, England
- OS grid reference: SW 60129 31840

History
- Built: 15th–17th centuries

Site notes
- Area: Cornwall
- Owner: National Trust

Listed Building – Grade I
- Official name: Godolphin House
- Designated: 10 July 1957
- Reference no.: 1158437

National Register of Historic Parks and Gardens
- Official name: Godolphin
- Designated: 15 December 1999
- Reference no.: 1001443

Listed Building – Grade I
- Official name: Stabling and cobbled pavements adjoining Godolphin House
- Designated: 26 August 1987
- Reference no.: 1158586

Listed Building – Grade I
- Official name: Forecourt walls, stiles and mounting block at Godolphin House
- Designated: 26 August 1987
- Reference no.: 1142259

Listed Building – Grade I
- Official name: Blowing House and attached walls north-east of Blowing House Cottage on the Godolphin Estate
- Designated: 14 September 1984
- Reference no.: 1142264

The Godolphin Estate (Cornish: Godhwolghan, meaning watercourse washing-place) is a National Trust property situated in Godolphin Cross, 7 km (4.3 mi) north-west of Helston in Cornwall, England. The house is a Grade I listed building.

== History ==
The estate was the seat of the Dukes of Leeds and the Earls of Godolphin. It contains a Tudor/Stuart mansion, complete with early formal gardens, dating from c. 1500, and Elizabethan stables of around 1600. The present house is the remnant of a larger mansion. From 1786 it was owned by the Dukes of Leeds who never lived there. In 1920 George Osborne, 10th Duke of Leeds sold it to the sitting tenant Peter Quintrell Treloar. After Treloar died in 1922, the following year his wife sold it to James Penna, an agricultural engineer. Penna died in 1926 and his son James Henry lived there until his death in 1935. In that year it was bought C.B. Stevens, a local man, who sold the house and estate to artist Walter Elmer Schofield in 1937. Schofield's architect son Sydney restored the mansion, and received it as a wedding present from his parents. In 2000, his widow, Mary Schofield, sold the wider estate to the National Trust, and in 2007 the Trust bought the house, gardens and farm-yard. The Trust carried out a major conservation project of the architecture of the North Range (the historic front) to prevent it from further decay and collapse. The house is open to the public on certain days. The estate measures 550 acres (220 ha) and includes Godolphin Hill which provides views over west Cornwall. More than four hundred recorded archaeological features range from Bronze Age enclosures to 19th-century mine buildings. The Trust has been improving public access to the Estate.

The large village of Godolphin Cross (sometimes Crossroads), in the parish of Breage, adjoins the estate to the east. Amenities include a primary school.

== House and gardens ==
Godolphin House is located at grid reference SW 601 318. Various events are held throughout the year. The house is approached from the north and consists of three wings around a square courtyard and the front wall of a further building on the south side. The main buildings originally stood to the south of this with two projecting wings. One room of the 16th-century remains in the east range; this has linenfold panelling. Opposite the hall range is the Jacobean range; the north side is castellated and has a loggia of seven bays on the ground floor. Stylistic features here appear to be of the mid 17th-century and suggest that the accepted date for the house of after 1712 is very unlikely. The house is available as a holiday let for approximately three weeks each month when it is not open to the public.

=== Historic listing designations ===
Godolphin House is a listed building, recorded at the highest designation, Grade I. Three other structures on the estate, the stables, the forecourt walls, and a blowing house used for the smelting of tin are also listed at Grade I. A number of buildings on the wider estate have Grade II listings: two sets of gates and gatepiers on the drive to the house, and some garden walls; three buildings related to the tin works, a counting house, a cottage attached to the Blowing House, and a pound which may have been used for the storage of gunpowder; and a range of ancillary agricultural buildings; a cider house, a piscina and parts of a cider press, a piggery, a barn, a granary, a cart shed, and two sets of farm buildings.

The Godolphin Estate is part of the Cornwall and West Devon Mining Landscape, a UNESCO World Heritage Site.

=== Local lore ===
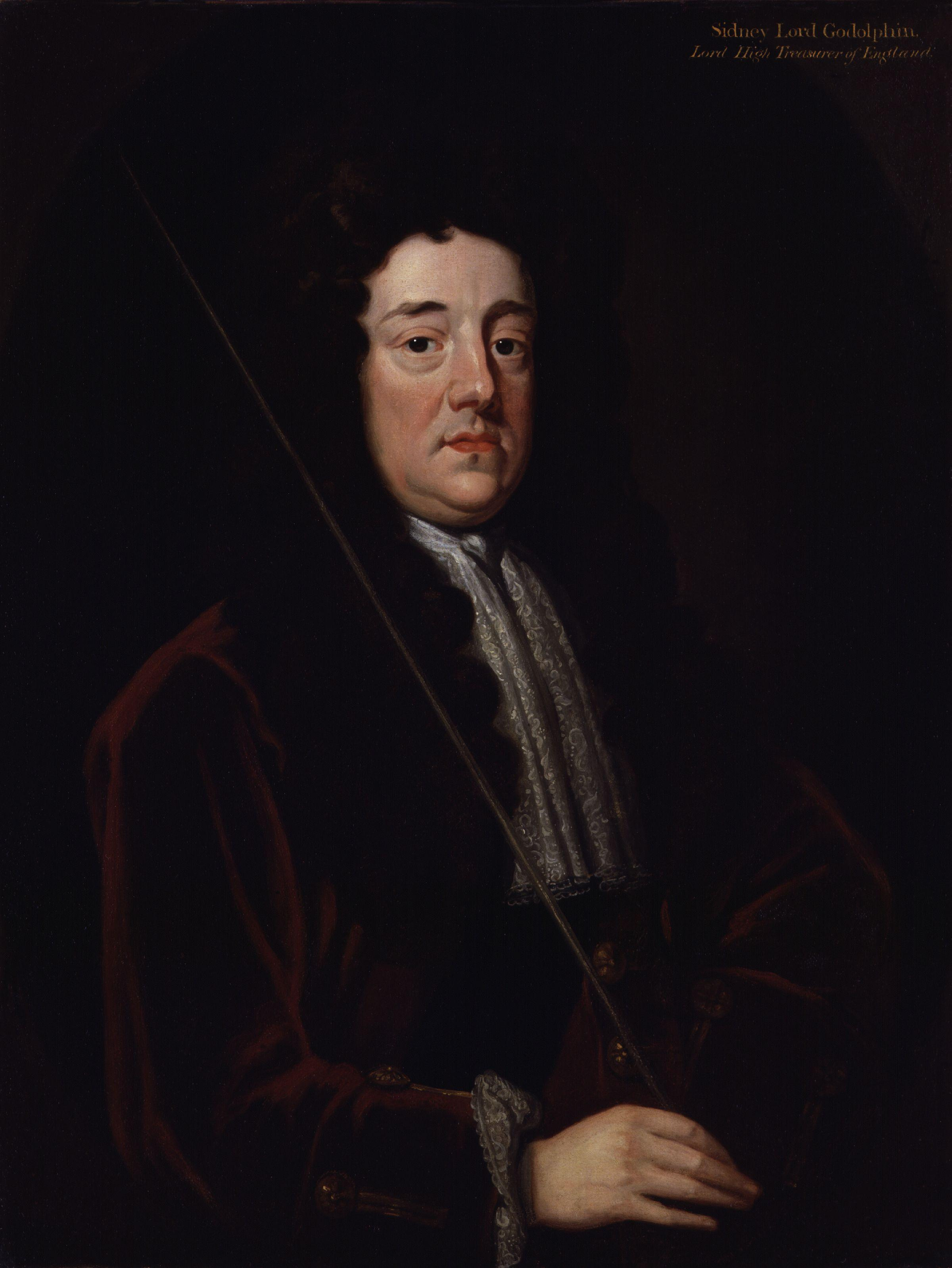
Sidney Godolphin, 1st Earl of Godolphin by Sir Godfrey Kneller

A custom first recorded in the 18th century, but which may date to the 14th, was enacted yearly on Candlemas day (2 February) until 1921. Godolphin and St Aubyn wagered their respective seats on a race between two snails; Godolphin, losing, pricked his snail which curled up and lost the race. St Aubyn instead of claiming Godolphin's estate imposed an annual custom. The reeve of Lambourne knocked on the door of the great hall of Godolphin Court and demanded to be let in. He would jump on the table and demand 'rents duties and customs'. These were paid in a large quart of strong beer, a loaf of wheaten bread and cheese of similar value and 2s 8d.
