= Walter Elmer Schofield =

American painter

W. Elmer Schofield
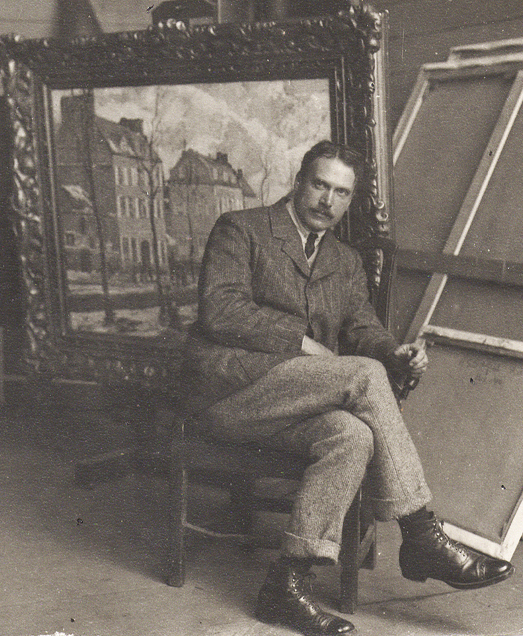
- Schofield in his studio at St. Ives, Cornwall, 1907
- Born: September 10, 1866; Philadelphia, Pennsylvania, U.S.
- Died: March 1, 1944 (aged 77); Breage, Cornwall, England
- Education: Pennsylvania Academy of the Fine Arts; Académie Julian
- Known for: Landscape art Maritime art
- Movement: Pennsylvania Impressionism

Walter Elmer Schofield ROI RBA (September 10, 1866 (Note: Although Schofield's gravestone reads "W. Elmer Schofield N.A. / 1867–1944," the artist's great-grandson and biographer, James D. W. Church, states that Schofield's passport and military records listed his birth year as 1866. Valerio, pp. 91, 121.) – March 1, 1944) was an American Impressionist landscape and marine painter. Although he never lived in New Hope or Bucks County, Schofield is regarded as one of the Pennsylvania Impressionists.

His body of work includes autumnal landscapes and snow scenes of Pennsylvania and New England, and summery landscapes and marine paintings of England and France. Late in his career, he painted vividly-colored landscapes of the American Southwest.

Schofield's works are in the collections of the National Gallery of Art, the Metropolitan Museum of Art, the Smithsonian American Art Museum, the Art Institute of Chicago, the Philadelphia Museum of Art, the Pennsylvania Academy of the Fine Arts (PAFA), the Fine Arts Museums of San Francisco, the Los Angeles County Museum of Art, the Woodmere Art Museum, and other American museums. In Europe, his works are in the collections of the Godolphin Estate in England, and the Musée d'Orsay in France. Two paintings are in the Juan Manuel Blanes Museum in Montevideo, Uruguay.

The world auction record for a Schofield work was set on December 1, 2004, when Rapids in Winter sold for US$456,000 at Sotheby's NY.

== Biography ==
W. Elmer Schofield (pronounced "SKŌ-field") was the youngest of the eight children of Philadelphia businessman Benjamin Schofield (1820–1900) and Mary Wollstonecraft Schofield (1822–1899). His parents emigrated from England to Philadelphia in 1845, and his father and uncles built textile mills in Manayunk, along the Schuylkill River. He grew up in the Germantown section of Philadelphia, and graduated from Central High School in 1886. He attended Swarthmore College for a year, before dropping out and working as a cowboy in San Antonio, Texas. He studied at the Pennsylvania Academy of the Fine Arts, 1889–92, under Thomas Anshutz and Robert Vonnoh. He moved to Paris in 1892, and studied at the Académie Julian under William Bouguereau, Gabriel Ferrier, and Henri Lucien Doucet.

Schofield returned to Philadelphia at the end of 1894. Robert Henri, a friend and fellow PAFA alumnus, was then teaching at the Philadelphia School of Design for Women. Schofield was among a group of Philadelphia artists – William Glackens, Edward Willis Redfield, John French Sloan, Everett Shinn, George Luks, James Moore Preston, Edward Davis, Charles Grafly, Stirling Calder, Hugh Breckenridge – who would meet at Henri's studio on Tuesday nights to discuss art and aesthetics. (Note: "Henri played host to regular artists' gatherings at his studio, occasions to socialize, drink, sketch, talk about art, and give artistic criticism of one another's work. Henri urged the young men he brought together to read Whitman and Emerson, William Morris Hunt's Talks on Art and George Moore's Modern Painting, and to think about the need to create a vigorous new American art that spoke to their time and experience. These gatherings were the inspirational beginning of what became known as the Ashcan school of American art.") Schofield, Henri, Glackens, Grafly and artist Augustus Koopman sailed for France together in June 1895. (Note: Schofield, Henri and Koopman had trained in Paris, this was Glackens's first visit. They came to study the French Impressionists, to paint, and to each develop his own style. Grafy was on his honeymoon, and had taken a sabbatical from teaching at PAFA to work on a major anti-war sculpture, that became The Vultures of War. Schofield painted in Paris, Brittany and Fontainebleau.) Schofield, Henri and Glackens were fascinated by the subtle atmospheric effects of Dutch Old Master painters, and the trio made a bicycle tour through Belgium and the Netherlands, visiting churches and museums along the way. (Note: "We had a good voyage, Glack, Schofield and I, after seeing the [Paris] Salons, for about ten days went on a bike trip to Brussels, Antwerp, Rotterdam, Amsterdam, Harlem & Hague. Great trip, beautiful scenery. Passed through the Champagne district of France. Such wine! So cheap and so much of it! Ooh, la! la!" — Robert Henri to John Sloan, July 1895.) Schofield was also influenced by Les Nabis, "a group of French painters whose work emphasized bright colors, flattened forms and decorative patterning."

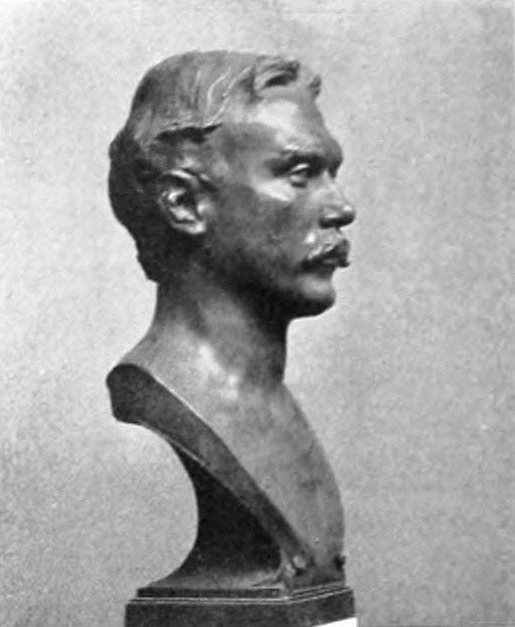
Bust of W. Elmer Schofield (1905), by Charles Grafly, National Academy of Design

Schofield returned to Philadelphia in Fall 1895, and worked in his father's textile business for a short time. He met Muriel Redmayne, an English visitor to the city. They married on October 7, 1896 in Ormskirk, Lancashire (near Liverpool). The newlyweds returned to Philadelphia, and lived with his parents in Cheltenham Township, just north of the city. They bought a house in the Oak Lane section of Philadelphia. Schofield had early professional success with restrained Pennsylvania winter landscapes, (Note: "January Evening and Winter, snow studies in the woods, deserve particular attention; for they are by a young painter, W. Elmer Schofield, a pupil of the Pennsylvania Academy, who has recently returned from supplementing his studies in France. They recall no one else's treatment of snow subjects. Nature has evidently been his inspiration; he has studied her sincerely, with much feeling for her color and spaciousness, and expressed what he has found in a vigorous and simple way, without any attempt to display what he could have done with it had he been so minded. In this way, he has secured both individuality and sentiment.") painted in a Tonalist style "characterized by muted colors and soft, flowing brushwork". In 1899, he and his pregnant wife moved to Southport, North West England, and lived with her parents. The couple had two sons, Seymour and Sydney. The family lived for a time in Brittany, and from 1903 to 1907 in the coastal town of St. Ives, Cornwall. Schofield would spend half of the year in Philadelphia, painting his signature autumn and winter scenes, while his wife and sons remained in England. He maintained this routine from 1902 to 1937, except during World War I.

After his parents' deaths, Schofield would stay with his brother Albert (Note: Albert was president of the Delph Spinning Company, which made cotton yarn for knitting hosiery and underwear. Schofield, Albert and their unmarried sister Alice each inherited a one-third interest in the company from their father. Valerio, p. 39.) and family in the Chestnut Hill neighborhood of the city. This was a short walk from the Valley Green section of Fairmount Park, and the picturesque Wissahickon Creek became the subject of a number of his paintings.

Zero weather, rain, falling snow, wind—all these things to contend with only make the open-air painter love the fight. — W. Elmer Schofield

Schofield had roomed with Edward Redfield in France, and the two enjoyed a friendly rivalry. Both worked en plein air even in the coldest weather, both favored large canvases and preferred to finish a work in a single day, and the pair sometimes painted together. (Note: "I went to see Redfield, spent two nights there and did a lot of camping. It really does one good to get a chance to see other men's work and mentally take notes." — Schofield to his wife Mary, February 1902.) Observing Redfield, Schofield gradually abandoned his Tonalist technique in favor of a more dynamic style "of expressionistic brushwork and a greater sense of form, structure and patterning that itself border[ed] on Post-Impressionism."

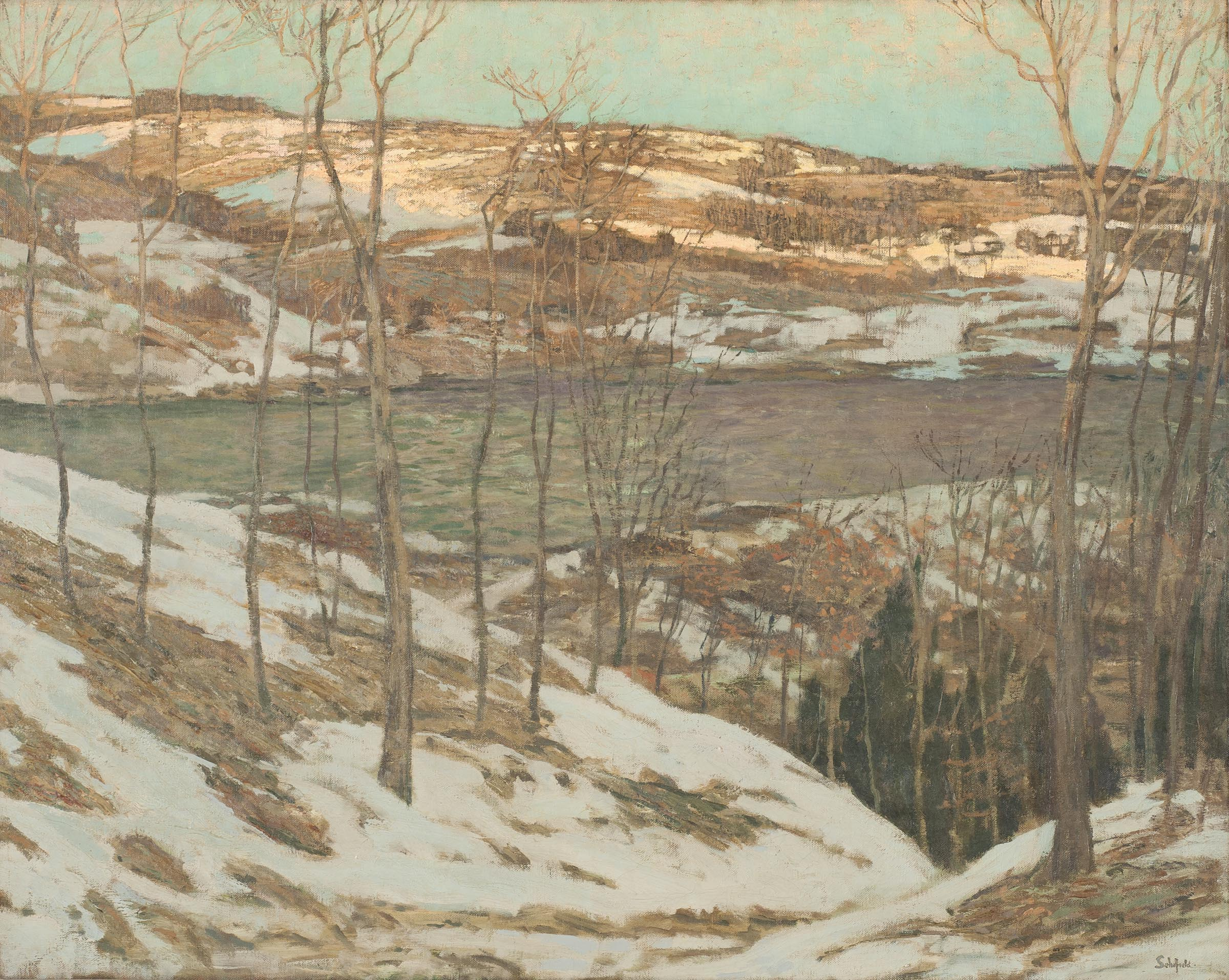
Across the River (1904) Carnegie Museum of Art. Winner of the 1904 Carnegie Prize.

Redfield and Schofield had a major falling out in 1904, that developed into a lifelong feud. (Note: The Carnegie Museum of Art awarded Schofield its 1904 gold medal for Across the River. Redfield served on the Carnegie's art jury that year, but was outvoted by the other jurors. In a 1963 interview, Redfield, age 93, claimed that the painting depicted a site that he had shown to Schofield, who then returned to England and reproduced the scene from memory. Art historian Thomas Folk discovered the likely reason for the intensity of Redfield's anger toward Schofield: Across the River depicts the Delaware River from the front yard of Redfield's own house.) Art historian Thomas Folk suspects that Schofield never painted in New Hope again. (Note: Folk owns a recording of Redfield's 1963 interview. In it Redfield recounted confronting Schofield: "You, keep out of my front yard after this." "You paint your own subjects.") Painter Emile Gruppe witnessed the results of Schofield's transformation in the first decade of the 20th century: "I can still remember the great National Academy shows. Three painters dominated the walls: Edward Redfield, Daniel Garber and Elmer Schofield. They all worked boldly and with wonderful color – and you never critically compared them, for you loved each one when you stood in front of his canvas."

Schofield painted in a brighter palette after World War I, applying this new approach to snow scenes, to coastal scenes of Cornwall, and to landscapes of California, New Mexico and Arizona.

Schofield especially liked to paint on sunny days. Even in canvases where sunlight isn't a tangible presence, it often might as well be, because the brightness of the colors and the clean delineations between objects give the illusion of light even when it's not really there. As one of Schofield's contemporaries put it, "He is an open-air man, wholesome, healthy, and his art, sane and straightforward, reflects his temperament." Schofield took great joy in what he saw. His trees, for example, are sinuous, sensuous, dancing entities, full of rhythm and life. He could transform an ordinary English village into an organized yet delightful casual conglomeration of lines, angles, planes, and shapes. He saw nature in bright colors—light greens, pale blues, intense whites dappled with gray shadows—and he never lost his sense of wonder at the beauty of the natural world. As he put it, "Nature is always vital, even in her implicit moods, and never denies a vision to the real lover."

World War II ended Schofield's annual trips to the United States. He spent his last years living and painting in Cornwall.

=== Personal ===
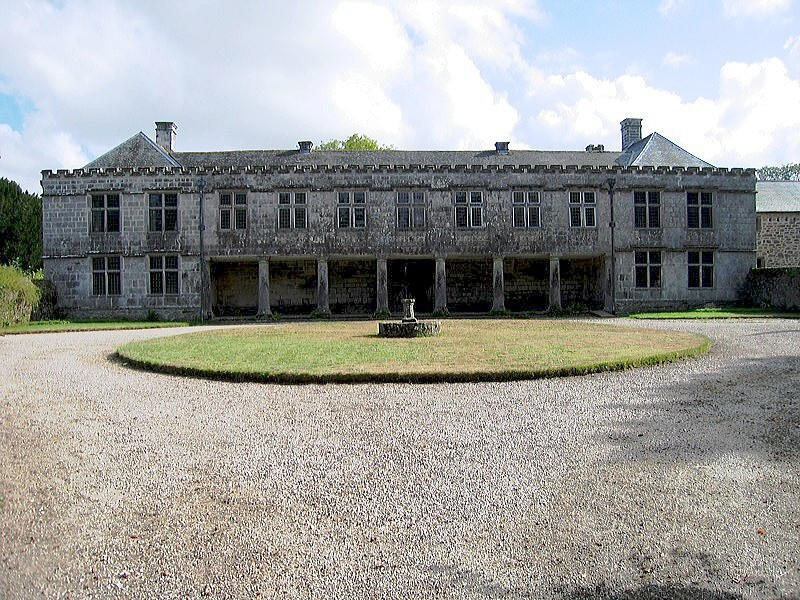
"Godolphin House." Schofield and his family owned the property from 1937 to 2007.

Schofield was close friends with Pennsylvania Impressionist painter Walter Emerson Baum, who named one of his sons Elmer Schofield Baum.

In July 1915, at age 48, Schofield enlisted as a private in the British Army during World War I. (Note: "At my time of life one does not as a rule take up the soldier's profession but it was not my love of it that forced me on—but the strong desire to do what I could to prevent Germany goose-stepping over the world and help force her out of France." — Schofield to Robert Henri, 18 November 1915, quoted in Folk 1983, p. 22.) Three months later, he accepted a commission as 2nd lieutenant in the Cornwall Garrison of the Royal Artillery. He rose to the rank of captain, and was discharged with the rank of major. (Note: "The 'Welcome Home' Exhibition of W. Elmer Schofield at the Macbeth Gallery was the first in New York for nearly ten years. His war activities as a captain in the British Army naturally interrupted his art output, but evidently sent him back to his easel with a vigor which fully equals anything he did in the old American days. His work seems rather to have been enriched by his absence from his palette, to have fulfilled itself. Mr. Schofield is a vigorous painter with a feeling for wide spaces and the genial, handsome face of nature. It is good to have him back again.")

After the war, Schofield and his wife lived in Perranporth, Cornwall for several years, and in Otley, Suffolk from 1925 to 1937. In September 1937, they purchased "Godolphin House," a 17th-century manor in Breage, Cornwall, which was restored by their architect son, Sydney Elmer Schofield (1901–1983). Many of Schofield's late paintings depict the manor and its gardens. The couple moved to the smaller "Gwedna House" on the same property in 1941, and gave the manor house to Sydney and his bride.

Walter Elmer Schofield died of a heart attack at "Gwedna House" on March 1, 1944. His body was temporarily buried in England, and after World War II was exhumed and reburied in Philadelphia, at the Church of St. James the Less. His wife Muriel, who survived him by 16 years, was buried beside him. Sydney designed their gravestone. In addition to being an architect, Sydney was a portrait painter. Sydney's widow sold "Godolphin House" to the National Trust in 2007.

=== Exhibitions, awards and honors ===
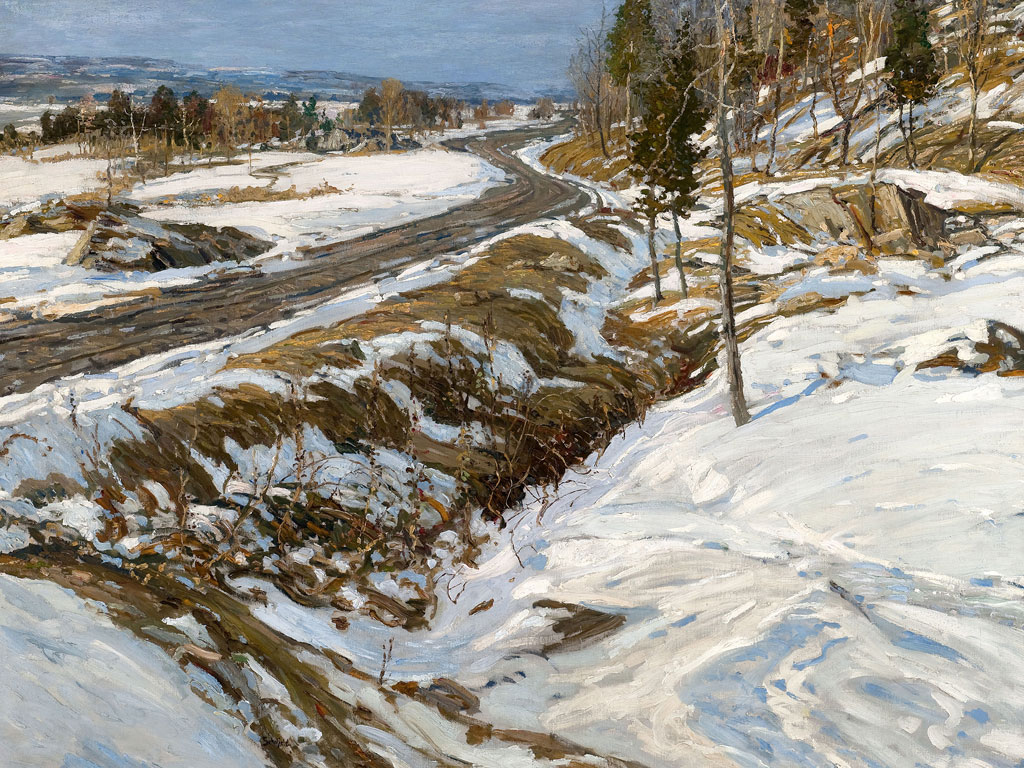
The Hill Country (c.1913), Woodmere Art Museum, Philadelphia. Winner of PAFA's 1914 Temple Gold Medal

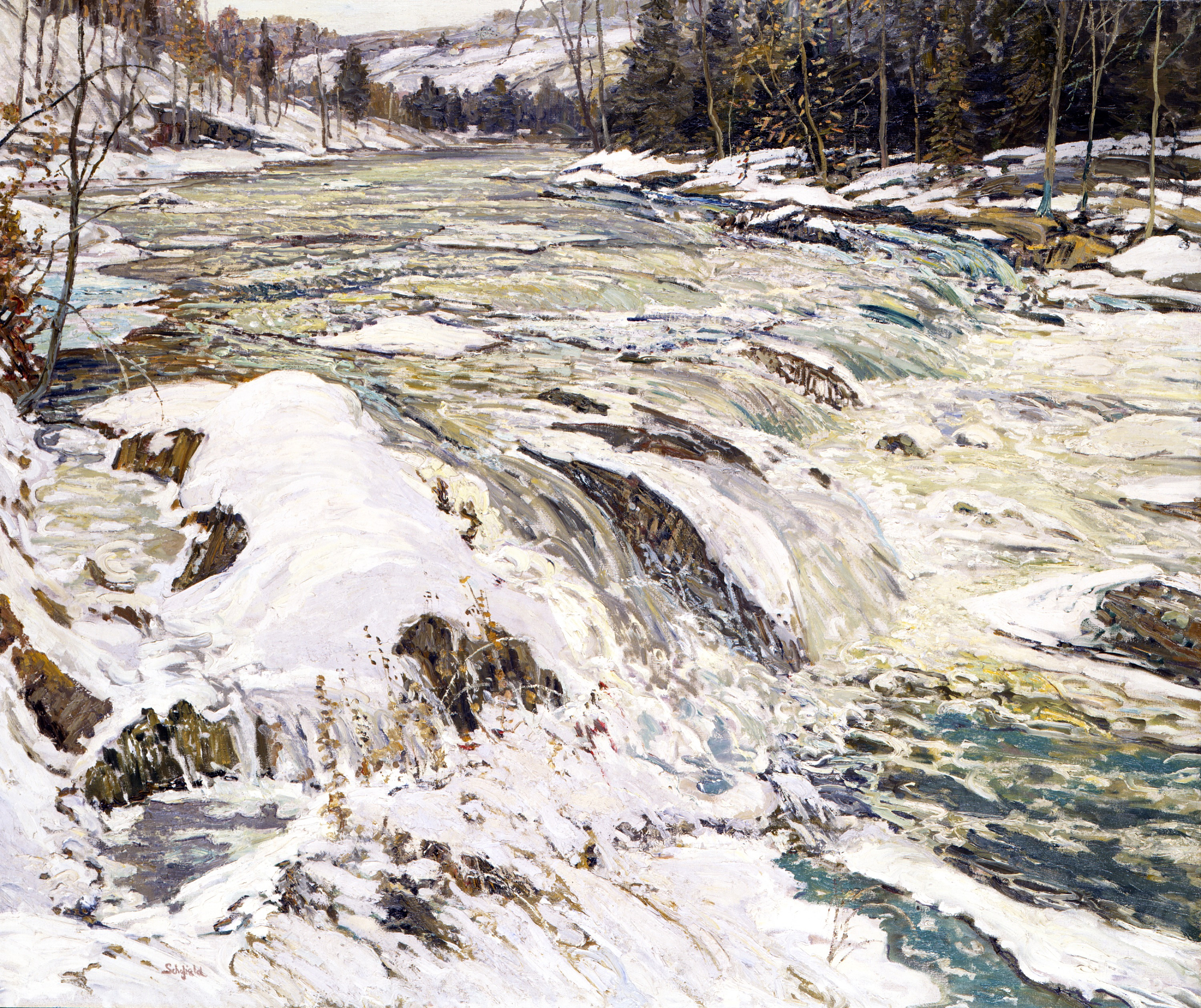
The Rapids (c.1914), Smithsonian American Art Museum. Winner of the National Academy of Design's 1920 Altman Prize

Schofield exhibited at a number of international expositions: the 1900 Exposition Universelle in Paris (honorable mention for January Evening); the 1901 Pan-American Exposition in Buffalo, New York (silver medal for Autumn in Brittany); the 1904 World's Fair in St. Louis, Missouri (silver medal for Winter Morning); the 1910 Exposición Internacional del Centenario in Buenos Aires, Argentina (gold medal for The First Days of Spring); the 1915 Panama-Pacific Exposition in San Francisco (silver medal for The Hilltop); and the 1926 Sesquicentennial Exposition in Philadelphia (silver medal for The Little Harbor).

Schofield exhibited at the Pennsylvania Academy of the Fine Arts most years from 1891 to 1937, and posthumously in 1946. PAFA awarded him its 1903 Jennie Sesnan Gold Medal (best landscape painting exhibited by an American artist) for Breezy Day, Early Autumn; and its 1914 Temple Gold Medal (best oil painting exhibited by an American artist) for The Hill Country. He exhibited regularly at the National Academy of Design in New York City. NAD awarded him its 1901 First Hallgarten Prize for Winter Evening; its 1911 Inness Gold Medal for February Morning; and its 1920 Altman Prize for The Rapids. The Society of American Artists awarded him its 1900 Webb Prize of $300 (best landscape exhibited by an American artist under 40) for Autumn in Brittany. The Carnegie Institute in Pittsburgh awarded him its 1900 honorable mention (4th prize) for January Woods; and its 1904 gold medal and $1,500 prize for Across the River. He was one of several American artists invited to exhibit at the 1906 (New) Paris Salon. The St. Louis Art Museum hosted a one-man show of his paintings in 1912. The National Arts Club in New York City awarded him its 1913 gold medal and $1,000 prize for The Spring Thaw. The Memorial Art Gallery in Rochester, New York hosted a one-man-show of his paintings in February and March 1915. Schofield visited the exhibition, and painted two works during his stay, both of which are now in the gallery's collection. The Art Institute of Chicago hosted a one-man-show of his paintings in 1920, and awarded him its 1921 Spalding $1,000 Prize for Morning Light. The Corcoran Art Gallery in Washington, D.C. hosted 3 one-man-shows of Schofield's paintings – in 1912, 1920 and 1932 – and awarded him its 1926 silver medal and $1,500 Clark Prize for Cliff Shadows. Schofield also exhibited at the Royal Academy of Arts in London.

Schofield was elected an Associate of the National Academy of Design in 1902 – Robert Henri painted his diploma portrait – and an Academician in 1907. He was elected a member of the Society of American Artists in 1904, and elected to the National Institute of Arts and Letters in 1908. He was a Fellow of the Pennsylvania Academy of the Fine Arts, and a member of the Art Club of Philadelphia. In New York City, he was a member of the Century Association and the Salmagundi Club, and a life member of the National Art Club. (Note: Schofield often lodged at the National Art Club when in New York City.) He was elected an honorary member of the Royal Society of British Artists in 1907, and elected to the Royal Institute of Oil Painters in 1910. He was a member of the Chelsea Arts Club in London, and the St Ives Society of Artists in Cornwall.

==== Posthumous exhibitions ====
The National Academy of Design mounted a memorial exhibition of his work in 1945, as did the Woodmere Art Museum that same year. The Brandywine River Museum mounted a 1983 retrospective exhibition: Walter Elmer Schofield, Bold Impressionist. The Payne Gallery at Moravian College mounted a 1988 retrospective exhibition: W. Elmer Schofield: Proud Painter of Modest Lands. The Woodmere Art Museum mounted a 2014 retrospective exhibition – Schofield, International Impressionist – that focused on his career on both sides of the Atlantic; and a small 2017 exhibition of recent gifts from the artist's descendants. The Trout Gallery at Dickinson College mounted a 2015 exhibition, Schofield: Impressionist Landscapes.

== Selected works ==
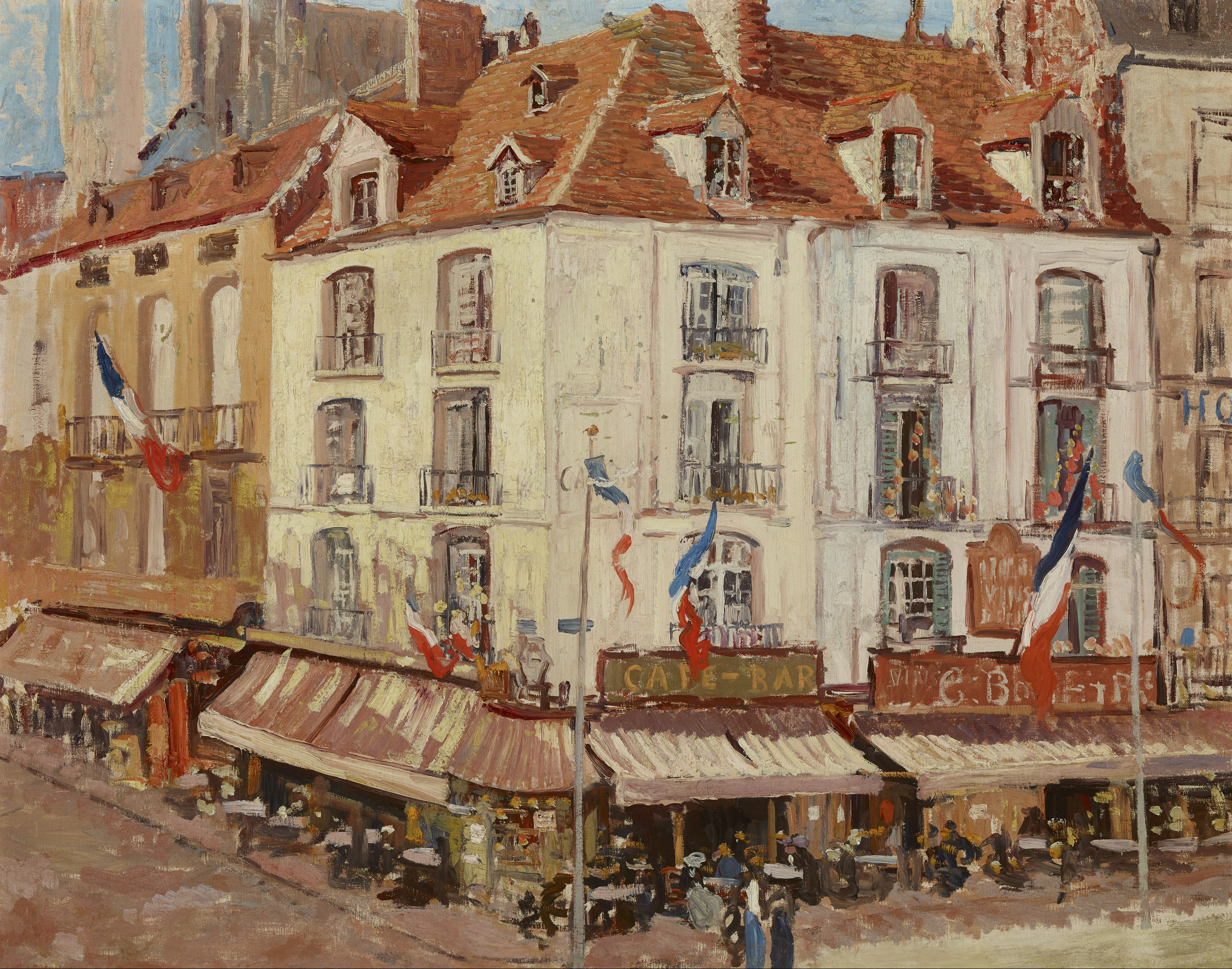
Montmartre (c.1896), Woodmere Art Museum, Philadelphia. Painted under the influence of Les Nabis.

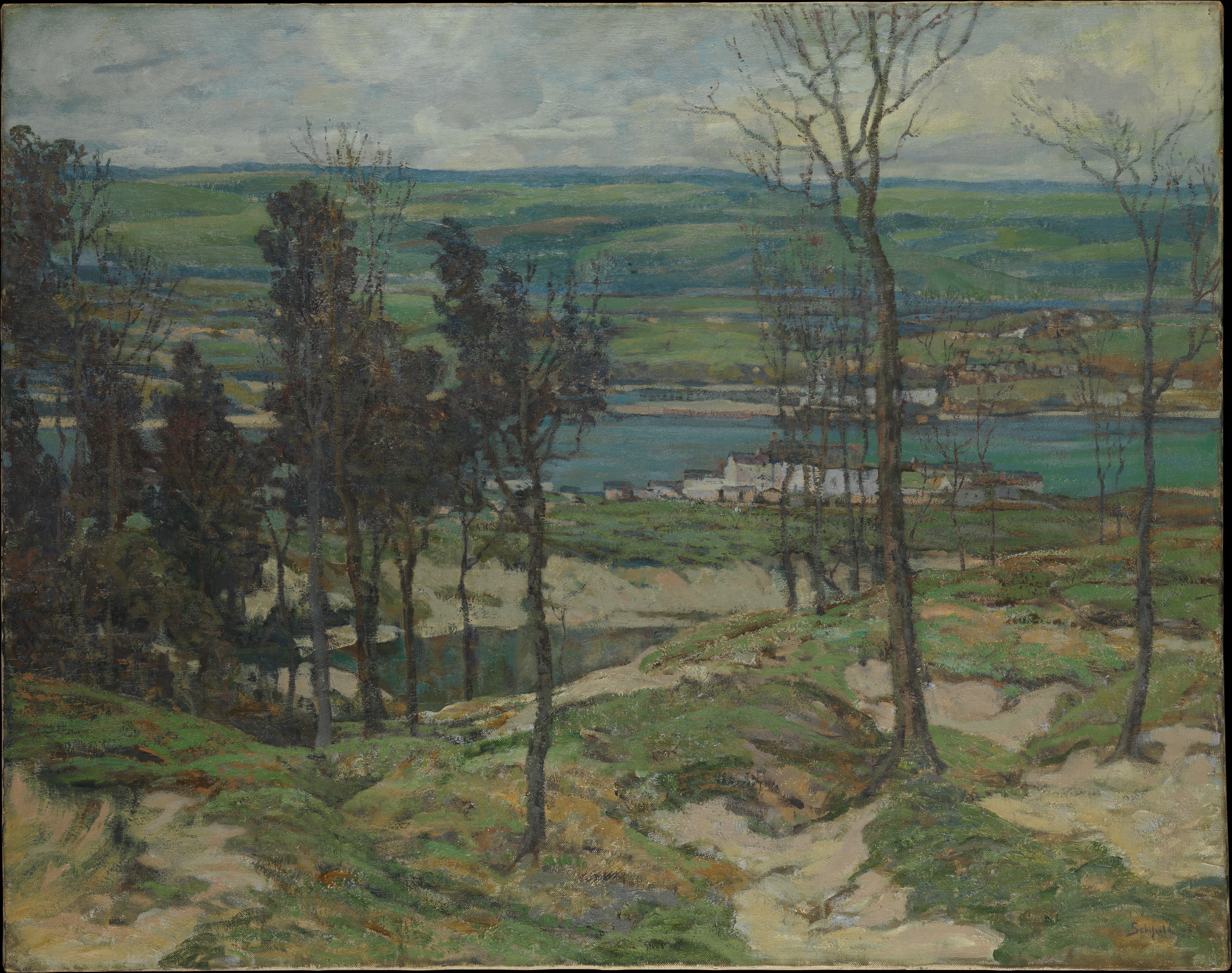
Sand Dunes near Lelant, Cornwall (1905), Metropolitan Museum of Art

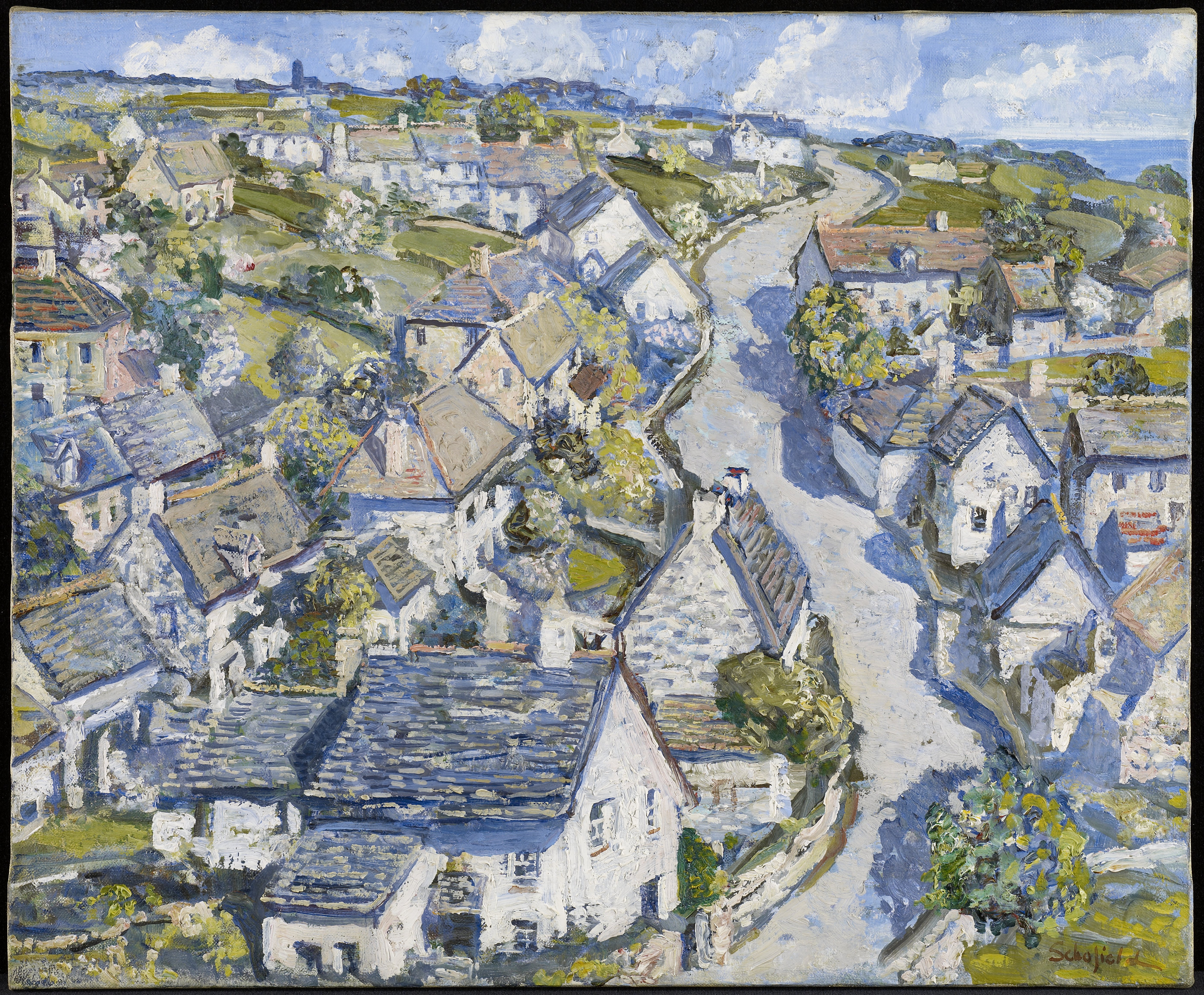
Mining Village in Cornwall (c.1920), Minneapolis Institute of Arts

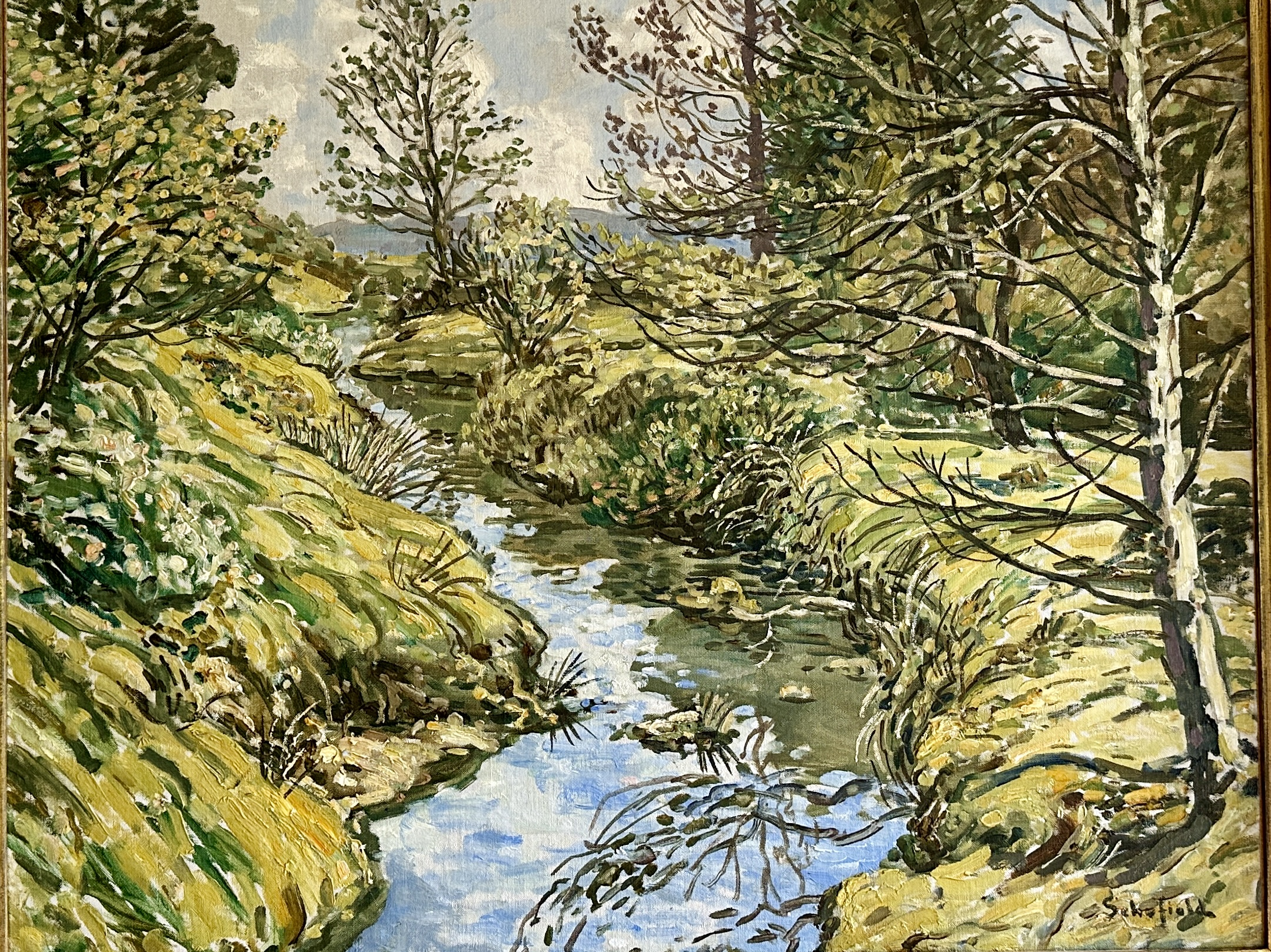
"Summer Morning" (1935), 26 x 30 inches

- Montmartre (c.1896), Woodmere Art Museum, Philadelphia.
- Winter (1899), Pennsylvania Academy of the Fine Arts, Philadelphia.
- Winter Evening (1899), Philip and Muriel Berman Museum of Art, Ursinus College, Collegeville, Pennsylvania. Awarded NAD's 1901 First Hallgarten Prize.
- Autumn in Brittany (c.1900), Albright-Knox Art Gallery, Buffalo, New York. Awarded the Society of American Artists' 1900 Webb Prize, and a silver medal at the 1901 Pan-American Exposition.
- Breezy Day, Early Autumn (c.1902), Reading Public Museum, Reading, Pennsylvania. Awarded PAFA's 1903 Sesnan Gold Medal.
- Morning After Snow (1903), Corcoran Gallery of Art, Washington, D.C.
- Across the River (c.1904), Carnegie Art Museum, Pittsburgh, Pennsylvania Awarded the Carnegie Institute's 1904 gold medal.
- Sand Dunes near Lelant, Cornwall (1905), Metropolitan Museum of Art
- Winter in Picardy (1907), Philadelphia Museum of Art
- Evening along the Shore, St. Ives (c.1907), National Academy of Design, New York City
- Old Mills on the Somme (c.1907), Indianapolis Museum of Art
- The Lock (1908). Ex collection: St. Louis Art Museum
- On the Canal, Bruges (1908), private collection
- The Landing Stage, Boulogne (1908–09), Cincinnati Art Museum
- Winter Landscape (1909), private collection. Sold at Shannon's Fine Art Auctioneers, Milford, CT, October 25, 2018, Lot 45. Realized $75,000 plus buyer's premium.
- The First Days of Spring (c.1910), Juan Manuel Blanes Museum, Montevideo, Uruguay. Awarded a gold medal at the 1910 Exposición Internacional del Centenario in Buenos Aires.
- Ebb Tide (c.1912), National Arts Club, New York City
- Covered Bridge on the Schuylkill (The Red Bridge) (c.1912), Brandywine River Museum, Chadds Ford, Pennsylvania
- Frosty Morning (1913), Avery Galleries, Bryn Mawr, Pennsylvania. Ex collection: Montclair Art Museum (Note: Frosty Morning was deaccessioned by the Montclair Art Museum in 2009, and auctioned at Christie's NY, 20 May 2009. It sold for $30,000 plus buyer's premium.)
- The Hill Country (c.1913), Woodmere Art Museum, Philadelphia. Awarded PAFA's 1914 Temple Gold Medal.
- The Spring Thaw (c.1913), Biggs Museum of American Art, Dover, Delaware. Awarded the National Arts Club's 1913 gold medal.
- The Powerhouse, Falls Village, Connecticut (c.1914), Art Institute of Chicago
- Building The Coffer-dam (c.1914), Art Institute of Chicago
- The Rapids (c.1914), Smithsonian American Art Museum. Awarded NAD's 1920 Altman Prize. On loan to Brooklyn Museum, 1920-1954 (Note: The Brooklyn Museum hosted the National Academy of Design's 1920 Spring Exhibition. NAD purchased The Rapids at the exhibition, and placed the painting on long-term loan to the museum as a token of thanks. It was transferred to the Smithsonian Institution in 1954.)
  - The Falls in Winter (sketch for The Rapids) (c.1914), Payne Gallery, Moravian College, Bethlehem, Pennsylvania.
- The Old Covered Bridge (c.1914), Rockford Art Museum, Rockford, Illinois
- The Lower Falls (1915), Memorial Art Gallery, University of Rochester, Rochester, New York
- In the Dugway (1915), Memorial Art Gallery, University of Rochester, Rochester, New York
- Mining Village in Cornwall (c.1920), Minneapolis Institute of Arts
- Morning Light (Lumiere du Matin) (c.1921), Musée d'Orsay, Paris, France Awarded the Art Institute of Chicago's 1921 Spalding Prize.
- Cliff Shadows (1921), National Gallery of Art, Washington, D.C. Awarded the Corcoran Art Gallery's 1926 silver medal and Clark Prize.
- The Birches (The Ravine) (1922), Fine Arts Museums of San Francisco
- Sunlit Cove (1923), High Museum of Art, Atlanta, Georgia
- The Little Harbor (c.1925), private collection. Awarded a silver medal at the 1926 Sesquicentennial Exposition.
- The Red Barn (1930), Payne Gallery, Moravian College, Bethlehem, Pennsylvania
- Cornish Coast (c.1934), James A. Michener Art Museum, Doylestown, Pennsylvania
- Tujunga Canyon (c.1934-35), Los Angeles County Museum of Art
- Summer Morning (1935) Sold at Rago Auction, November 12, 2021, Lot 446. Realized $40,000 + buyer's premium.
- Rapids in Winter (c.1936), private collection. Sold at Sotheby's NY, December 1, 2004, realized $456,000 (auction record).
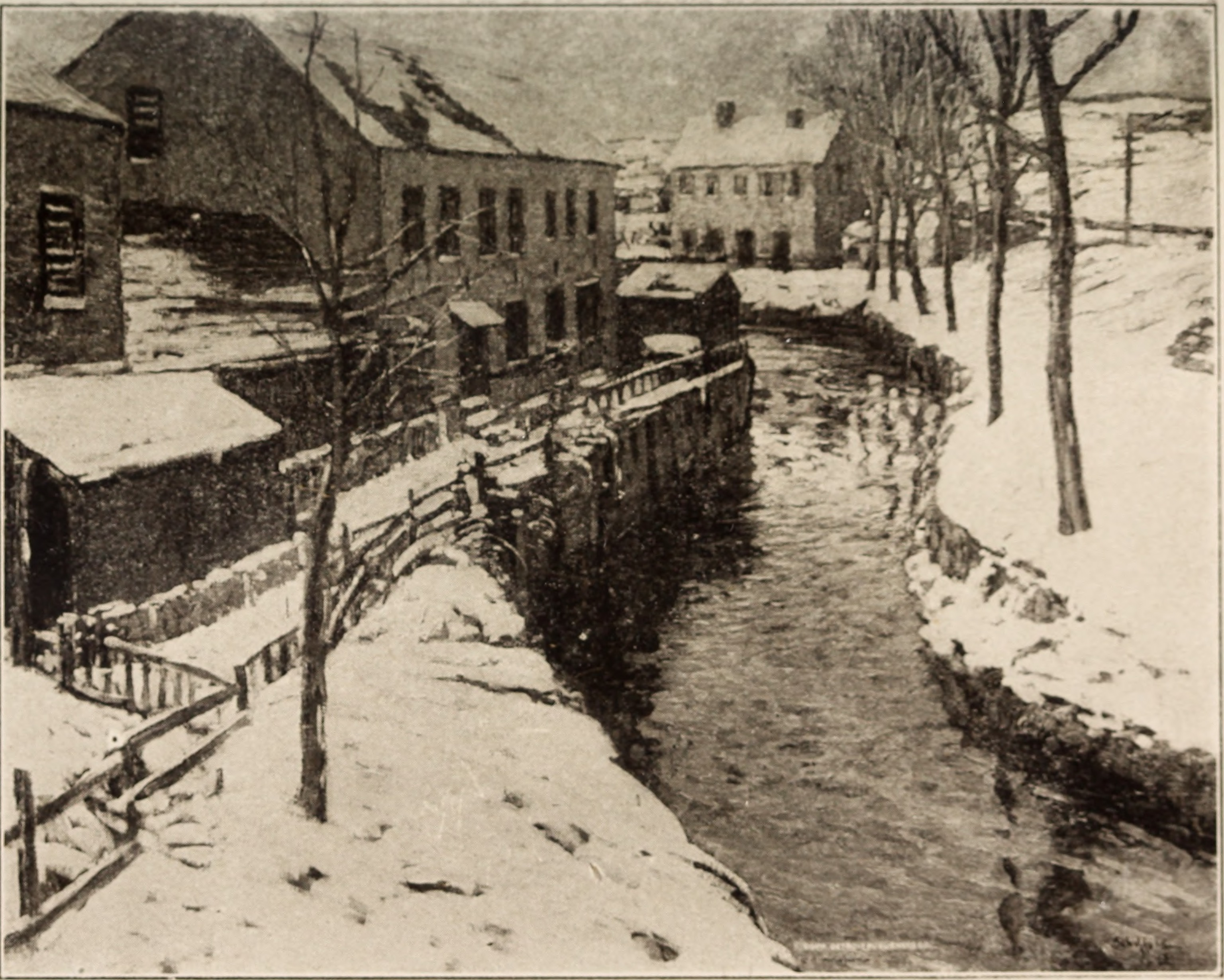
Morning After Snow (1903), Corcoran Gallery of Art

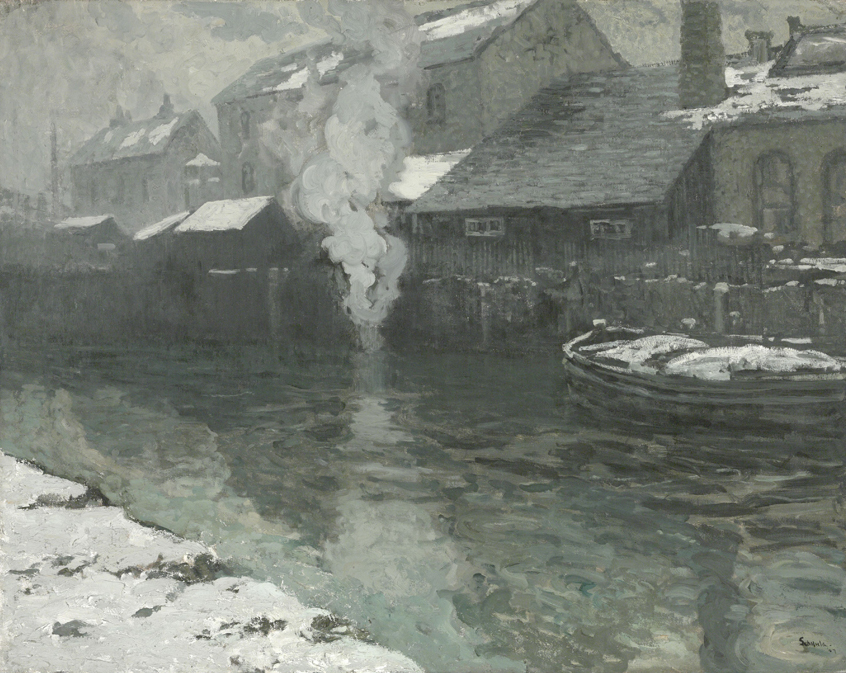
Winter in Picardy (1907), Philadelphia Museum of Art

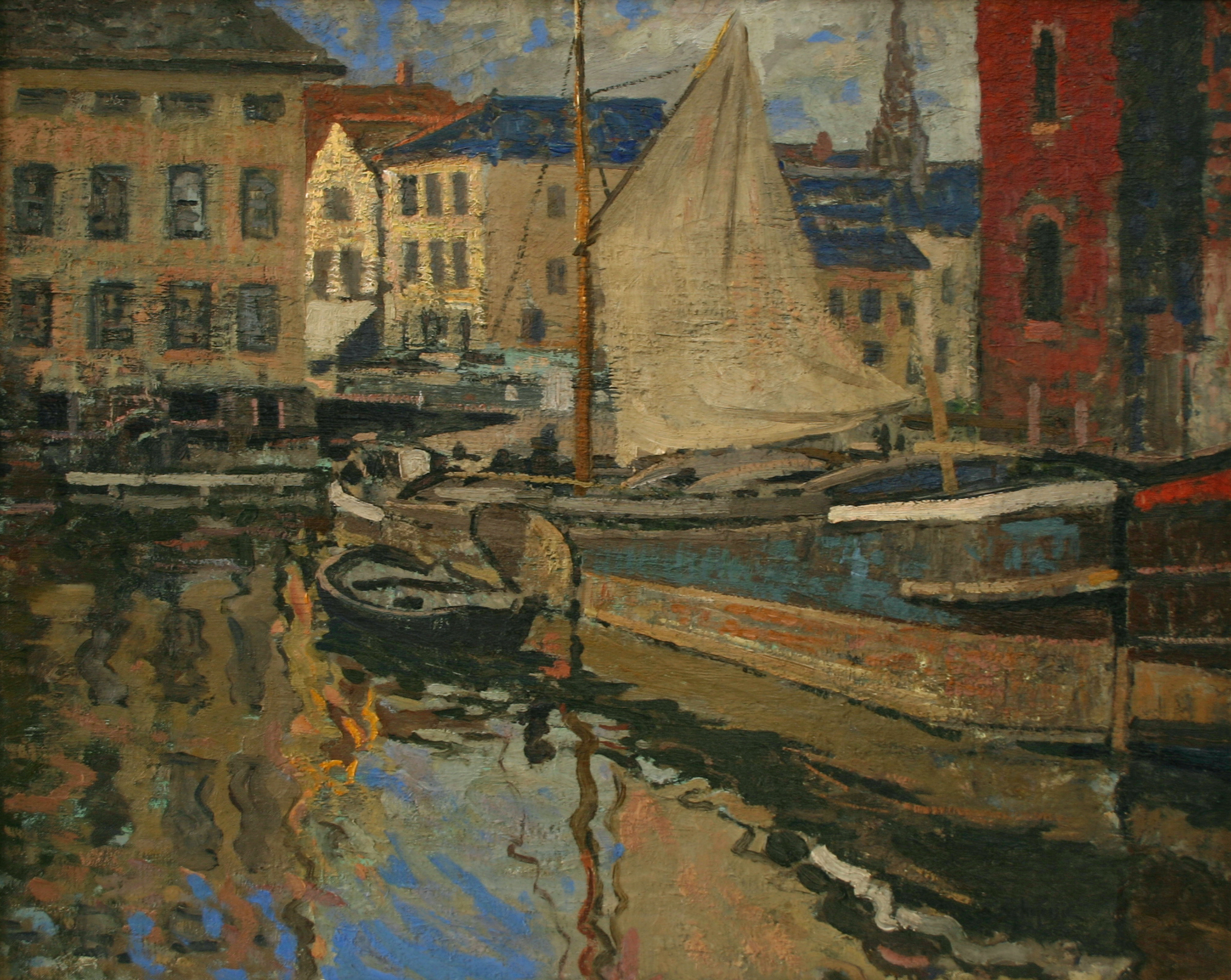
On the Canal, Bruges (1908), private collection

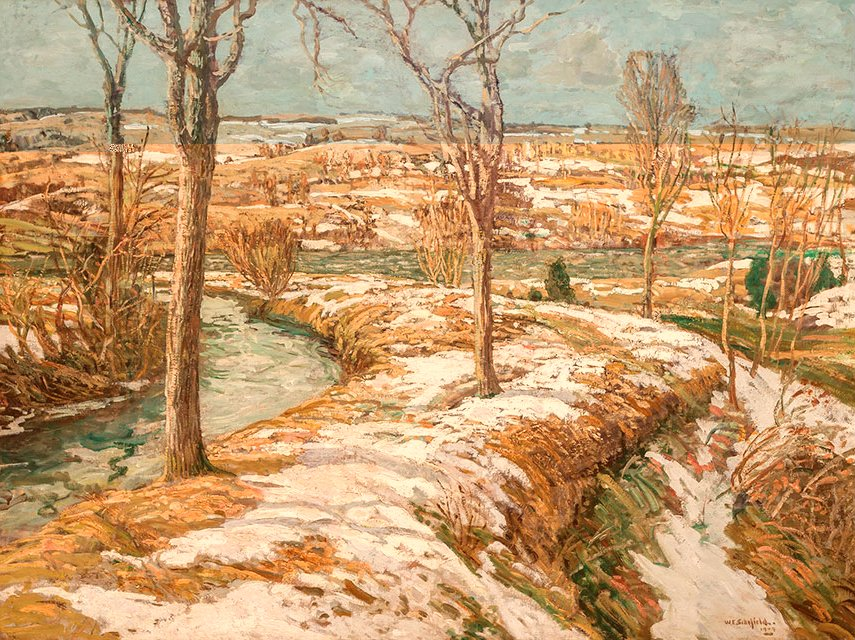
Winter Landscape (1909), private collection

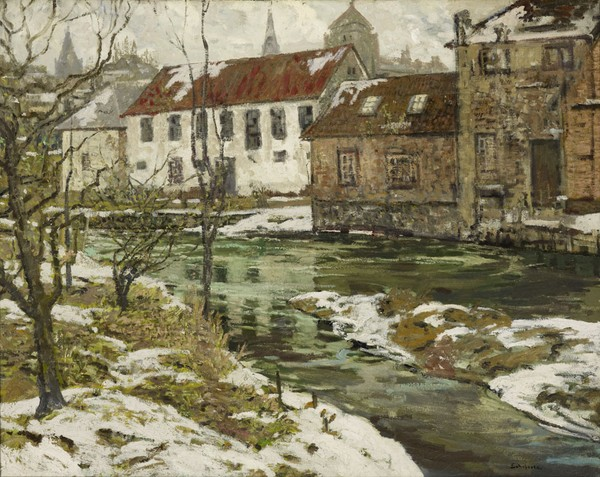
Old Mills on the Somme (c.1909), Indianapolis Museum of Art

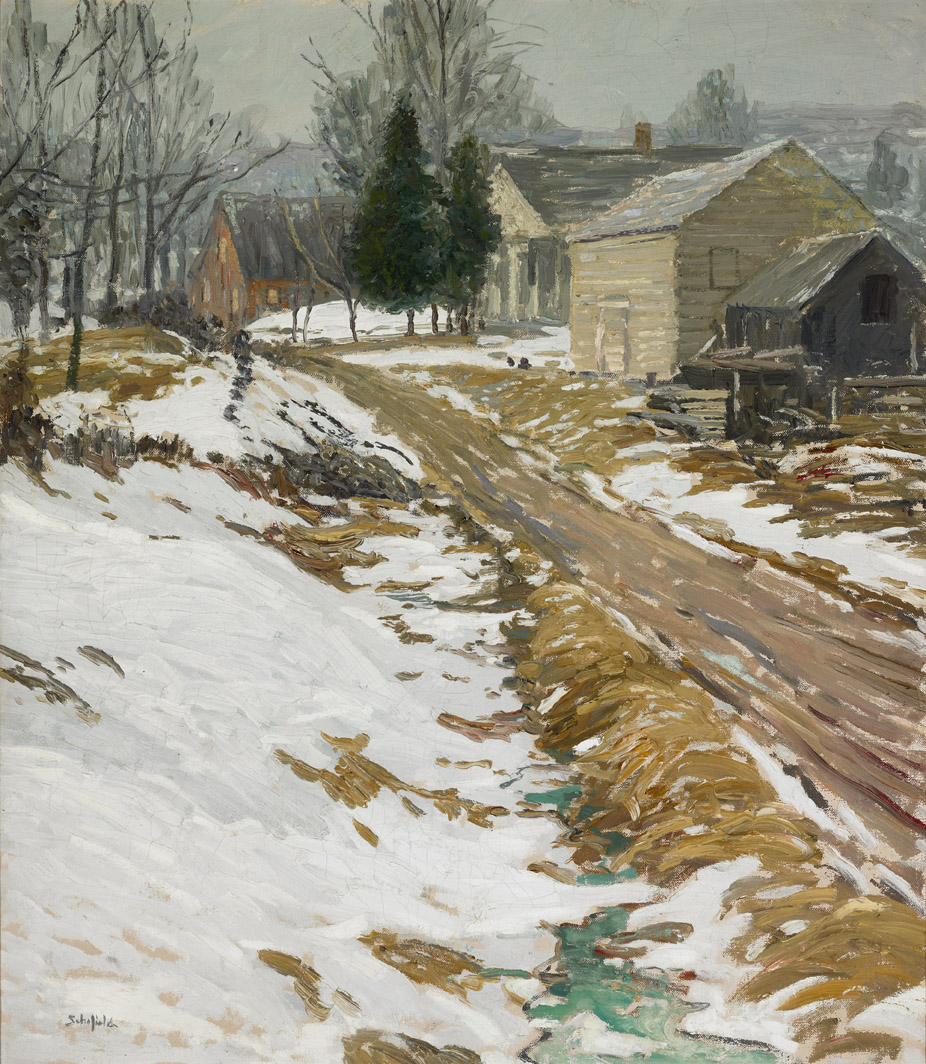
Frosty Morning (1913), Ex collection: Montclair Art Museum

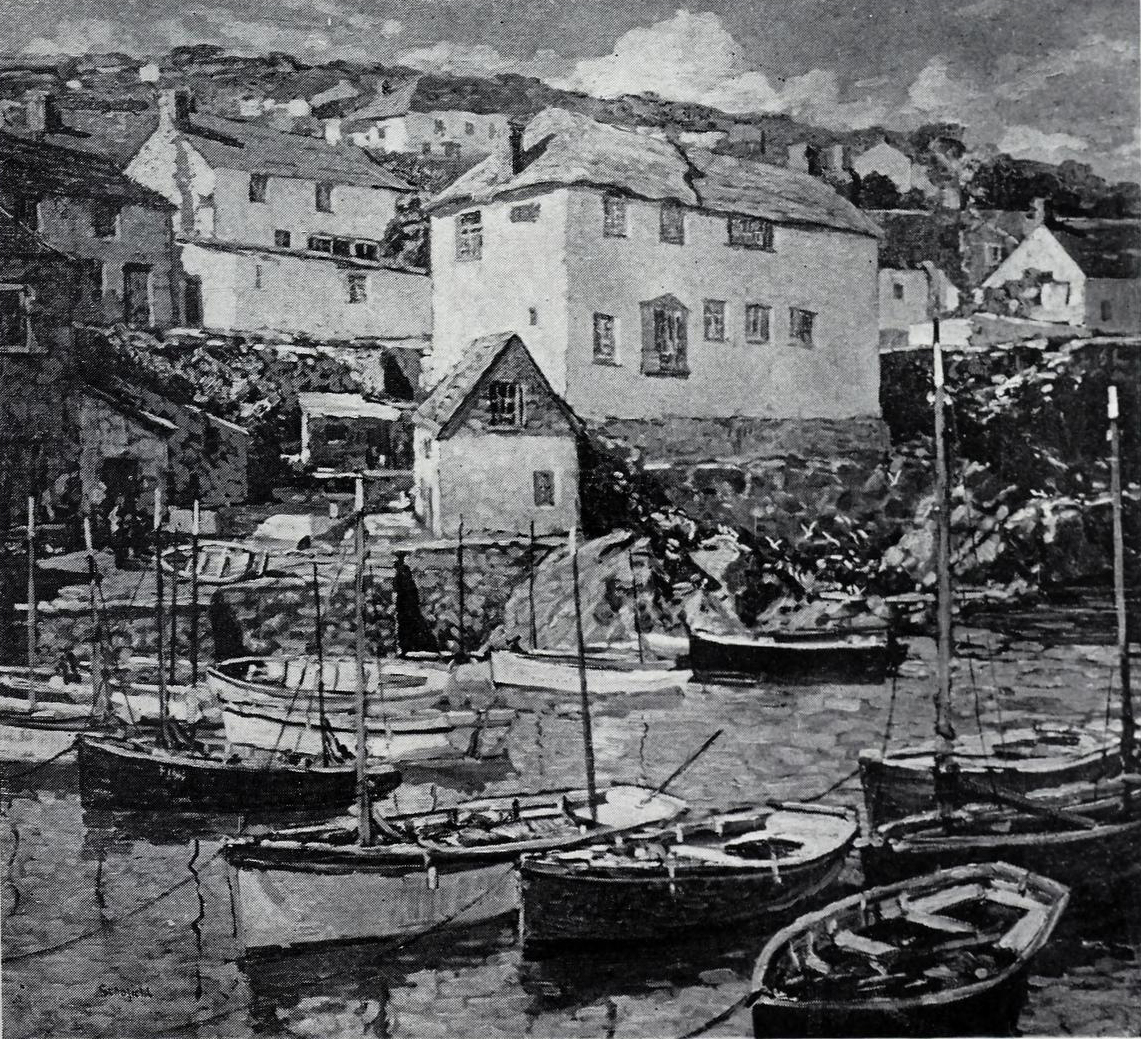
The Little Harbor (c.1925), private collection. Silver medal at the 1926 Sesqui-centennial Exposition

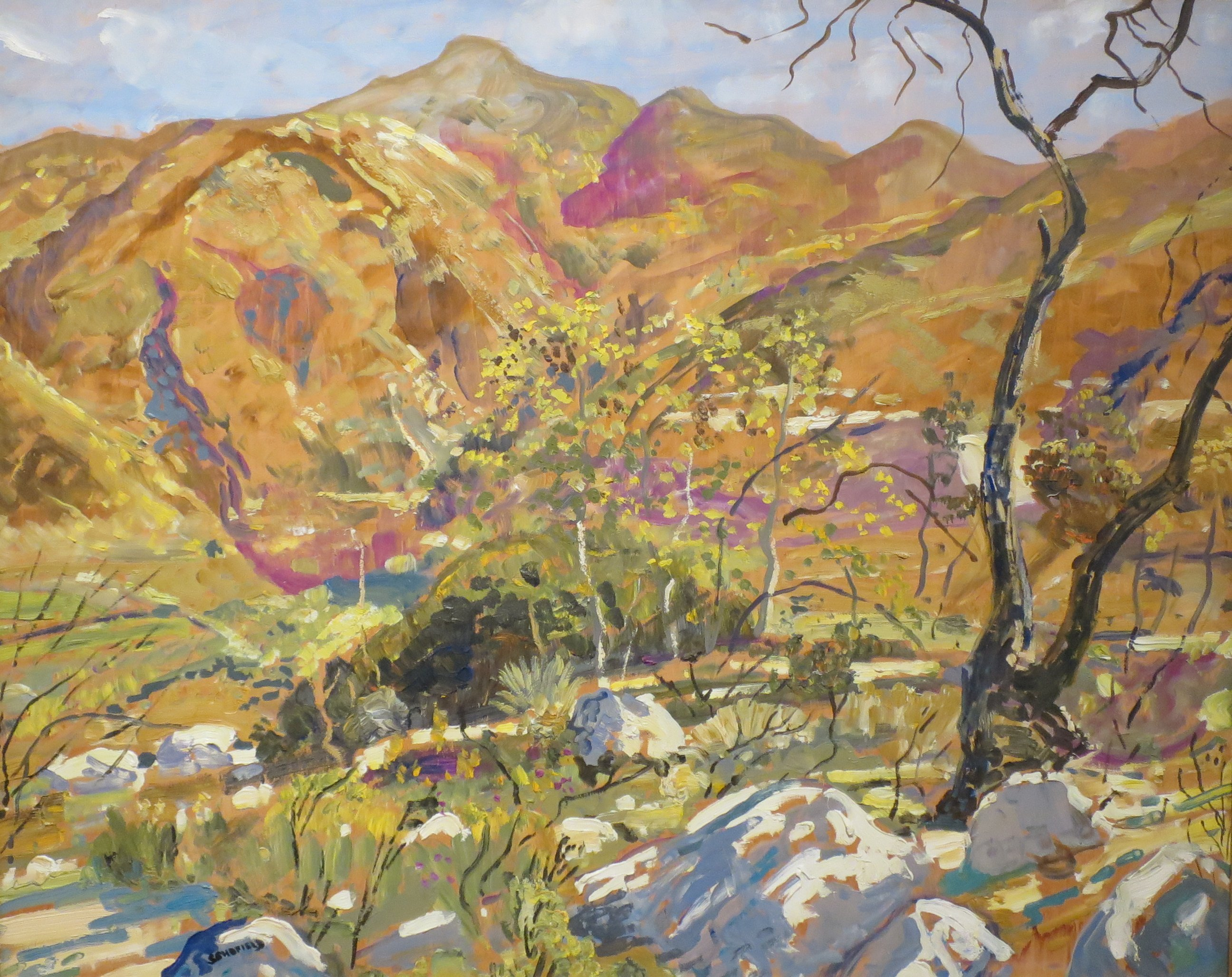
Tujunga Canyon (c.1934-35), Los Angeles County Museum of Art
