= Penhale Jakes =

Hamlet in Cornwall, England

Coordinates: 50.107°N 5.347°W

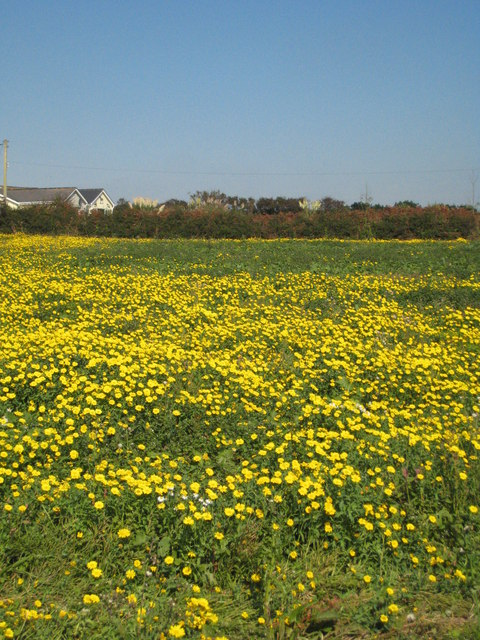
- A field of corn marigolds near Penhale Jakes Farm

- Location within Cornwall
- Civil parish: Breage
- Unitary authority: Cornwall
- Ceremonial county: Cornwall
- Region: South West
- Country: England
- Sovereign state: United Kingdom
- Police: Devon and Cornwall
- Fire: Cornwall
- Ambulance: South Western

Penhale Jakes is a hamlet west of Breage, in the civil parish of Breage, in west Cornwall, England, UK.
