= Polladras =

Village in Cornwall, England

Coordinates: 50.123°N 5.335°W

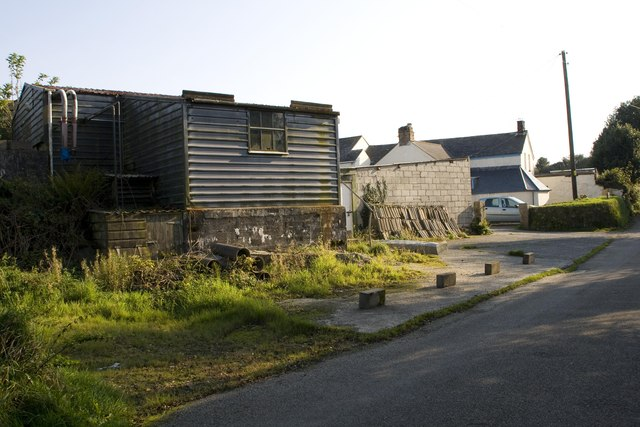
- Polladras Farm

- Location within Cornwall
- Civil parish: Breage
- Unitary authority: Cornwall
- Ceremonial county: Cornwall
- Region: South West
- Country: England
- Sovereign state: United Kingdom
- Police: Devon and Cornwall
- Fire: Cornwall
- Ambulance: South Western

Polladras is a hamlet in the civil parish of Breage, in west Cornwall, England, United Kingdom. It is situated one mile south of Godolphin Cross and three miles (5 km) northwest of Helston; it is northeast of Tregonning Hill.

Polladras is a group of settlements along two rural roads, inhabited by families and retired people. It includes a campsite at Lower Polladras and a care home.
