= Broadlane =

Hamlet in Cornwall, England

Coordinates: 50.12986°N 5.34377°W

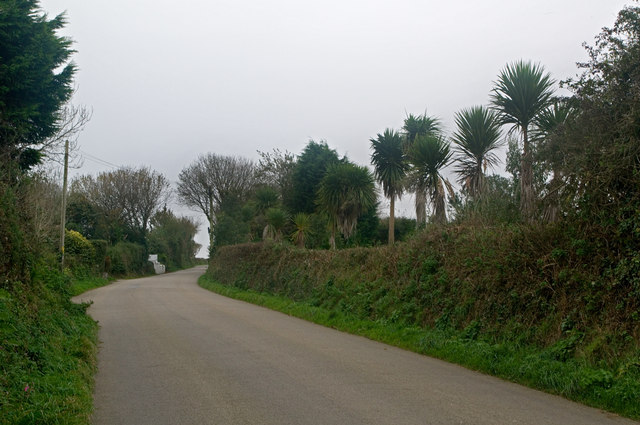
- Road past Polrose Farm

- Location within Cornwall
- Civil parish: Breage
- Unitary authority: Cornwall
- Ceremonial county: Cornwall
- Region: South West
- Country: England
- Sovereign state: United Kingdom
- Police: Devon and Cornwall
- Fire: Cornwall
- Ambulance: South Western

Broadlane is a hamlet in the parish of Breage, Cornwall, England.
