= Great Wheal Fortune =

Disused mine in west Cornwall, England

- Site of Special Scientific Interest
- Location in southwest Cornwall
- Location of Great Wheal Fortune.
- Area of search: Cornwall
- Grid reference: SW627290
- Coordinates: 50.1140°N 5.3198°W
- Interest: Geological
- Area: 0.55 hectares (0.006 km^{2}; 0.002 sq mi)
- Notification date: 1991

Wheal Fortune or Great Wheal Fortune is the site of a mine in the civil parishes of Breage and Sithney in west Cornwall. Part of the disused mine was designated as a Site of Special Scientific Interest (SSSI) for its geological interest in 1991 and is also a Geological Conservation Review site of national importance for the minerals on the site.

== History ==
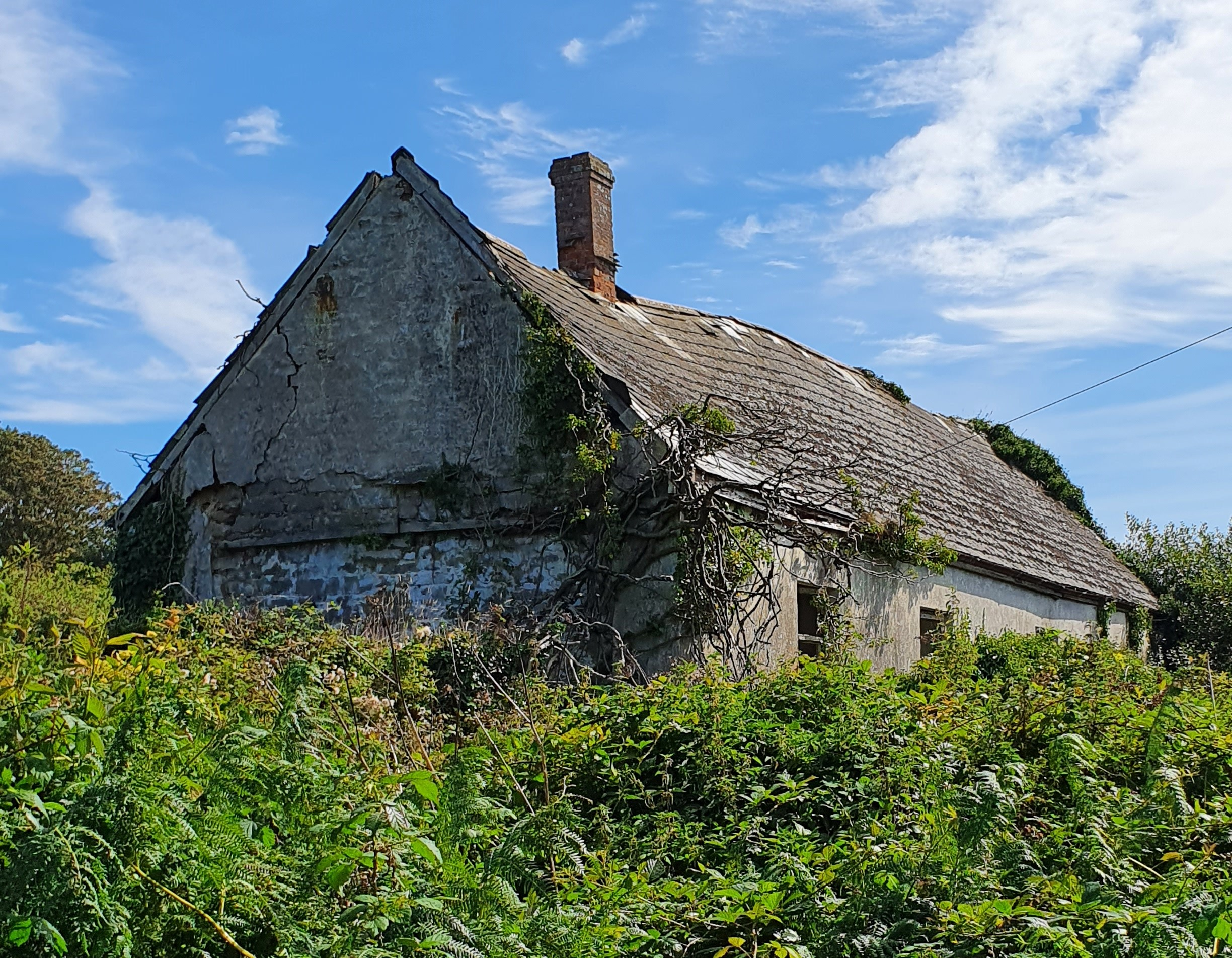

Documentary evidence from 1508 of a mine known as Cog-an-bans (Higher Work) or Goghan Bras (Great Coffin) may relate to this pit. The veins or network of veinlets of tin in this section of the mine are close to the surface and known as the Conqueror branches. The miners followed these veinlets, some of which are still visible through the overgrown vegetation although scarcely wide enough for a man to climb through.

The modern mine was first active from 1855, producing copper until 1884, tin until 1906 and zinc from 1860 until 1876. Arsenic and tungsten were also extracted for short amounts of time. First, a 45-inch pumping engine was in use, later to be replaced by a 70-inch engine on the Harvey's Engine Shaft. By 1864 the mine employed 457 people.

Five lodes were worked at Wheal Fortune. The prefix Great was added to distinguish the mine from the other sixteen or so mines of the same name. In the northern section the Carnmeal lode adjoins Wheal Vor and reached a depth of 150 fathoms. The main part of the mine, 300m to the south and considered to be of great antiquity, is a large openwork (known as a gunnis or coffin) divided in two by a narrow ridge.

In 1868 the Carnmeal lode was abandoned and five engines in the southern part of the mine were put up for sale although the mine managed to carry on until 1912 under different companies, and in 1908–09 under the name New Great Wheal Fortune. Only three people were employed at the mine in 1907. In the 1950s a lone miner is said to have worked the burrows (waste tips) and taken two sacks of wolfram daily to Camborne for sale.

== See also ==
- Mining in Cornwall and Devon
