= Trenwheal =

Hamlet in Cornwall, England

Coordinates: 50.1478°N 5.3390°W

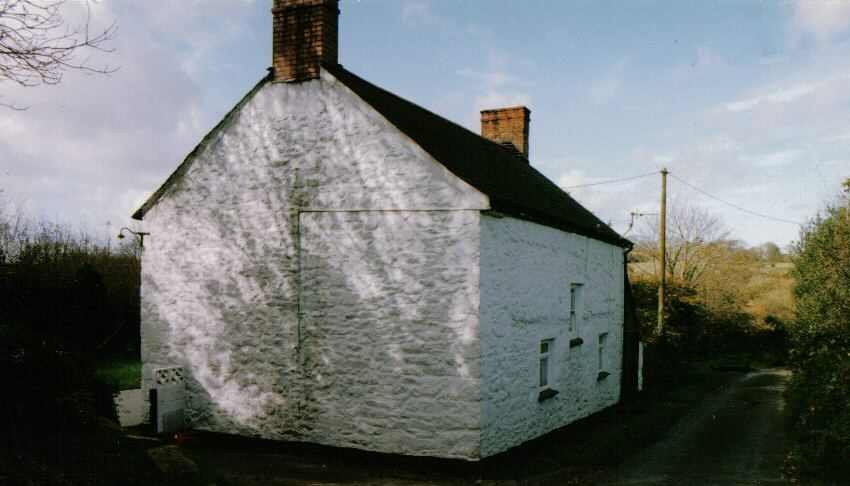

- Location within Cornwall
- Civil parish: Breage
- Unitary authority: Cornwall
- Ceremonial county: Cornwall
- Region: South West
- Country: England
- Sovereign state: United Kingdom
- Police: Devon and Cornwall
- Fire: Cornwall
- Ambulance: South Western

Trenwheal is a hamlet in the civil parish of Breage, Cornwall, England, United Kingdom, and southeast of Leedstown.
