= Gwedna =

Hamlet in Cornwall, England

Coordinates: 50.142°N 5.348°W

Gwedna: Cornish: Gwedna
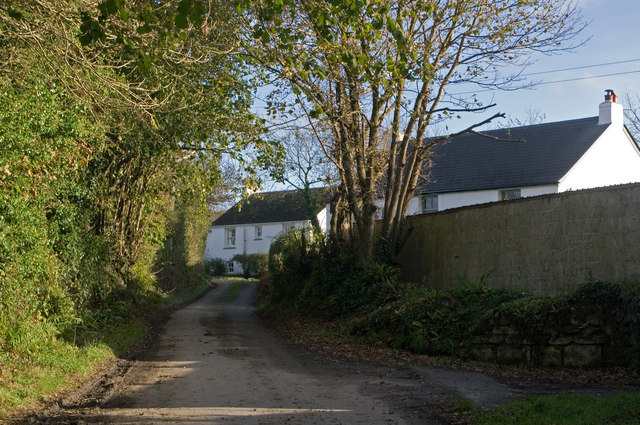

- Location within Cornwall
- OS grid reference: SW609323
- Civil parish: Breage
- Unitary authority: Cornwall
- Ceremonial county: Cornwall
- Region: South West
- Country: England
- Sovereign state: United Kingdom
- Post town: Helston
- Postcode district: TR13 9

Gwedna (Cornish: Gwedna, meaning white) is a hamlet in the civil parish of Breage, in Cornwall, England, UK.
