= Carleen =

Village in Cornwall, England

Coordinates: 50.12°N 5.34°W

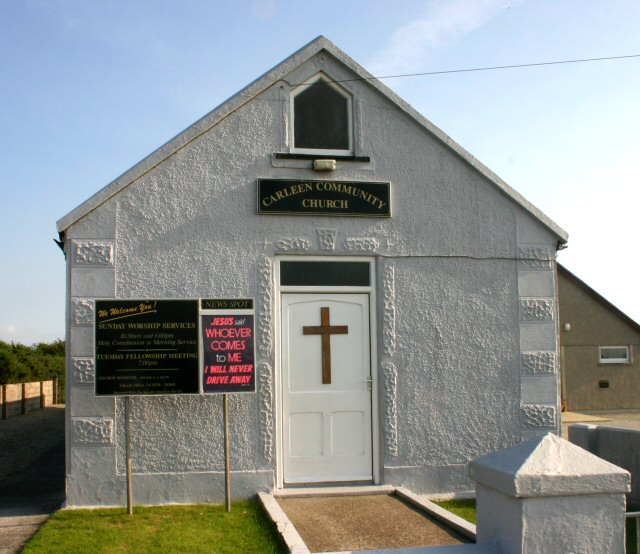
- Carleen Community Church in 2005

- Location within Cornwall
- Civil parish: Breage
- Unitary authority: Cornwall
- Ceremonial county: Cornwall
- Region: South West
- Country: England
- Sovereign state: United Kingdom
- Police: Devon and Cornwall
- Fire: Cornwall
- Ambulance: South Western

Carleen is a village in the parish of Breage, Cornwall, England, about 1.5 miles (2.4 km) north of the village of Breage on the road to Godolphin Cross.

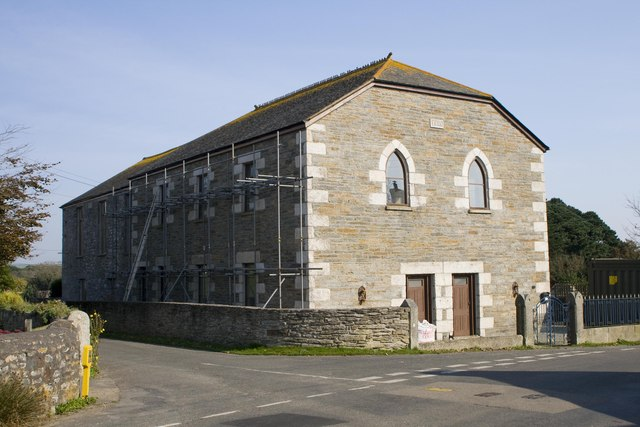
The former Carleen Methodist Church in 2011

Carleen Wesleyan Chapel opened in 1883 and was later renamed Carleen Methodist Church; it closed in 1990. Carleen Community Church is affiliated to the Apostolic Church and runs a day care centre.

The Wheal Vor mine, about 1 mile (1.6 km) to the north east of Carleen, has been described as "one of the biggest and richest Cornish tin mines" of the 19th century. In 2021, Cornish Tin Ltd announced plans for test drilling on the site, its "2021 Exploration Area" including much of Carleen village, and local residents formed the Great Wheal Vor Community and Environment Group to enable them to "make informed decisions concerning activities which will impact their lifestyles and businesses."
