= Ashton, Cornwall =

Village in west Cornwall, England

Coordinates: 50.109°N 5.354°W

Ashton
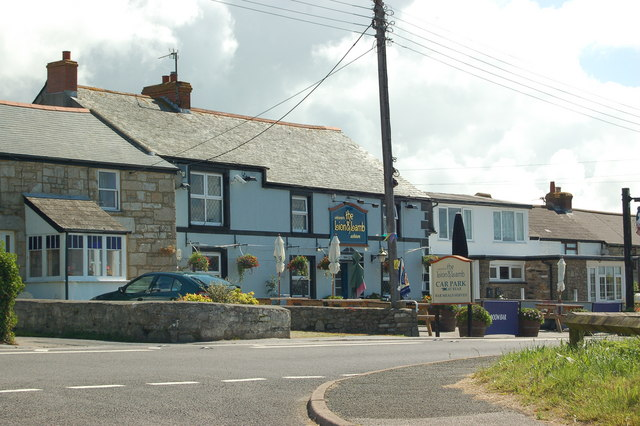
- The Lion and Lamb public house

- Location within Cornwall
- Civil parish: Breage
- Unitary authority: Cornwall
- Ceremonial county: Cornwall
- Region: South West
- Country: England
- Sovereign state: United Kingdom
- Police: Devon and Cornwall
- Fire: Cornwall
- Ambulance: South Western

Ashton (Cornish: Trevonnen) is a village in the civil parish of Breage, west Cornwall, England, UK at OS grid ref SW604286. It is on the A394 Penzance – Helston road one mile north-east of Praa Sands.

A Mission Church designed by James Piers St Aubyn was dedicated by George Wilkinson (Bishop of Truro) on 11 March 1884. Costing between £600 and £700, it is built in the Gothic early-English style on a site donated by the Duke of Leeds. Ashton has a pub called the Lion and Lamb and in the past had a football team.

Ashton is also the name of places in the parishes of Poundstock, St Dominick and St Winnow. The meaning of Ashton is "ash-tree farm".
