= Breaney Methodist chapel =

Methodist chapel near Helston, Cornwall

Coordinates: 50.10512°N 5.33563°W

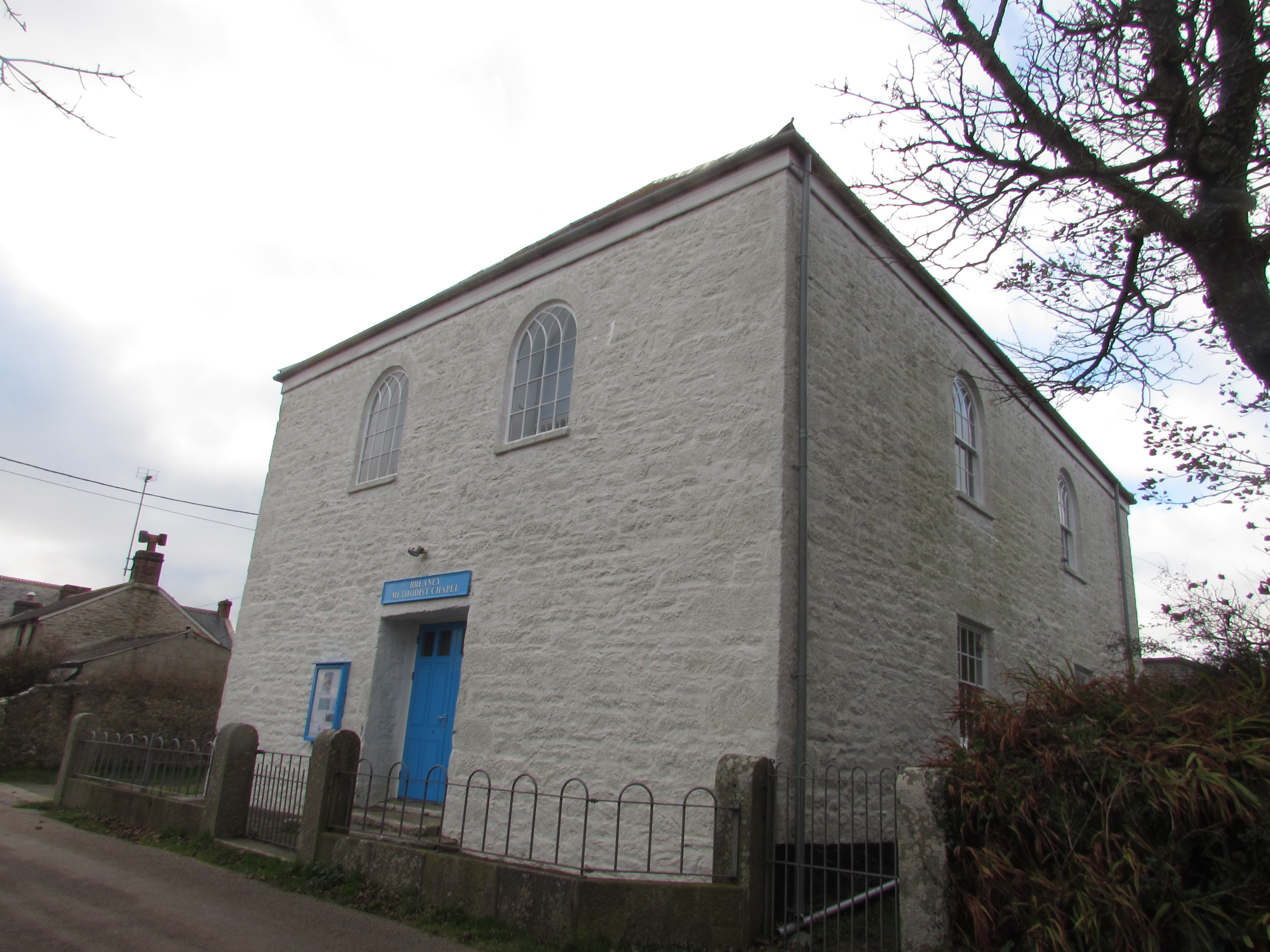
Breaney Methodist chapel

Breaney Methodist chapel is a Methodist chapel in the civil parish of Breage, near Helston, Cornwall, UK. The chapel is on Trewithick road in Breage, past the school. It was built in 1829 for and by the Miners of Breage. There were many other chapels in Breage parish (all of them turned into houses except one which is now a social club). The chapel is listed as of having architectural merit and must be painted white as it is a marker for fishermen in the bay. It was officially called Troon Methodist chapel until 1992 when the name changed to Breaney. Breaney was the name chosen by the uniting congregations of Breage and Sithney obviously taking half of each name! In 1992 the chapel was renovated with a new first floor worship area, new seating, new carpets, new paint, a new organ and more whilst key features such as the gallery pews and plaster columns were retained. In 2016 the future of the chapel was questioned in a rationalisation process by The Lizard & Mounts bay Methodist circuit. After much prayer and discussion the fellowship are seeking new ways to serve the community and share the love of God. The Methodist chapel originally had a very old, mainly wood pipe organ which was fitted in the organ loft but in 1992 the organ was taken out and replaced by an electronic organ.

There is an Ordnance Survey benchmark on the bottom wall of the chapel on a corner.

On 25 August 1987 Breaney Methodist chapel became a Grade II listed building listed as "Breage Methodist Church Including Courtyard Walls And Gate Piers".
