= Trew, Cornwall =

Coordinates: 50.1179°N 5.3341°W

Trew
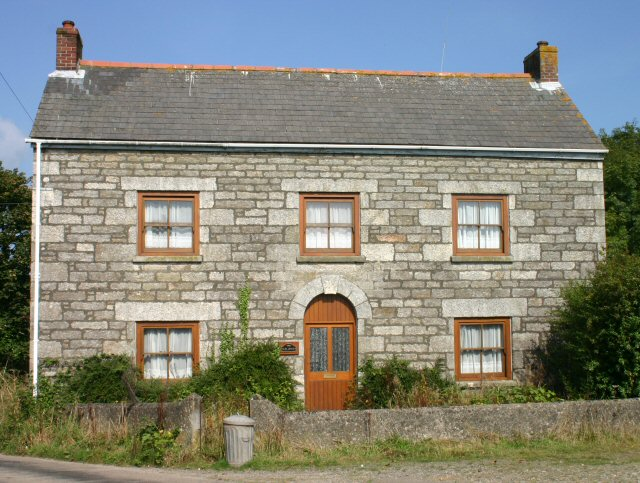
- Trelawney House

- Location within Cornwall
- Civil parish: Breage
- Unitary authority: Cornwall
- Ceremonial county: Cornwall
- Region: South West
- Country: England
- Sovereign state: United Kingdom
- Police: Devon and Cornwall
- Fire: Cornwall
- Ambulance: South Western

Trew is a hamlet in the parish of Breage, Cornwall, England, United Kingdom.
