= Rinsey Croft =

Coordinates: 50°06′18″N 5°21′19″W

- Hamlet
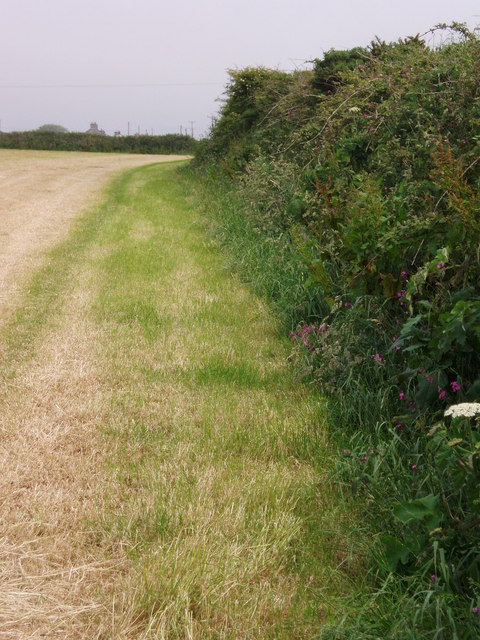
- Lane to Rinsey (Rinsey Croft in the background)

- Location within Cornwall
- OS grid reference: SW 6011 2804
- Civil parish: Breage
- Unitary authority: Cornwall
- Ceremonial county: Cornwall
- Region: South West
- Country: England
- Sovereign state: United Kingdom
- Post town: HELSTON
- Postcode district: TR13
- Dialling code: 01326
- Police: Devon and Cornwall
- Fire: Cornwall
- Ambulance: South Western
- UK Parliament: St Ives

Rinsey Croft is a hamlet in southwest Cornwall, England. It is located within the civil parish of Breage, 1 mile (1.6 km) west of the village of the same name.

The nearby hamlet of Rinsey is located 1 km (0.62 mi) to the southwest.
