= Trescowe =

Coordinates: 50.1266°N 5.3930°W

Trescowe: Cornish: Treskaw
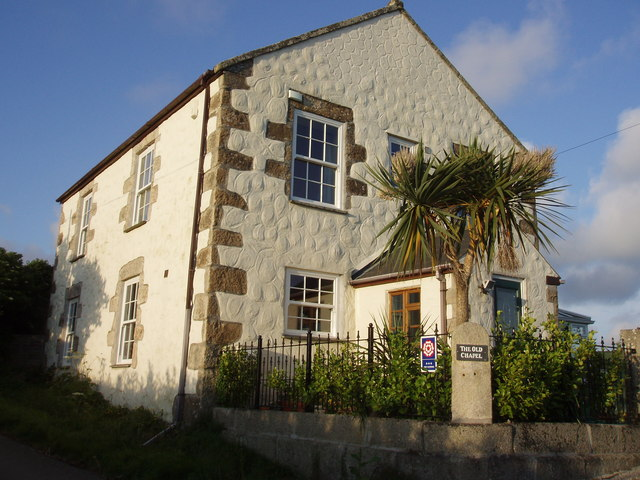
- Old chapel at Trescowe

- Location within Cornwall
- Civil parish: Breage
- Unitary authority: Cornwall
- Ceremonial county: Cornwall
- Region: South West
- Country: England
- Sovereign state: United Kingdom
- Police: Devon and Cornwall
- Fire: Cornwall
- Ambulance: South Western

Trescowe (Cornish: Treskaw) is a hamlet north of Germoe, in the civil parish of Breage, in Cornwall, England, United Kingdom.

The name Trescowe is an anglicisation of the Cornish language Treskaw, which contains the words tre, meaning 'farm' or 'settlement', and skaw, meaning 'elder trees'.
