= Rinsey =

Hamlet in Cornwall, England

Coordinates: 50.097°N 5.366°W

Rinsey: Cornish: Rynnji
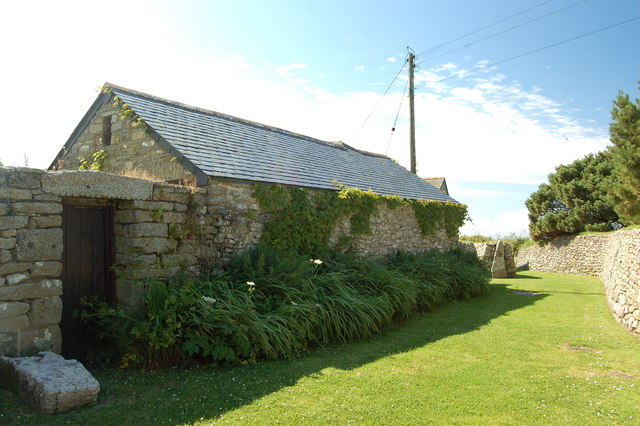
- Cornish stone barn, Rinsey

- Location within Cornwall
- OS grid reference: SW593270
- Civil parish: Breage
- Unitary authority: Cornwall
- Ceremonial county: Cornwall
- Region: South West
- Country: England
- Sovereign state: United Kingdom
- Post town: HELSTON
- Postcode district: TR13
- Dialling code: 01736
- Police: Devon and Cornwall
- Fire: Cornwall
- Ambulance: South Western
- UK Parliament: St Ives

Rinsey (Cornish: Rynnji, meaning hillspur house) is a hamlet in the civil parish of Breage, in Cornwall, England, United Kingdom. It is located off the main A394 road between Helston and Penzance. The nearby hamlet of Rinsey Croft is located 1 km to the north-east. The nearby cliffs and beach are owned and managed by the National Trust and part of Rinsey East Cliff is designated as the Porthcew Site of Special Scientific Interest (SSSI) for its geological interest. The South West Coast Path passes through the property. Rinsey lies within the Cornwall Area of Outstanding Natural Beauty (AONB).

The name Rinsey is an anglicisation of the Cornish language Rynnji, which contains the words rynn 'point of land' (as in Penryn), and chi 'house'.

== History ==
Rinsey, in the Hundred of Kerrier, is mentioned in the Domesday Book as one of four manors in the parish of Breage, under the name of 'Rentis'. The population in 1086 was 9.5 households.

In the 29 April 1880 edition of The Cornishman Rinsey was listed as one of the places in the Helston area with a fishing fleet.

=== Mining ===
Wheal Prosper, (grid reference SW593270) on Rinsey East Cliff, started operating in 1860 possibly as an extension of Wheal Trewavas mine, 800m to the east on Trewavas Cliff (grid reference SW600265). The mine is on the southern end of the Tregonning granite within the Wendron Mining District. By the time Prosper closed in 1866 it had produced mostly tin and a little copper from the Porthcew lode. The prominent house on Rinsey Head is often said to have been the mine's count house (offices), it was built in the late 1920s and early 1930s by Mr G A Gibb, a London stockbroker, after he bought the land from Mr Bucket, a local farmer. Designed as an Arts and Craft style holiday home, rock had to be blasted in order to build the foundations, taking four years to build with stone from a local quarry.

The New Penrose Tin and Copper Mining Company Ltd, which mined Trewavas Head went into liquidation in 1882.

== Natural history ==
In 1990 part of Rinsey Cliff was notified as the Porthcew SSSI for the mineral assemblage caused by the granite contact zone on the Upper Devonian Mylor Slates. The contact zone is also a Geological Conservation Review site of national importance.

Trewarvas Head is the site of a black-legged kittiwake (Rissa tridactyla) colony usually with thirty-five nesting pairs although numbers can vary with just six active nests (all failing) in 2013. Other breeding birds include European shag (Phalacrocorax aristotelis) and European herring gull (Larus argentatus).

== In popular culture ==
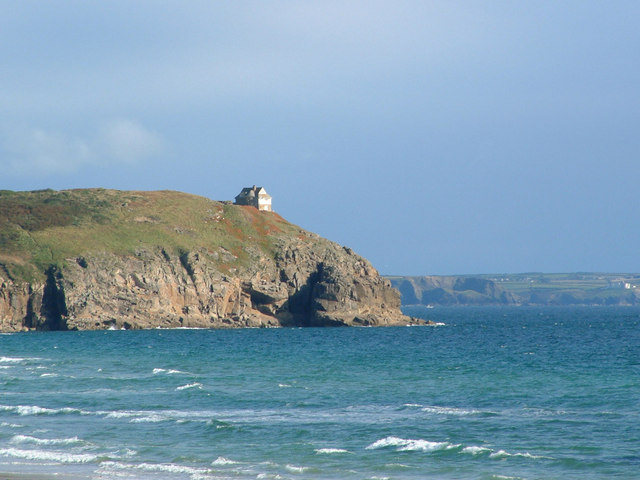
The ″former Count House″ on Rinsey Head which was built, as a holiday home, long after the mines closed.

The house on the Rinsey Head was a setting for a Rosamunde Pilcher story.
