= Praa Sands =

Village and beach in Cornwall, England

Coordinates: 50.1045°N 5.3858°W

Praa Sands: Cornish: Poll an Wragh
- Village
- The beach at Praa Sands

- Location within Cornwall
- Civil parish: Breage
- Shire county: Cornwall
- Region: South West
- Country: England
- Sovereign state: United Kingdom
- Post town: Penzance
- Postcode district: TR20
- Police: Devon and Cornwall
- Fire: Cornwall
- Ambulance: South Western

Praa Sands (/ˈpreɪˈsændz/ pray-sandz; Cornish: Poll an Wragh, meaning pool of the wrasse), (formerly Prah Sands) is a white-sand beach and coastal village in civil parish of Breage, in Cornwall, England. It lies off the A394 road between Helston and Penzance. Formerly serving the local mining industry, it is now mostly a tourist-orientated area. The beach is popular with surfers and walkers. Towards the south eastern end of the beach is a Second World War Type 24 pillbox. Originally this was constructed on top of the cliffs but it has been subjected to coastal erosion and has settled down onto the beach.

== Geography ==
Praa Sands is situated in a sheltered indentation within Mount's Bay; it has a long, wide, sandy, south-facing beach that is lapped by large waves for the area. The beach, which has shallow water and is guarded by seasonal lifeguards, attracts surfers and holidaymakers. Adjacent to the beach are retail outlets serving the holidaymaker.

Praa Sands lies within the Cornwall Area of Outstanding Natural Beauty (AONB). The western side of Praa Sands beach contains Folly Rocks Site of Special Scientific Interest, which is noted for its geological aspects, including a granite porphyry.

== History ==
On 1 February 1882 a pumping engine at Sydney Cove (part of Mount's Bay Consols) was fired. In September 1882 it was reported in The Cornishman newspaper that an engine house was nearly complete and the engine was being put in.

During a World War II air battle against eight German aeroplanes over the Bay of Biscay, a Sunderland flying boat was heavily damaged. The crew returned 800 miles to the Cornish coast, where pilot Colin Walker landed and beached the aircraft at Praa Sands. The people of Praa Sands took the crew into their houses and gave them medical assistance. Walker received the Distinguished Service Order and several of the other crew members also won medals. On 2 June 2013, a memorial was opened on the green at Praa Sands.

Praa sands was a favourite site for testing WWII craft including canoes. On 2 February 1943 the DNC telegraphed the order with the CP contract to Saro’s Ltd Saunders-Roe for the single prototype Mk2* canoe (collapsing vertically) with outriggers. It was completed in three weeks and ready for the Cornwall surf trials at Praa Sands. Trials of this prototype [never produced in this form, subsequently, without outriggers, a Mk2**, a three man version[collapsing vertically] of the Mk2 was], as well as the Mk2, Mk3 (May-Luard) and a kayak were held at Praa Sands in Cornwall in March 1943, which coincided with trials of surf boats. The trials were to observe the behaviour of the canoes in surf. The RMBPD provided an up-to-date version of the Mk2 two man canoe which was the canoe used during the Frankton Raid, undertaken by the Cockleshell Heroes [RMBPD]. The Mk2 was the first purpose-built 'commando' canoe; it was 15 ft long and collapsed vertically to around seven inches.
