= Breage, Cornwall =

Village in Cornwall, England

Coordinates: 50.108°N 5.332°W

Breage: Cornish: Eglosbrek
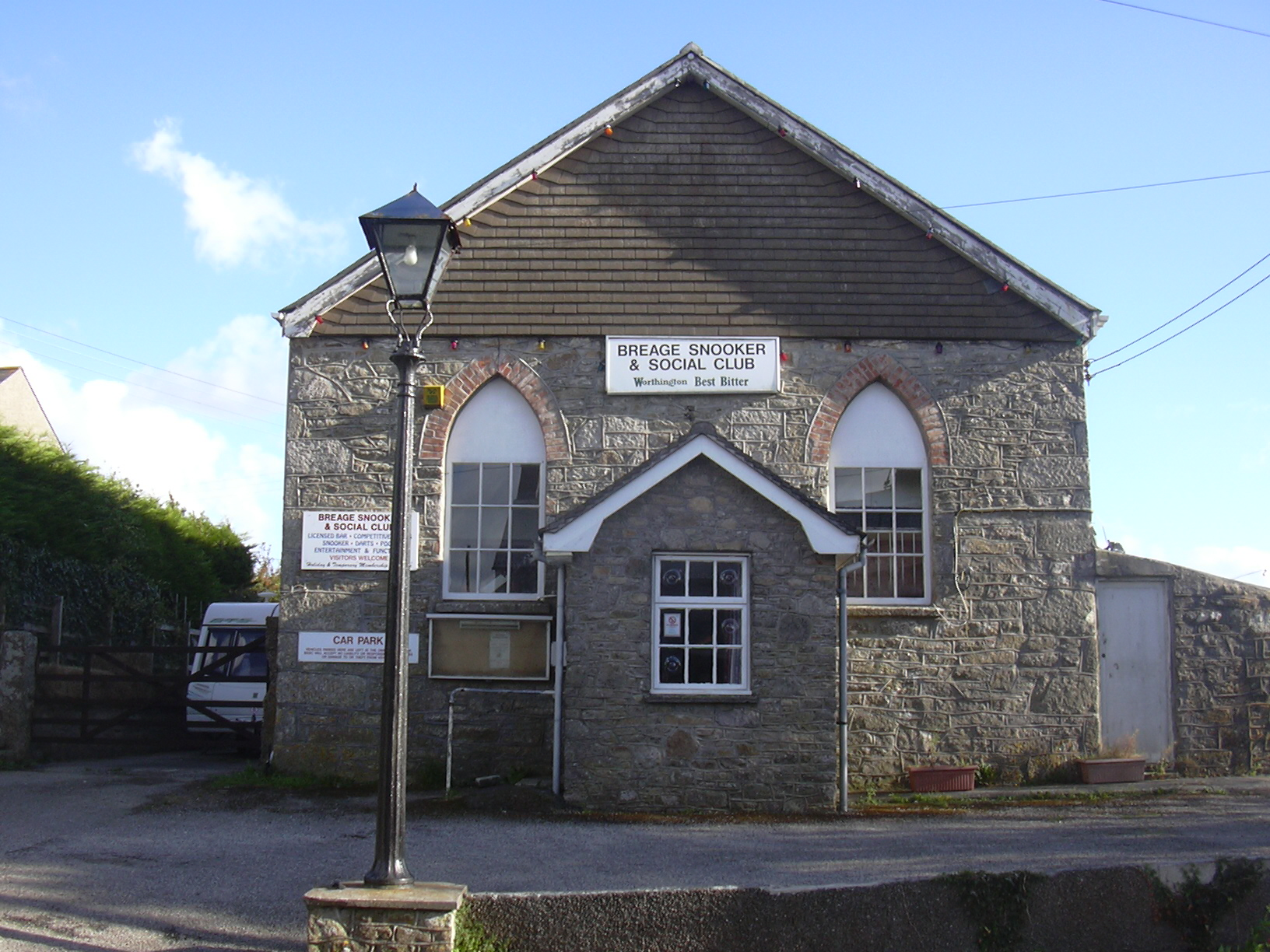
- A former Methodist chapel

- Location within Cornwall
- Population: 3,000 (2011)
- OS grid reference: SW615285
- Unitary authority: Cornwall
- Ceremonial county: Cornwall
- Region: South West
- Country: England
- Sovereign state: United Kingdom
- Post town: HELSTON
- Postcode district: TR13
- Dialling code: 01326
- Police: Devon and Cornwall
- Fire: Cornwall
- Ambulance: South Western
- UK Parliament: St Ives

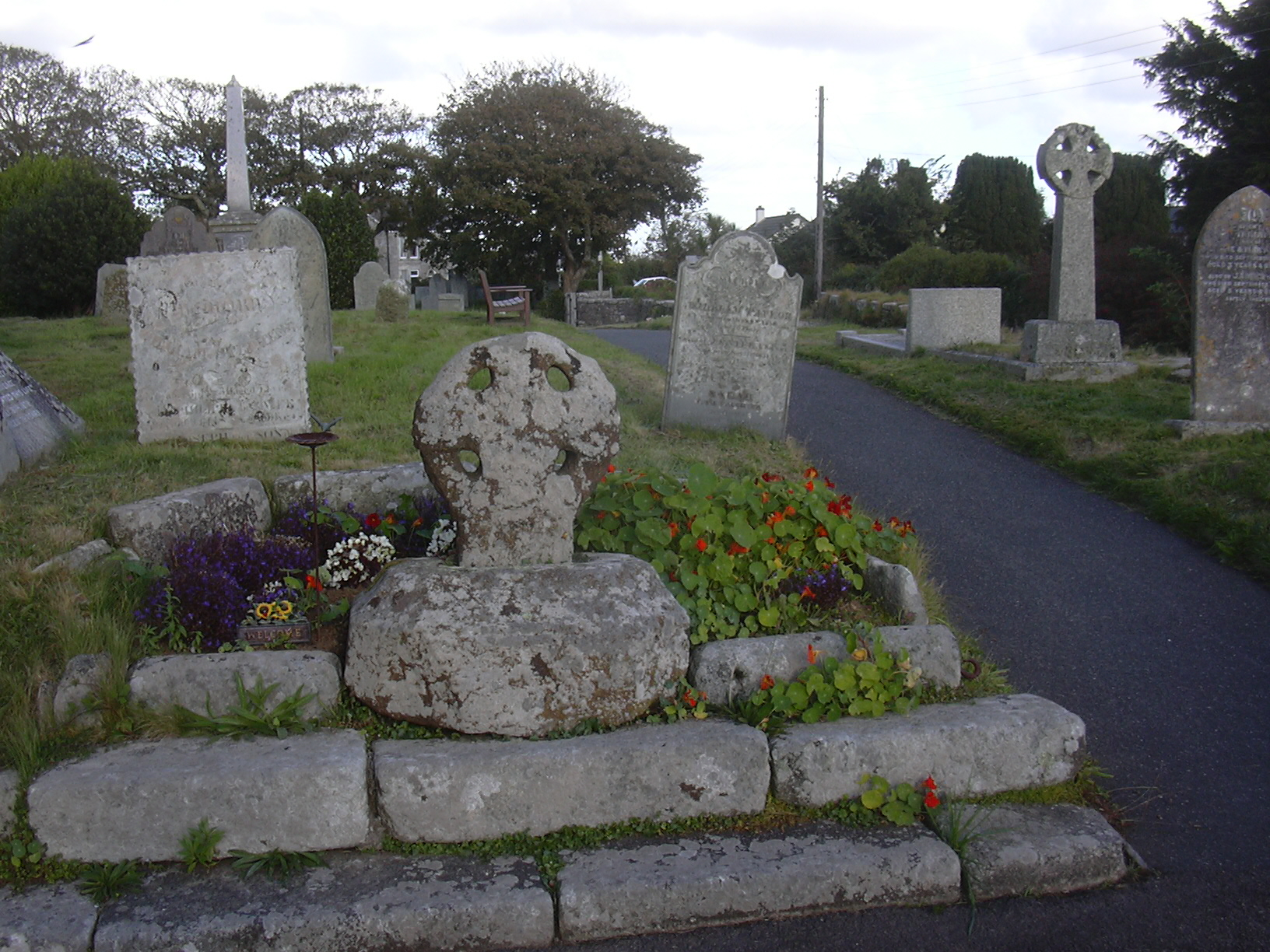
The cross in the churchyard

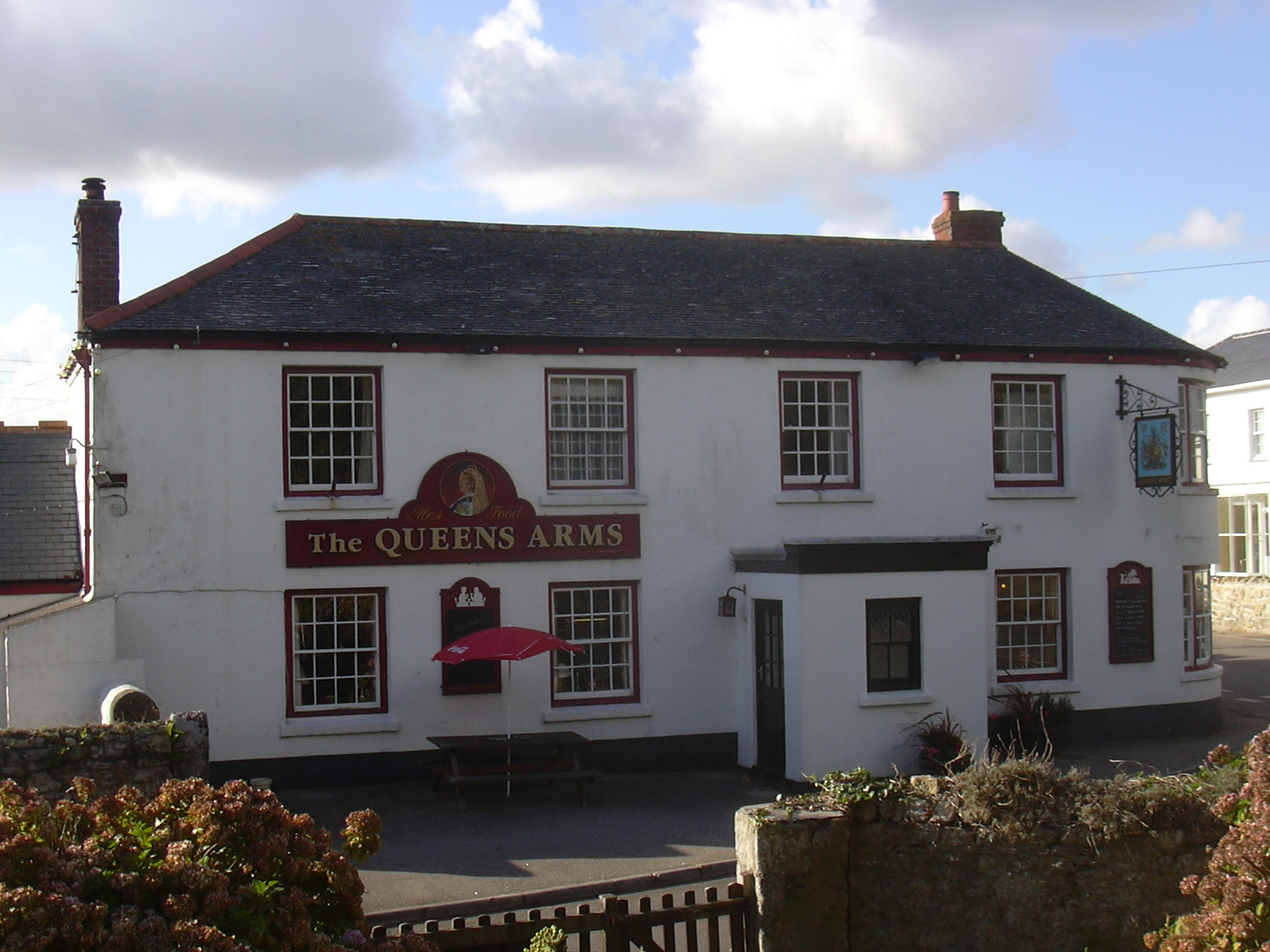
The Queen's Arms Public House in Breage

Breage (/ˈbriːɡ/ BREEG, locally /ˈbreɪɡ/ BRAYG; Cornish: Eglosbrek (village) or Pluw Vrek (parish)) is a village and civil parish in Cornwall, England, United Kingdom. The village is three miles (five kilometres) west of Helston.

Other settlements in the parish include the villages of Ashton, Carleen and Godolphin Cross; the coastal village of Praa Sands; and the Great Work Mine. At the 2021 United Kingdom census, the parish had a population of 3,159.

Breage is named after Saint Breaca, a missionary from Ireland (to whom the 15th-century church is dedicated) and it is in the former Kerrier District.

== History ==
The parish was at the time of Domesday Book within the manor of Binnerton. There were 8 hides of land with enough for 60 ploughs. There were 32 villagers and 25 smallholders with 15 ploughs between them. Apart from the arable land there was two acres (0.8 hectares) of meadow, two square leagues (c. 45 km^{2}) of pasture and 1/2 square league (c. 10 km^{2}) of woodland. Livestock were 45 mares, 13 cattle, 5 pigs and 60 sheep; the annual value was £10.

There are two Cornish crosses in the parish: one which was found buried in the churchyard now stands near the south porch; Trevena cross stands at a road junction about one-half mile (800 metres) north of the churchtown.

== Governance ==
Breage has a parish council, the lowest level of local government. It is in the Cornwall unitary authority area. For elections to Cornwall Council, it is in the Porthleven, Breage and Germoe electoral ward. It was in the Breage, Germoe and Sithney ward between 2013 and 2021. Before 2013, Breage was an electoral ward.

For elections to the Parliament of the United Kingdom it is in St Ives constituency.

== Geography ==
The geological formation known as the Tregonning-Godolphin Granite (one of the granite intrusions in Cornwall that form part of the larger Cornubian batholith) underlies the parish and the area was formerly an important source of tin and copper ore (see Geology of Cornwall). The area has evidence of habitation and mining for the past two millennia. Other than Praa Sands, the villages in the parish were tin and copper mining villages. Breage itself was where the mine owners (or captains) lived as evidenced by the number of fine buildings in the village. The village water pump (presumably now disconnected) still stands today as a relic of the past. Most of today's working population are commuters, travelling to Helston, RNAS Culdrose, Porthleven, Penzance, Falmouth or even further afield. Some residents are still involved in farming or smallholding in the surrounding area. Ashton is at grid reference SW 604 286: it is situated on the A394 Penzance–Helston road 1 mile (1.5 kilometres) north of Praa Sands. Ashton has a pub called the Lion and Lamb and at one time had a football team.

The following villages and hamlets are in the parish: Ashton; Broadlane; Carleen; Godolphin Cross; Gwedna; Hendra; Kenneggy; Millpool; Pengersick; Penhale Jakes; Polladras; Praa Sands; Rinsey; Rinsey Croft; Trenwheal; Trescowe; Tresoweshill; Trevena; and Trew.

=== Protected areas ===
Tregonning Hill, to the west of the parish, was designated a Site of Special Scientific Interest (SSSI) in 1994 for its biological interest. Tremearne Par SSSI and Porthcew SSSI, along the coast west of Porthleven, were designated for their geological interest and are also Geological Conservation Review (GCR) sites. Great Wheal Fortune was a small mine in operation between 1855 and 1880 and produced 2992 tons of tin, 322 tons of copper and some arsenic and tungsten. In 1991 it was designated a SSSI and is also a GCR site of national importance.

== Parish church and church school ==
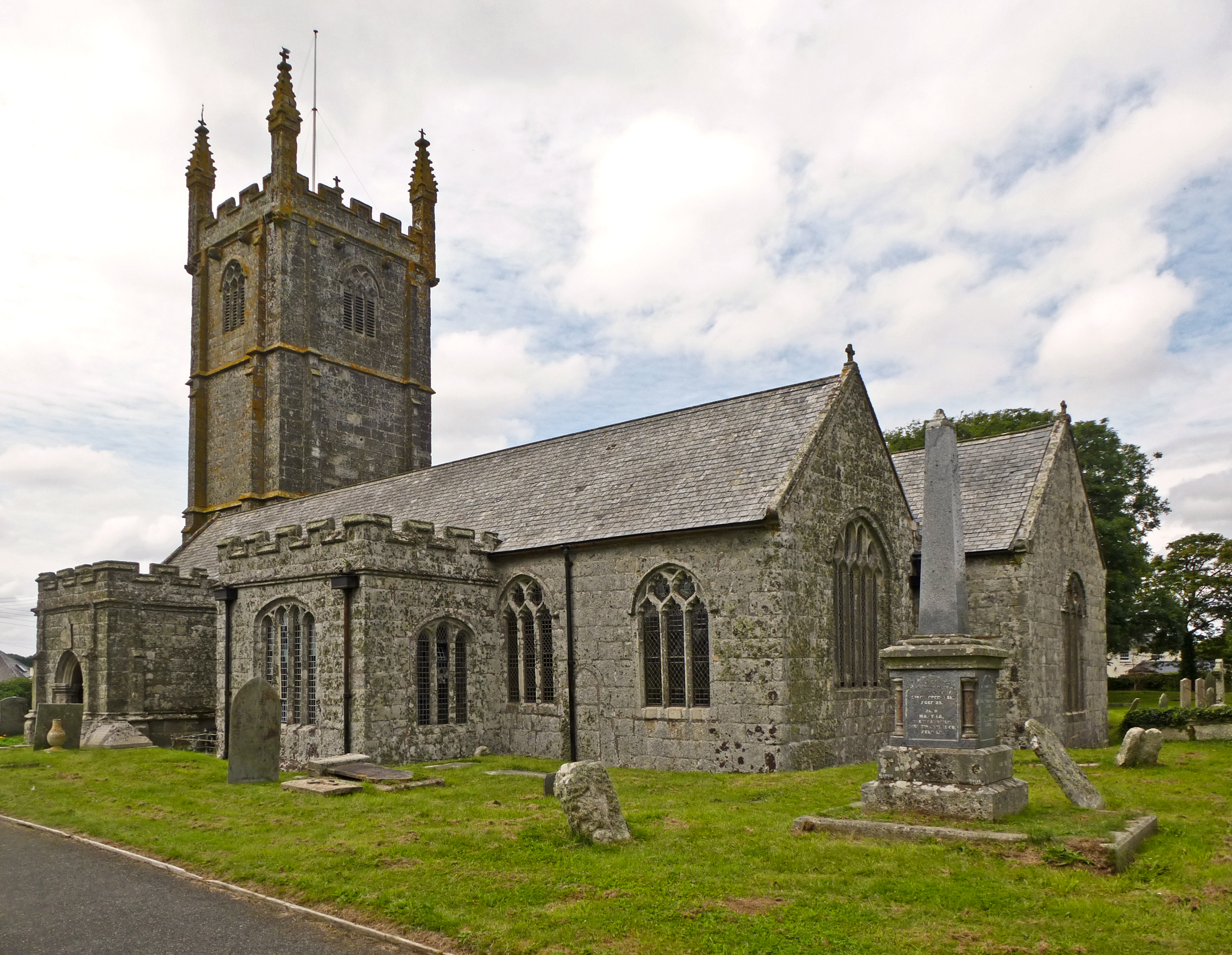
St Breaca's Church

The church was built of granite in the 15th century: on the north wall are five medieval wall paintings. A Roman milestone of the 3rd century is preserved in the church, suggesting that there is a Roman road nearby, and in the churchyard there is an unusual Hiberno-Saxon cross head. The inscription on the milestone is: IMP [C] DO NO MARC CASSI: this incomplete text refers to the Emperor (Marcus Cassianus) Postumus, 258–68 AD (Collingwood, RIB no. 2232).

There is also a Methodist church in the village known as Breaney Methodist chapel which is on Trevithick road.

The local primary school is Breage Church of England VA Primary School, established in the 1840s.

== Notable people ==
- John Militon (died 1549), of Pengersick Castle, was Governor of St Michael's Mount, Cornwall, in 1547.
- Sidney Godolphin (1610–1643), the Cavalier poet and courtier, was baptised in Breage.
- Sidney Godolphin, 1st Earl of Godolphin (1645–1712), statesman.
- Major-General David Tyacke (1915–2010), the last Commanding Officer of the Duke of Cornwall's Light Infantry was born and buried in Breage, where his family had been involved in tin-mining since the early 18th century.
