= Godolphin Cross =

Village in Cornwall, England

Coordinates: 50°08′00″N 5°20′53″W

Godolphin Cross: Cornish: Krows Hirlan
- Village
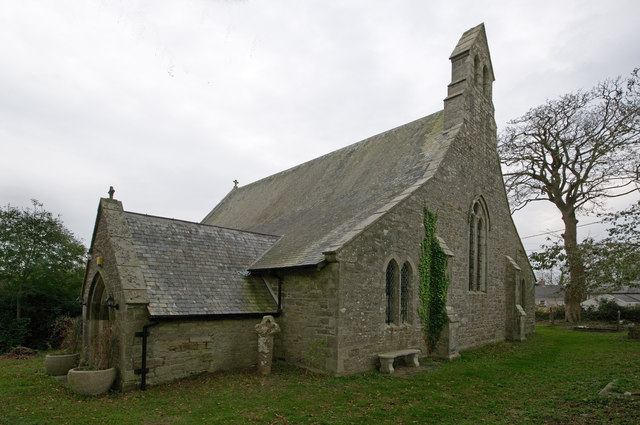
- St John's Church

- Location within Cornwall
- Population: 694 (as of 2018)
- OS grid reference: SW607313
- Civil parish: Breage
- Shire county: Cornwall
- Region: South West
- Country: England
- Sovereign state: United Kingdom
- Post town: HELSTON
- Postcode district: TR13
- Dialling code: 01736
- Police: Devon and Cornwall
- Fire: Cornwall
- Ambulance: South Western
- UK Parliament: St Ives

Godolphin Cross (Cornish: Krows Hirlan) is a village in the civil parish of Breage, in west Cornwall, England. It is midway between the towns of Hayle and Helston. From 1974 until 2009 it was in Kerrier district.

Godolphin Cross is in an upland area, part of a geological formation known as the Tregonning-Godolphin Granite. The term refers to the plateau of high ground in this area, one of five granite batholiths in Cornwall (see Geology of Cornwall). One mile west of the village, Godolphin Hill rises to 162 metres (531 ft).

The Godolphin Estate is near the village. It is now completely owned by the National Trust, and is undergoing extensive renovation. The whole estate and surrounding woodlands are once again open to the public, who were excluded from most of the estate by the former owners. Godolphin Primary School serves children from 4 to 11 years and had a roll of 82 children in November 2021. It received a good Ofsted report in June 2015.

The Church of St John the Baptist is now redundant. It was designed by James Piers St Aubyn and built in 1849–50. In 2006, an application was received by Kerrier District Council to convert the church into a private dwelling.

There is a Cornish cross in the churchyard. In 1886 it was moved to the churchyard, having been found in use as a gatepost on the Chytodden estate.

In 2017 funds for the purchase of the village hall were provided by Sheikh Mohammed bin Rashid Al Maktoum, the ruler of Dubai. Villagers had appealed to him for help, on the basis of the connection between the village and Godolphin Arabian, one of three stallions from which all thoroughbreds are descended. Al Maktoum is the owner of the Godolphin Racing stable. The building was formerly the Methodist Chapel and school room.

== Cornish wrestling ==
Cornish wrestling prize tournaments were held in the 19th century at various venues in the village, including at the former Britannia Inn.
