= Land's End (electoral division) =

Electoral division of Cornwall in the UK

- ward Cornwall Council
- Boundary of Land's End in Cornwall from 2021.
- County: Cornwall

Current ward
- Created: 2021
- Councillor: Brian Clemens (Independent)
- Number of councillors: One
- Created from: St Buryan; St Just in Penwith

Land's End is an electoral division of Cornwall in the United Kingdom which returns one member to sit on Cornwall Council. It was created at the 2021 local elections, being created from the former divisions of St Buryan, and St Just in Penwith. The current councillor is Brian Clemens, an independent.

== Boundaries ==
Land's End represents the parishes of Sancreed, Sennen, St Just, and St. Levan.

The parish of Sancreed includes the villages and hamlets of Brane, Drift, Grumbla, Lower Bodimar, Sancreed, Sellan, and the hamlet of Newbridge, which is shared with the electoral division of Ludgvan.

The parish of Sennen includes the villages and hamlets of Carn Towan, Escalls, Mayon, Sennen, Sennen Cove, and Trevilley.

The parish of St Just includes the town of St. Just in Penwith, and the villages and hamlets of Higher Bojewyan, Lower Boscaswell, Higher Boscaswell, Bosavern, Boscean, Carnyorth, Gulval, Heamoor, Madron, Pendeen, Portherras, Tregeseal, Tregiffian, Trewellard.

The parish of St Levan includes the villages and hamlets of Rospletha, Porthcurno, St Levan, Trebehor, Treen, Trethewey, and the hamlets of Bottoms, and Penberth, which are shared with the electoral division of Mousehole, Newlyn and St Buryan.

== Councillors ==
Election	Member	Party
2021	Brian Clemens	Independent

== Election results ==
=== 2021 election ===
2021 election: Land's End
Party	Candidate	Votes	%	±%
Independent	Brian Clemens	1,089	40.2	N/A
Liberal Democrats	Chris Denley	730	26.9	N/A
Conservative	Alison Thomas	408	15.1	N/A
Green	Ben Jordan	248	9.2	N/A
Mebyon Kernow	Mitchell Holmes	235	8.7	N/A
Majority		359	13.2	N/A
Rejected ballots		18	0.7	N/A
Turnout		2,728		N/A
Independent win (new seat)				

2025 election:
Party	Candidate	Votes	%	±%
Independent	Brian Paul Clemens*	1,185	50.4	+10.2
Reform	Marie Christopher	448	19.1	N/A
Liberal Democrats	Marianna Alicia Baxter	320	13.6	−13.3
Green	Ian Edward Flindall	314	13.4	+4.2
Conservative	Jonah Parsley	83	3.5	−11.6
Majority		737	31.4	+18.2
Rejected ballots		14	0.6	
Turnout		2,350		
Registered electors		5,413		
Independent hold		Swing		
