= St Buryan (electoral division) =

Electoral division of Cornwall in the UK

- Former ward Cornwall Council
- Boundary of St Buryan in from 2013-2021.
- County: Cornwall

2013–2021
- Number of councillors: One
- Replaced by: Land's End; Ludgvan, Madron, Gulval and Heamoor; Mousehole, Newlyn and St Buryan
- Created from: St Buryan

2009–2013
- Number of councillors: One
- Replaced by: St Buryan
- Created from: Council created

St Buryan (Cornish: Eglosveryan) was an electoral division of Cornwall in the United Kingdom which returned one member to sit on Cornwall Council between 2009 and 2021. It was abolished at the 2021 local elections, being succeeded by Land's End, Ludgvan, Madron, Gulval and Heamoor, and Mousehole, Newlyn and St Buryan.

== Councillors ==
Election	Member	Party
2009	Bill Maddern	Conservative
2013	Bill Maddern	Conservative
2017	Helen Hawkins	Liberal Democrat
2021	Seat abolished	

== Extent ==
St Buryan represented the villages of Madron, Sancreed, Drift, Lamorna, St Buryan, Penberth, Treen, Porthgwarra, Porthcurno, Sennen and Sennen Cove, and the hamlets of Great Bosullow, Little Bosullow, Lower Bodinnar, Newbridge, Grumbla, Tregavarah, Brane, Crows-an-Wra, Kerris, Castallack, Tregadgwith, Trevorgans, Bottoms, St Levan, Trethewey, Trebehor, Trevescan, Mayon, Carn Towan and Escalls.

The division was nominally abolished during boundary changes at the 2013 election. From 2009 to 2013, the division covered 9,518 hectares in total; after the boundary changes in 2013, it covered 8,998 hectares.

== Election results ==
=== 2017 election ===
2017 election: St Buryan
Party	Candidate	Votes	%	±%
Liberal Democrats	Helen Hawkins	604	33.6	▲26.3
Conservative	Adrian Semmens	555	30.9	▼9.5
Independent	Bill Maddern	338	18.8	New
Labour	Jane Dunsmuir	211	11.7	▼2.0
UKIP	Mary Smith	82	4.6	New
Majority		49	2.7	N/A
Rejected ballots		6	0.3	▲0.1
Turnout		1796	50.6	▲9.6
Liberal Democrats gain from Conservative		Swing		

=== 2013 election ===
2013 election: St Buryan
Party	Candidate	Votes	%	±%
Conservative	Bill Maddern	608	40.4	▼6.8
Independent	Norman Bliss	429	28.5	New
Labour	Juliet Eavis	206	13.7	New
Green	Peter Hardy	150	10.0	▼10.1
Liberal Democrats	Frank Blewett	110	7.3	▼24.8
Majority		179	11.9	▼3.2
Rejected ballots		3	0.2	▼0.4
Turnout		1506	41.0	▼5.7
Conservative hold		Swing		

=== 2009 election ===
2009 election: St Buryan
Party	Candidate	Votes	%	±%
Conservative	Bill Maddern	814	47.2	
Liberal Democrats	Sharon Brolly	554	32.1	
Green	Rob Pickering	347	20.1	
Majority		260	15.1	
Rejected ballots		10	0.6	
Turnout		1725	46.7	
Conservative win (new seat)				
