= B3306 road =

Major road in Cornwall, England

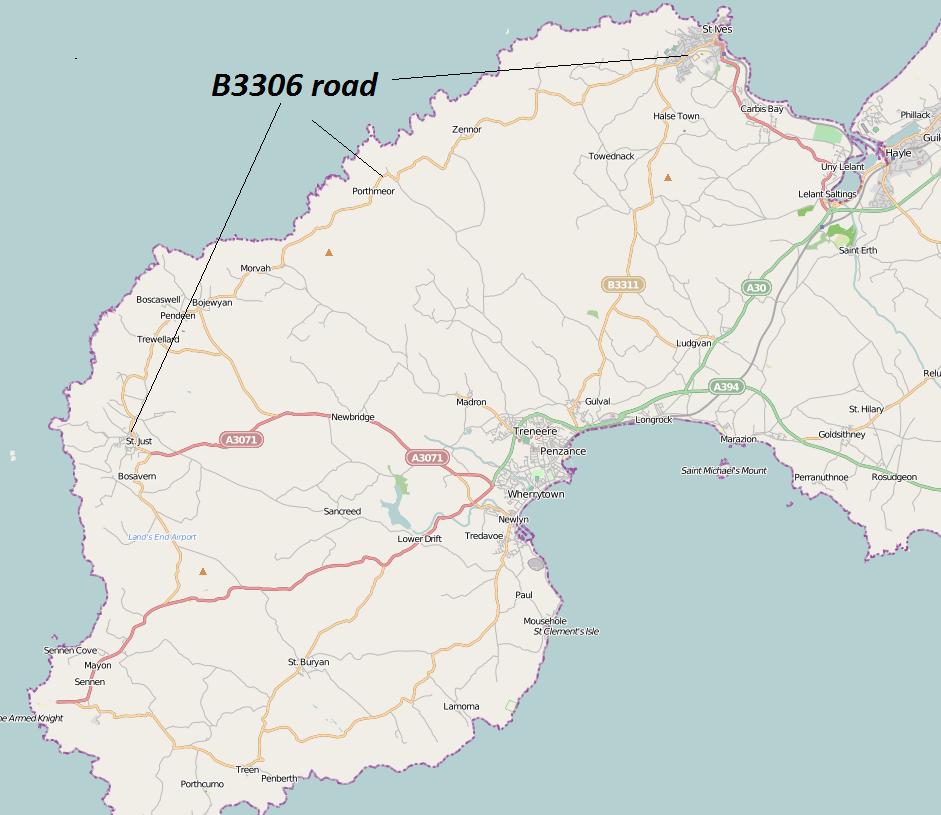
Map of B3306 road in southwestern Cornwall

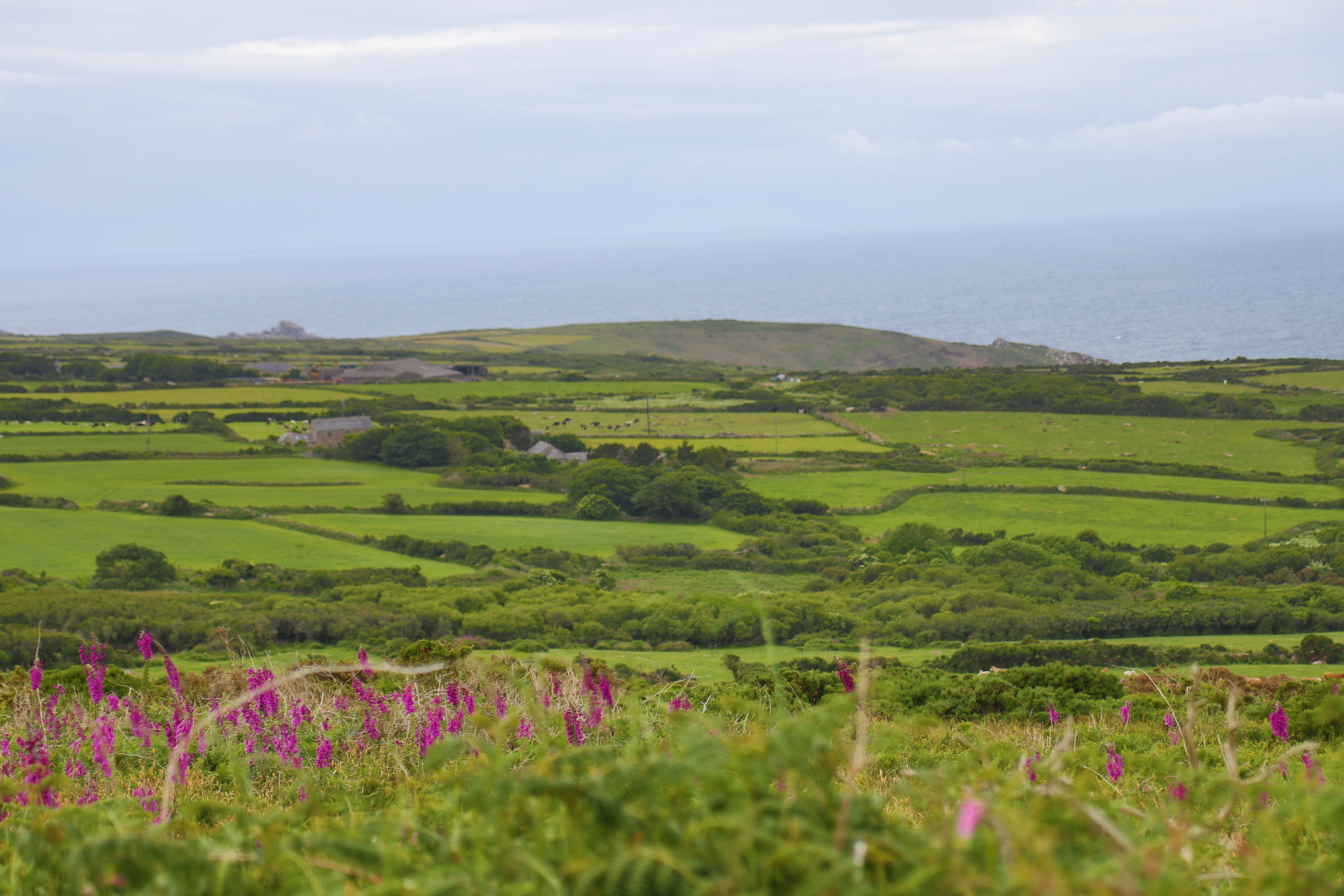
Beautiful Scene near B3306 North Coast Road

The B3306, also known as the West Cornwall Coast Road, is a major road of southwestern Cornwall. It connects St Ives in the east to St Just in the west, and eventually joins the A30 road to the northeast of Sennen in the southwest of the Penwith peninsula. This thirteen-mile road is often considered one of the greatest driving roads in the United Kingdom for its scenery, with most of the road having views both across the Celtic Sea to the north, and the Cornish moorland to the south. It hugs the coastline for a great proportion of its length.

== Description ==
The road begins in the town of St Ives, adjacent to St Ives Library, on the junction with the A3074 road at 50°12′41″N 5°28′51″W. In St Ives it is initially known as "Gabriel Street" and then "The Stennack" and "Higher Stennack". The road ends at the junction with the A30 road at 50°5′15″N 5°40′13″W, outside St Just. Notable settlements it passes through (from St Ives to the southwest) include Zennor, Boswednack, Treen, Porthmeor, Morvah, Bojewyan, Pendeen, Trewellard, Carnyorth, Botallack, Kenidjack, St Just, Bosavern and Kelynack. The bridge near St Just, dated to the early 19th century, became a Grade II listed building on 21 September 1973.

A number of notable early Bronze Age or Neolithic sites lie alongside or immediately off this road, including Zennor Quoit, Sperris Quoit, Chûn Quoit and Lanyon Quoit. The road is tight and twisting, and challenging to drivers. In early 2009, after heavy rain and flooding near Zennor, the road was closed at Chykembro Culvert because of flood damage to its foundations.

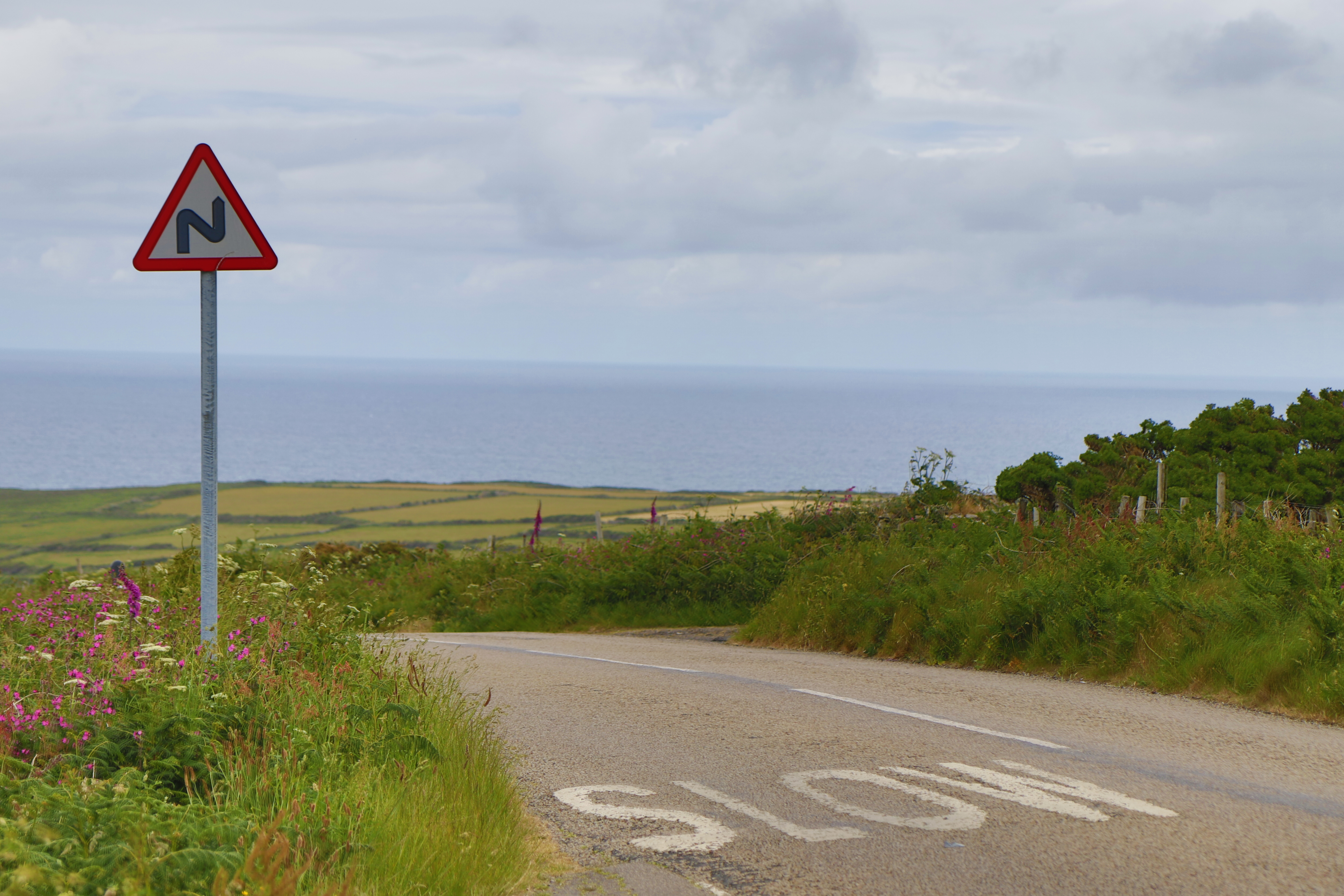
B3306 North Coast Road

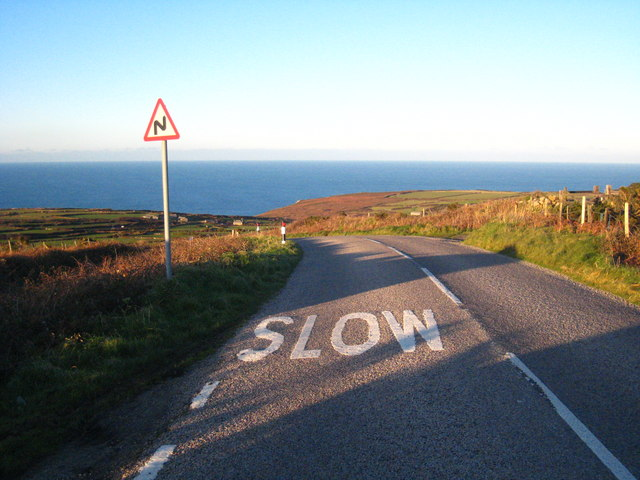
The B3306 near Boscubben (northeast of Zennor)

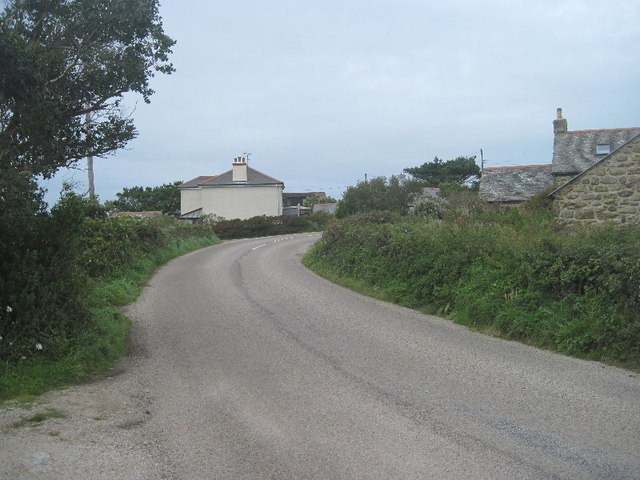
The B3306 at Boswednack
