= Levant Mine and Beam Engine =

Mine in Cornwall, UK

- Hwel ha Jynn Keber Levant (Cornish)
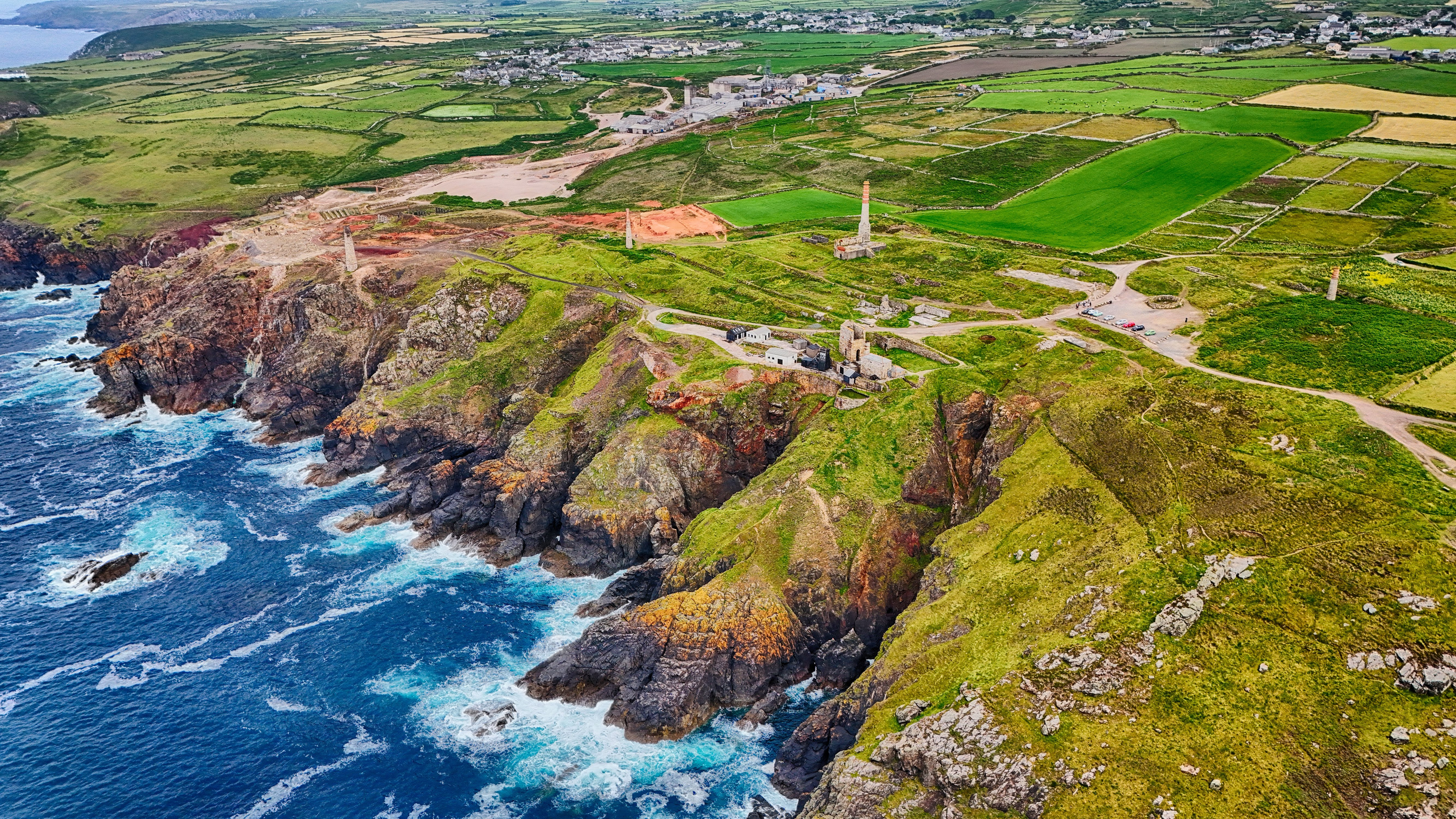
- Levant Mine seen from the air in 2020

- Location within Cornwall
- 50°09′08″N 5°41′08″W
- Type: industrial heritage, mine
- Location: Trewellard, Cornwall, England

Site notes
- Owner: National Trust

UNESCO World Heritage Site
- Type: Cultural
- Criteria: ii, iii, iv
- Designated: 2006 (30th session)
- Part of: Cornwall and West Devon Mining Landscape
- Reference no.: 1215
- Region: Europe and North America

Listed Building – Grade II
- Official name: Levant Engine Houses
- Designated: 19 March 1979
- Reference no.: 1143268

Listed Building – Grade II
- Official name: Skip Shaft Headframe, Geevor Mine (Levant Section)
- Designated: 13 July 2011
- Reference no.: 1401870

Listed Building – Grade II
- Official name: Higher Levant Mine
- Designated: 11 June 2019
- Reference no.: 1460143

Levant Mine and Beam Engine (Cornish: Hwel ha Jynn Keber Levant) is a National Trust property at Trewellard, Pendeen, near St Just, Cornwall, England, UK. Its main attraction is that it has the world's oldest Cornish steam winding engine still working in its original location (and the last such engine still in steam in Cornwall). There is also a visitor centre, a short underground tour, and the South West Coast Path leads to Botallack Mine, via a cliff-top footpath.

In 1919 the engine used to transport men between the different levels of the mine failed, leading to the deaths of thirty-one men. Since 2006, the area has been part of the UNESCO World Heritage Site, Cornwall and West Devon Mining Landscape.

== Location ==
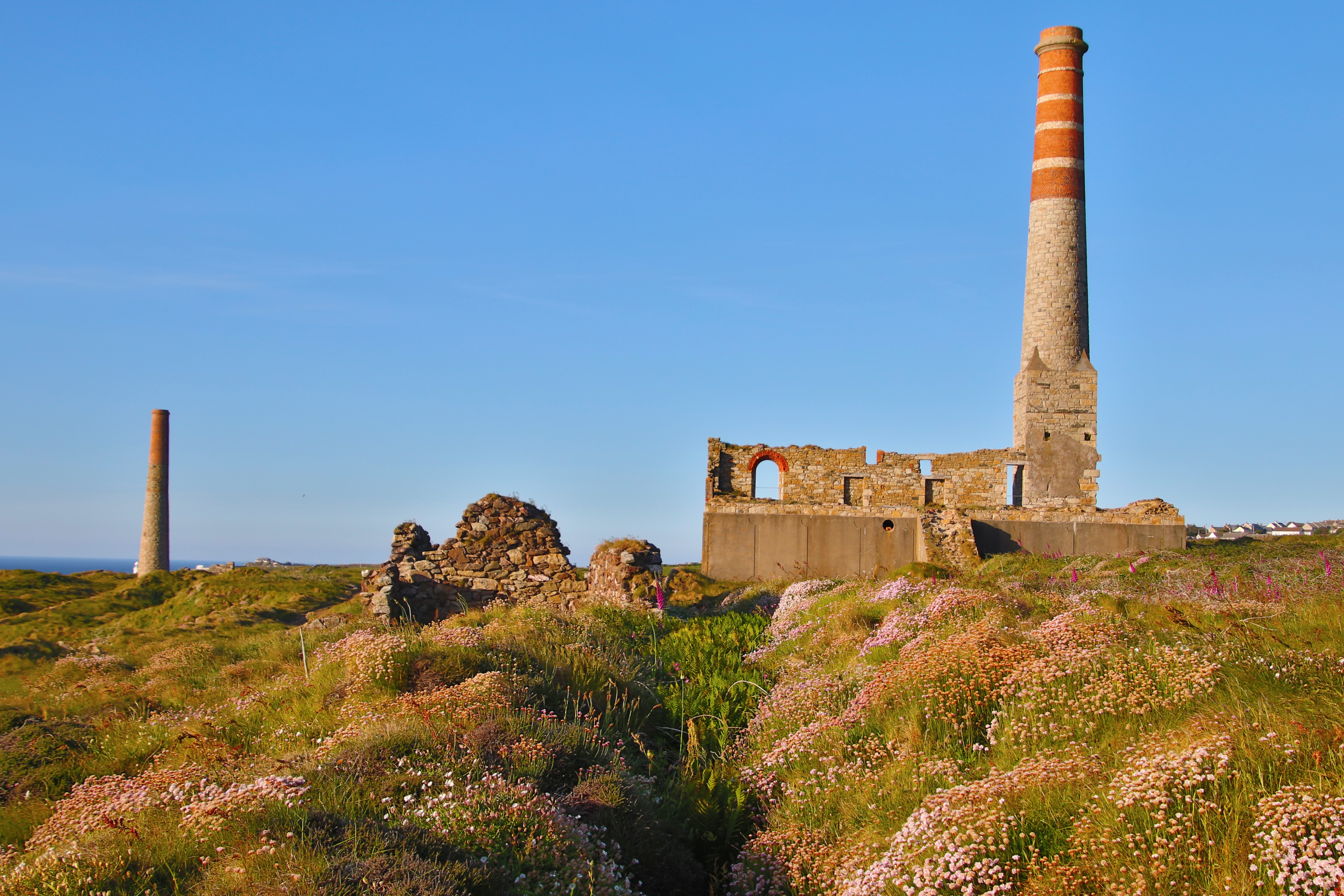
Levant Mine and ruins in 2020

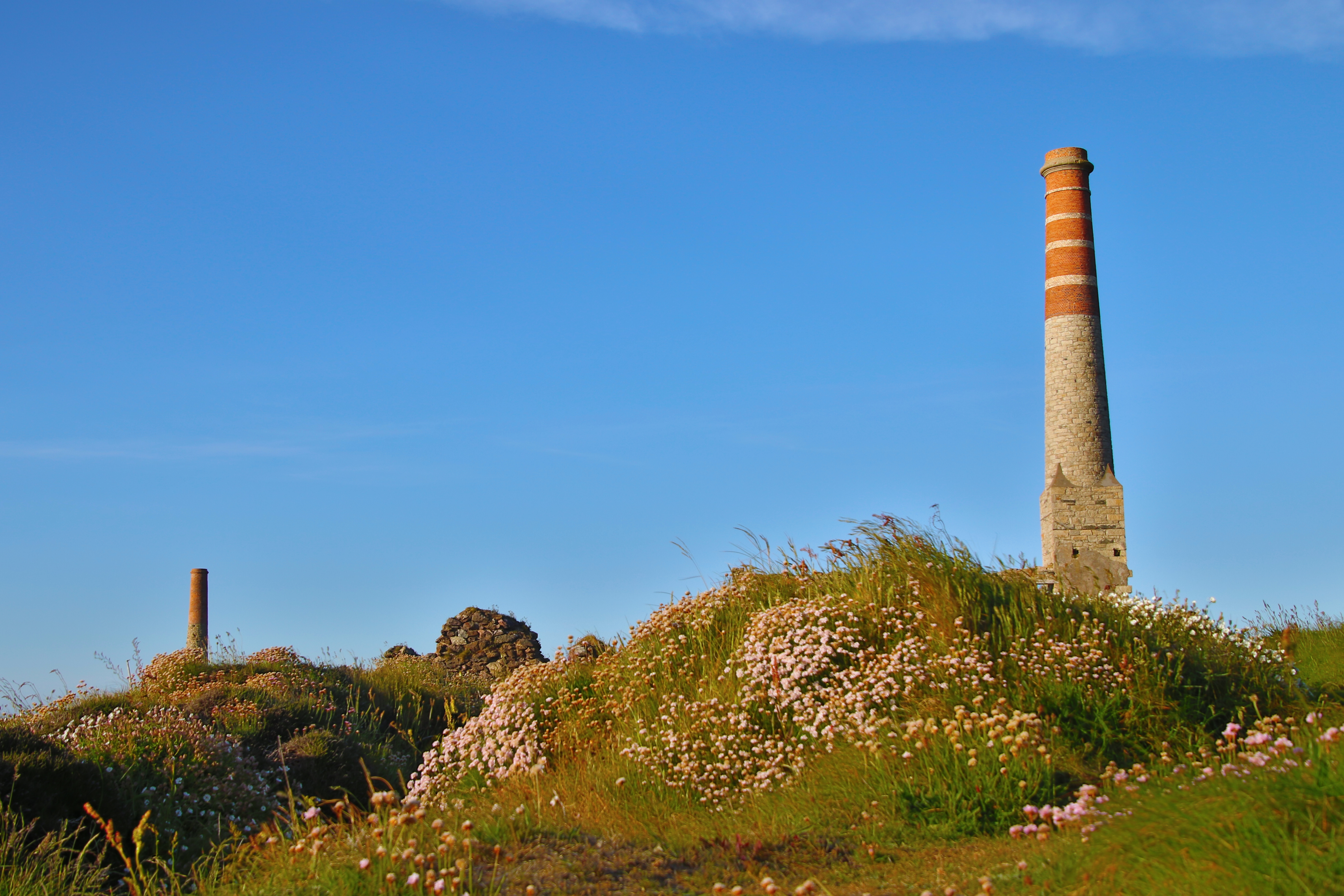
Looking up at Levant Mine

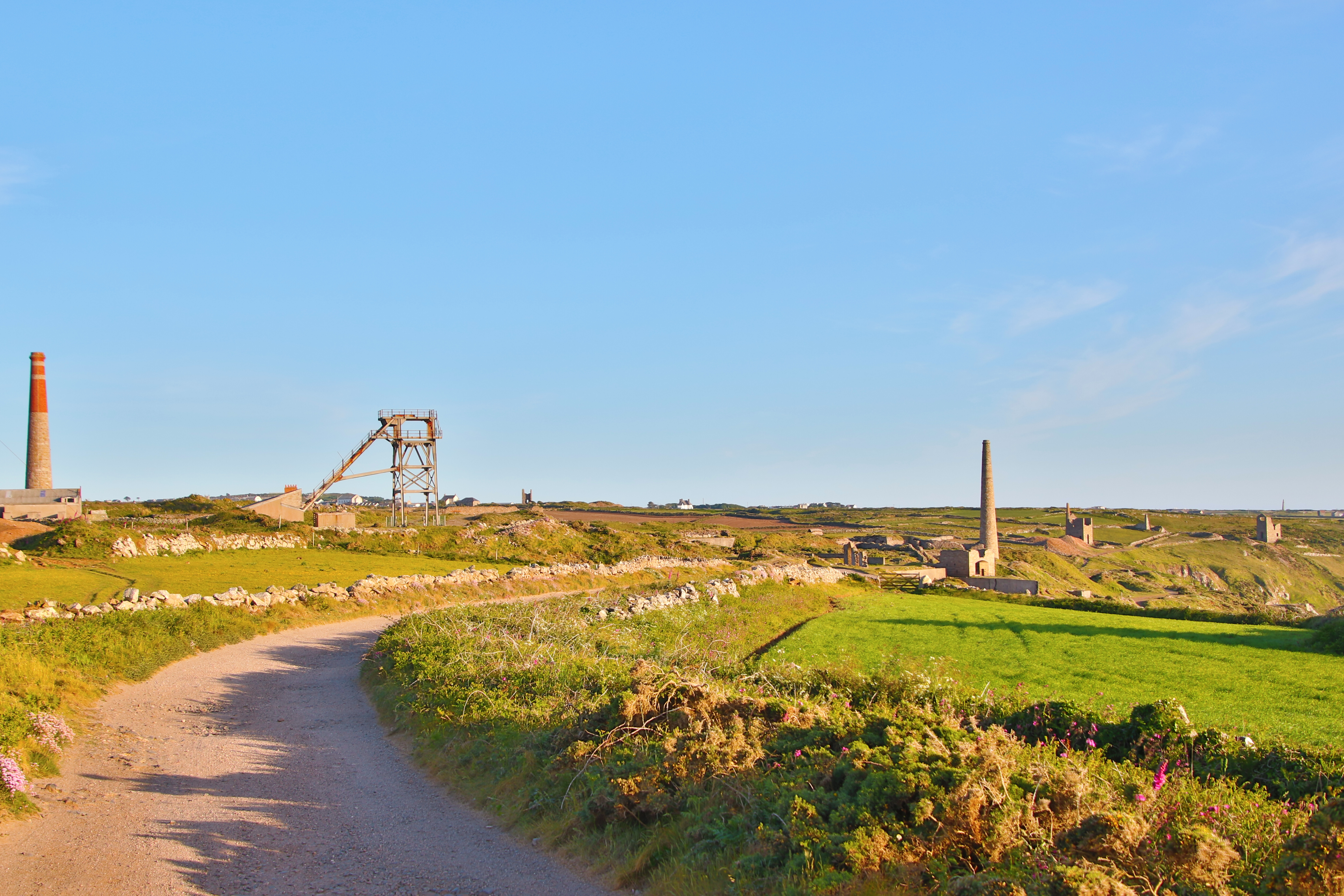
Levant Mine Landscape. See sketch map above to locate features.

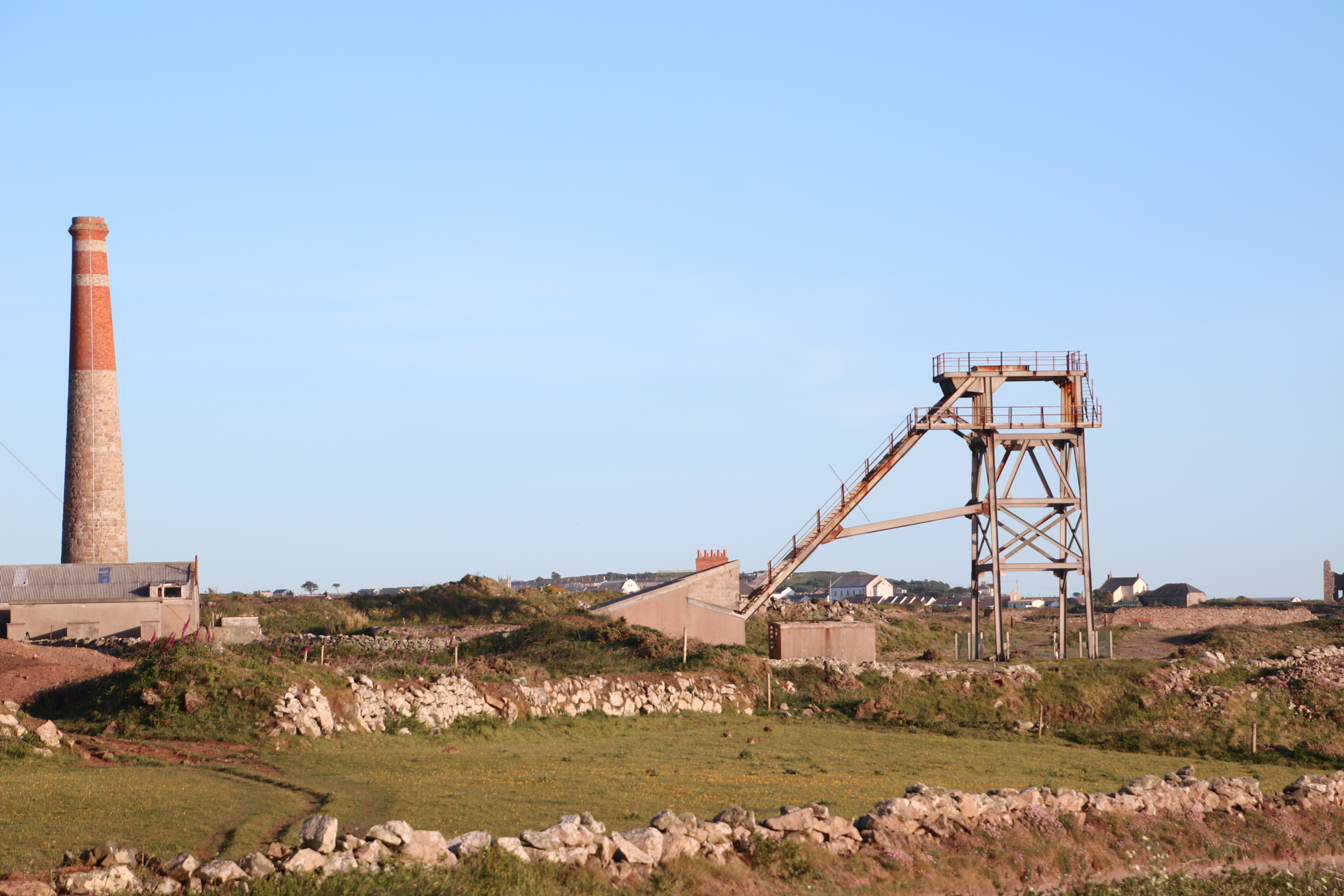
Levant Mine, Cornwall in 2020

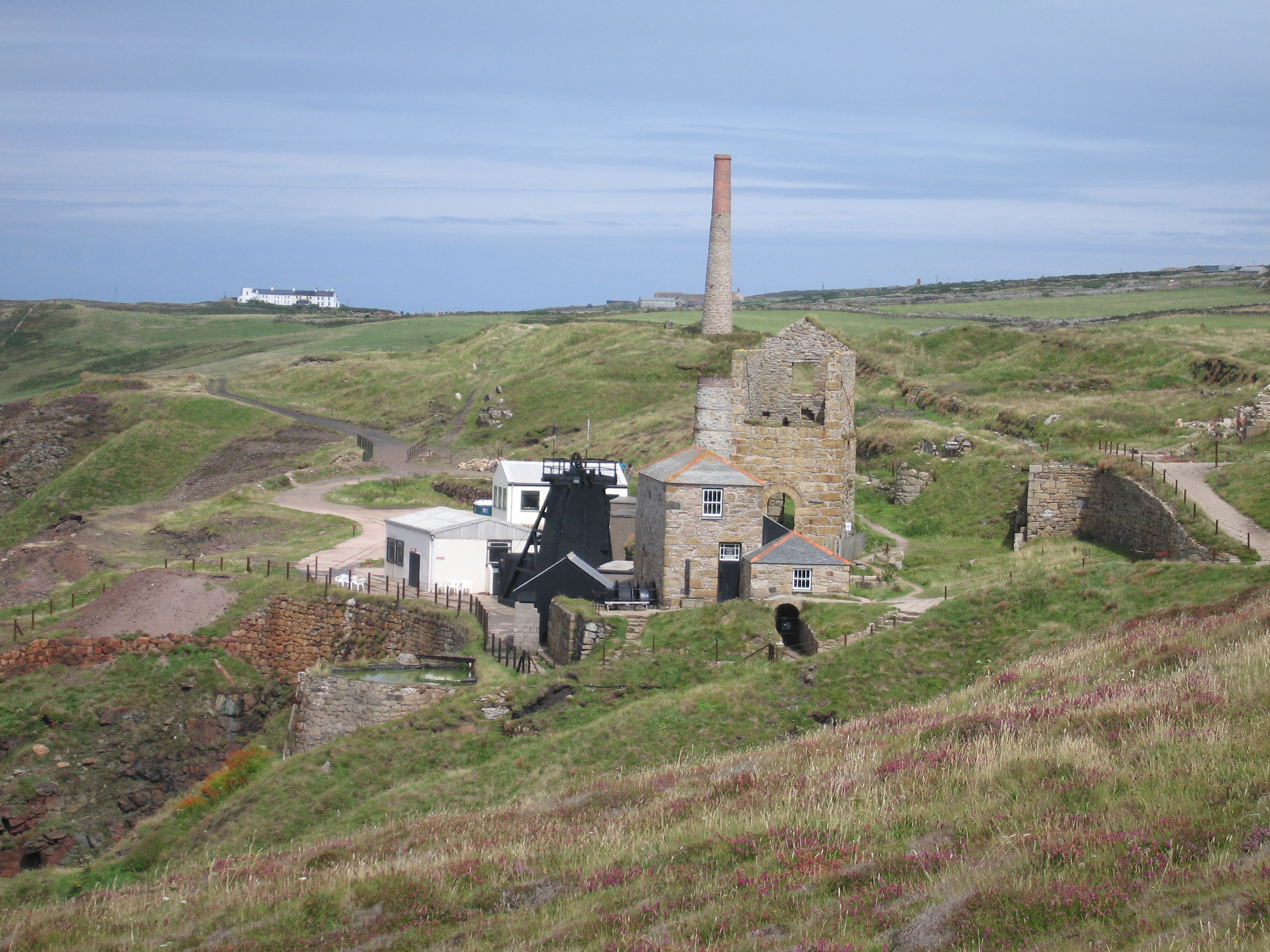
Levant mine: Beam winding engine, pump engine house and headgear. See map.

The property is on the site of the former Levant Mine, established in 1820 and closed in 1930, where tin and copper ores were raised. The mine reached a depth of about 600 metres. It got the nickname "mine under the sea", because tunnels were driven up to 2.5 km from the cliffs under the sea. The surviving beam engine was built c. 1840 by Harvey's of Hayle.

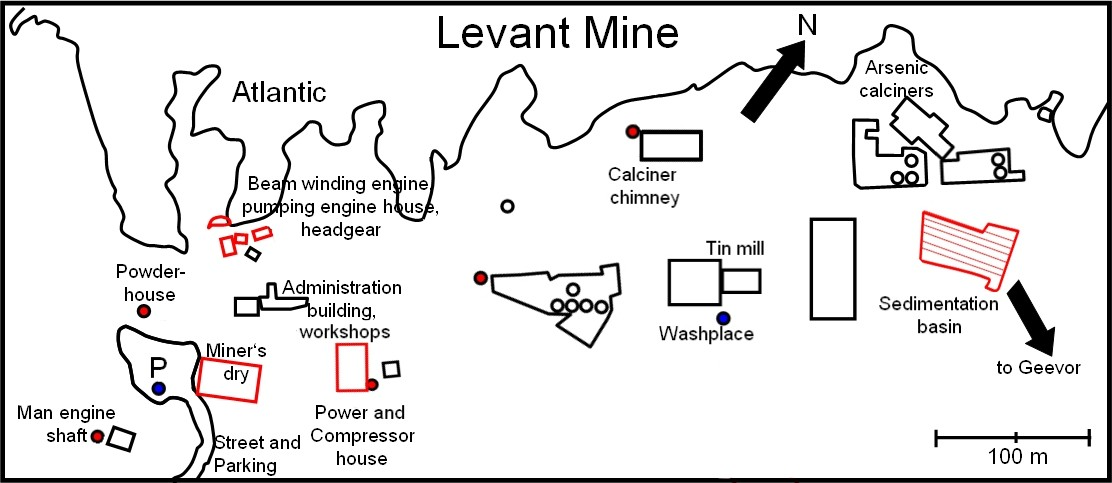
Overview sketch of the buildings and ruins of the Levant Mine (buildings and ruins still existing shown in red)

== History ==
The mine yields both copper and tin and was opened in 1820 with twenty shares of £20 each. From first opening, to circa 1883, the mine gave a profit of £171,000 from approximately £1,300,000 worth of ore. In 1882 the mine was taken over by new owners on a 21 year lease, who replaced machinery and improved the surface-works.

In 1883 three shafts were open. One shaft is occupied by the man-engine, a second by a pumping-engine and the third for hauling out the skips. Since the introductions of skips, for bringing ore to the surface, two shafts were abandoned. There were six engines on site,

1. pumping-engine, 45 inches (1,100 mm) cylinder – pumps water from the mine
2. stamping, 30 inches (760 mm) cylinder – breaks up the ore
3. winding-engine or whim, 26 inches (660 mm) cylinder – raises the ore to the surface
4. man-engine, 24 inches (610 mm) cylinder
5. crushing-machine, 18 inches (460 mm) cylinder
6. winding-engine, 14 inches (360 mm) cylinder.

A description of the working conditions of the mine was described in The Cornishman newspaper in 1883. Around 366 men, boys, and girls were employed compared with about 600 prior to 1882. The mine was worked in three, eight-hour shifts, (except on Sunday) with fifty to sixty men working underground in each shift. Access to the underground levels (i.e. passages) was by ladder and the temperature was around 92 °F (33 °C). The men were all more or less working in a nude state and sweating profusely. They were provided with spring water which was stored in huge canteens. Few are able to work underground after the age of 35. The width of the levels are 7 feet (2.1 m) high and 3–4 feet (0.91–1.22 m) wide, while the width of the lode is from 6 inches (150 mm) to 3 feet (0.91 m) wide. Thus a quantity of hard rock on each side of the lode has to be cut away at great expense. The levels are expanded by explosives. First a hole is made by hand-drill 20 inches (510 mm) deep, taking about two hours and the hole is charged with gunpowder. Premature ignition causes many injuries and fatalities. A 14 inches (360 mm) cylinder engine raised the ore to the surface in skips on two parallel inclines, one ascending as the other was lowered.

=== 1919 disaster ===
On 20 October 1919 an accident killed 31 miners, when a metal bracket at the top of a rod broke on the man engine. To use the man engine, the miners stepped on to a ladder, were transported 12 feet (3.7 m) up or down, climbed off onto a sollar, waited for the ladder to reset its position, then stepped back on to the ladder, repeating the process. The rod broke in several pieces and heavy timbers crashed down the shaft. A large scale rescue operation was able to save some of the miners. The engine was not replaced and the lower levels of the mine were abandoned.

== Minerals and ores ==
- silver
- bismuth
- calcspar
- aragonite
- vitreous copper ore or grey sulphuret of copper

== Mineral Statistics ==
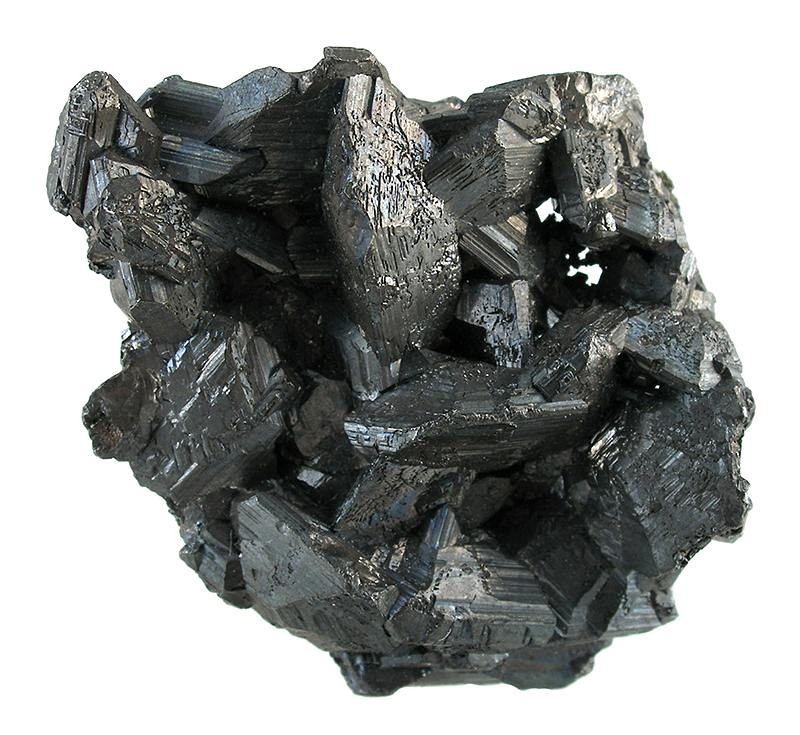
Chalcocite from Levant mine. A fine specimen of high-grade copper ore.

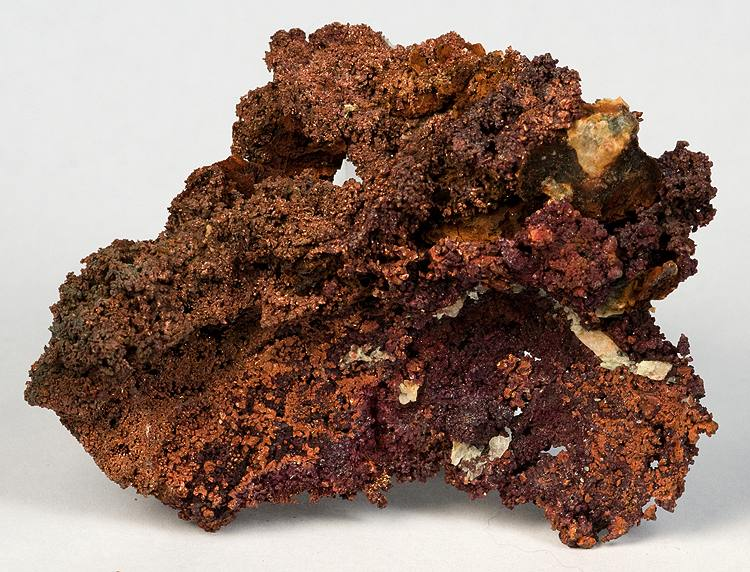
Cuprite and native copper from the Levant mine. Historic specimen.

From Robert Hunt's Mineral Statistics of the United Kingdom.

Copper Production (1845-1927)
Year(s)	Ore (Tons)	Metal (Tons)	Value (£)
1845	1,088.00	106.60	7,154.90
1846	1,293.00	130.30	8,199.90
1847	851.00	98.80	6,849.10
1848	1,776.00	177.60	9,857.20
1849	1,904.00	170.90	10,972.70
1850	2,668.00	217.10	14,156.80
1851	1,539.00	118.10	7,350.30
1852	1,333.00	101.60	7,993.20
1853	1,627.00	91.30	8,141.30
1854	1,589.00	87.70	8,201.20
1855	1,578.00	94.90	9,060.80
1856	1,641.00	94.00	7,859.40
1857	1,587.00	81.60	7,446.10
1858	1,473.00	96.80	8,267.30
1859	1,567.00	90.30	7,940.10
1860	957.00	57.20	5,126.00
1861	967.00	61.80	5,260.70
1862	1,069.00	71.30	5,508.10
1863	1,203.00	85.20	6,252.50
1864	839.00	53.60	4,235.70
1865	609.00	42.20	3,112.40
1866	349.00	25.60	1,543.10
1867	376.00	37.20	2,493.00
1868	380.00	34.70	2,278.20
1869	142.00	18.60	1,185.80
1870	100.00	16.20	1,029.90
1871	72.00	9.00	572.50
1873	74.00	8.00	518.90
1874	61.00	12.50	912.60
1875	123.00	18.40	1,411.80
1876	338.00	41.60	2,767.30
1877	419.80	52.40	2,897.10
1878	741.10	100.70	5,386.40
1879	385.60	45.20	2,312.10
1880	519.00	70.30	3,990.70
1881	1,002.40	123.90	6,949.60
1882	1,173.00	117.30	7,800.00
1883	1,477.70	155.00	7,357.00
1884	1,637.00	..	8,014.00
1885	1,364.00	..	6,073.00
1886	634.00	..	3,419.00
1887	727.00	..	3,698.00
1888	1,209.00	..	14,187.00
1889	1,505.00	..	7,293.00
1890	1,979.00	..	6,798.00
1891	2,189.00	..	5,994.00
1892	1,719.00	..	3,788.00
1893	1,230.00	..	3,441.00
1894	1,882.00	..	7,577.00
1895	4,333.00	..	15,730.00
1896	4,897.00	..	16,299.00
1897	3,455.00	..	11,009.00
1898	2,981.00	..	12,057.00
1899	3,627.00	..	17,827.00
1900	5,064.00	..	22,097.00
1901	3,550.00	..	17,430.00
1902	3,056.00	..	10,540.00
1903	3,381.00	..	10,961.00
1904	2,884.00	..	8,440.00
1905	3,387.00	..	11,788.00
1906	2,140.00	..	8,819.00
1907	1,962.00	..	9,007.00
1908	807.00	..	4,215.00
1909	1,202.00	..	3,737.00
1910	683.00	..	2,049.00
1911	900.00	..	3,062.00
1912	510.00	..	5,004.00
1913	383.00	..	3,303.00
1914	403.00	..	1,948.00
1915	164.00	..	1,283.00
1916	125.00	..	1,475.00
1916	155.00	..	2,466.00
1917	125.00	..	1,525.00
1917	146.00	..	2,529.00
1918	41.00	..	513.00
1918	54.00	..	1,782.00
1922	96.00	..	..
1923	4.90	..	..
1924	13.00	..	..
1925	9.00	..	..
1926	9.00	..	..
1927	4.60	..	.

Tin Production (1852-1970)
Year(s)	Black (Tons)	Stuff (Tons)	Tin (Tons)	Value (£)
1852	57.50	..	..	..
1853	41.00	..	..	2,861.50
1854	287.40	..	..	19,540.00
1855	310.00	..	..	20,099.70
1856	218.40	..	..	15,659.80
1857	192.20	..	..	15,161.90
1858	151.30	..	..	9,587.20
1859	210.50	..	..	15,479.50
1860	227.30	..	..	18,138.60
1861	178.50	..	..	13,404.10
1862	241.30	..	..	15,906.60
1863	170.30	..	..	11,178.30
1864	184.00	..	..	11,920.80
1865	183.30	..	..	9,913.90
1866	94.90	..	..	9,657.70
1867	187.10	..	..	9,916.90
1868	134.90	..	..	7,434.00
1869	174.10	..	..	12,073.30
1870	138.80	..	..	9,914.10
1871	86.30	..	..	6,368.80
1872	6.80	..	..	456.60
1873	83.90	..	..	6,154.80
1874	150.10	..	..	8,024.20
1875	195.60	..	..	9,592.90
1876	247.80	..	..	10,518.00
1877	260.10	..	..	10,569.50
1878	233.20	..	..	8,323.60
1879	273.60	..	..	10,944.00
1880	227.40	..	..	11,452.50
1881	232.60	..	158.50	12,603.60
1882	230.20	..	196.70	13,475.00
1883	283.10	..	..	14,984.00
1884	316.70	..	..	14,498.00
1885	452.20	..	..	21,664.00
1886	456.40	..	..	25,244.00
1887	492.40	..	..	30,598.00
1888	436.90	..	..	28,182.00
1889	451.20	..	..	24,769.00
1890	475.00	..	..	26,730.00
1891	578.40	..	..	31,436.00
1892	498.80	..	..	27,265.00
1893	665.00	..	..	33,775.00
1894	628.90	..	..	26,109.00
1895	517.30	..	..	19,630.00
1896	421.50	..	..	16,201.00
1897	571.80	..	..	23,162.00
1898	556.00	..	..	24,428.00
1899	551.40	..	..	38,940.00
1900	464.00	..	..	37,852.00
1901	514.20	..	..	37,075.00
1902	573.20	..	..	43,726.00
1903	561.80	..	..	43,925.00
1904	540.40	..	..	43,005.00
1905	528.50	..	..	46,450.00
1906	456.90	..	..	49,031.00
1907	338.80	..	..	37,044.00
1908	361.60	..	..	28,670.00
1909	422.00	..	..	33,857.00
1910	370.00	..	..	33,490.00
1911	431.00	..	..	49,035.00
1912	363.30	..	..	46,593.00
1913	381.00	..	..	45,583.00
1914	447.00	..	..	36,912.00
1914	119.00	9,053.00	..	..
1915	462.00	..	..	40,854.00
1915	411.00	26,380.00	..	..
1916	437.00	..	..	44,374.00
1916	437.00	..	..	46,298.00
1917	372.00	..	..	48,142.00
1917	372.00	..	..	48,500.00
1918	278.00	..	..	53,828.00
1918	278.00	..	..	55,171.00
1919	313.00	15,355.00	..	..
1922	176.75	8,590.00	..	..
1923	278.00	19,360.00	..	..
1924	454.00	37,130.00	..	..
1925	396.00	39,642.00	..	..
1926	295.00	35,582.00	..	..
1927	357.00	35,310.00	..	..
1928	414.00	29,292.00	..	..
1929-1931	no-details	..	..	..
1962	no-details	..	..	..
1966-1970	no-details	..	..	..

Arsenic Production (1881-1927)
Year(s)	Ore (Tons)	Value (£)
1881	20.00	50.00
1882	20.00	80.00
1883	11.30	43.00
1884	110.00	467.00
1885	207.80	861.00
1886	142.80	625.00
1887	144.00	773.00
1888	146.00	762.00
1889	173.00	935.00
1890	75.00	553.00
1891	186.00	1,267.00
1892	246.00	1,143.00
1893	189.00	1,083.00
1894	192.00	1,243.00
1895	216.00	1,299.00
1896	250.00	1,609.00
1897	231.00	2,019.00
1898	132.00	434.00
1899	200.00	912.00
1900	216.00	1,579.00
1904	105.00	368.00
1905	650.00	1,787.00
1906	234.00	2,267.00
1907	196.00	4,222.00
1908	106.00	512.00
1909	100.00	569.00
1910	99.00	586.00
1911	163.00	522.00
1912	168.80	563.00
1913	122.00	555.00
1914	58.00	213.00
1916	197.00	1,681.00
1916	202.00	1,162.00
1917	86.00	2,351.00
1917	86.00	2,786.00
1918	52.00	2,938.00
1918	52.00	3,184.00
1922	11.00	..
1923	15.00	..
1924	94.00	..
1925	40.00	..
1926	30.00	..
1927	10.00	..

Employment (1878-1931)
Year(s)	Total	Overground	Underground
1878	294	102	192
1879	279	87	192
1880	299	94	205
1881	308	96	212
1882	326	105	221
1883	362	116	246
1884	358	114	244
1885	406	127	279
1886	430	134	296
1887	448	133	315
1888	505	150	355
1889	509	159	350
1890	513	159	354
1891	519	154	365
1892	489	157	332
1893	501	162	339
1894	562	179	383
1895	604	192	412
1896	602	201	401
1897	609	202	407
1898	607	198	409
1899	630	203	427
1900	692	213	479
1901	724	226	498
1902	710	201	509
1903	685	201	484
1904	679	200	479
1905	634	199	435
1906	547	188	359
1907	501	181	320
1908	523	171	352
1909	494	172	322
1910	457	165	292
1911	476	171	305
1912	474	172	302
1913	439	167	272
1914	410	164	246
1915	386	164	222
1916	377	161	216
1917	365	156	209
1918	312	136	176
1918	312	136	176
1919	331	144	187
1919	331	144	187
1920	326	150	176
1921	76	66	10
1922	118	67	51
1923	191	97	94
1924	232	105	127
1925	276	114	162
1926	257	108	149
1927	255	108	147
1928	192	99	93
1929	198	93	105
1930	158	75	83
1931	2	2	..

== See also ==
- Man engine for an account of the accident in the mine on 20 October 1919.
- Geevor Tin Mine, just to the northeast of the Levant complex.
- South Crofty
- Wheal Jane
- Consolidated Mines
- Devon Great Consols
- Botallack Mine also known as Crown Mine
