= A3071 road =

Road in Cornwall

A3071

Route information
- Length: 6.2 mi (10.0 km)

Major junctions
- West end: St. Just
- A30
- East end: A30 at Penzance

Location
- Country: United Kingdom
- Constituent country: England
- Primary destinations: St. Just, Newbridge, Tremethick Cross and Penzance

Road network
- Roads in the United Kingdom; Motorways; A and B road zones

The A3071 is a minor 'A' road in the English county of Cornwall, which links St Just to Penzance and the A30. It is 6.2 miles long.

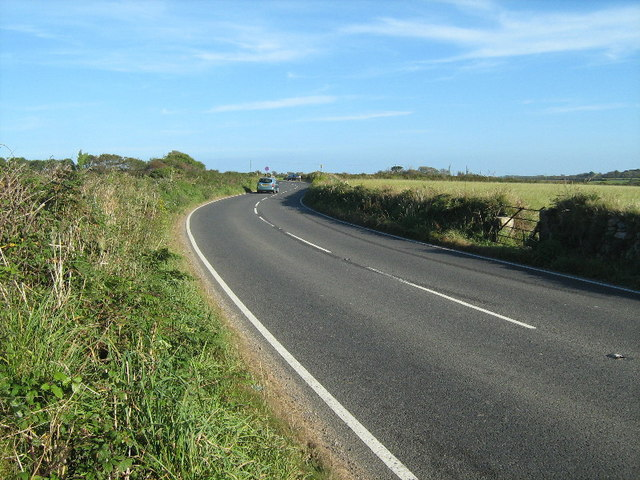
The A3071 near Tremayne farm

== History ==
In the early 19th-century, mines in the parish of St Just were flourishing but there were no natural harbours along the north coast. Mule trains, packhorses or wagons with four horses carried copper and tin to the harbour at the stannary town of Penzance. The wagons often grounded at the ford in the village of Hallen Tachen and a report in The West Briton newspaper on 26 May 1843 indicated that a bridge was to be built by Mr Edward Harvey of Penzance. The bridge was funded by the mining industry and Nicholas Holman who had transferred his foundry from Copperhouse, Hayle to Tregeseal in 1834. The two-span grade II listed bridge was a rebuild of an older bridge, from which the parapets and terminal refuges survive. The bridge is built of granite ashlar with granite dressings except for the rubble walls of the older bridge. The wider span is over the stream and a narrow span over the leat to Roskennals Mill. There is an inscription of "EH" on the north side and "1843" on the southern side. The village of Hallen Tachen is now known as Newbridge.

=== Turnpike ===
In 1863 the Penwith Turnpike Trust (later the Penzance and St Just Turnpike Trust) was formed. The road was the link between the mining region along the coast from St Just to Pendeen and carried heavy mining traffic to the harbour at the stannary town of Penzance. The Turnpike included two branches,

- the current B3318 which leaves the A3071 at Deveral Common and crosses Boscaswell Higher Downs. On Woon Gumpas Common the road splits with one branch reaching the north coast road at Trewellard and the other at Portheras Cross. Before the turnpike the original road left the A3071 at Higher Tregerest, taking a steeper route over Dry Carn Hill.
- a road now known as Turnpike Road or New Road, leaving the A3071 at a road junction (grid reference SW381309) to Sancreed, serving the foundry at Nancherrow.

The turnpike provided an easier route for the teams of four horses and wagons which had replaced pack mules. A toll was charged to use the road, which was let by yearly auction. Before the turnpike was formed the mines of St Just were doing well and it was estimated that moderate tolls would raise £800 annually. The Turnpike Act was to last 21 years from 1863 and loans of £6,300 were advanced, including £1750 and £1,250 from the Bolitho and, Batten, Carne and Carne banks, respectively, with the rest from bondholders. The tolls were let for £1000. In the late 1860s there was less traffic as mines closed, miners emigrated, and the tolls collected dropped to £500 annually. The bond-holders did not receive any interest for a number of years around 1870 and due to falling revenue the St Just end of the road was not completed. Despite the original estimate of an income of £800 per annum, in 1882, for example, the winning bid for running the turnpike was £550. There was a continuation Act in 1884 and the Turnpike Trust finally closed in November 1885.

The Toll House at Tremethick Cross was put up for auction on 9 June 1886 and withdrawn by the owner Mr T S Bolitho when the £98 reserve was not reached; the top bid was £40.

=== Milestones ===
A number of milestones and guide stones mark the route, some still surviving in their original position. They are of two designs, the earlier ones which predate the Turnpike Trust have arched tops and the ones erected by the trust have pyramidal tops. Some are listed,

A3071

Miles to Penzance	Photograph	Date	Description	Grade (if listed)
1	–		At grid reference SW45662997.	
2	–		At grid reference SW44023064.	
3	–		A rectangular granite stone 1 metre high with a truncated rectangular pyramid top, to the west of Tremayne Farm. The painted black inscription is "3", in a square recessed panel. (First listed on 9 July 2012 at grid reference SW4268631582).	II
	–	Early 19th century	An early 19th century (probably 1819) guidepost the junction to an earlier road to Pendeen. It is a dressed granite monolith with a pyrimidal head and incised inscriptions at the front and rear. The front inscription reads "SAINT" over a hand pointer "JUST ROAD and MORVAH" and the rear inscription reads "SAINT JUST TOWN 18-". (First listed on 15 December 1988 at grid reference SW4268631582).	II
	–	Early 19th century	Early 19th century guide post with incised inscriptions, with hand-pointers over the left-handed inscription "St Just GP". There is an Ordnance Survey bench mark under the right-handed inscription "Pendeen". Originally at (grid reference SW408318) and now at the current junction. (First listed on 15 December 1988 at grid reference SW4060531755).	II
5	–	Early 19th century	Early 19th century painted milestone, to the east of the former china clay works. The granite stone has a three-sided head and the Arabic numeral "5" in relief in a rectangular panel. (First listed on 15 December 1988 at grid reference SW3972832668).	II
5	–		An early granite milestone, which predates the turnpike and is in its original position just to the east of the former china clay works. The stone is just over 1 m high, rectangular in plan with a rounded top and has black painted lettering. The inscription on the north face is "FROM PENZ 5". (First listed on 30 July 2012 at grid reference SW3953331139).	II
	–	1833	1833 granite stone at the junction of Turnpike Road and the road to Sancreed, with the following inscriptions on two sides. "To Sancreed Church Town and Paul" and "Penzance Direct Road AD1833". (First listed on 19 March 1979, at grid reference SW3812430987).	II
6			Small, painted granite guide stone with an arched head approximately 100m west of the road to Sancreed. The inscription reads "From Penz. 6." (First listed on 19 March 1979, at grid reference SW3799830954).	II
6½	–	1836	Painted granite stone with round-headed sides, at the junction with the B3306 to Land's End Airport and the A30, near Crows-an-Wra. There are carved pointed hands in oval panels and the incised lettering below is, "To Penzance 6 1/2 miles. AD1836" and "To St Buryan 5 miles, To Lands End 6 miles". (First listed on 19 March 1979, at grid reference SW3743930989).	II
