= Boscaswell =

Village in west Cornwall, England

Coordinates: 50°09′N 5°40′W

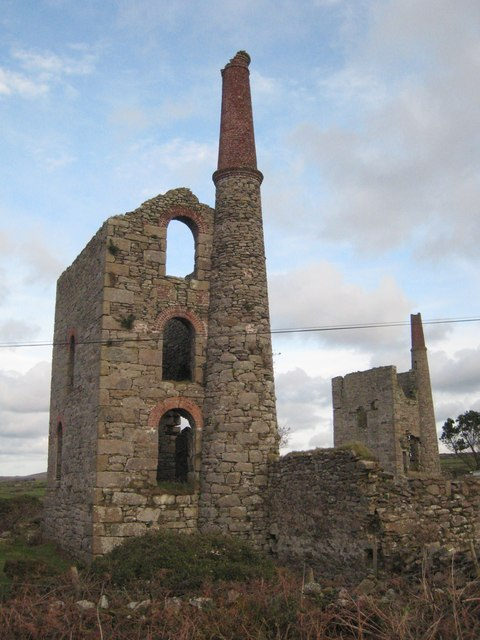
Engine houses at Wheal Hearle, East Boscaswell Mine

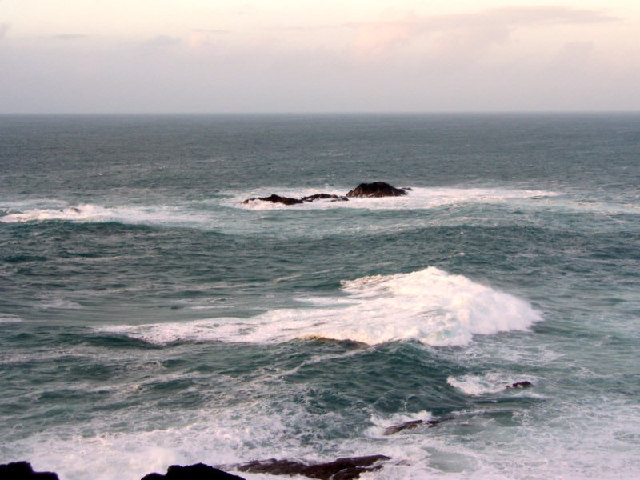
Three Stone Oar

Boscaswell (Cornish: Boscaswal) is a village in the extreme west of Cornwall, England, UK. It lies towards the cliffs from Pendeen, looking west across fields to the Atlantic Ocean. Boscaswell lies within the St Just in Penwith division of Cornwall Council. The village consists mainly of terraced cottages, built of granite, and a council house estate. Many of the cottages would once have housed families whose menfolk worked at the Geevor Tin Mine. Higher Boscaswell is a hamlet south-east of Pendeen.

== Toponymy ==
"Boscaswell" should not be confused with the present-day village of Boscastle, further east on the north Cornwall coast. F. J. Horsefield posited that what is now Boscaswell was once the site of another Danish castle. This is not now thought to be true.

Recent archaeological excavations at the lower end of Boscaswell have indicated that the land has been occupied for more than 10,000 years. There is an ancient pagan well in Boscaswell which is where the name is thought to have its origins. The name can be broken down to the place (bos) of Cas' (a person or entity or abbreviation thereof) and well (as in the English word). Another explanation is given by Craig Weatherhill in A Concise Dictionary of Cornish Place-Names, where he gives a 1310 version of the name, 'Boscaswal', and points out that 'bos' in Cornish means dwelling, esp. in place names, thus giving 'Cadwal's dwelling'.

== Mining ==
The mining sett of East Boscaswell Mine was sold by tender, either as a going or dead concern, in October 1882. Included was a 30-inch cylinder pumping engine and a 24-inch cylinder winding and stamping engine.
