= Lower Boscaswell =

Hamlet in Cornwall, England

Coordinates: 50°09′N 5°40′W

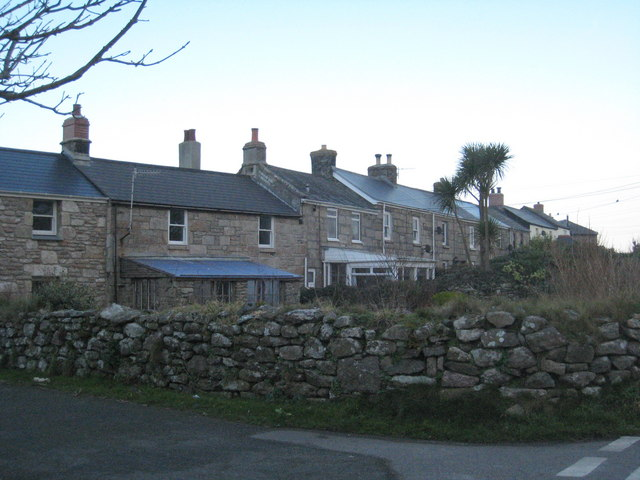
Miners' cottages at Lower Boscaswell

Lower Boscaswell is a hamlet near Pendeen in Cornwall, England.

Lower Boscaswell lies within the Cornwall Area of Outstanding Natural Beauty (AONB).
