= Overhill =

- Directed by: Will Hutchinson
- Written by: Leo Whetter
- Produced by: Holly Barringer
- Starring: Lorna Beckett; Merryn Owen
- Music by: Joe Lewis
- Release date: 2013
- Running time: 83 minutes
- Country: United Kingdom
- Language: English
- Budget: £600

Overhill is a 2013 British horror thriller film, directed by Will Hutchinson and starring Lorna Beckett. The story focuses on Londoner, Rebecca, who takes Overhill cottage in Pendeen as a quiet and secluded place to get her novel finished. She quickly finds that the locals know more about her than she anticipated, and peace is in short supply.

== Production ==
Set in the village of Pendeen in Cornwall, and largely shot over four days in 2011, featuring many local actors, it was completed for just £600.

== Release ==
The film had its worldwide premiere at the East End Film Festival on Thursday 27 June 2013, followed by a question-and-answer session with director Will Hutchinson, writer Leo Whetter and Guardian journalist David Stubbs.
