= St Just in Penwith (electoral division) =

Former electoral division of Cornwall in the UK

- Former ward Cornwall Council
- Boundary of St Just in Penwith in from 2013-2021.
- County: Cornwall

2013–2021
- Number of councillors: One
- Replaced by: Land's End
- Created from: St Just in Penwith

2009–2013
- Number of councillors: One
- Replaced by: St Just in Penwith
- Created from: Council created

St Just in Penwith (Cornish: Lannust) was an electoral division of Cornwall in the United Kingdom which returned one member to sit on Cornwall Council between 2009 and 2021. It was abolished at the 2021 local elections, being succeeded by the Land's End division.

== Councillors ==
Election	Member	Party
2009	Chris Goninan	Independent
2013	Sue James	Liberal Democrat
2017	Sue James	Liberal Democrat
2021	Seat abolished	

== Extent ==
The division represented the town of St Just, the villages of Pendeen, Boscaswell, Trewellard, and Botallack as well as the hamlets of Carnyorth, Higher Boscaswell, Tregeseal and Kelynack. The division also included Land's End Airport.

The division was nominally abolished during boundary changes at the 2013 election. From 2009 to 2013, the division covered 3103 hectares in total; after the boundary changes in 2013, it covered 3093 hectares.

== Election results ==
=== 2017 election ===
2017 election: St Just in Penwith
Party	Candidate	Votes	%	±%
Liberal Democrats	Sue James	1,184	59.0	▲22.5
Conservative	Kevin McFadden	579	28.8	▲22.1
Labour	Louise Paine	229	11.4	▼4.6
Majority		605	30.1	▲14.7
Rejected ballots		15	0.7	▲0.4
Turnout		2007	52.9	▲11.6
Liberal Democrats hold		Swing		

=== 2013 election ===
2013 election: St Just in Penwith
Party	Candidate	Votes	%	±%
Liberal Democrats	Sue James	574	36.5	▲4.1
Independent	Kevin McFadden	332	21.1	New
UKIP	Adrian Smith	304	19.4	New
Labour	Kirsty Pritchard	251	16.0	New
Conservative	David Lenaghan	106	6.7	▼3.6
Majority		242	15.4	N/A
Rejected ballots		4	0.3	▼1.6
Turnout		1571	41.3	Steady
Liberal Democrats gain from Independent		Swing		

=== 2009 election ===
2009 election: St Just in Penwith
Party	Candidate	Votes	%	±%
Independent	Chris Goninan	790	50.4	
Liberal Democrats	Sandy Angove	507	32.4	
Conservative	Ken Messenger	161	10.3	
Independent	Peter Beech	80	5.1	
Majority		283	18.1	
Rejected ballots		29	1.9	
Turnout		1567	41.3	
Independent win (new seat)				
