= Bojewyan =

Coordinates: 50.15482°N 5.65053°W

Bojewyan: Cornish: Bosywyon
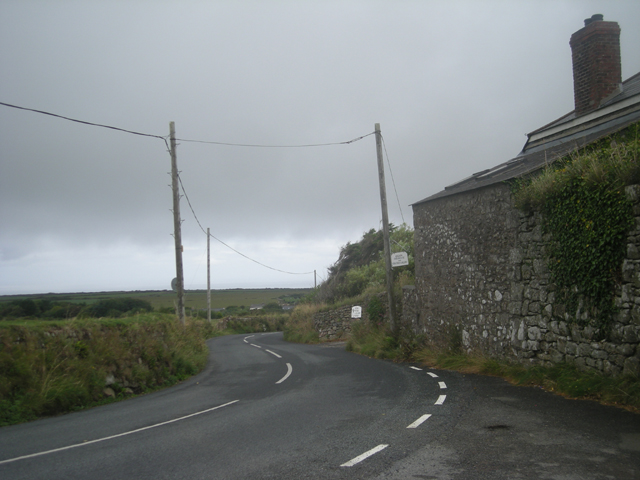
- The main road to St Ives

- Location within Cornwall
- OS grid reference: SW3934
- Shire county: Cornwall
- Region: South West
- Country: England
- Sovereign state: United Kingdom
- Post town: Penzance
- Postcode district: TR19
- Police: Devon and Cornwall
- Fire: Cornwall
- Ambulance: South Western

Bojewyan (Cornish: Bosywyon, meaning Dwelling of Ywyon) is a settlement on the Penwith Peninsula in west Cornwall, United Kingdom. The village lies along the B3306 road which runs along the north coast and connects St Ives to St Just. It is located between the villages of Pendeen and Morvah. The settlement once had a Wesleyan Chapel which was reopened in May 1879 after alterations and repairs.
