= Tremethick Cross =

Hamlet in Cornwall, England

Coordinates: 50.119°N 5.578°W

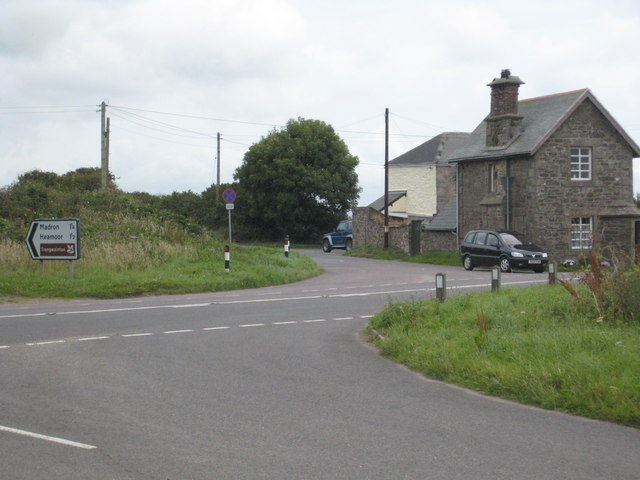
Junction on the A3071 showing the toll house

Tremethick Cross (from Cornish: Trenmedhek) is a hamlet around a crossroads in the parish of Madron, in west Cornwall, United Kingdom. Between 1863 and 1884, the A3071 road, was a turnpike serving the mining industry at St Just for the transport of ore to the nearest harbour in Penzance. A toll house, two miles west of Penzance, can still be seen on the crossroads.

Tremethick, Tremathick or Trereife cross is a stone Latin cross which was brought to this site from Rose-an-Beagle in the parish of Paul.
