= Higher Boscaswell =

Hamlet in Cornwall, England

Coordinates: 50.150°N 5.663°W

- Location within Cornwall
- OS grid reference: SW384342
- Unitary authority: Cornwall
- Ceremonial county: Cornwall
- Region: South West
- Country: England
- Sovereign state: United Kingdom
- Post town: Penzance
- Postcode district: TR19

Higher Boscaswell is a hamlet near Pendeen in west Cornwall, England. It is east of Pendeen and on the B road from St Ives to St Just. Higher Boscaswell is included in the St Just in Penwith division on Cornwall Council.
