= Sellan =

Coordinates: 50.11°N 5.61°W

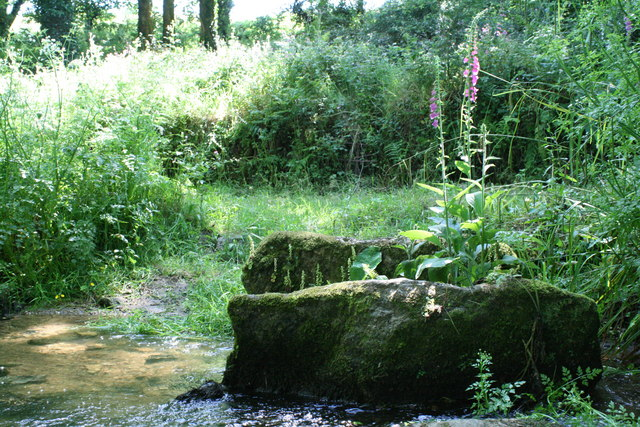
The stream south of Sellan

Sellan is a farm in west Cornwall, England, United Kingdom, not to be confused with the Beacon Estate (a part of Sancreed village). It lies just northeast of Sancreed.
