= Sperris Quoit =

Dolmen in the Cornwall region, England

- Location within Southwest Cornwall
- 50.190227°N 5.544605°W
- Type: Dolmen
- Location: near Zennor and St Ives

Site notes
- Elevation: 230 metres (750 ft)
- Condition: extremely ruined

Scheduled monument
- Official name: Portal dolmen called Sperris Quoit
- Designated: 23 March 1970
- Reference no.: 1004306

Sperris Quoit is a ruined megalithic burial chamber or dolmen, and one of a type of tomb unique to West Penwith, located on a moor around 365 metres northeast of Zennor Quoit, being roughly halfway between Zennor and Amalveor, Cornwall. It is the northernmost quoit in the Penwith peninsula and a Scheduled Monument.

== Etymology ==
The word "Sperris" is believed to have been derived from the identical Cornish word "sperris", which means hobgoblin, ghost, or sprite, whereas the word "Quoit" is believed to derive from the Old French word "coite", and means "a large flat stone atop a cromlech", or tomb.

== History ==
Sperris Quoit is over 4000 years old, and may be older, possibly as old as 7000 years, as it has been dated variously at late- or post-Neolithic, and late Mesolithic or Neolithic. It was in relatively good condition until at least the early 19th century, but there is evidence that stones have been removed since then, for local building work in the village of Zennor. The site was rediscovered in 1954 by Thomas and Wakes, who excavated it in part.

== Description ==
The quoit is situated in rough moorland on the side of Zennor Hill, at about 230 metres above sea level, and is close to several rocky outcrops. About 12 metres in diameter, five stones were found during the excavations, two standing, and three fallen, of which one has eroded to a stump, although due to heavy vegetation and dense gorse, only one upright of the chamber is visible, which is over 1.5 metres tall. It is surrounded on all sides by bracken, gorse, and thick vegetation. The capstone is missing entirely. A cremation pit was discovered during the excavations, and the antechamber faces south.

== See also ==
- Spolia
