= Carnyorth =

Hamlet in west Cornwall, England

Coordinates: 50.138°N 5.676°W

Carnyorth: Cornish: Karnyorgh
- Hamlet
- Location within Cornwall
- Unitary authority: Cornwall
- Region: South West
- Country: England
- Sovereign state: United Kingdom
- Police: Devon and Cornwall
- Fire: Cornwall
- Ambulance: South Western

Carnyorth (from Cornish: Karnyorgh, meaning crag of the roe deer) is a hamlet in west Cornwall, England, United Kingdom. It is approximately one mile (1.6 km) south of Pendeen and six miles (10 km) northwest of Penzance. It is in the civil parish of St Just in Penwith.

It lies along the B3306 road which connects St Ives to the A30 road near Land's End.

Carnyorth lies within the Cornwall Area of Outstanding Natural Beauty (AONB) and the electoral division of St Just in Penwith. Almost a third of Cornwall has AONB designation, with the same status and protection as a National Park.
