= Mayon, Cornwall =

Coordinates: 50.074°N 5.692°W

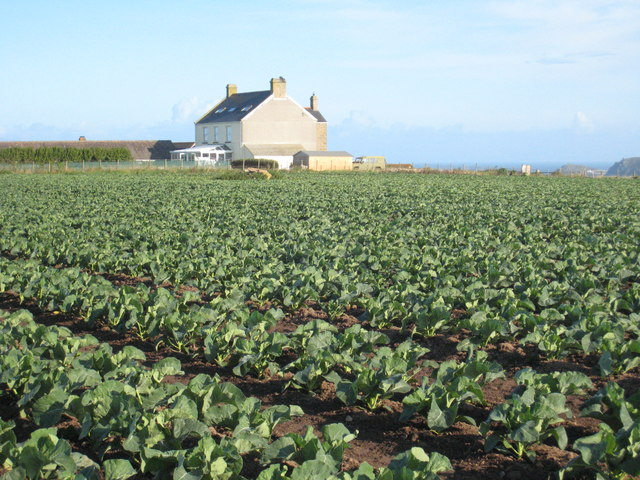
- A field of young cauliflowers at Mayon Farm

- Location within Cornwall
- OS grid reference: SW359258
- Unitary authority: Cornwall
- Ceremonial county: Cornwall
- Region: South West
- Country: England
- Sovereign state: United Kingdom
- Post town: Penzance
- Postcode district: TR19

Mayon is a hamlet on the A30 main road north of Sennen in west Cornwall, England. Mayon is about 7 miles (11 km) south-west of Penzance.

Much of the land in St Levan belonged to the manor of Mayon, and in the early 17th century the land was divided between six heiresses, one of whom married John St Aubyn.

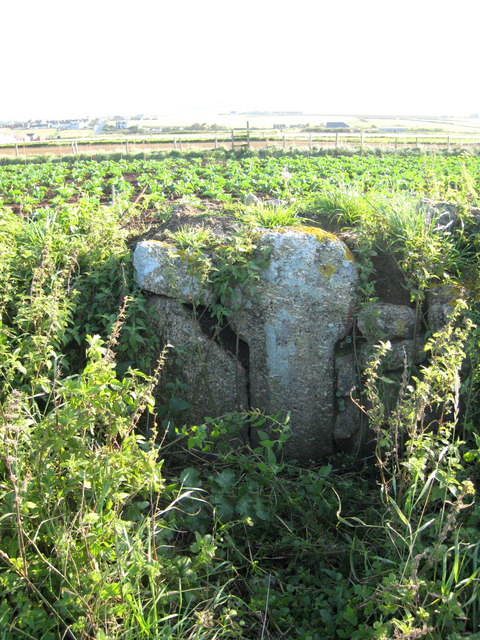
A cross at Mayon Farm
