= Trevescan =

Hamlet in Cornwall, UK

Coordinates: 50.064°N 5.695°W

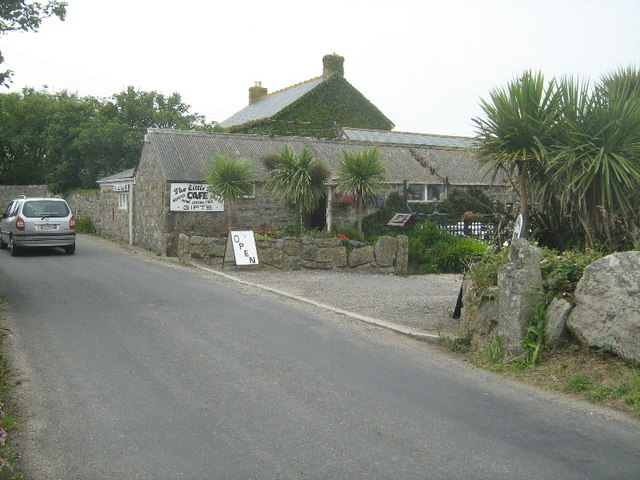
The Little Barn Café, Trevescan

Trevescan is a hamlet in west Cornwall, England, United Kingdom. It is situated between the village of Sennen and the settlement at Land's End, 8 miles (13 km) west of Penzance.

The name is Cornish and could mean tre (hamlet) + personal name Bescan which means "little short one", or could be a corruption of heskyn, ″sedge″ or ″marsh″. Previous spellings of the name include, Trefescan (1302), Trevescan (1310), Trevascan (1327) and Treviscan (1343).
