= Drift, Cornwall =

Village in west Cornwall, England

Coordinates: 50.10125°N 5.58265°W

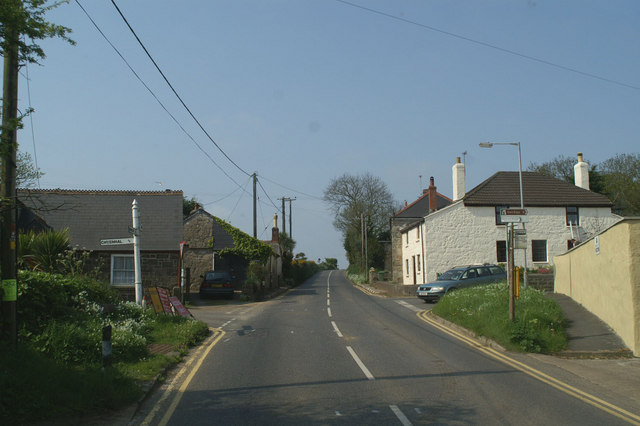
The A30 at Drift

Drift is a village on the A30 road in west Cornwall, England, United Kingdom. The village is in the civil parish of Sancreed and is approximately two miles (3 km) west of Penzance and six miles (9 km) from Land's End.

Nearby is a pair of standing megaliths called the 'Sisters' or 'Higher Drift Menhirs'. Drift Reservoir is immediately north of the village.

The local community radio station is Coast FM (formerly Penwith Radio), which broadcasts on 96.5 and 97.2 FM.
