= Newbridge, Cornwall =

Hamlet in west Cornwall, England

Coordinates: 50.12880°N 5.60552°W

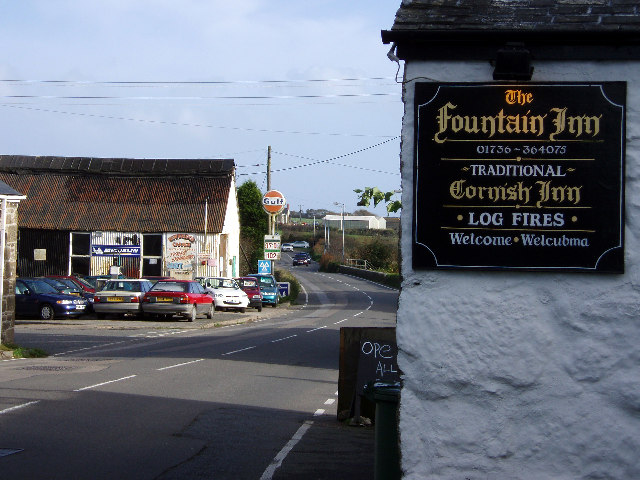

Newbridge (Cornish: Hal an Tegen) is a hamlet in the civil parish of Madron on the Penwith peninsula in west Cornwall, England, United Kingdom. It is on the A3071 road between St Just and Penzance, about three miles (5 km) west of the latter.

Newbridge Board School was opened by the School Board of Sancreed in 1875 and enlarged in 1882 for a further thirty to forty children.

It should not be confused with Newbridge in the civil parish of Kenwyn. There is also a bridge called Newbridge near Gunnislake.
