= Grumbla =

Hamlet in Cornwall, England

Coordinates: 50°06′42″N 5°38′15″W

Grumbla: Cornish: An Grommlegh
- Hamlet
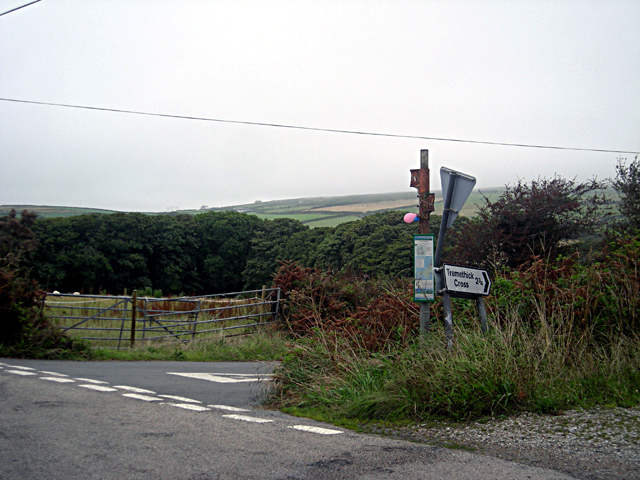

- Location within Cornwall
- Unitary authority: Cornwall
- Region: South West
- Country: England
- Sovereign state: United Kingdom
- Police: Devon and Cornwall
- Fire: Cornwall
- Ambulance: South Western

Grumbla (Cornish: An Grommlegh, meaning the cromlech) is a hamlet in the parish of Sancreed, Cornwall, England, UK.

== Toponymy ==
Recorded as Gromleigh in 1504, meaning cromlech or prehistoric tomb. Referred to as Grumbler in an advertisement on the front page of The Cornishman in 1880.

== Geography ==
The hamlet of Grumbla along with Higher Grumbla, Lower Grumbla and Grumbla Common is a small area within the parish of Sancreed, to the west of Sancreed Beacon. Grumbla lies within the Cornwall Area of Outstanding Natural Beauty.

== History ==
The remains of a possible prehistoric tomb, or cromlech, after which Grumbla is named, can be found at grid reference SW40492948. It consists of a circular earth bank lined with big stones, but its identification is uncertain and it could be the remains of a hut circle. There is slab of rock, 50 metres (160 ft) north of this (grid reference SW40492953), set on edge and apparently artificially erected, which could be the support of a dolmen, or the retaining circle of a barrow. Ramparts of the Iron Age hillfort of Caer Bran is 700 metres (2,300 ft) are to the south of the hamlet, and the Iron Age settlement of Carn Euny is about 900 metres (3,000 ft) to the south-west.

The leasehold tenement of "Little Grumbler" was put up for sale at the Bird-in-Hand Inn, Sancreed Churchtown on Friday, 14 May 1880. The tenement consisted of a dwellinghouse and approximately 6 acres 2 roods, 32 poles (about 2.5 ha) of arable and pasture land. It had previously been under an indenture of lease for an absolute term of 60 years commencing on 24 June 1845 and the yearly rent was £4 per annum. Captain T Trahair of St Just purchased the property for £1 more than the reserve price of £160.
