= Carn Towan =

Hamlet in west Cornwall, England

Coordinates: 50.081°N 5.690°W

Carn Towan: Cornish: Karn Tewyn
- Hamlet
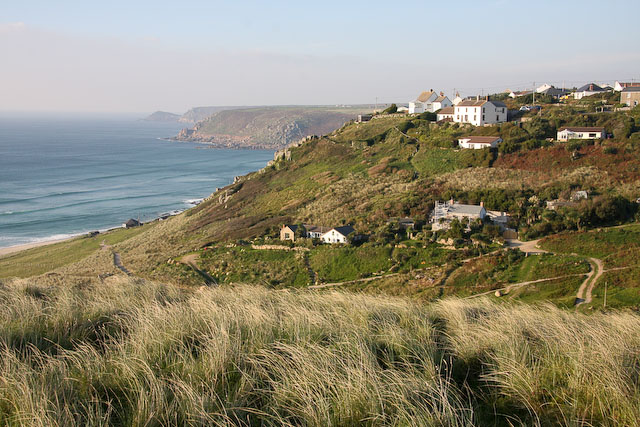

- Location within Cornwall
- Unitary authority: Cornwall
- Region: South West
- Country: England
- Sovereign state: United Kingdom
- Police: Devon and Cornwall
- Fire: Cornwall
- Ambulance: South Western

Carn Towan (Cornish: Karn Tewyn, meaning dune cairn) is a coastal hamlet northeast of Sennen Cove in west Cornwall, England, UK. Carn Towan is in the civil parish of Sennen.
