= Trewellard =

Village in Cornwall, England

Coordinates: 50.145°N 5.674°W

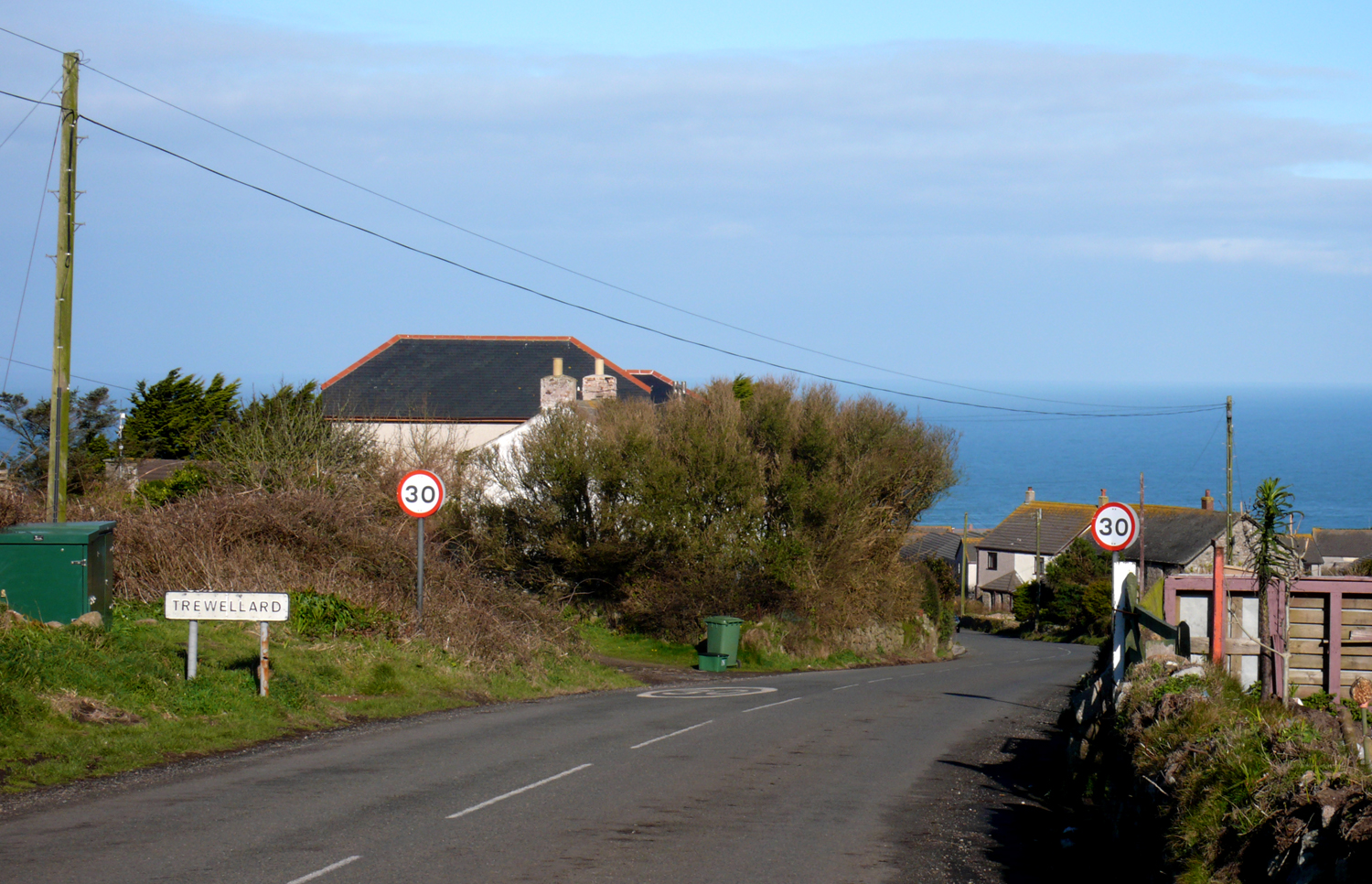
Trewellard Village, looking west along Trewellard Road

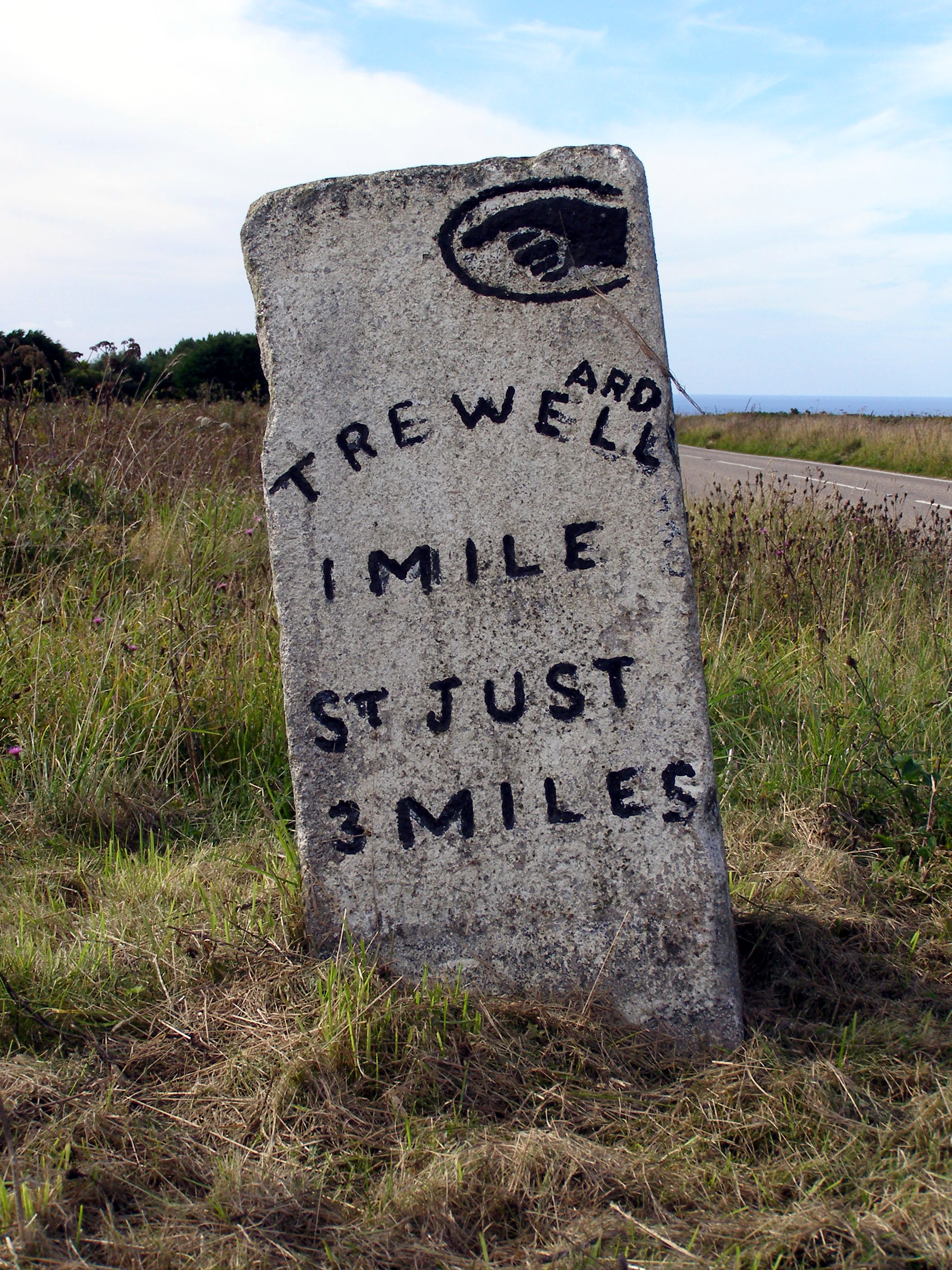
Milestone on the B3318 pointing towards Trewellard

Trewellard (Cornish: Trewyllard, meaning Gwyllard's settlement; grid reference SW376337) is a small village on the north coast road between St Just and St Ives in Cornwall, England, United Kingdom. It lies along the B3306 road which connects St Ives to the A30 road. It is situated 7 miles from Land's End and 7 miles from Penzance. It is in the civil parish of St Just and the electoral division of St Just in Penwith.

Trewellard lies within the Cornwall Area of Outstanding Natural Beauty (AONB). Almost a third of Cornwall has AONB designation, with the same status and protection as a National Park.

== History and geography ==
The village is in an area of outstanding natural beauty and a Site of Special Scientific Interest (SSSI) due to the ancient tin workings and the penultimate working tin mine in Cornwall, Geevor, that closed finally in 1990. Geevor is now a museum and forms part of the World Heritage Site of Cornwall and West Devon Mining Landscape. Down the lane from Trewellard is Levant Tin Mine which was the site of a terrible accident in 1919 where 31 men were killed. It has been long since closed and is owned by the National Trust which operates it as a museum.

== Cornish wrestling ==
Cornish wrestling tournaments, for prizes, were held at the cricket ground in Trewellard.

== Trewellard in recent times ==
The village has undergone some development in the last 20 years much of which is of late 20th century style and as such differs from the early granite dwellings in the village. In 2004 Penwith District Council designated the centre of the village as a Conservation area. This means that planning permission can be more difficult to obtain and has increased the value of land within the village. The Methodist Chapel finally closed in 2005 due to declining attendance and an ageing congregation. House prices are now higher than the national average (as at 2006). It currently boasts two restaurants (one a Meadery), a pub and a garage. There is also a small rural industrial estate.
