= Sennen =

Coordinates: 50.070°N 5.695°W

Sennen: Cornish: Sen Senan
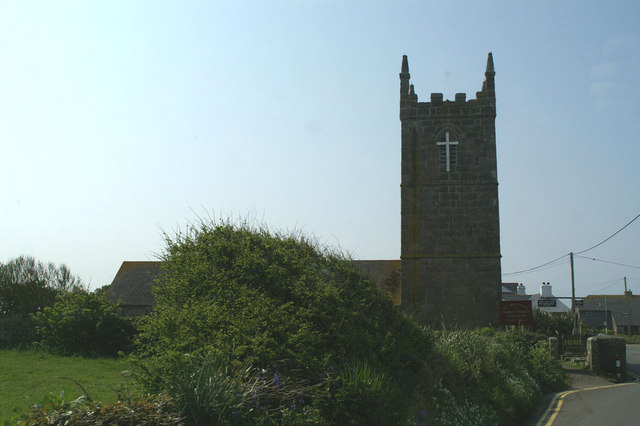
- Sennen parish church

- Location within Cornwall
- Interactive map of Sennen
- Population: 889 (2021)
- OS grid reference: SW358256
- Civil parish: Sennen
- Unitary authority: Cornwall
- Ceremonial county: Cornwall
- Region: South West
- Country: England
- Sovereign state: United Kingdom
- Post town: Penzance
- Postcode district: TR19
- Dialling code: 01736
- Police: Devon and Cornwall
- Fire: Cornwall
- Ambulance: South Western
- UK Parliament: St Ives

Sennen (Cornish: Sen Senan) is a coastal civil parish and a village in Cornwall, England, United Kingdom. Sennen village is situated approximately eight miles (13 km) west-southwest of Penzance.

Sennen parish is bounded by the sea to the west and bordered by the parishes of St Just to the north, St Buryan to the east, St Levan to the south. The main settlements are Churchtown, Trevescan, Carn Towan, Sennen Cove and Land's End. The population was 889 at the 2021 census.

For the purposes of local government Sennen elects a parish council every four years. The main local authority is Cornwall Council.

== Geography ==
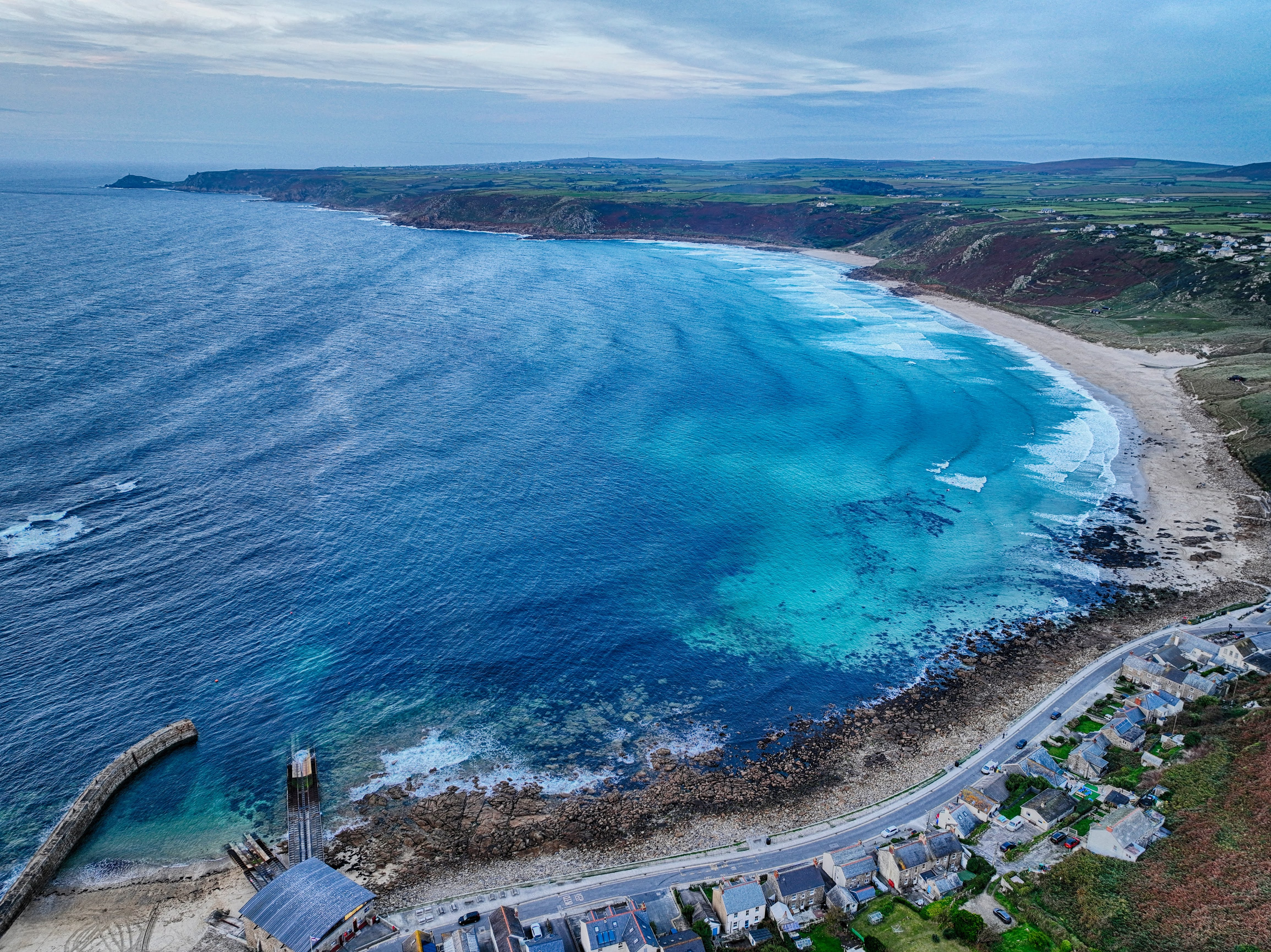
Aerial view of Sennen village and coastline, Cornwall, England.

Sennen parish is situated at the western tip of the Penwith peninsula and is exposed to prevailing westerly winds from the Atlantic. Geologically, it is located on the Land's End Granite, one of the five major granite batholiths that make up the spine of Cornwall (see Geology of Cornwall). Consequently, the parish has a bare moorland-like character with very few trees and no woodland.

The parish consists of 2,284 acres (9 km^{2}) of land, 6 acres (24,000 m^{2}) of water and 64 acres (260,000 m^{2}) of foreshore. It includes the Longships, a group of rocky islets situated off Lands End.

The church town, Sennen, is the most westerly village in mainland England and is 315 miles (507 km) west-southwest of London. Below the village is the harbour settlement of Sennen Cove.

== Demographics ==
Census population of Sennen parish
| Census | Population | Female | Male | Households | Source |
|---|---|---|---|---|---|
| 2001 | 829 | 424 | 405 | 361 | |
| 2011 | 921 | 469 | 452 | 394 | |
| 2021 | 889 | 448 | 441 | 386 | |

== Church ==
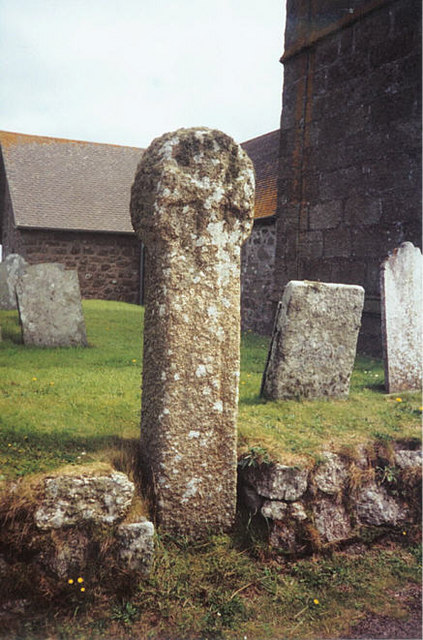
A Cornish cross in the cemetery

Sennen parish church is dedicated to St Sinninus but has also been dedicated to St John the Baptist. There has been a church here since at least the 15th century. A visit by members of the Penzance Natural History and Antiquarian Society on their annual excursion in August 1893 translated a Latin inscription on a stone at the base of the font as ″In the year of the Lord 1441 [2, 3, or 4], this Church was dedicated on [the festival of] the beheading of St John the Baptist″. The present church has a chancel and nave, a south aisle and a north transept. A wall-painting depicting two round embattled towers was uncovered during restoration in 1867. There is also a headless alabaster figure representing the Virgin Mary in the transept. The church has a three-stage battlemented tower housing a ring of three bells.

There are five Cornish crosses in the parish. One is at Escalls and another at Sennen Green. Trevilley cross is one of only two crosses with a crucifixus figure on a cross carved onto the stone (there is a cross on the other side of the head). A cross on the churchyard wall came from a site near the Giant's Stone. A fine cross in the cemetery adjoining the churchyard was found in use as a footbridge near Trevear and moved to the churchyard in 1878. About 1890 it was moved to its present position.

== Folklore traditions ==
On the old Christmas Day in the 1830s (and before) the farmers of St Sennen assembled for the festivities. One of the dishes was a pie made from 24 blackbirds. At midnight the young men went out to see the 'cattle kneel' and on their return they threw rushes onto the fire. The number of crackles, or the particular form assumed, told the fortunes of those who threw them into the fire.

Local magical practices were also reported. In the late nineteenth century, Sennen girls performed traditional love divinations on Twelfth Night involving ivy leaves, rushes, and a turf fire. These rituals were believed to predict future marriages and deaths. Additionally, a folk magician named Dionysious Williams, who lived in nearby Mayon, was reputed to have used counter-magic to trap a thief using enchanted furze. Another tale describes a Sennen man rescuing his housekeeper from malevolent spirits inadvertently summoned from a spellbook.

== Notable residents ==
- William John Hocking of the Royal Mint

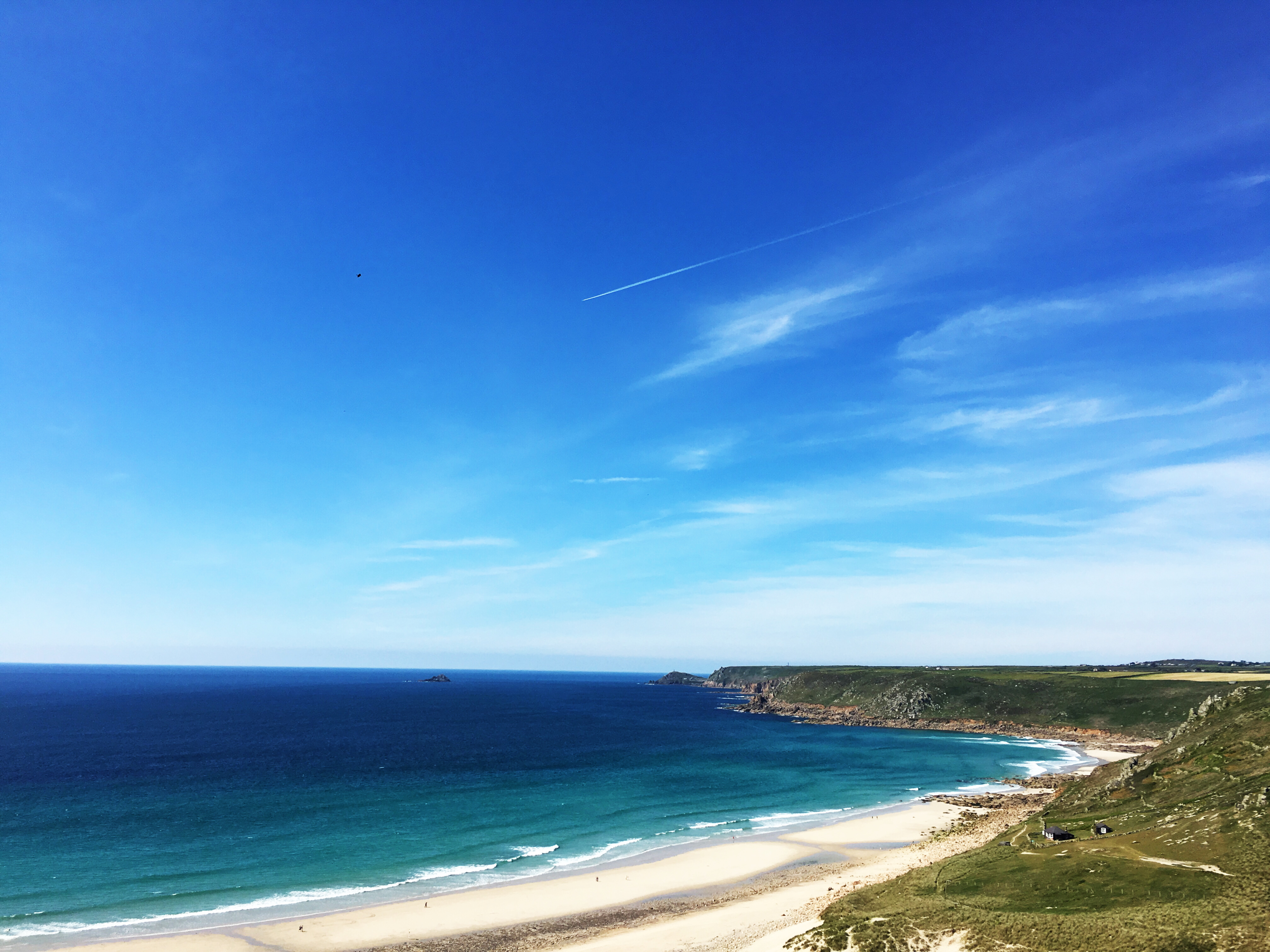
The beach at Sennen from Cove Road

== Gallery ==
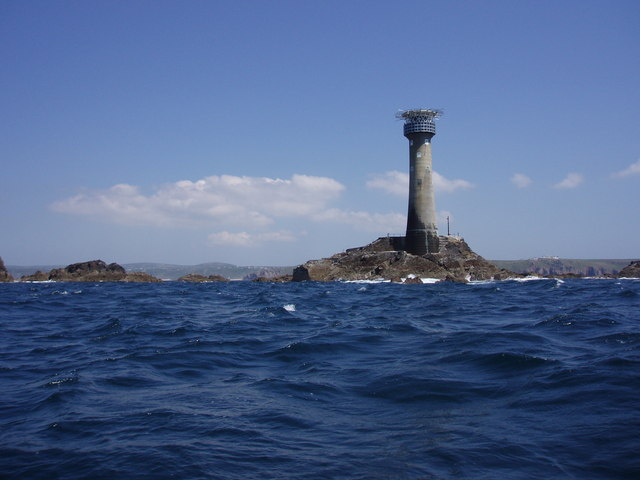
The Longships lighthouse and neighbouring islets are in Sennen parish

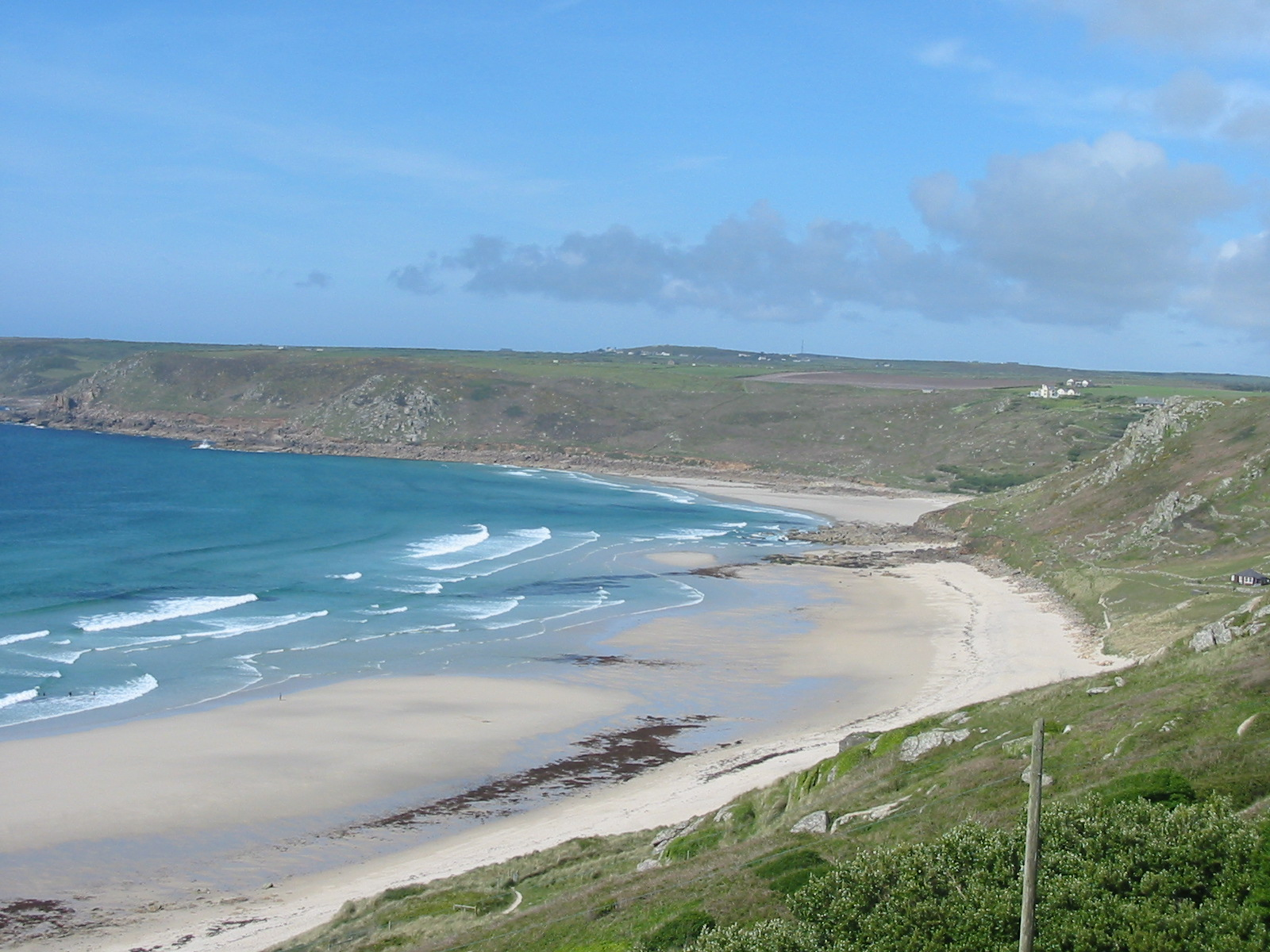
Whitesand Bay is in Sennen parish

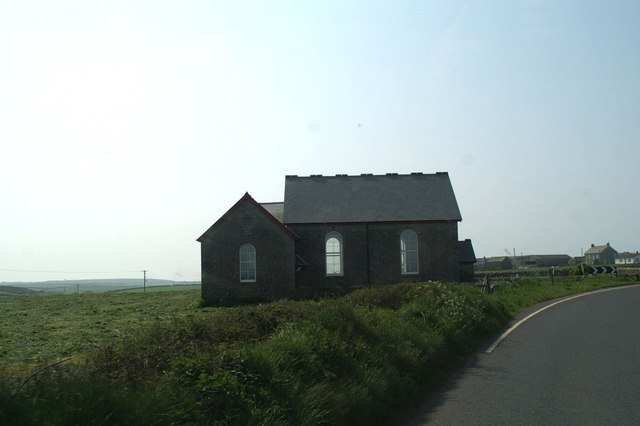
Sennen Methodist Chapel
