= Pendeen =

Village and parish in Cornwall, England

Coordinates: 50.1521°N 5.6618°W

Pendeen: Cornish: Boskaswal Wartha
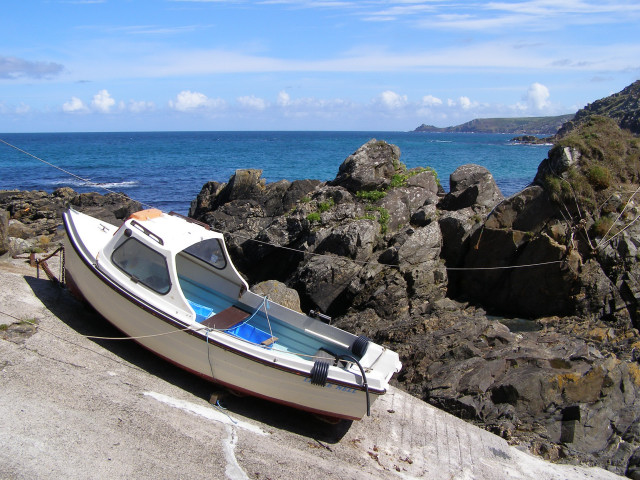
- Boat on the slipway at Pendeen Cove

- Location within Cornwall
- OS grid reference: SW384344
- Civil parish: St Just
- Unitary authority: Cornwall
- Ceremonial county: Cornwall
- Region: South West
- Country: England
- Sovereign state: United Kingdom
- Post town: PENZANCE
- Postcode district: TR19
- Dialling code: 01736
- Police: Devon and Cornwall
- Fire: Cornwall
- Ambulance: South Western
- UK Parliament: St Ives

Pendeen (from Cornish: Penn Din meaning "headland fort", previously known as Cornish: Boskaswal Wartha, meaning "Caswal's high dwelling") is a village and ecclesiastical parish on the Penwith peninsula in Cornwall, England. It is 3 miles (5 kilometres) north-northeast of St Just and 7 mi (11 km) west of Penzance. It lies along the B3306 road which connects St Ives to Land's End and the A30 road.

The village has a community centre, a shop, a post office, a primary school, and a few small businesses. Community activities include an art club, a gardening club, silver marching band and a football club. Nearby settlements include Carnyorth and Trewellard and the historic Geevor Tin Mine is immediately north of the village.

The village gets its name from the headland on which Pendeen Lighthouse stands, a mile from the village. Like many other Cornish villages near the coast, Pendeen had a reputation for smuggling activities.

Pendeen is overlooked by a hill, Carn Eanes, referred to locally as 'The Carn', the site of a quarry which provided the granite to build Pendeen church.

Pendeen lies within the Cornwall Area of Outstanding Natural Beauty (AONB) and the St Just in Penwith division of Cornwall Council.

Pendeen is close (1 km) to the South West Coast Path and in addition has a number of local footpaths for exploring the surroundings.

== Origins ==
The area now known as the Parochial Parish of Pendeen, was originally referred to as North St Just and was formed in 1846. It included a number of settlements in the eastern part of the Parochial Parish of St Just.^{[1]} Today the Parochial Parish of Pendeen comprises the settlements of Bojewyan, Portheras Cross, Boscaswell Downs, Lower Boscaswell, Trewellard, Carnyorth and part of Botallack. This area remains part of the civil parish of St Just. Before the splitting of the Parish in 1846 "Pendeen" would have referred to the eponymous headland or Pendeen Manor, birthplace of William Borlase, rather than any of the settlements listed above.

== Buildings and antiquities ==
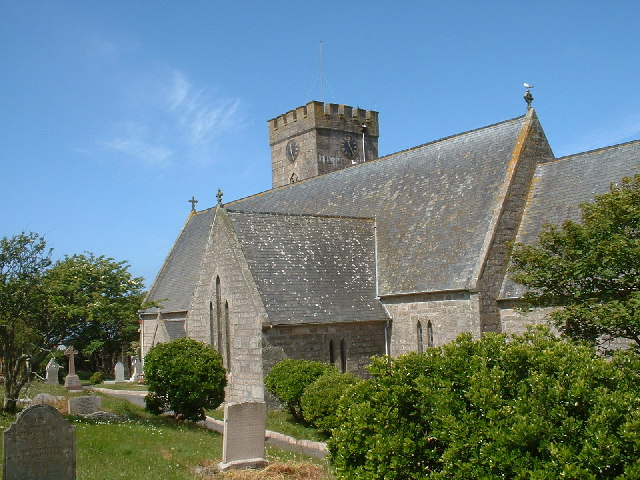
St John's Church, Pendeen

The Church of St John the Baptist is built of local granite and is a Grade II listed building. It was designed by the first vicar Robert Aitken and was based on Iona Abbey. It was built by the villagers from 1850 to 1852 and refurbished in 1878. The church tower was elevated in 1890, ″... to bring it into better proportion to the body of the edifice; ...″, alongwith the installation of a clock and four dials. Oliver Caldwell was the architect and the work cost £270.

There is a Cornish cross in the vicarage garden.

At Pendeen Manor Farm is a 16th-century farmhouse (front added in 1670) and a fogou or vau 56 ft (17 m) long, with a side passage of 24 ft (7.3 m).

== Horsefield's Life in a Cornish Village ==
Pendeen was the subject of the book Life in a Cornish Village by the Rev. F. J. Horsefield in 1893. Horsefield, being an amateur historian, wrote of a multitude of aspects of Pendeen's past.

He wrote, for example, that Chûn Castle, on the 'gump' (Cornish for moor) was most likely a Danish (pre-)viking castle that was built when the indigenous Celts (viz. 'Cornu-Britons') were joined by Danish military allies against the invading Saxons. The gump itself was a battlefield with many discovered urns indicating this violent history. In fact, there remains little trace of provenance for this assertion. Chûn Castle is much older than Horsefield thought and likely dates from the Iron Age, making it much more recent than the neighbouring Neolithic Chûn Quoit.

Boscaswell, arguably a part of Pendeen, traces its name to Bos Castle. Horsefield suggests that what is now Boscaswell was once the site of another Danish castle. Again now not thought to be true, again a wrongful supposition and the name has nothing to do with castles. At the lower end of Boscaswell, recent archaeological excavations are said to have suggested that the land has been occupied for more than 10,000 years. There is an ancient pagan well in Boscaswell which is where the name is thought to have its origins, the name suggests that it is the place (Bos) of Cas' (a person or entity or abbreviation thereof) Well (as in the English word). Problems often exist with such names when they become a hybrid of the indigenous Cornish and the persistent waves of English administration, land ownership and tourism that stretch back into time and continue today.

Horsefield also thought that mining has occurred in Pendeen for over 3000 years. Supposedly, 2000 years ago the Romans brought Jews to Pendeen to work the mines. These Jews, suggests Horsefield, came as slaves from the then recently sacked Jerusalem.

== Geevor tin mine ==
Pendeen is famous for its Geevor Tin Mine, visited by Prince Philip, Duke of Edinburgh in 1957.

== Geography ==
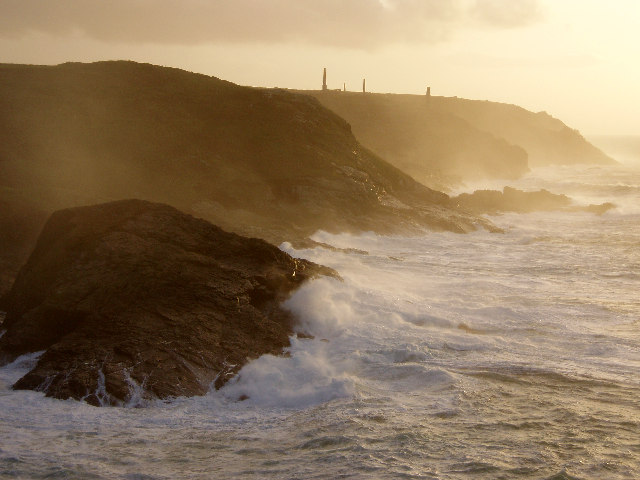
Storm on the coast near the Enys

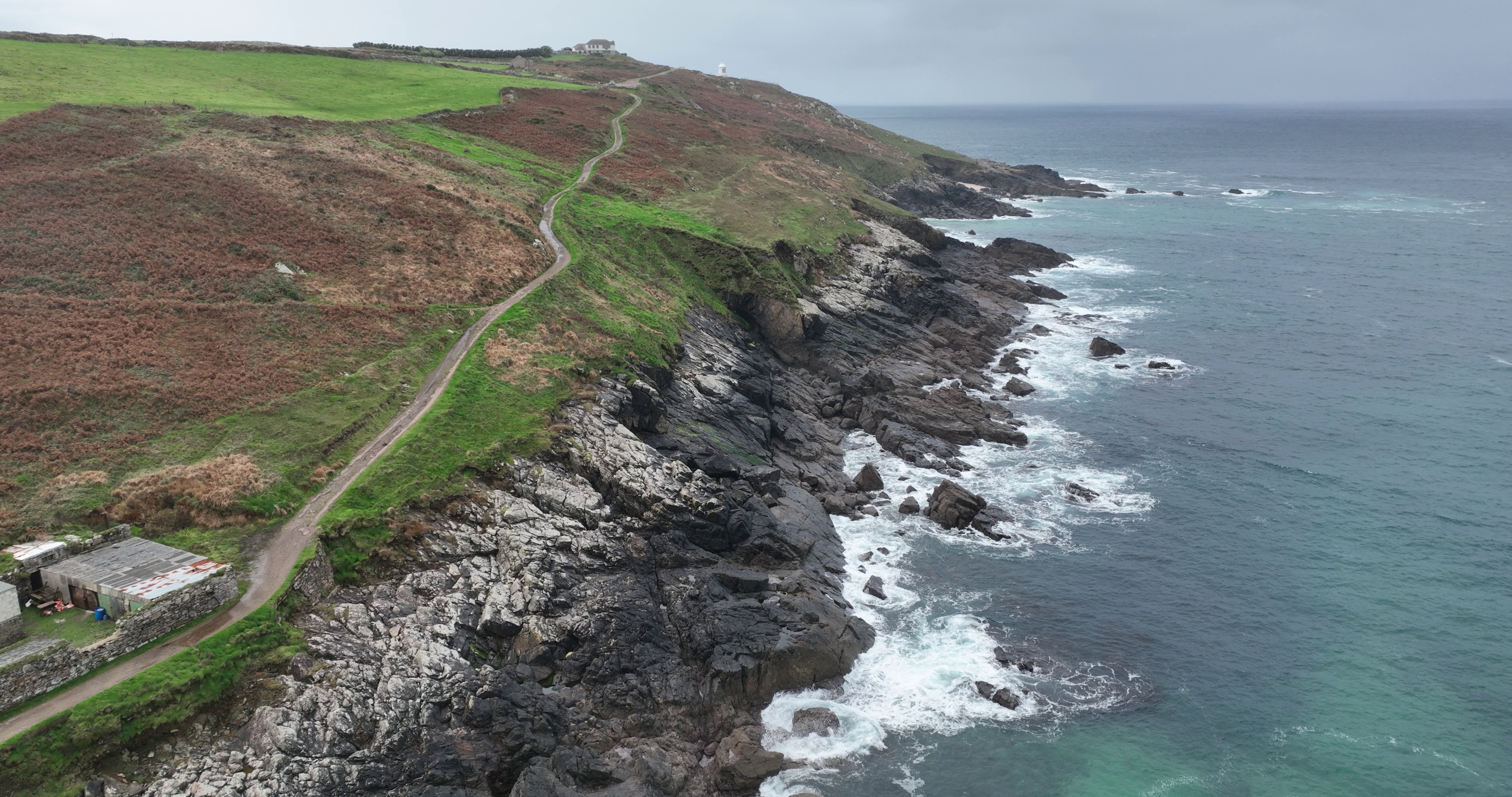
Aerial view of Boat Cove near Pendeen Watch, Cornwall, England.

Horsefield also writes of a large natural cave named Pendeen Vau, the entrance of which is to be found on a cliff. Apparently this cave is vast, going far below and into the sea, but its existence is disputed by many villagers.

Below Boscaswell is an area known as The Craft which is mostly overgrown by gorse, fern and brambles, although many pathways exist. Here can be found abandoned mine buildings dating from the 19th century (including wash houses, engine houses and arsenic baths).

Pendeen boasts three beaches although some are more accessible than others. The largest of them, and the only one accessible at all states of the tide, was for many years the home of a wrecked ship the Alacrity until the army was called in to clear the wreck as it was presenting a danger to swimmers.

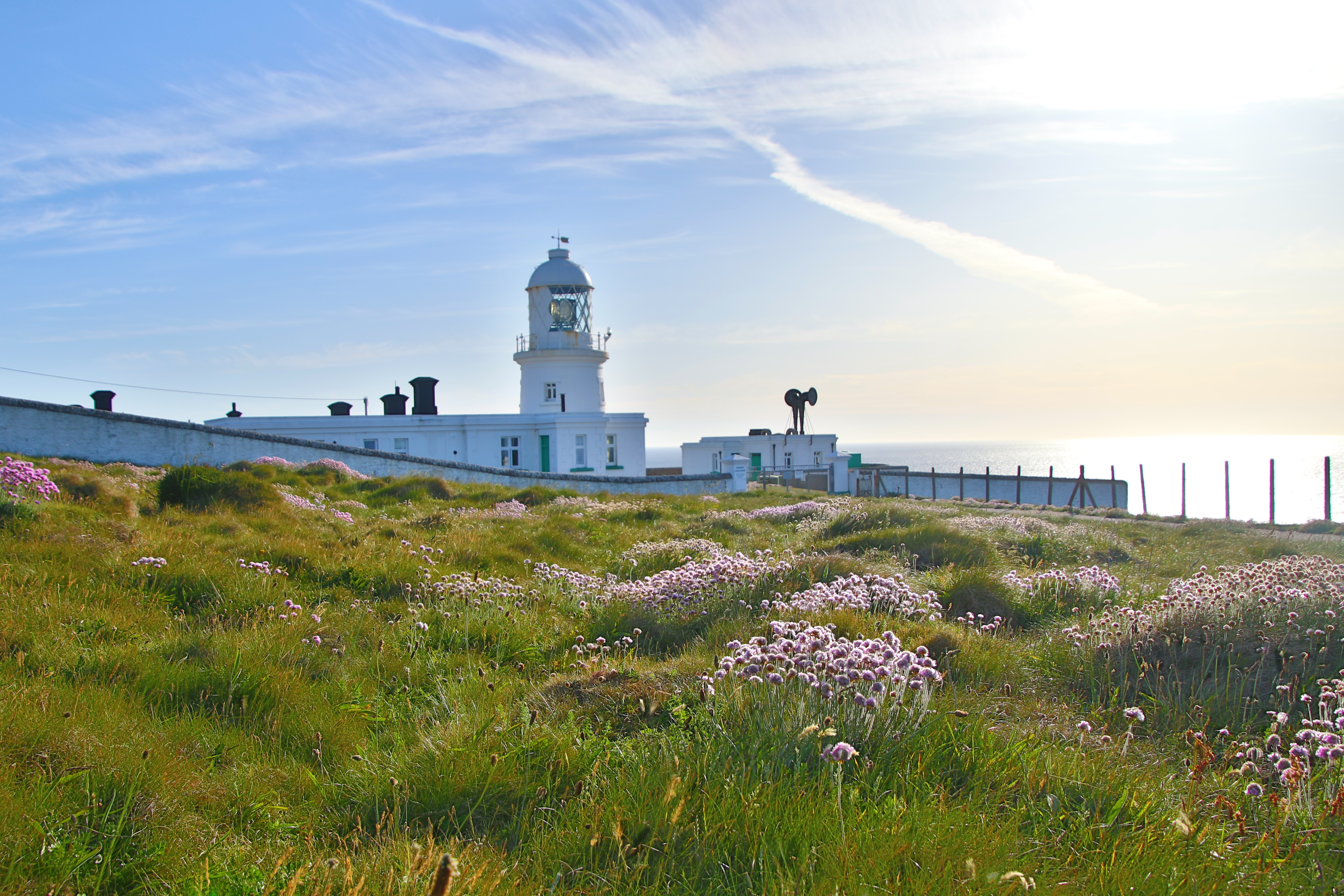
Pendeen Watch lighthouse

Below Pendeen Lighthouse can be found the wreck of The Liberty, although most of it has now been eroded away but the sea parts of the wreck are still visible at low tide on what locals call 'Liberty Rock' which is a favourite fishing spot.

Pendeen Primary School was one of the schools studied in the 1950s by Iona and Peter Opie.

== Cornish wrestling ==
Cornish wrestling tournaments, for prizes, were held in the Jubilee field in Pendeen.

== Notable residents ==
Reverend William Borlase, naturalist and antiquary, was born at Pendeen Manor. He was vicar of St Just for 40 years and rector of Ludgvan for 50. In honour of the Borlase family the local football team Pendeen Rovers AFC ground is called Borlase Park as a thank you to the Borlase family for selling the land that they have played on for many years for the sum of £1,000.

== Pendeen in the media ==
In 2011, Overhill, a low-budget horror film, was shot in Pendeen with a cast made up largely of local people. Following a preview at the North Inn, the film was premiered in the East End Film Festival in June 2013.

In episode six of HBO's Westworld, Anthony Hopkins (Dr Ford) mentions that Pendeen, Cornwall was the 'only happy memory of [his] childhood'.

The local community radio station is Coast FM (formerly Penwith Radio), which broadcasts on 96.5 and 97.2 FM.
