= Lanner, Stithians and Gwennap (electoral division) =

Electoral division of Cornwall in the UK

- ward Cornwall Council
- Boundary of Lanner, Stithians and Gwennap in Cornwall from 2021.
- County: Cornwall

Current ward
- Created: 2021
- Councillor: John Thomas (Independent)
- Number of councillors: One
- Created from: Carharrack, Gwennap and St Day; Lanner and Stithians

Lanner, Stithians and Gwennap is an electoral division of Cornwall in the United Kingdom which returns one member to sit on Cornwall Council. It was created at the 2021 local elections, being created from the former divisions of Carharrack, Gwennap and St Day, and Lanner and Stithians. The current councillor is John Thomas, an independent.

== Boundaries ==
Lanner, Stithians and Gwennap represents the entirety of the parishes of Gwennap, Lanner, and Stithians.

The parish of Gwennap includes the village of Gwennap and the hamlets of Burncoose, Comford, Coombe, Crofthandy, Cusgarne, Fernsplatt, Frogpool, Hick's Mill, Tresamble and United Downs.

The parish of Lanner includes the village of Lanner, Cornwall and the hamlets of Treviskey, and Trevarth.

The parish of Stithians includes the villages of Longdowns, Stithians, and the hamlets of Hendra, Herniss, Penhalurick, and Tresevern Croft.

== Councillors ==
Election	Member	Party
2021	John Thomas	Independent
2025	John Thomas	Independent

== Election results ==
=== 2021 election ===
2021 election: Lanner, Stithians and Gwennap
Party	Candidate	Votes	%	±%
Independent	John Thomas (Note: Incumbent councillor, formerly representing Lanner and Stithians)	712	35.3	N/A
Independent politician	Tim Luscombe	480	23.8	N/A
Conservative	Ben Salfield	361	17.9	N/A
Liberal Democrats	Peter Amoss	219	10.9	N/A
Mebyon Kernow	Samuel Richards	163	8.1	N/A
Green	John Carley	80	4.0	N/A
Majority		232	11.5	N/A
Rejected ballots		14	0.7	N/A
Turnout		2,029		N/A
Independent win (new seat)				
