= Carharrack, Gwennap and St Day (electoral division) =

Former electoral division of Cornwall in the UK

- Former ward Cornwall Council
- Boundary of Carharrack, Gwennap and St Day in Cornwall from 2013-2021.
- County: Cornwall

2013–2021
- Number of councillors: One
- Replaced by: Redruth Central, Carharrack and St Day; Lanner, Stithians and Gwennap
- Created from: St Day and Lanner; Stithians

Carharrack, Gwennap and St Day (Cornish: Karadhek, Lannwenel ha Sen Dey) was an electoral division of Cornwall in the United Kingdom which returned one member to sit on Cornwall Council between 2013 and 2021. It was abolished at the 2021 local elections, being succeeded by Redruth Central, Carharrack and St Day and Lanner, Stithians and Gwennap.

== Councillors ==
Election	Member	Party
2013	Mark Kaczmarek	Independent
2017	Mark Kaczmarek	Independent
2021	Seat abolished	

== Extent ==
Carharrack, Gwennap and St Day represented the villages of St Day, Carharrack, Cusgarne, Gwennap and the hamlets of Tolgullow, Little Beside, Crofthandy, Vogue, Tolcarne, Higher and Lower Ninnis, Busveal, Coombe, Frogpool. The hamlet of Treviskey was shared with the Lanner and Stithians division. Part of Scorrier was also covered (it was shared with the Redruth North, Mount Hawke and Portreath, and Chacewater, Kenwyn and Baldhu divisions). The division covered 2065 hectares in total.

== Election results ==
=== 2017 election ===
2017 election: Carharrack, Gwennap and St Day
Party	Candidate	Votes	%	±%
Independent	Mark Kaczmarek	968	62.9	
Conservative	Kim Lonsdale	241	15.7	
Labour	Andy Blake	145	9.4	
Green	Geoff Garbett	130	8.4	
Liberal Democrats	Adam Killeya	52	3.4	
Majority		727	47.2	
Rejected ballots		3	0.2	
Turnout		1539	40.7	
Independent hold		Swing		

=== 2013 election ===
2013 election: Carharrack, Gwennap and St Day
Party	Candidate	Votes	%	±%
Independent	Mark Kaczmarek	791	76.3	
Green	Geoff Garbett	131	12.6	
Labour	Rosanna Phillips	111	10.7	
Majority		660	63.6	
Rejected ballots		4	0.4	
Turnout		1037	26.8	
Independent win (new seat)				
