= Lanner and Stithians (electoral division) =

Former electoral division of Cornwall in the UK

- Former ward Cornwall Council
- Boundary of Lanner and Stithians in Cornwall from 2013-2021.
- County: Cornwall

2013–2021
- Number of councillors: One
- Replaced by: Lanner, Stithians and Gwennap
- Created from: Stithians; St Day and Lanner

Lanner and Stithians (Cornish: Lannergh ha Stedhyan) was an electoral division of Cornwall in the United Kingdom which returned one member to sit on Cornwall Council between 2013 and 2021. It was abolished at the 2021 local elections, being succeeded by Lanner, Stithians and Gwennap.

== Councillors ==
Election	Member	Party
2013	John Thomas	Independent
2017	John Thomas	Independent
2021	Seat abolished	

== Extent ==
Lanner and Stithians represented the villages of Longdowns, Stithians and Lanner, and the hamlets of Herniss, Hendra, Tresevern Croft, Penhalurick. The hamlet of Treviskey was shared with the Carharrack, Gwennap and St Day division. The division covered 2,340 hectares in total.

== Election results ==
=== 2017 election ===
2017 election: Lanner and Stithians
Party	Candidate	Votes	%	±%
Independent	John Thomas	547	40.2	
Independent	James Biscoe	263	19.3	
Conservative	Oliver Mas	255	18.7	
Labour	Laura Eyre	134	9.8	
Liberal Democrats	Nicholas Prescott	83	6.1	
Mebyon Kernow	Matt Blewett	73	5.4	
Majority		284	20.9	
Rejected ballots		7	0.5	
Turnout		1362	36.0	
Independent hold		Swing		

=== 2013 election ===
2013 election: Lanner and Stithians
Party	Candidate	Votes	%	±%
Independent	John Thomas	441	34.9	
Independent	Neil Plummer	399	31.6	
Independent	James Biscoe	195	15.4	
UKIP	Bob Mims	140	11.1	
Labour	Laura Eyre	85	6.7	
Majority		42	3.3	
Rejected ballots		4	0.3	
Turnout		1264	32.6	
Independent win (new seat)				
