= St Day and Lanner (electoral division) =

Electoral division of Cornwall in the UK

St Day and Lanner
Cornwall Councillors
Name	Party	Years
Mark Kaczmarek	Independent	2009-2013
Cornwall County Councillors
Name	Party	Years
K. Wayne	Labour	1981-1985
W. Pullen	Conservative	1973-1981

St Day and Lanner was an electoral division of Cornwall in the United Kingdom. As a division of Cornwall County Council, it returned one member from 1973 to 1985, when it was superseded by St Day, Lanner and Carharrack. A division to the unitary authority Cornwall Council was also called St Day and Lanner, returning one councillor from 2009 to 2013, after which it was replaced by Carharrack, Gwennap and St Day and Lanner and Stithians.

== Election results ==
=== Cornwall Council division ===
==== Extent ====
St Day and Lanner covered the villages of St Day, Lanner, and the hamlets of Busveal, Trevarth, Pennance. It also covered part of Scorrier which was shared with the Redruth North, Mount Hawke and Portreath and Chacewater and Kenwyn divisions. The division covered 1006 hectares in total.

==== 2009 election ====
2009 election: St Day and Lanner
Party	Candidate	Votes	%	±%
Independent	Mark Kaczmarek	874	65.8	
Independent	John Thomas	308	23.2	
Conservative	Jessie Rheel	94	7.1	
Liberal Democrats	Janet Palmer	45	3.4	
Majority		566	42.6	
Rejected ballots		8	0.6	
Turnout		1329	38.5	
Independent win (new seat)				

=== Cornwall County Council division ===
==== 1981 election ====
1981 election: St Day and Lanner
Party	Candidate	Votes	%	±%
Labour	K. Wayne	509	36.8	
Independent	F. Smitheram	445	32.2	
Conservative	W. Pullen	428	31.0	
Majority		64	4.6	
Turnout		1382	35.1	
Labour gain from Conservative		Swing		

==== 1977 election ====
1977 election: St Day and Lanner
Party	Candidate	Votes	%	±%
Conservative	W. Pullen	501	37.3	
Independent	F. Smitheram	349	26.0	
Independent	D. Nurhonen	296	22.1	
Independent	E. Spargo	196	14.6	
Majority		152	11.3	
Turnout		1342	35.3	
Conservative hold		Swing		

==== 1973 election ====
1973 election: St Day and Lanner
Party	Candidate	Votes	%	±%
Conservative	W. Pullen	Uncontested		
Majority		N/A		
Turnout		N/A		
Conservative win (new seat)				

== See also ==
- Politics of Cornwall
