= John Lawn =

John Lawn may refer to:

- John C. Lawn, Administrator of the Drug Enforcement Administration
- John Lawn (miner) (1840–1905), New Zealand goldminer and mine manager
- John J. Lawn, American state legislator in the Massachusetts House of Representatives
