= John Lawn (miner) =

New Zealand goldminer and mine manager

- Born: 4 November 1840; Gwennap, Cornwall, England
- Died: 29 July 1905 (aged 64)
- Occupations: Goldminer, mine manager
- Known for: Mining activity and management in New Zealand goldfields

John Lawn (4 November 1840 – 29 July 1905) was a New Zealand goldminer and mine manager. He was born in Gwennap, Cornwall, England on 4 November 1840.

Lawn was the third of 11 children of miner James Lawn and his wife Jenefer (née Webster). From a young age he worked as a pickey boy, sorting ore on the ore heaps around Lanner.

In 1857, John and two of his brothers left Cornwall, attracted by the prospects of making their fortunes in Australia's Victoria gold rush. While there, news came of gold discoveries in New Zealand, and the brothers quickly left in the hopes of being early on the ground at the new prospecting sites. They arrived in Otago (probably at Port Chalmers) in late 1861, and walked to the Gabriels Gully diggings, some 50 miles distant. The brothers staked a claim and were lucky to collect almost a pound's-weight of gold within their first 24 hours on the site. A further claim they made nearby also yielded the precious metal.

After four months mining, the brothers left New Zealand for Australia, and it is likely they mined around Tarrengower, but were lured back across the Tasman Sea in 1865 by the West Coast gold rush. John returned to Australia in 1871, working among compatriots in the "Cornish triangle" of copper mines along South Australia's Yorke Peninsula. In 1873, he married Mary (née Coombe, d. 1902) in Wallaroo, and moved, along with a growing family, to Reefton in New Zealand's South Island. Here he both worked as a miner and later managed mines in the area's quartz gold mines.

Lawn died at Reefton in 1905, two days after a fall from a horse. He was survived by 10 children.
