= Tolgullow =

Hamlet in Cornwall, England

Coordinates: 50°14′36″N 5°11′07″W

Tolgullow is a hamlet near St Day in west Cornwall, England, United Kingdom. It is on the B3298 road to Gwennap.
