= Henry Wright (artist) =

English painter

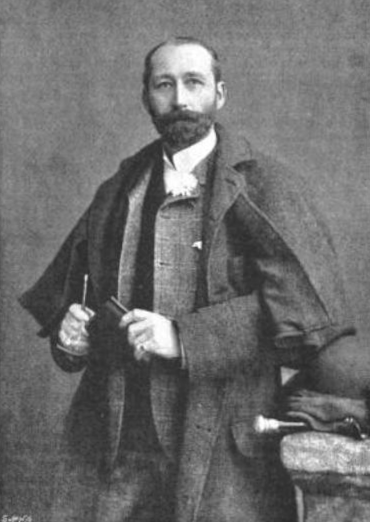
- In The Sketch, 18 December 1895
- Born: Henry Charles Seppings Wright; January 1849; Stithians, Cornwall, England
- Died: 7 February 1937 (aged 88); Bosham, West Sussex, England
- Occupation(s): Artist, writer
- Spouses: Marie Eliza Willows (m. 1884) Charlotte Yellowley Loftus Brock (m. 1927)

Henry Charles Seppings Wright (1849–1937) was an English artist, illustrator, war correspondent, and author.

== Life ==
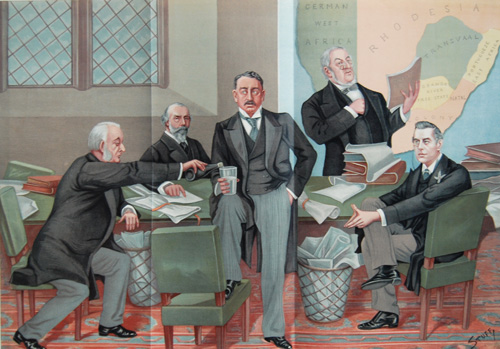
"South Africa Committee" by "Stuff", in Vanity Fair, 1897

Born in January 1849 at Stithians, Redruth, Cornwall, Wright was the son of a clergyman, the Rev. Francis Hill Arbuthnot Wright. In 1881, Wright, aged 32, was a painter and was living with his parents at Pendleton. His father was then Vicar of St Paul's, Paddington.

Wright contributed caricatures to Vanity Fair under the pseudonym "Stuff" and also worked for the Illustrated London News. He served as a war correspondent in Tripoli and with Tōgō's navy and wrote books about his experiences overseas, which he illustrated.

Wright participated in the looting of Benin City during the British Benin Expedition of 1897.

== Personal life ==
In 1884, Wright married Marie Eliza Willows in Croydon.

At the census of 1901, Wright was living at Roxborough Park, Harrow on the Hill, with his wife, Marie Seppings Wright, and children Frank, 15, Nellie, 14, and Stamford, 7. He gave his occupation as War Correspondent and the family had a cook and housemaid.

On 6 October 1927, Wright married secondly Charlotte Yellowley Loftus Brock at the Church of St Barnabas, Pimlico.

He died at his home in Bosham on 7 February 1937.

== Selected publications ==
- With Togo: The Story of Seven Months' Active Service Under His Command (London: Hurst and Blackett, 1905)
- Two Years Under the Crescent (1913; reprinted by Palala Press, 2015, ISBN 978-1347251775)
