= Lanner and District Silver Band =

Brass band based in the UK

The Lanner & District Silver Band is a brass band based in Lanner, Cornwall, United Kingdom, and an important part of village life.

== History ==
The original Lanner & District Silver Band was formed in the Cornish village of Lanner in the mid-1890s. However, following large-scale emigration from the mining district it disbanded in 1902.

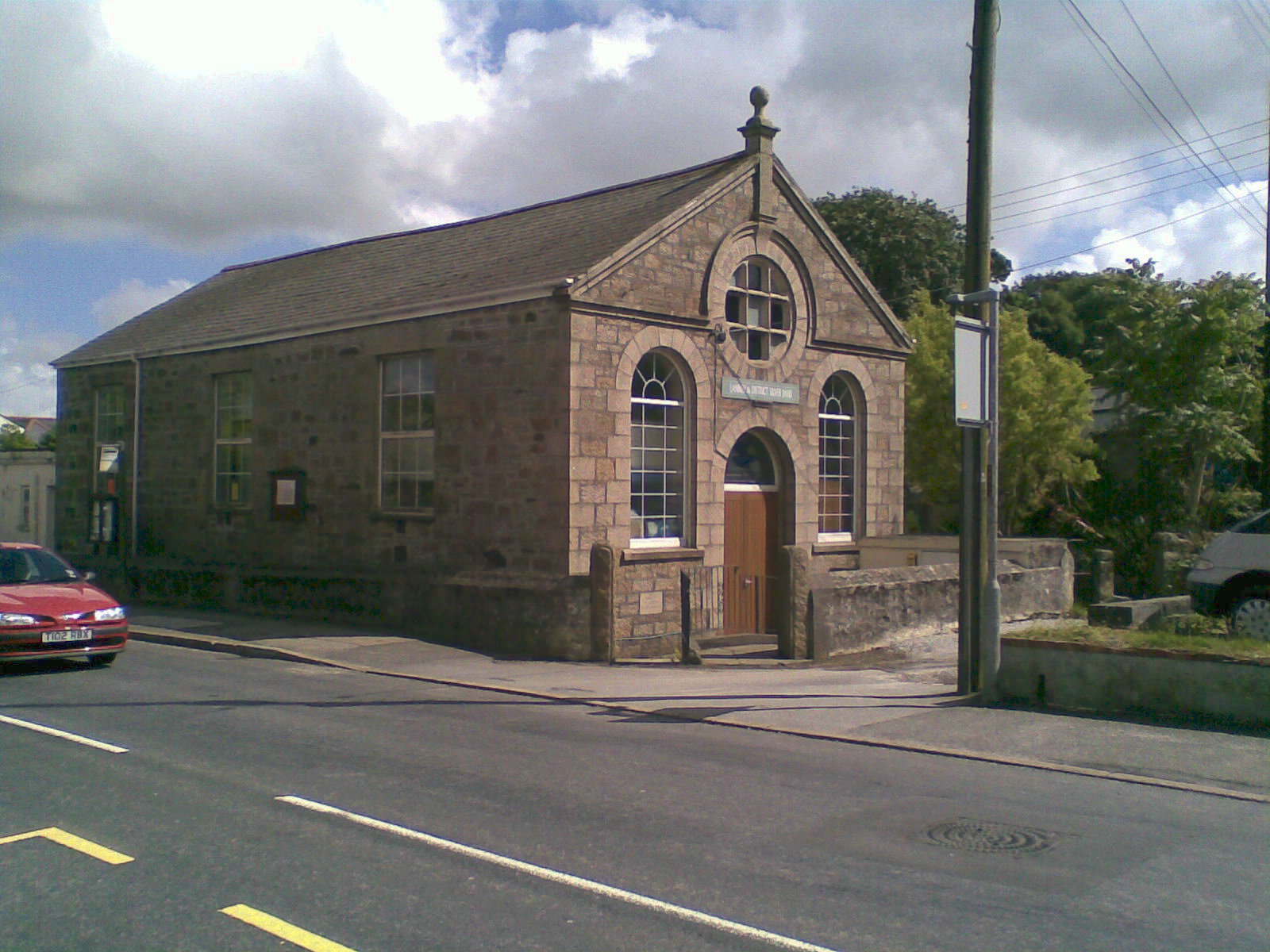
Lanner Band Room

The band was reformed in 1965, and in those early days practised in a chicken shed in the garden of Lanner resident Daisy Moyle. Mrs. Moyle later became the band's first 'Life Member'.

As the band attracted more members they outgrew the chicken shed and moved to a bandroom at the top of Lanner Hill. From these humble beginnings a strong youth band emerged, and as time went by these young players progressed into the senior band, thus helping to sustain its development. Eventually, even the Lanner Hill Bandroom became too small, and a concerted effort from the players and committee members resulted in the purchase, in 1983, of the old Primitive Methodist chapel on Lanner Moor, which is the present band's headquarters.

== Current activities ==
Lanner & District Silver band has progressed from its early days in the fourth section of the Cornish and national ratings, and is today one of the finest bands in Cornwall (a county which has around 40 silver bands). It has represented the South West area at the National Finals and won many other contests throughout the south west. In April 2003 the band was crowned West of England 2nd Section Champions. This promoted the band to the 1st Section and gained them qualification to the National Brass Band Championships of Great Britain. The success continued later that year when, at the finals, the band achieved a magnificent 3rd place. Since that time the band has competed successfully in the First Section and will be proud to be competing in the Championship Section as of January 2014. The success continues and the Lanner Band is recognised as one of the most innovative, entertaining and successful bands in Cornwall.

In July 2013 the band successfully completed the building of its new Headquarters and recording facility, which can also be used as a community venue. Funded by the generous donation of a grant from the Sita Cornwall Trust, the building was completed with a huge amount of voluntary work by band members and committee.

The band plays at the head of the Lanner Carnival parade in July and the Remembrance Day parade in November, which march through the village every year along with Scouting groups, a number of village groups, and decorated floats.
