= Stithians Show =

Annual agricultural show in Cornwall, United Kingdom

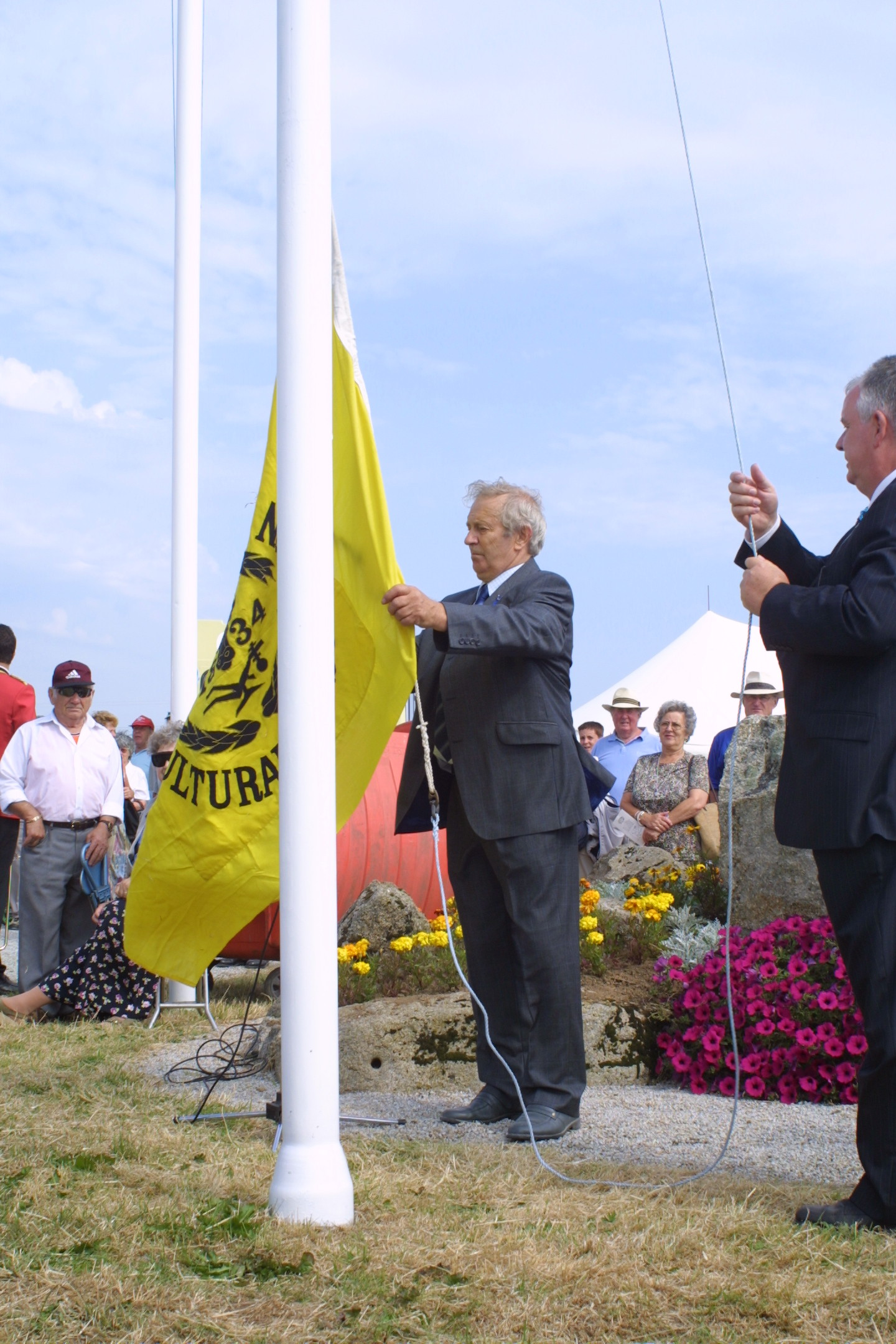
- Hoisting the Flag at Stithians Show

Details
- Location: Stithians
- Month: July
- Type: Agricultural Show
- Website: http://www.stithiansshow.org.uk

Stithians Show (the annual agricultural show organised by the Stithians Agricultural Association) takes place on the day after Feast Sunday (the Sunday closest to 13 July) in the village of Stithians, Cornwall. It was first held in 1834 and is recognised as being one of the largest one-day shows in the United Kingdom, regularly attracting in excess of 20,000 visitors, exhibitors, competitors, traders and entertainers.

The show has competitive sections (livestock, fur & feather, show jumping, horticulture and domestic), trade stands, side shows, entertainment, and catering.

== Competitive sections ==
The Show is divided into several competitive sections each with its own Committee (usually with a chairman, Secretary, and Treasurer). The main sections of the show are:

Arts, Craft & Cookery (formerly Domestic) Cage Birds, Cattle, Cavies (New in 2013), Dog Show, Dog Agility, Goats, Horse Show, Horticulture, Pigeons, Poultry, Rabbits, Sheep, Young Farmers Club

== Trade Stands, Side Shows, and Entertainment ==
As well as the competitive sections, there are many other attractions to entertain, inform and sell:

- Community & Churches
- Countryside Area
- Craft Stalls
- Entertainment – Kelly's Entertainment Area and the bandstand.
- Fairground
- Catering
- Steam & Vintage
- Taste of Cornwall
- Cornish wrestling
- Trade Stalls

== History ==
=== The Show Grounds ===
It is unclear exactly where the first shows were held, with references to 'Churchtown' (the land now occupied by the Church Hall [now the Stithians Centre] and the village school) appearing in The West Briton on 27 July 1838. The 51st show (1885) was held in a field next to the Seven Stars hotel. For many years (certainly in living memory) the show was held in the fields which form part of the Ennis and Carbis Farm, with the playing fields in the heart of the village forming the hub from 1938. Fields on the glebe land were used as the Show expanded, and it was increased rental on this land that caused the relocation of the Show in 1992.

In 1992 the Association was fortunate enough to purchase 65 acres (260,000 m^{2}) of Kennal Farm and to establish the present site. The Show has now left the heart of the village, but with improved car-parking, access, and permanent water and electricity supplies, this has enabled the Show to become self-sufficient.

The Show was first held in 1834 and has been held continuously since then (except for three years during World War I, and five years during World War II; and there was no show in 2001 due to the nationwide outbreak of foot and mouth disease).

In 2020 and 2021 the show was postponed due to Covid-19. The Show ground was repurposed as a vaccination center.

=== Former presidents (Stithians unless stated) ===
| Year | President | Year | President | Year | President |
|---|---|---|---|---|---|
| 1875 | Rev F Wright, Vicar of Stythians | 1876 | Rev F Wright, Vicar of Stythians | 1877 | Rev H Harmer, Vicar of Stythians |
| 1878 | Rev H Harmer, Vicar of Stythians | 1879 | W S Williams | 1880 | W S Williams |
| 1881 | W S Williams | 1882 | W S Williams | 1883 | W S Williams |
| 1884 | W S Williams | 1885 | John Williams, Scorrier House | 1886 | N J West, Hayle |
| 1887 | J C Williams, Caerhays | 1888 | J C Williams, Caerhays | 1889 | J C Williams, Caerhays |
| 1890 | Colonel Tremayne, Carclew | 1891 | J Jose, Mellingey | 1892 | E B Beauchamp, Trevince |
| 1893 | John Williams, Caerhays | 1894 | E P Rogers, Burncoose | 1895 | N J West, Hayle |
| 1896 | N J West, Hayle | 1897 | J C Williams, Caerhays | 1898 | Sir E D Lawrence, London |
| 1899 | A Bassett, Tehidy | 1900 | Sir E D Lawrence, London | 1901 | A Lanyon, Redruth |
| 1902 | J C Williams, Caerhays | 1903 | Harcourt Williams, Truro | 1904 | Sir E D Lawrence, London |
| 1905 | John Williams, Scorrier House | 1906 | E B Beauchamp, Trevince | 1907 | J C Williams, Caerhays |
| 1908 | Charles Williams, Caerhays | 1909 | Capt S H Christy, Scorrier | 1910 | C H Beauchamp, Trevince |
| 1911 | A Wallis | 1912 | GFT Peters, Chiverton | 1913 | Hon J Boscawen, Penzance |
| 1914 | Capt W F Tremayne, Carclew | 1915 | S H Lanyon, Redruth | 1916 | NO SHOW World War I |
| 1917 | NO SHOW World War I | 1918 | NO SHOW World War I | 1919 | Capt W F Tremayne, Carclew |
| 1920 | N H Holman, Camborne | 1921 | T Trounson, Redruth | 1922 | G P Williams, Scorrier |
| 1923 | CH Simmons, London | 1924 | J Harris, Caerhays | 1925 | J C Williams, Caerhays |
| 1926 | C H Simmons, London | 1927 | G P Williams, Scorrier | 1928 | CH Peters, London |
| 1929 | W W Bulkley | 1930 | A Collins, South Africa | 1931 | W J Opie, Redruth |
| 1932 | P M Williams, Burncoose | 1933 | A C Phillips | 1934 | Cmdr A G Agnew MP |
| 1935 | C J Cooke, Redruth | 1936 | G Hughes, Redruth | 1937 | C Hancock, Truro |
| 1938 | H J Collins, London | 1939 | A Philips, St Austell | 1940 | NO SHOW World War II |
| 1941 | NO SHOW World War II | 1942 | NO SHOW World War II | 1943 | NO SHOW World War II |
| 1944 | NO SHOW World War II | 1945 | B W Knuckey | 1946 | J S Richards |
| 1947 | W J Andrew | 1948 | J Mitchell, Perranporth | 1949 | W J T Peters |
| 1950 | W J Dunstan, Camborne | 1951 | W J Thomas, Cusgarne | 1952 | P M Phillips, Burncoose |
| 1953 | J H Phillips, St Austell | 1954 | Mrs D M Briddon | 1955 | A Opie |
| 1956 | W F Gluyas | 1957 | W Opie | 1958 | Miss J Hellings |
| 1959 | C H Andrew, Falmouth | 1960 | H S Felton, Kettering | 1961 | H E Phillips |
| 1962 | J T Jelbert, Wendron | 1963 | Rev J R Hose, Perranarworthal | 1964 | H Prowse |
| 1965 | W J Kneebone, Perranwell | 1966 | W J Andrew, Treskillard | 1967 | W Prose |
| 1968 | L J Richards, Frogpool | 1969 | RM Berryman, Ladock | 1970 | E J Brown |
| 1971 | Jack R Williams | 1972 | S Trevena | 1973 | W Pascoe |
| 1974 | Mrs E M Phillips | 1975 | J R Knuckey, Ponsanooth | 1976 | B Martin, Truro |
| 1977 | Mrs E Jones, Perranporth | 1978 | S Lean, Redruth | 1979 | B Dale, Gwennap |
| 1980 | E T Paget | 1981 | Dr C A Biscoe | 1982 | J M Turnbull, Falmouth |
| 1983 | R M Eddy, Redruth | 1984 | W Prowse | 1985 | N J Jeffery |
| 1986 | Mrs J Green, Longdowns | 1987 | R Pascoe | 1988 | H Kneebone, Perranwell Station |
| 1989 | H Opie | 1990 | H D Martin, Trispen | 1991 | H D J Reed, Radnor |
| 1992 | P J R Stephens, Redruth | 1993 | W P Gluyas | 1994 | L R Barter |
| 1995 | Mrs E F (Lee) Bowden | 1996 | T K Plummer, Truro | 1997 | J B G Holt, Probus |
| 1998 | Mis K Mead | 1999 | M May, Feock | 2000 | T Wills, Warwick |
| 2001 | NO SHOW (Foot and mouth) | 2002 | I Perry, Helston | 2003 | D C Tangye, Perranwell Station |
| 2004 | R Manhire, Illogan | 2005 | R Pascoe, Colchester | 2006 | L Roskilly, Ponsanooth |
| 2007 | R Bowden | 2008 | D Nicholls | 2009 | C Bowden |
| 2010 | J Large, Kea | 2011 | M Tripp | 2012 | D Oates, Redruth |
| 2013 | Rev Danny Reed, Lanner | 2014 | Mr S Kimberley, Falmouth | | |
