= Herniss =

Hamlet in Cornwall, England

Coordinates: 50.166°N 5.173°W

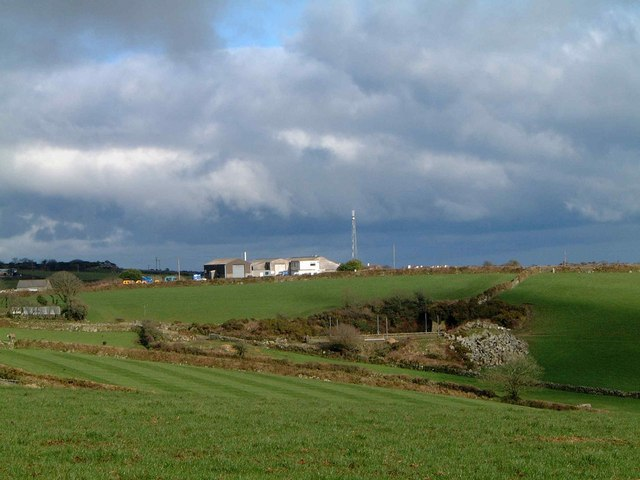
An industrial site at Herniss Quarry

Herniss is a hamlet in the civil parish of Mabe in west Cornwall, England. Herniss is on the A394 main road. It is in the civil parish of Stithians
