= Tresevern Croft =

Hamlet in Cornwall, England, United Kingdom

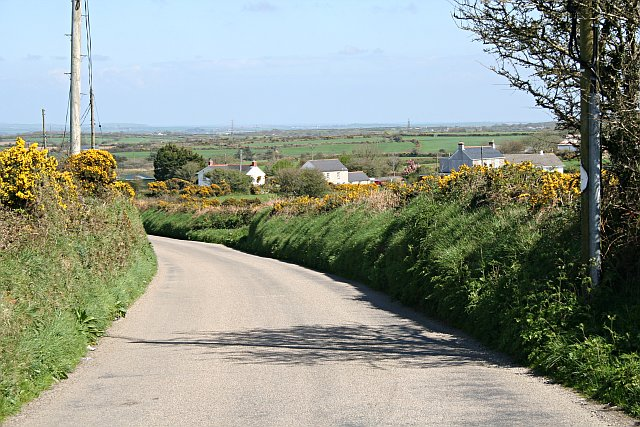
View towards Tresevern

Tresevern Croft is a hamlet west of Stithians, in west Cornwall, England, United Kingdom.
