= Penhalurick =

Coordinates: 50.195°N 5.207°W

- Location within Cornwall
- Civil parish: Stithians
- Unitary authority: Cornwall
- Ceremonial county: Cornwall
- Region: South West
- Country: England
- Sovereign state: United Kingdom
- Postcode district: TR16
- Police: Devon and Cornwall
- Fire: Cornwall
- Ambulance: South Western

Penhalurick is a hamlet in the parish of Stithians, Cornwall, England.

There is also a Cornish surname Penhallurick (with variants Penhalurick, &c.); it is well recorded in Cornish parish registers from the late 16th century. Among living bearers of the name is Robert Penhallurick, a linguist specialising in the English language.
