= Hicks Mill =

Hamlet in Cornwall, England

Coordinates: 50°13′39″N 5°07′51″W

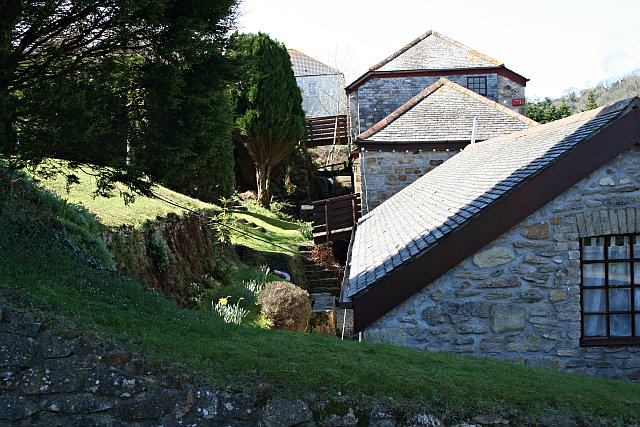
Hick's Mill

Hicks Mill is a rural hamlet in Cornwall, England. It is located about 7 km (4.3 mi) WSW from the cathedral city of Truro.

The hamlet is situated on the north-facing slopes of a valley whose stream runs into the Carnon River about 500 metres (1,600 ft) downstream in the Bissoe Valley Nature Reserve. The valley falls from an elevation of 50 m (160 ft) to 20 m (66 ft) in a distance to 240 m (790 ft), an average grade of 1 in 8.

The hamlet of Hicks Mill is in the civil parish of Gwennap and is related to postcodes TR4 8RB, TR4 8RD and TR4 8SX. There are some 29 residential properties.

Hicks Mill is named for a historic flour mill that is registered on the National heritage site list for England as a Listed Building Grade II, List Entry Number: 1140910. The mill is found at Latitude 50° 13' 40" N, Longitude 5° 7' 54" W.

Hicks Mill Bible Christian Chapel was built close to the Mill in 1821. It has been enlarged several times and has associations with the 19th-century Cornish evangelist Billy Bray.
