= Treviskey =

Human settlement in Cornwall, England

Coordinates: 50°13′34″N 4°53′39″W

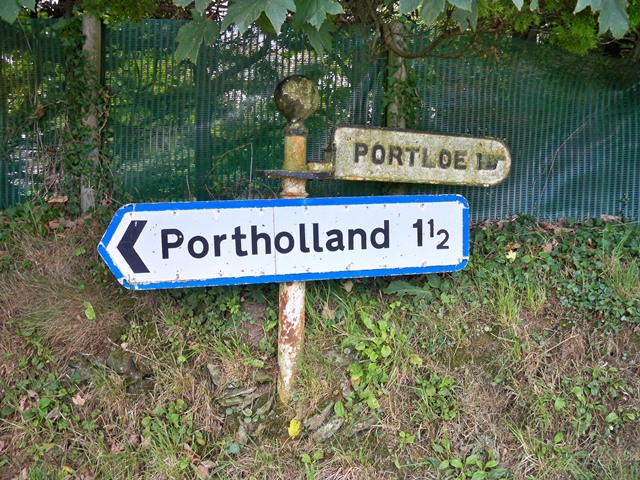

- Location within Cornwall
- Civil parish: Veryan
- Unitary authority: Cornwall
- Ceremonial county: Cornwall
- Region: South West
- Country: England
- Sovereign state: United Kingdom
- Police: Devon and Cornwall
- Fire: Cornwall
- Ambulance: South Western

Treviskey is a hamlet in the civil parish of Veryan, in the county of Cornwall, England.

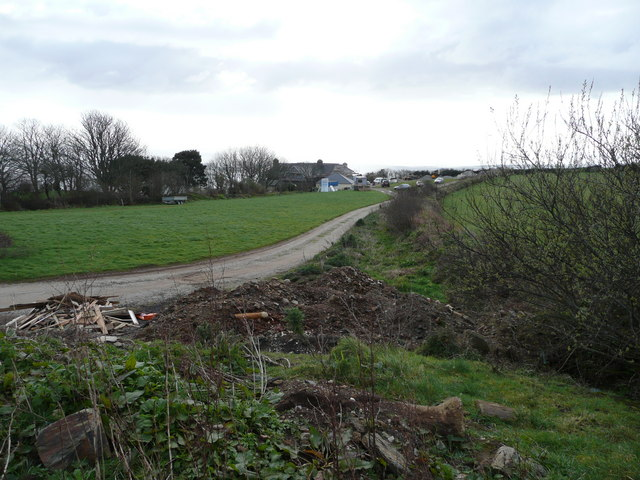
View from Treviskey Hill
