= Fernsplatt =

Coordinates: 50.231°N 5.141°W

- Location within Cornwall
- OS grid reference: SW761415
- Civil parish: Gwennap
- Unitary authority: Cornwall
- Ceremonial county: Cornwall
- Region: South West
- Country: England
- Sovereign state: United Kingdom
- Post town: REDRUTH
- Postcode district: TR16
- Dialling code: 01872
- Police: Devon and Cornwall
- Fire: Cornwall
- Ambulance: South Western
- UK Parliament: Truro and Falmouth

Fernsplatt is a hamlet 4 miles (6.4 km) east of Redruth in Cornwall, England. Fernsplatt lies at around 70 metres (230 ft) above sea level in the civil parish of Gwennap and is located in the Cornwall and West Devon Mining Landscape which was designated as a World Heritage Site in 2006.
