= Comford =

Coordinates: 50.21517°N 5.17677°W

- Location within Cornwall
- OS grid reference: SW735398
- Shire county: Cornwall
- Region: South West
- Country: England
- Sovereign state: United Kingdom
- Post town: Redruth
- Postcode district: TR16
- Police: Devon and Cornwall
- Fire: Cornwall
- Ambulance: South Western

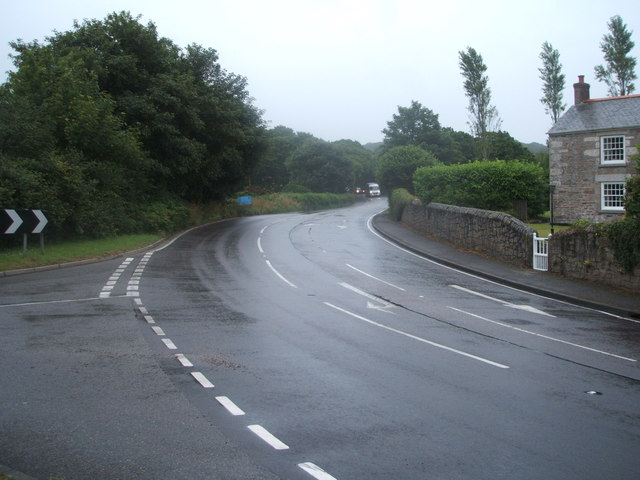
The A393 in Comford

Comford is a small settlement in Cornwall, England, United Kingdom. It is approximately 3 miles (5 km) southeast of Redruth on the A393 road and very close to Gwennap.
