= Little Beside =

Country house in Cornwall, England

- Esti Byhan (Cornish)
- Location within Cornwall
- 50.24223°N 5.17853°W
- Location: Gwennap, Cornwall, England

Listed Building – Grade II
- Official name: Little Beside House
- Designated: 3 February 1986
- Reference no.: 1328977

Little Beside House (Cornish: Esti Byhan) is a Grade II listed country house in the civil parish of Gwennap, Cornwall, England, UK. It was built in the early 19th century and extended in the early-mid 19th century.
