= Coombe, Gwennap =

Hamlet in Cornwall, England

Coordinates: 50.226°N 5.138°W

Coombe: Cornish: Komm
- Location within Cornwall
- Unitary authority: Cornwall
- Region: South West
- Country: England
- Sovereign state: United Kingdom
- Police: Devon and Cornwall
- Fire: Cornwall
- Ambulance: South Western

Coombe (Cornish: Komm) is a settlement in Gwennap civil parish, Cornwall, England, United Kingdom. It is situated approximately three-and-a-half miles (6 km) southeast of Redruth at grid reference SW 763 409.

The name 'Komm' in Cornish means 'small valley, dingle'. Compare the Welsh 'cwm'.
