= Crofthandy =

Hamlet in Cornwall, England

Coordinates: 50.2383°N 5.1721°W

Crofthandy: Cornish: Krofthendi
- Location within Cornwall
- OS grid reference: SW739424
- Civil parish: Gwennap
- Unitary authority: Cornwall
- Ceremonial county: Cornwall
- Region: South West
- Country: England
- Sovereign state: United Kingdom
- Post town: Redruth
- Postcode district: TR16
- Police: Devon and Cornwall
- Fire: Cornwall
- Ambulance: South Western

Crofthandy (Cornish: Krofthendi, meaning ancient house croft) is a hamlet in the parish of Gwennap, Cornwall, England.
