= Longdowns =

Village in Cornwall, England

Coordinates: 50.164°N 5.159°W

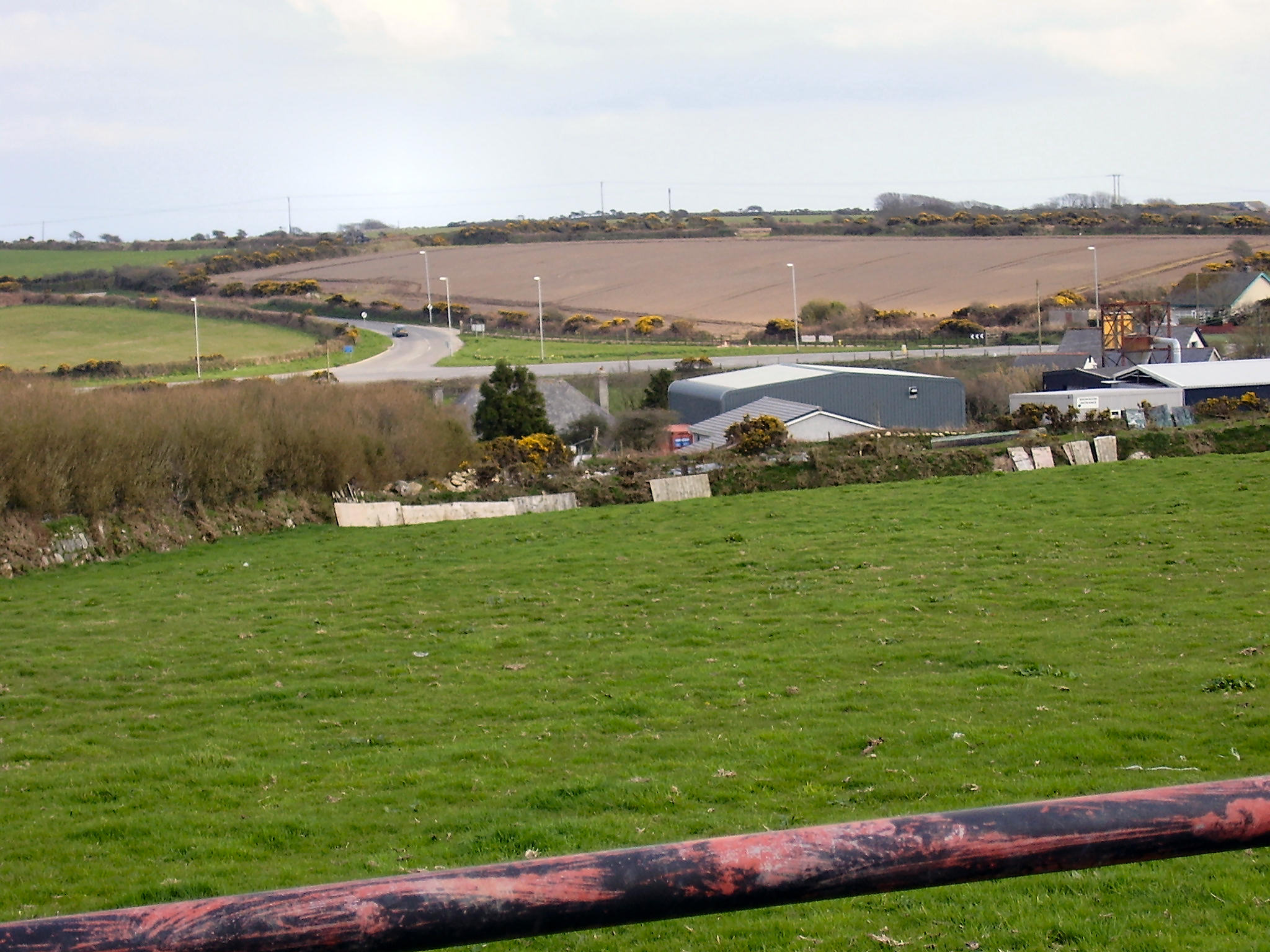
The road approaching Long downs

Long downs is a village in Cornwall, United Kingdom. It is situated on the A394 road approximately three miles (4.8 km) west of Penryn . Longdowns is in the civil parish of Stithians (where the population of the 2011 census is included.).

Longdowns is in an area of granite quarries, some active some disused. The village has a petrol station, a convenience store. It still has a working blacksmith's shop.

John Spargo, the American socialist, was born in Long downs.
