= Cusgarne =

Coordinates: 50.224°N 5.143°W

Cusgarne: Cornish: Kosgaran
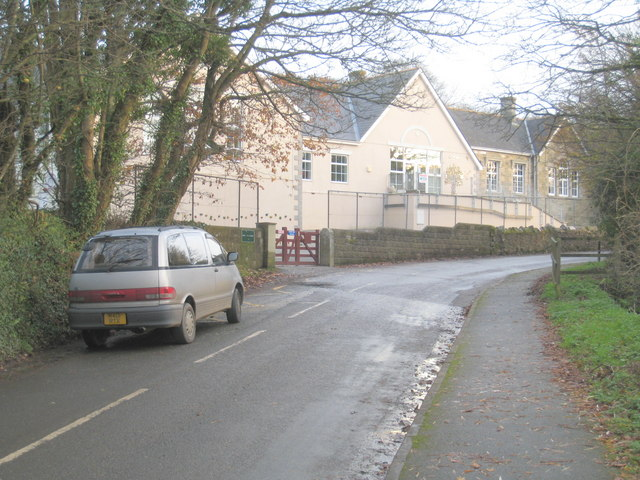
- Cusgarne Community Primary School

- Location within Cornwall
- OS grid reference: SW758407
- Civil parish: Gwennap
- Shire county: Cornwall
- Region: South West
- Country: England
- Sovereign state: United Kingdom
- Post town: Truro
- Postcode district: TR4
- Police: Devon and Cornwall
- Fire: Cornwall
- Ambulance: South Western

Cusgarne (Cornish: Kosgaran) is a village in Cornwall, England, UK. It is about 6 miles (9.7 km) from Truro and 5 miles (8.0 km) from Redruth. It is in the civil parish of Gwennap

Cusgarne Community Primary School is in the centre of the village. It caters for children from the ages of 4–11 with the majority moving on to nearby Penryn College or either Richard Lander or Penair schools.

The name Cusgarne comes from the Cornish language words koos, meaning 'wood', and garan, meaning 'heron' or 'crane'.
