= Frogpool =

Coordinates: 50.217°N 5.142°W

Frogpool: Cornish: Polkwilkyn
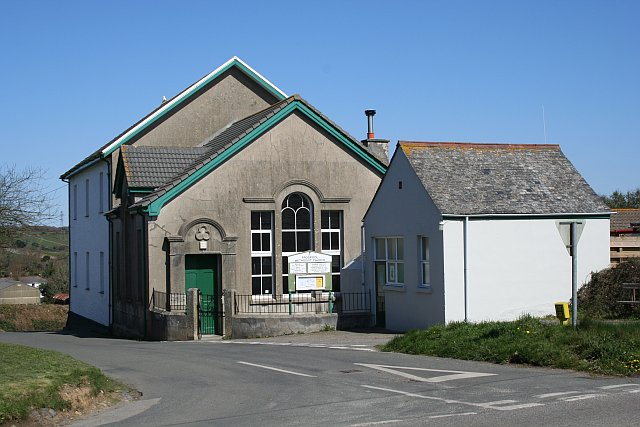
- Frogpool Methodist Church.

- Location within Cornwall
- OS grid reference: SW760401
- Civil parish: Gwennap
- Unitary authority: Cornwall
- Shire county: Cornwall
- Ceremonial county: Cornwall
- Region: South West
- Country: England
- Sovereign state: United Kingdom
- Post town: TRURO
- Postcode district: TR4
- Dialling code: 01872
- Police: Devon and Cornwall
- Fire: Cornwall
- Ambulance: South Western
- UK Parliament: Truro & Falmouth

Frogpool (Cornish: Polkwilkyn) is a hamlet in the parish of Gwennap (where the 2011 census population was included), Cornwall, England. Frogpool is situated 6 miles (9.7 km) south-west of Truro and 1.2 miles (1.9 km) from the nearest railway station at Perranwell Station. It has a local public house called the Cornish Arms and up until a few years ago also had a local convenience store which has since closed.

== Cornish wrestling ==
There were Cornish wrestling tournaments, for prizes, held at the Cornish Arms inn in Frogpool
