= Busveal =

Coordinates: 50.23244°N 5.20185°W

Busveal: Cornish: Bosvel
- Location within Cornwall
- OS grid reference: SW716418
- Shire county: Cornwall
- Region: South West
- Country: England
- Sovereign state: United Kingdom
- Post town: Redruth
- Postcode district: TR16
- Police: Devon and Cornwall
- Fire: Cornwall
- Ambulance: South Western

Busveal (Cornish: Bosvel) is a mining settlement in west Cornwall, United Kingdom. It is located approximately one mile east of Redruth. It is in the civil parish of St Day.

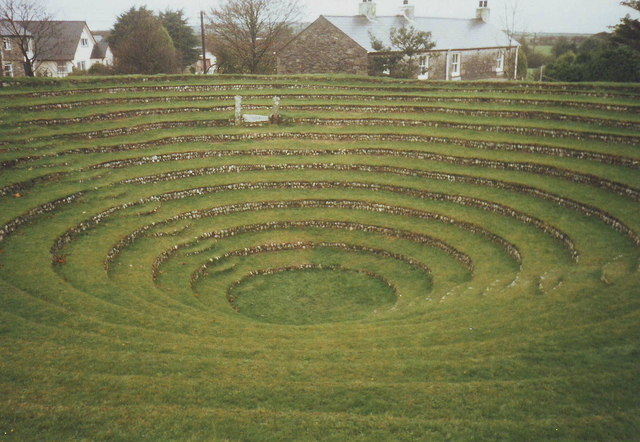
Gwennap Pit
