= Lanner, Cornwall =

Village in Cornwall, England

Coordinates: 50.216°N 5.201°W

Lanner: Cornish: Lannergh
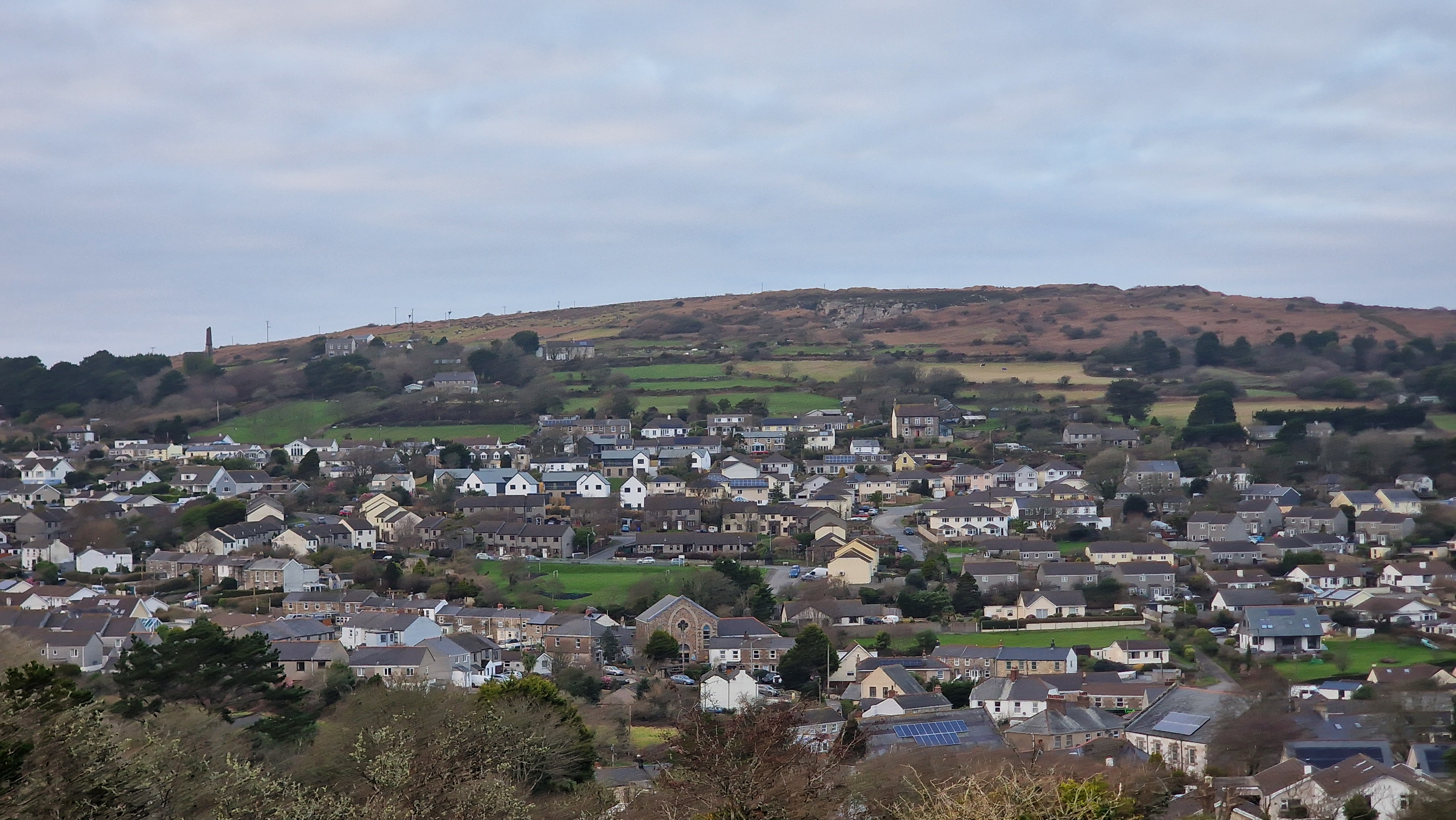
- Lanner village with Carn Marth beyond

- Location within Cornwall
- Population: 2,701 (United Kingdom Census 2011 including Carnkie )
- OS grid reference: SW716400
- Civil parish: Lanner
- Unitary authority: Cornwall
- Ceremonial county: Cornwall
- Region: South West
- Country: England
- Sovereign state: United Kingdom
- Post town: REDRUTH
- Postcode district: TR16
- Dialling code: 01209
- Police: Devon and Cornwall
- Fire: Cornwall
- Ambulance: South Western
- UK Parliament: Camborne and Redruth

A historic photo of Brays Terrace and Woodland Terrace

Lanner (Cornish: Lannergh) is a village and civil parish in west Cornwall, England, United Kingdom. It is situated on the A393 about 2 miles (3.2 km) south-east of Redruth.

Lanner is in the St Day, Carharrack and Lanner ward which had a collective population of 5,438 in 2001. The population of Lanner civil parish was 2,493 in the 2001 census, increasing to 2,690 at the 2011 census. The village has a primary school, Lanner School.

== History ==
The name "Lanner" comes from the Cornish "Lannergh", which means "a clearing". The village is a former tin and copper mining parish which grew rapidly in the 19th century, but has been recorded as far back as 1542, and with settlement traces back to the Bronze Age.

Michael Loam erected his first man engine at Tresavean mine, Lanner, in 1842. The mine was, in its heyday, one of the most productive copper mines in Cornwall.

=== Church history ===
The parish church, Christ Church, is in the Diocese of Truro and was consecrated on St Swithin's day, 1845. It is a small stuccoed building and was restored in 1883. The registers date from 1839.

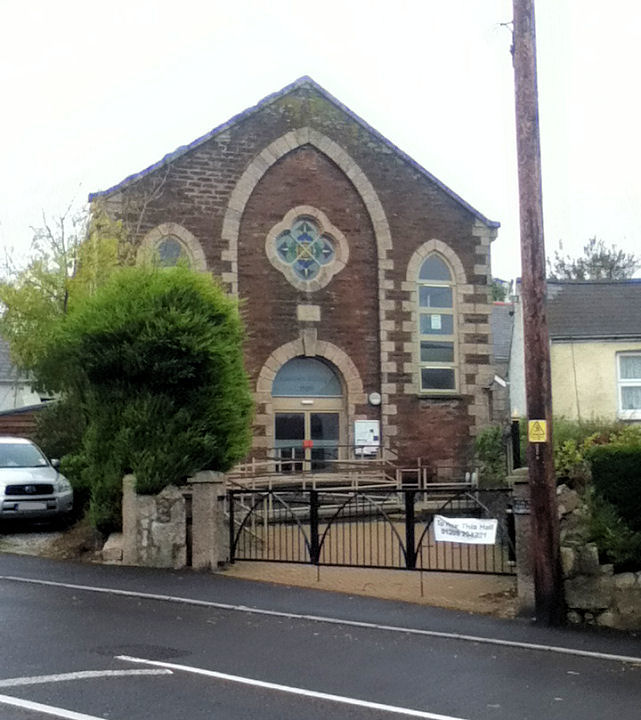
The former Bible Christian chapel has been converted into the village hall

The foundation stone of the Anglican chapel (which became the parish church in 1844) in Lanner was laid on 20 April 1839. The Times reported that "On Wednesday, the 20th ult., the first stone of a new chapel at Lanner, in Gwennap, was laid by the Venerable Archdeacon Sheepshanks". Until constituted a parish in 1844 Lanner (or Lannarth) was part of the parish of Gwennap.

Lanner has a large Wesleyan Methodist chapel. The former Bible Christian chapel is now used as the village hall (illustrated below) and the former Primitive Methodist chapel is now used as the silver band's rehearsal room.

== Geography ==
Lanner lies in a valley with Carn Marth hill rising 235 metres (771 ft) north of the village. Lanner Hill is west of the village and Tresavean Hill is to the south. The village is centred on a square and straddles the A393 Redruth to Falmouth road. The village slopes down the valley; the west end is known as Lanner Hill and the east end as Lanner Moor.

== Music ==
The village is well known for the "Lanner and District Silver Band" which is among the more prominent of the brass bands in Cornwall. The American countertenor Richard Jose was born in Lanner in 1862 and emigrated to the United States in 1876. Electronic musician Richard D. James (known as Aphex Twin) grew up in Lanner.

== Sport ==
Lanner RFU are a rugby union club, founded in 2014. They won promotion in their first season in league rugby and in 2016 came first in Cornwall 1 to win promotion to Tribute Cornwall/Devon. They then moved to Mt Ambrose and folded shortly after.

Unfortunately, the majority of the Villages Sports teams have now disbanded or moved elsewhere. The local village football team, Lanner AFC, which was reformed in 1981 is currently playing in the Trelawny League in West Cornwall and playing their home games on the former Tresavean mine site.

=== Cornish wrestling ===
There have been Cornish wrestling tournaments held in Lanner throughout the last 200 years. Tournaments have been held at the Commercial Inn and at Clovermead Field. Tit Wills, originally from Lanner was the middleweight Cornish wrestling champion of South Africa in 1906.

== Notable people ==
- Richard Jose (1862–1941), a Cornish-born American countertenor
- Richard David James (born 1971), known as Aphex Twin; musician, composer and DJ active in electronic music; brought up locally
