= Stithians =

Village and civil parish in Cornwall, England

Coordinates: 50.187°N 5.175°W

Stithians: Cornish: Stedhyans
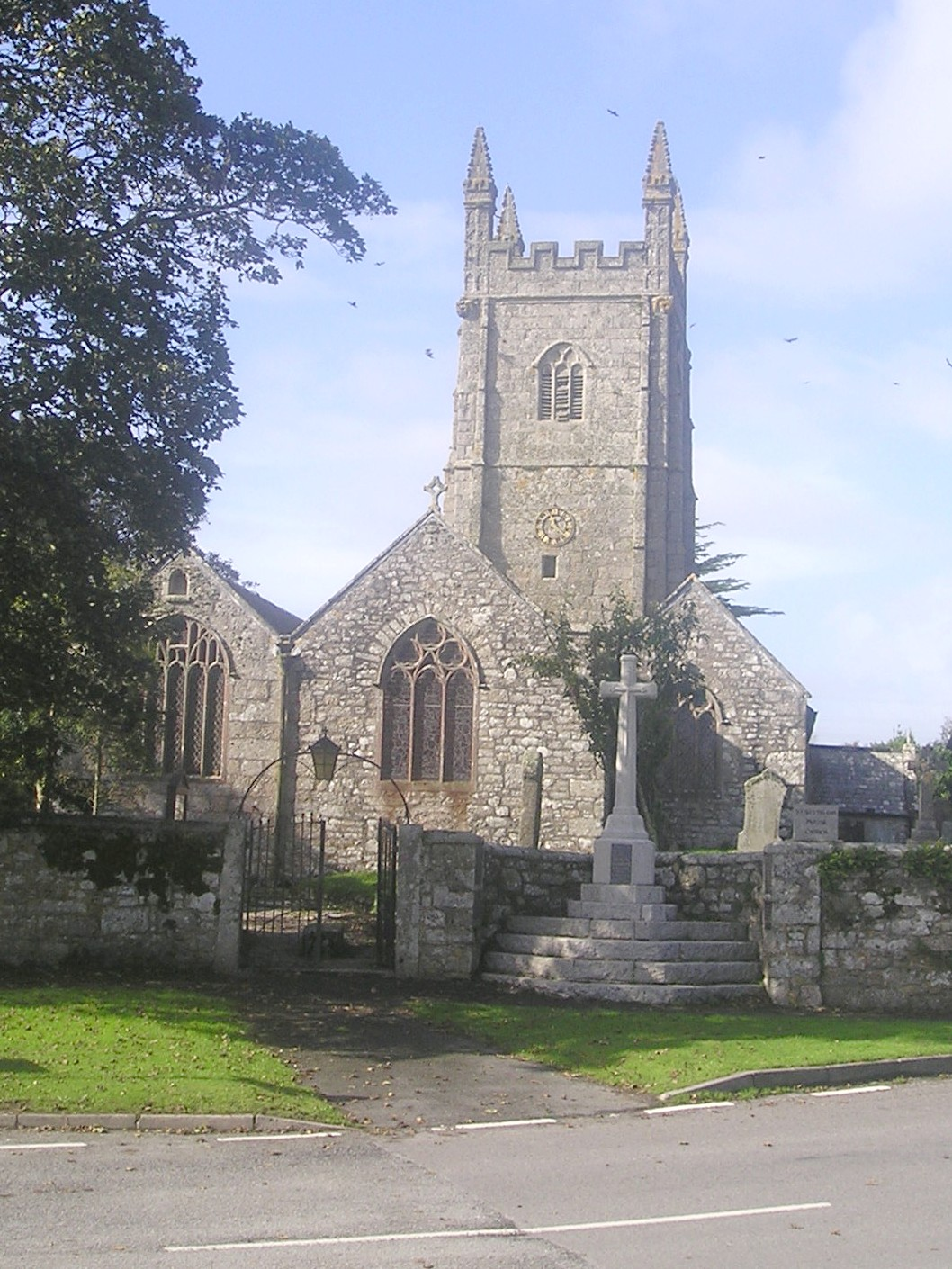
- Stithians Church
- Population: 2,101
- Civil parish: Stithians
- Shire county: Cornwall
- Region: South West
- Country: England
- Sovereign state: United Kingdom
- Post town: REDRUTH
- Postcode district: TR16
- Police: Devon and Cornwall
- Fire: Cornwall
- Ambulance: South Western

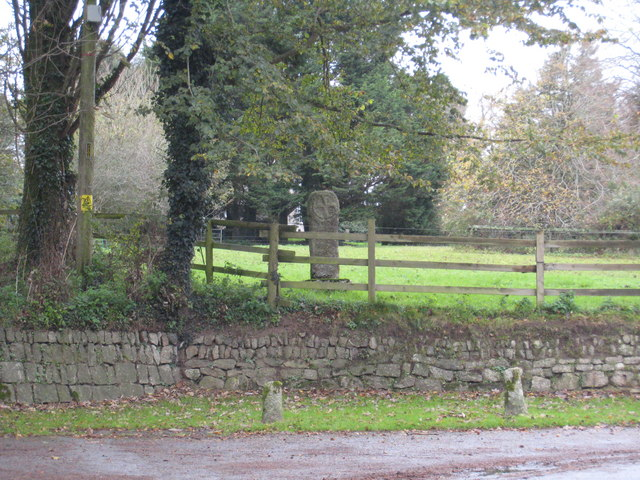
An ancient cross in the grounds of Tretheague House

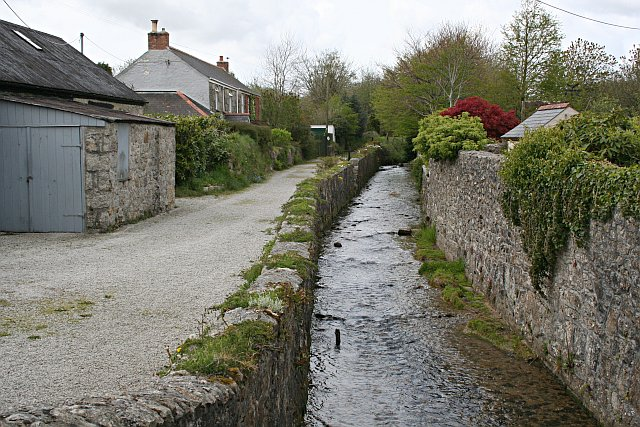
The River Kennall near Foundry, Stithians

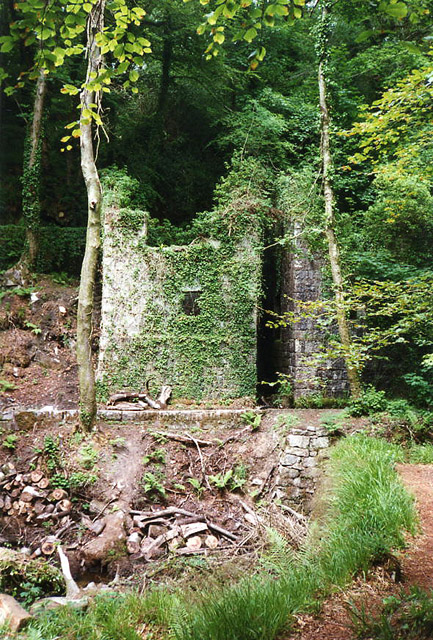
Ruins of Kennall Vale Gunpowder Works

Stithians (Cornish: Stedhyans), also known as St Stythians, is a village and civil parish in Cornwall, England, United Kingdom. It lies in the middle of the triangle bounded by Redruth, Helston and Falmouth. Its population (2001) is 2,004, increasing to 2,101 at the 2011 census An electoral ward in the same name also exists but stretches north to St Day. The population here also at the 2011 census was 5,023.

The parish is mainly agricultural, lying south of the Gwennap mining area and north of the quarrying areas of Rame and Longdowns. The River Kennall runs through the parish. In the 19th century, this river worked a flour mill and a number of gunpowder mills, machinery at a foundry, and a paper mill.

== Churches ==
=== Parish church ===
The parish church is dedicated to Saint Stythian, who has been hard to identify. References to the parish in 13th and 14th century records show various spellings: Stethyana, Stediana, Stedyan, Stediane and Stidianus. The Rev. Sabine Baring-Gould's Cornish Dedications (1906) makes a connection with Saint Etaine of Tumna in Ireland, while Rev Michael Warner (Vicar of Stithians 1983–1993) suggests Saint Stephen. The saint's feast day is the Sunday nearest to 10 July, and Stithians Show is held on the Monday following Feast Sunday.

There has been a church on the site since the 6th century, but the oldest part of the current church is 14th-century; and the imposing tower was added in the 15th century. The former ecclesiastical parish of Carnmenellis is now merged with Stithians parish. The church has a large two manual pipe organ.

=== Cornish crosses ===
There are four Cornish crosses in the parish; they are in the vicarage garden, and at Repper's Mill and Trevalis. The cross at Repper's Mill has a crude crucifixus figure on the front and a Latin cross on the back. There are two crosses at Trevalis: both have a crude crucifixus figure on the front and a Latin cross on the back. One of the crosses formerly stood at Hendra Hill near the churchtown but was moved to Trevalis about 1860. Another cross stands in the grounds of Tretheague House.

=== Methodist churches ===
John Wesley visited Stithians in 1744–50 and brought Methodism to the parish. The Hendra Wesleyan Chapel was built in 1815 and after a division among the members, the Penmennor United Methodist Free Church was built, in 1866, just a few yards away.. Hendra Chapel closed in 1976.

== Stithians Show ==
Stithians Show is one of the largest one-day agricultural shows in the UK: the show is held annually in July and the attendance is in excess of 20,000. Established in 1834, it has been held continuously since then (except for three years during World War I, five years during World War II, one year in 2001 due to the nationwide outbreak of foot and mouth disease and for 2 years in 2020 and 2021 due to the COVID-19 Pandemic). Until 1992, the Show was sited on fields in the centre of the village. Then the threat of rental increases as well as the show's increasing size encouraged the Agricultural Association to purchase its own land at Kennall Farm and establish a site there.

== Musical ensembles ==
Music has always played a large part in village life. St Stythians Band (formerly St Stythians Silver Band) was founded in 1928 and became very successful in competitions in the 1960s and 1970s; during the summer months it gives weekly concerts at the Gyllyngdune Gardens in Falmouth. St Stythians Male Voice Choir was formed in 1919, only to be closed in 1926; but it was reformed in 1947 and since then has thrived, performing concerts throughout Cornwall and further afield. Stithians Ladies Choir was formed in 1966 and quickly established a high reputation. The band and choirs have made a number of successful recordings.

== Philanthropy and recreation ==
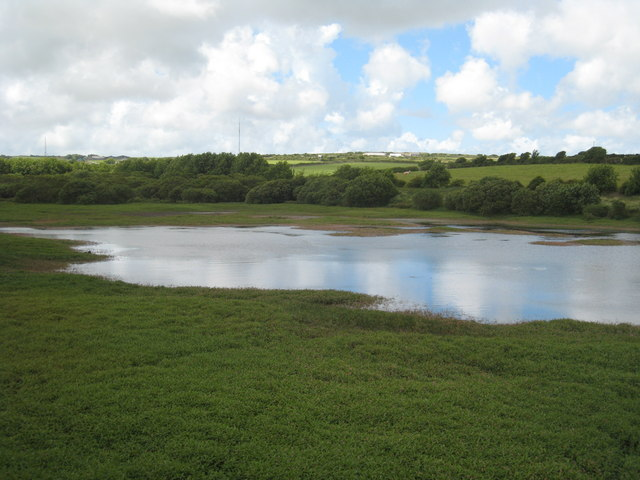
Stithians Reservoir

Albert Collins (1859–1937) from Stithians travelled to South Africa in 1880 with his friend William Mountstephens from Falmouth; there their building business prospered and they contributed to many charitable institutions. In 1934, Albert Collins paid for the Playing Field, opposite the school in the centre of the village, which is still enjoyed by the children of Stithians today. The men also set up a Trust Fund under the control of the Methodist Church in South Africa, which was used to build a school in Johannesburg; the school, known as St Stithians College, opened in 1953.

Stithians Dam was completed in 1964 to create a 270-acre (109 ha) reservoir to the west of the village, which supplies water to a large part of the west of Cornwall. It is a place for bird-watching, fishing and water sports. Stithians has a rugby football club (founded in 1890) and a football club running two teams in the Trelawny League.

== Cornish wrestling ==
There have been Cornish wrestling tournaments held in Stithians throughout the last 200 years. Tournaments have been held in the field adjoining the Seven Stars Inn, in a field next to the Hare and Hounds and near the foundry.

== Notable people ==
- James Martin (1821–1899), Australian industrialist and politician, was born here
- Henry Charles Seppings Wright (1849–1937) artist and war correspondent, was born here
- Richard Randall Knuckey (1842–1914), surveyor of the Australian Outback an overseer of telegraph lines, was born in the parish; he emigrated and settled in South Australia.
- The Rev. Reginald Frederick Moody (1872 - 1955) was Vicar of St. Stithians, Cornwall
- John Spargo (1876–1966), socialist and scholar, born in the parish but settled in the United States
- Ros Atkins (born 1974), BBC journalist grew up in the village
- Christopher Nigel Page, botanist
- Paul Spooner (born 1948), artist specialising in mechanical sculptures

== Twinning ==
- Pleurdud, Brittany, France
