= Gwennap =

Village and civil parish in Cornwall, England

Coordinates: 50.217°N 5.171°W

Gwennap: Cornish: Pluw Wenep
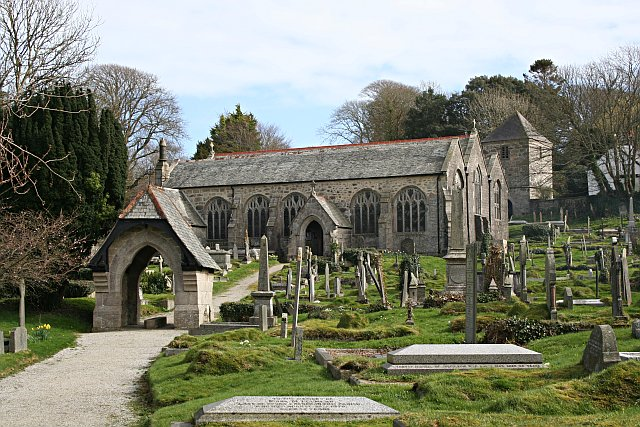
- Gwennap Parish Church

- Location within Cornwall
- Population: 1,602 (United Kingdom Census 2021 including Burncoose, Comford, Crofthandy, Cusgarne, Goon Gumpas and Hick's Mill)
- OS grid reference: SW741400
- Civil parish: Gwennap
- Unitary authority: Cornwall
- Ceremonial county: Cornwall
- Region: South West
- Country: England
- Sovereign state: United Kingdom
- Post town: REDRUTH
- Postcode district: TR16
- Dialling code: 01872
- Police: Devon and Cornwall
- Fire: Cornwall
- Ambulance: South Western
- UK Parliament: Truro and Falmouth

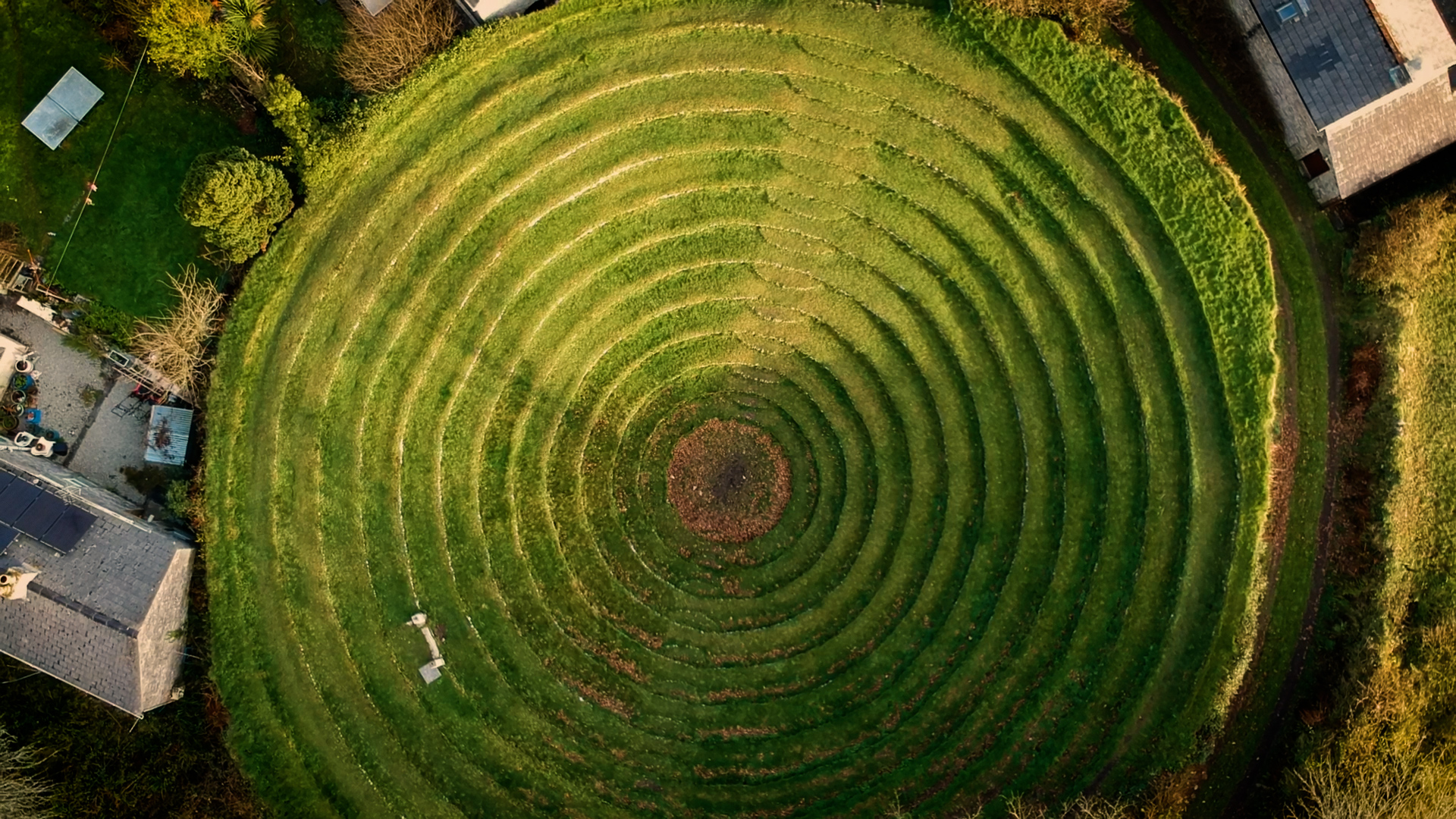
The rings at Gwennap Pit from above, taken in 2022.

Gwennap (Standard Written Form: Lannwenep (village), Pluw Wenep (parish)) is a village and civil parish in Cornwall, England, United Kingdom. It is about five miles (8 km) southeast of Redruth. The hamlets of Burncoose, Comford, Coombe, Crofthandy, Cusgarne, Fernsplatt, Frogpool, Hick's Mill, Tresamble and United Downs lie in the parish, as does Little Beside country house.

In the 18th and early 19th centuries Gwennap parish was the richest copper mining district in Cornwall, and was called the "richest square mile in the Old World". According to one estimate the mines of Gwennap produced tin and copper to the value of £10 million in the 19th century. It is near the course of the Great County Adit which was constructed to drain mines in the area including several of the local once-famous mines such as Consolidated Mines, Poldice mine and Wheal Busy. Today it forms part of area A6i (the Gwennap Mining District) of the Cornwall and West Devon Mining Landscape World Heritage Site.

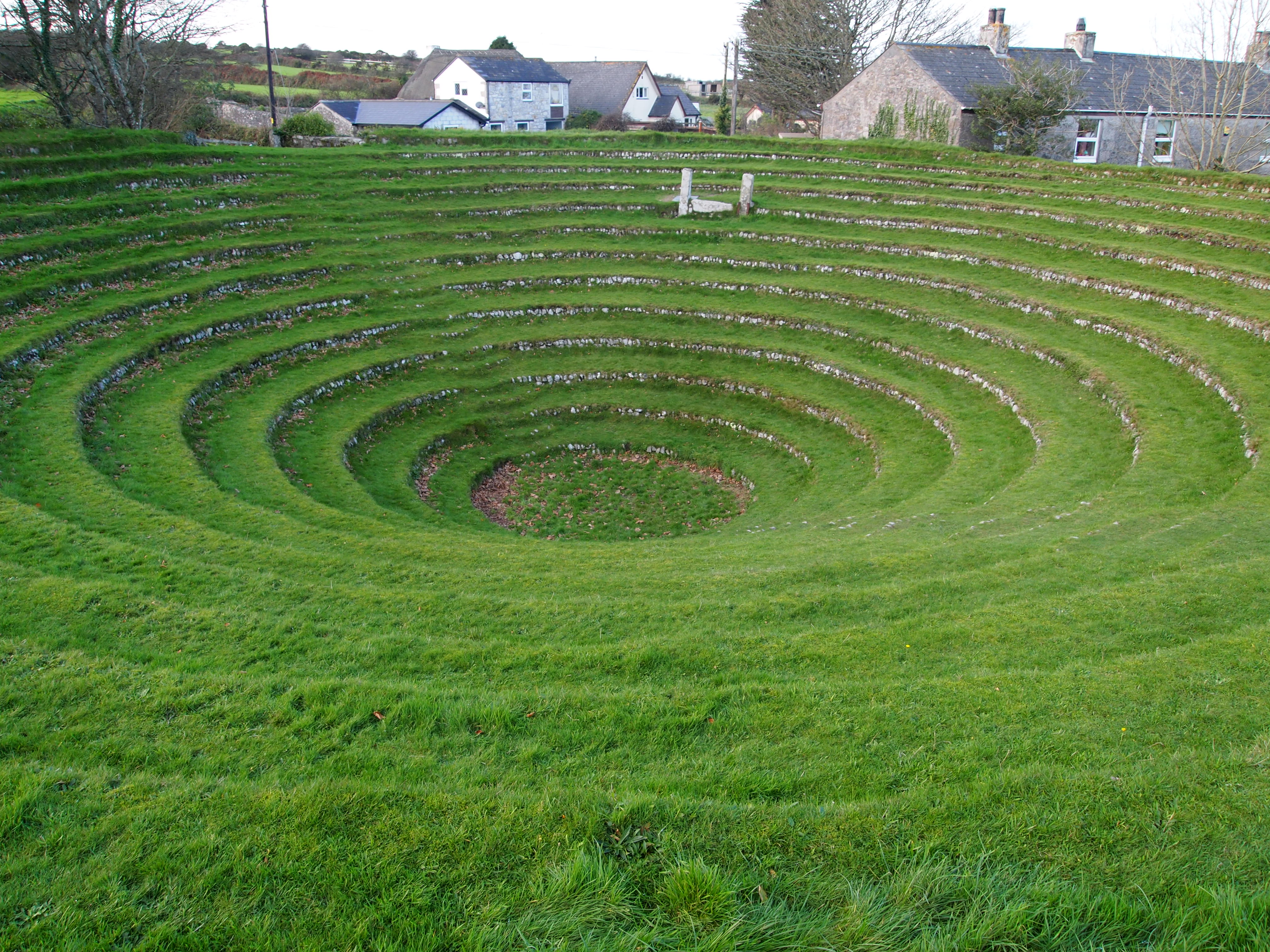
Gwennap Pit

It lends its name to Gwennap Pit, where John Wesley preached on 18 occasions between 1762 and 1789, although Gwennap Pit is about 1.7 miles (2.7 km) to the northwest, at the hamlet of Busveal near St Day. The pit was caused by mining subsidence in the mid-18th century. After Wesley's death the local people turned the pit into a regular circular shape with turf seats. The location of the pit has been described as being used for Cornish wrestling tournaments prior to its transformation.

== Church history ==
Gwennap Church is dedicated to St. Wenappa; in 1225 it was given to the chapter of Exeter by Lord William Briwere. The parish church is an old foundation, but was rebuilt in the 15th century because of population growth caused by mining and then thoroughly restored in the 19th century. The tower is detached. In 1882, following the removal of the centre gallery, which was said to be an eyesore, The Cornishman newspaper described the church as one of the prettiest in Cornwall. It was later described by Charles Henderson, as "few Cornish churches are less interesting than Gwennap".

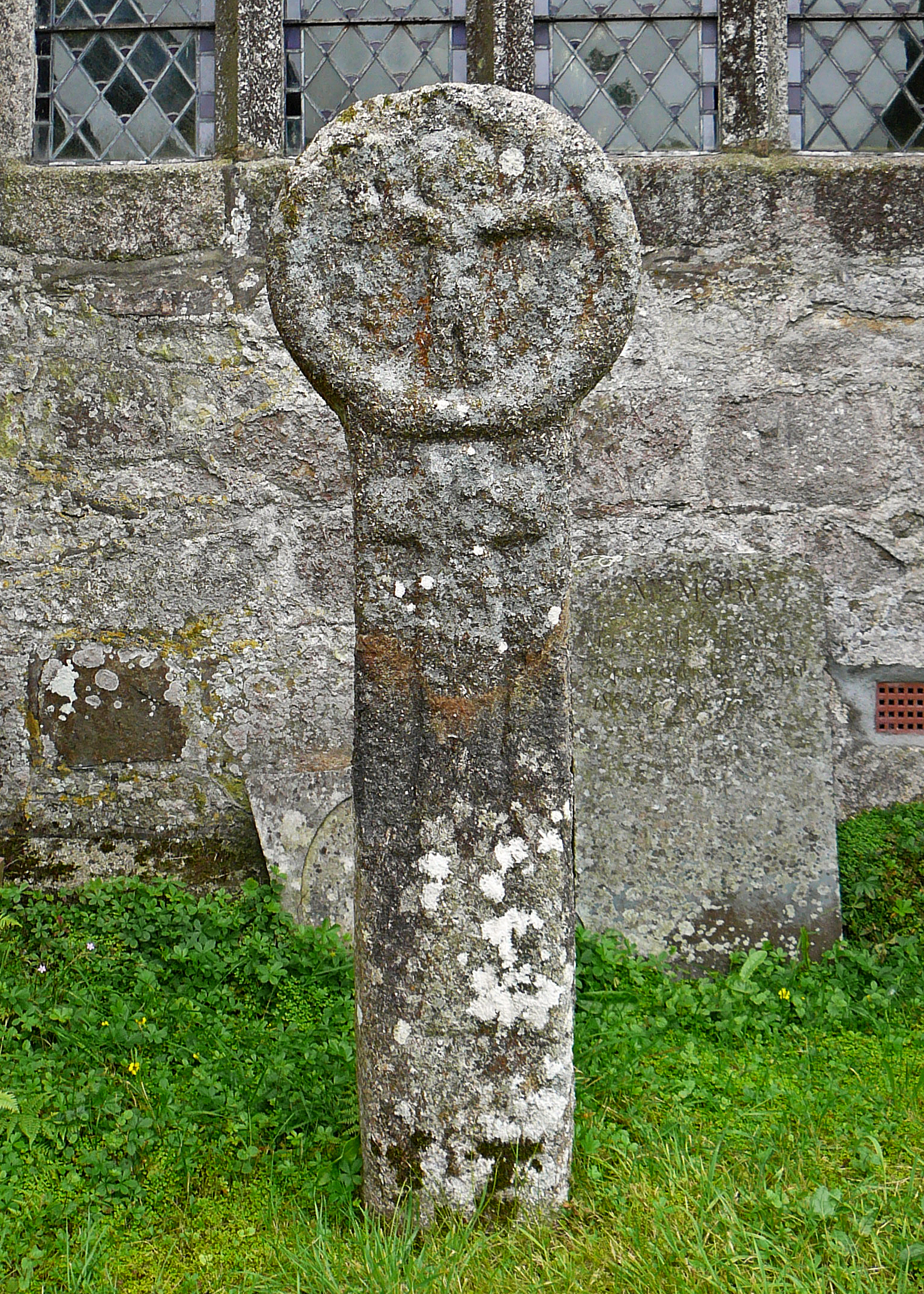
The cross in the churchyard

There is a Cornish cross in the churchyard, which was moved to the vicarage garden in the 1840s from Chapel Moor. It has a crude crucifix figure and a small Latin cross on the front and a large Latin cross on the back and is probably a fragment of a larger cross. There is also an ornamented cross shaft which was found in the church wall about 1860 and by mistake used again in the vestry foundations.

On 6 September 1762 John Wesley came to Gwennap and attracted a great crowd of tin miners. Unfortunately the day was very windy, and Wesley could not make himself heard. Someone suggested the shelter of Gwennap Pit, about 1.5 miles away, so the whole crowd walked there, and Wesley was able to preach his sermon. Wesley's Journal records, "The wind was so high that I could not stand at the usual place at the village of Gwennap, but a small distance away was a hollow capable of containing many thousands of people. I stood on one side of this amphitheatre towards the top, and with people beneath on all sides, I enlarged on those words in the gospel for the day, 'Blessed are the eyes which see the things that ye see....hear the things that ye hear.'"

He continued to use the pit for a total of 18 times: it is claimed that in 1773 he attracted a staggering 32,000 people. (Normally the pit provides comfortable seating for 2,000.) His final visit was in 1789.

There is now a seasonally-open visitor centre at Gwennap Pit, which was built in 1991.

== Copper and tin mining ==
Mining in Gwennap is an industry stretching back to prehistoric times when tin streaming in the Carnon Valley is believed to have occurred. In surrounding valleys stones of cassiterite (SnO_{2}) were washed downstream from outcropping lodes and trapped in the alluvial mud where they could be easily extracted. Later these outcropping tin lodes were worked by 'bounders' and the open workings (coffins) of these early miners are still partially visible at Penstruthal.

Early evidence of the antiquity of mining in Gwennap is recorded in the Stannary Roll of 1305–06 which notes that Johannes Margh of Trevarth sent thirty shipments of tin to Truro. In 1512 two local men were overheard quarrelling in Cornish about the theft of "tynne at Poldyth in Wennap". Tin raised in Gwennap was dressed and smelted locally. Early modern 'crazing mills' powered by water, such as that which existed at Penventon, were built to grind, and later stamp the tin ore. This released cassiterite, which was then smelted in local 'burning houses'. Demand for charcoal in the smelting process rapidly depleted Gwennap's ancient woodland, leaving a wild, moorland, landscape.

Deep exploitation of the tin lodes was not possible with the limited technology of the early modern period, as Cornish mines were wet due to the high rainfall of the area. De-watering workings at depth with 'rag and chain pumps,' leather bags, or 'kibbles' (metal buckets) were all ineffective. Deep lode mining was only made possible by two innovations, the first of which occurred in 1748, when John Williams of Scorrier House initiated the construction of the Great County Adit, a phenomenal feat of engineering, which drained mine workings through a system of adits. Over the next century this was extended from Poldice to include many other mines consisting of 63 miles (101 km) of tunnels in all.

The other remarkable invention was that of the steam engine, allowing mines to be de-watered to greater depths. As one of Britain's earliest industrial regions, Gwennap had, by the early 19th century become synonymous with steam technology, attracting Britain's top engineers, including Boulton & Watt and William Murdoch. Together with Cornish engineers such as Loam, Sims, Woolf, Hornblower and Richard Trevithick, these men enabled the pumping engine to perform beyond the expectations of the time.

A great many of these pumps and engines were installed by Richard Michell, Mine Engineer (1748–1836) of Gwennap and his descendants. In November 1806 he and four others, namely Mine Captains John Martin, John Dennis, W. Davey and T. Trestrail, met at Busveal and agreed to repair Gwennap Pit, or rather reconstruct the amphitheatre in respect to and in memory of John Wesley. It opened and had preaching in it on 18 June 1807. His eldest son, Francis (1780–1860) followed in his fathers footsteps expanding the practice to include steam engine drives for corn mills and a small workshop and foundry in Redruth. He also patented a boiler gauge. His only son, Francis William Michell (1828–1901), was responsible for the installation of over one hundred of these pumps and engines at numerous mines. With his cousin Richard Henry Michell (1817–1894), he went into partnership building a dredge and entering into a contract to dredge a dock at Cardiff. The family continued to be involved in the mining industry well into the 20th century.

Such innovations coincided with an increased national demand for copper, needed in the brass parts for the machinery of the Industrial Revolution. By 1779 copper was ousting tin as the main mineral extracted, but it was the period from 1815 to 1840 which was the heyday of mining in Gwennap. This era saw the rise of huge mining enterprises including the Consolidated, United, and Tresavean Mines. Consolidated yielded almost 300,000 tons of copper between 1819 and 1840 which sold for over £2 million. Gwennap, the "Copper Kingdom" was then the richest known mineralised area in the world.

Mining rapidly transformed the landscape. Consolidated Mines alone had nineteen engine houses for pumping, winding, and crushing: the red waste rock from deep underground lay strewn about the moors, and the valleys constantly echoed to the roar of the 'stamps'. Another visible sign of industrialisation was the construction of mineral tramways, which transported copper ore and Welsh coal to and from coastal ports more efficiently than packs of mules. In 1809 a horse-drawn tramway was constructed between Portreath and Scorrier which was later extended to Poldice and Crofthandy. This was followed by the building of the Redruth-Chasewater Railway in 1824 running from Pedn-an-Drea and Wheal Buller, Redruth, to Devoran.

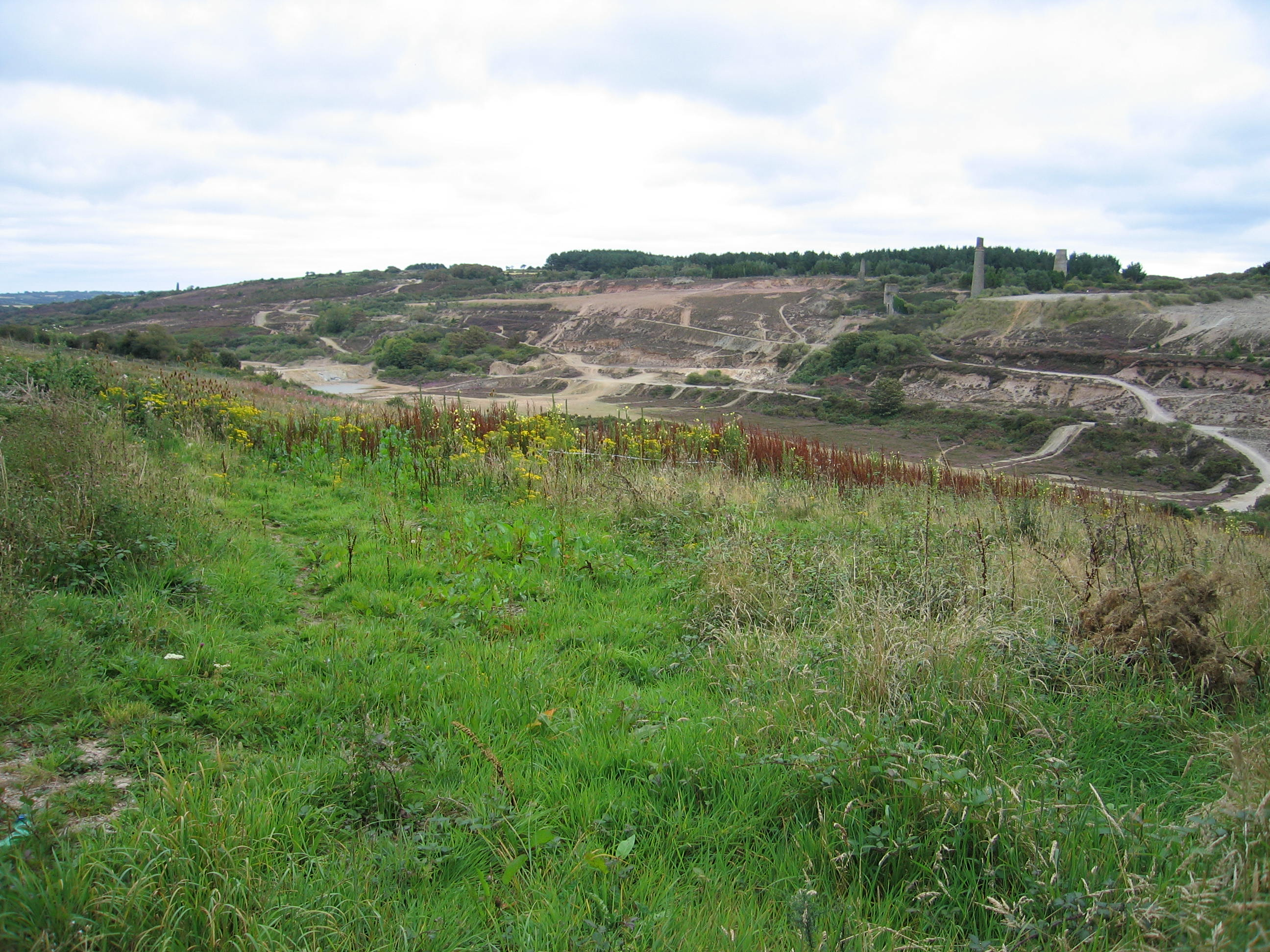
View of the now defunct Wheal Unity mine to the east of St Day. This image shows the badly scarred landscape of the area.

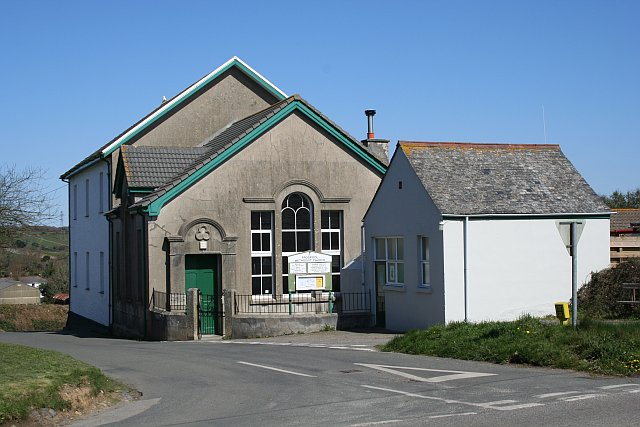
Frogpool Methodist Church

Mining reached its technical apogee in Gwennap in the 1840s with the installation of the first ever man engine in Britain at Tresavean Mine; but the nature of the area's geology, which had bestowed such wealth, eventually proved its downfall. In the nearby Camborne-Redruth district, rich deposits of tin were found below the copper. In Gwennap no such deposits were found and when low prices caused the collapse of the copper market in the 1860s, many mines were forced to close or amalgamate. Consolidated and United were incorporated into Clifford Amalgamated mine. Many of the mines that continued or went over to tin production could not survive the rising cost of coal and the fluctuations of mineral prices, causing a second wave of closures in the mid-1870s.

Few mines survived the troubled times of the late 19th century, but Tresavean was one success story. Brought back to life as a tin mine in 1908, it was the second deepest mine in Cornwall at 2,660 feet (810 m) when it closed in 1928. Other mines that were resurrected in the 20th century include Wheal Gorland, worked for tungsten before the World War I, Wheal Busy, Mount Wellington, Whiteworks, Poldice, Parc an Chy, and Wheal Jane. The last mine to work commercially was South Crofty Mine at Pool near Redruth which ceased operation in March 1998 bringing to a close over 2,000 years of mining in the Gwennap area.

== Cornish wrestling ==
There were Cornish wrestling tournaments, for prizes, held in Gwennap Pit and at the Gwennap Graveyard.

== Notable people ==
- John Lawn (1840–1905), New Zealand gold miner
- Thomas Curnow (1855–1922), expatriate schoolteacher who foiled a plan by Australian outlaw Ned Kelly
- John Verran (1856–1932), miner, Premier of South Australia
