= Stone crosses in Cornwall =

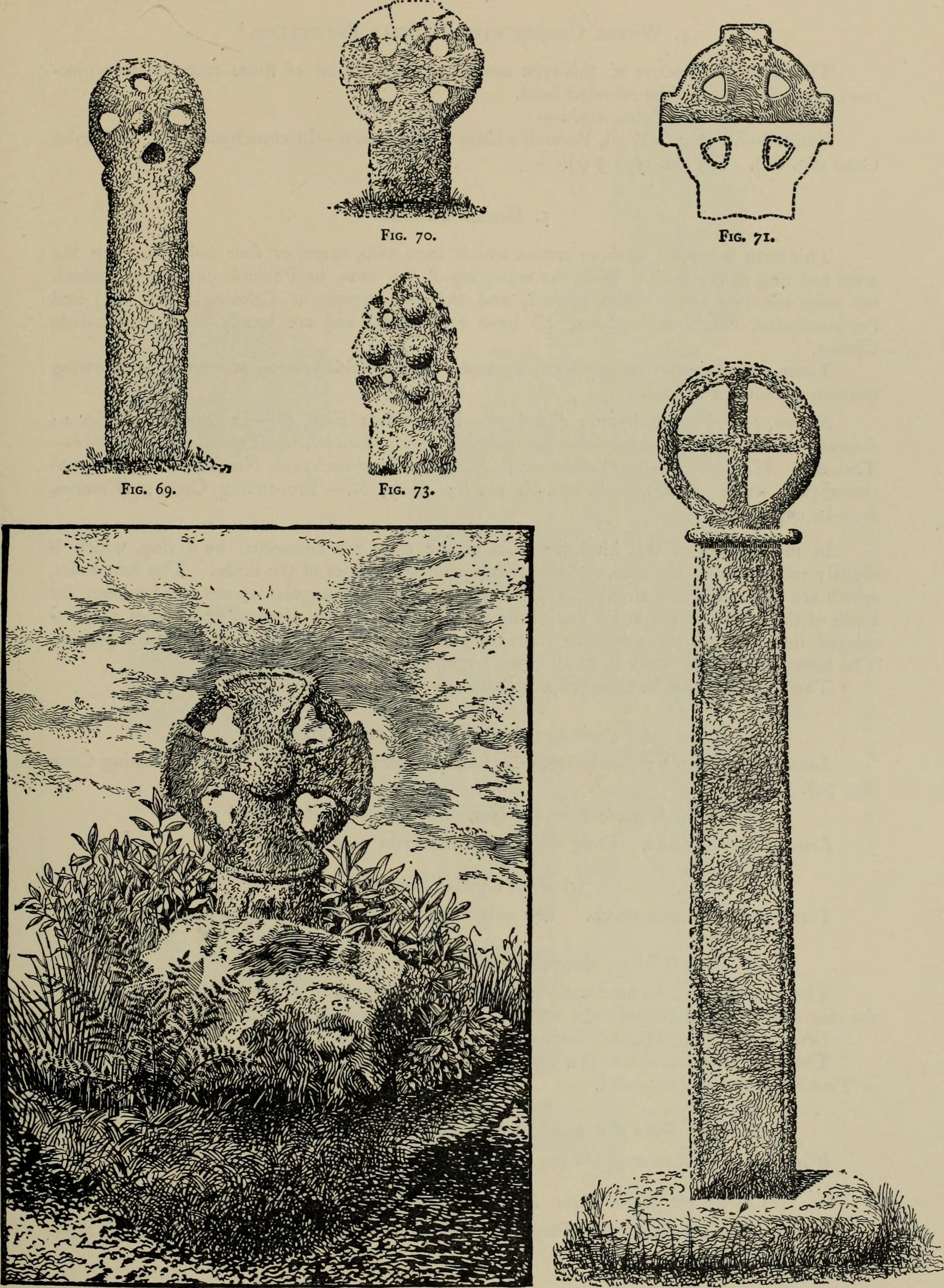
Fig. 1: some stone crosses in Cornwall

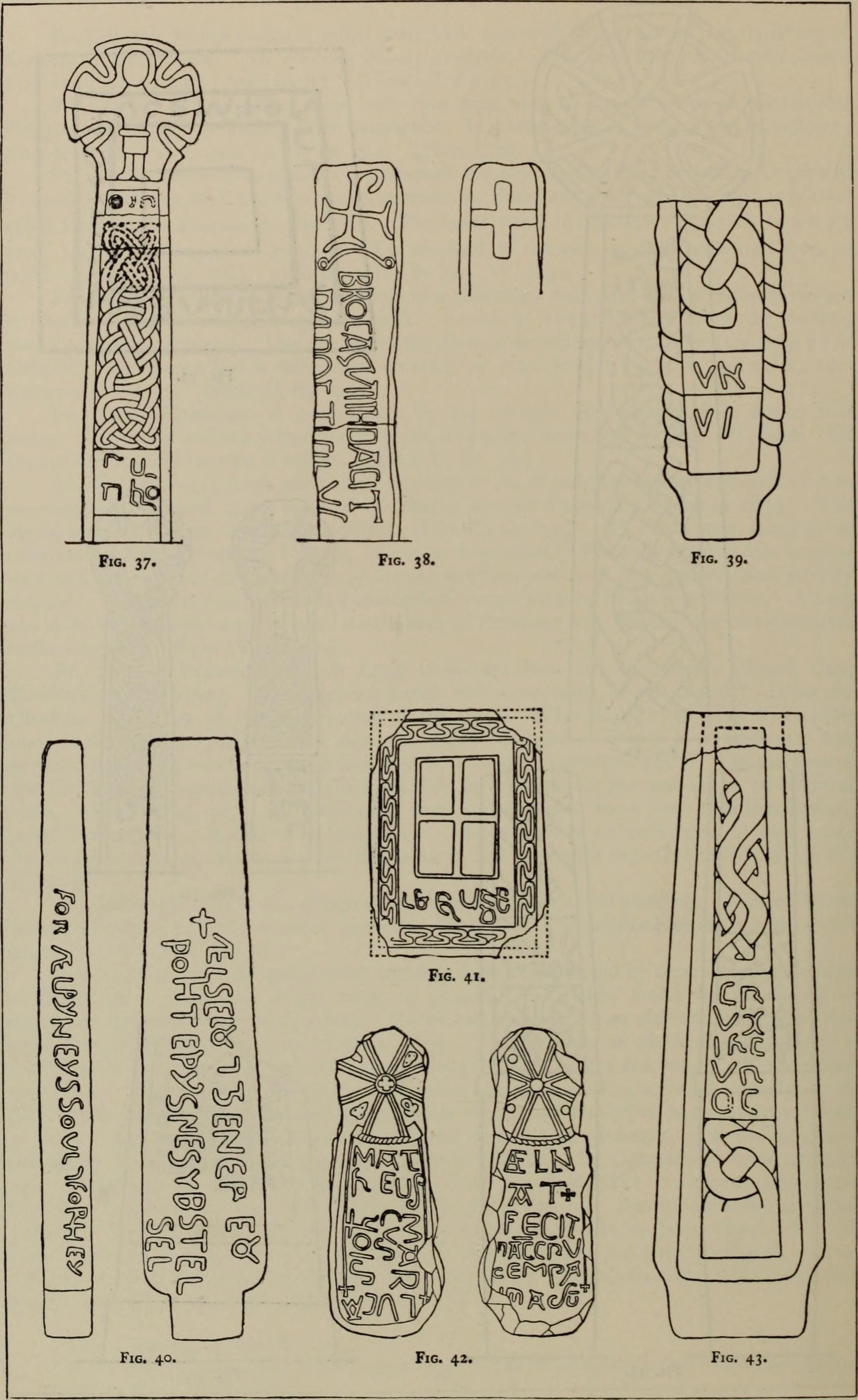
Fig. 2: some more stone crosses

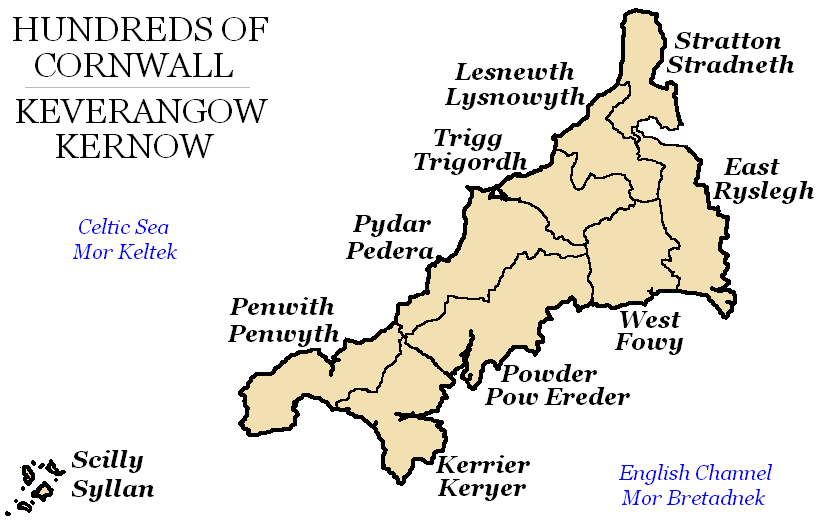
The hundreds of Cornwall

Wayside crosses and Celtic inscribed stones are found in Cornwall in large numbers; the inscribed stones (about 40 in number) are thought to be earlier in date than the crosses and are a product of Celtic Christian society. It is likely that the crosses represent a development from the inscribed stones but nothing is certain about the dating of them. In the late Middle Ages it is likely that their erection was very common and they occur in locations of various types, e.g. by the wayside, in churchyards, and in moorlands. Those by roadsides and on moorlands were doubtless intended as route markings. A few may have served as boundary stones, and others like the wayside shrines found in Catholic European countries. Crosses to which inscriptions have been added must have been memorial stones. According to W. G. V. Balchin "The crosses are either plain or ornamented, invariably carved in granite, and the great majority are of the wheel-headed Celtic type." Their distribution shows a greater concentration in west Cornwall and a gradual diminution further east and further north. In the extreme northeast none are found because it had been settled by West Saxons. The cross in Perran Sands has been dated by Charles Henderson as before 960 AD; that in Morrab Gardens, Penzance, has been dated by R. A. S. Macalister as before 924 AD; and the Doniert Stone is thought to be a memorial to King Dumgarth (died 878).

Celtic art is found in Cornwall, often in the form of stone crosses of various types. Cornwall boasts the highest density of traditional 'Celtic crosses' of any nation (some 400). Charles Henderson reported in 1930 that there were 390 ancient crosses and in the next forty years a number of others have come to light. In the 1890s Arthur G. Langdon collected as much information as he could about these crosses (Old Cornish Crosses; Joseph Pollard, Truro, 1896) and one hundred years later Andrew G. Langdon has done a survey in the form of five volumes of Stone Crosses in Cornwall, each volume covering a region (e.g. Mid Cornwall) which the Federation of Old Cornwall Societies has published.

Similar crosses are also found on Dartmoor in Devon.

In modern times many crosses were erected as war memorials and to celebrate events such as the millennium. "Here is an example of continuity in cultural traits extending over many generations: for we can look beyond the medieval cross to the inscribed stone and even farther back to the prehistoric mênhir, and yet bring the custom right up-to-date with the twentieth-century war memorial."—W. G. V. Balchin (1954).

"The Celtic crosses found in their hundreds at the roadside, in churchyards, towns and in the open landscape ... are the most pervasive and memorable evidence of the presence of Christianity across medieval Cornwall. They were long considered to be pre-Conquest but it is now believed that they began to be erected in the 9th century with the majority dating between then and the 13th century, though documentary evidence suggests that some were still being put up as late as the mid 15th century. Two of the best pre-Conquest examples are St Piran's Cross near St Piran's Oratory, mentioned in a charter of 960, and King Doniert's Stone (a cross shaft) near St Cleer commemorating Doniert's death in 875. Most crosses are of granite and they are especially numerous ... in the Cardinham area and ... around Sancreed, with smaller clusters in Wendron and Lanivet. The most distinctive is the Celtic wheel-head design, which has many variants, but there are significant numbers of holed crosses that are pierced right through, and numerous Latin crosses. The most elaborate are the larger and more decorated churchyard crosses ... Their purpose is varied: the most common is the wayside cross to mark directions, and there are also a large number of boundary crosses... Some are memorial crosses and a few are true village or market crosses, though some of the latter have been adapted from wayside crosses. In situ crosses are rare, with many rediscovered, relocated and re-erected since the later 19th century, and more still coming to light today."--Peter Beacham.

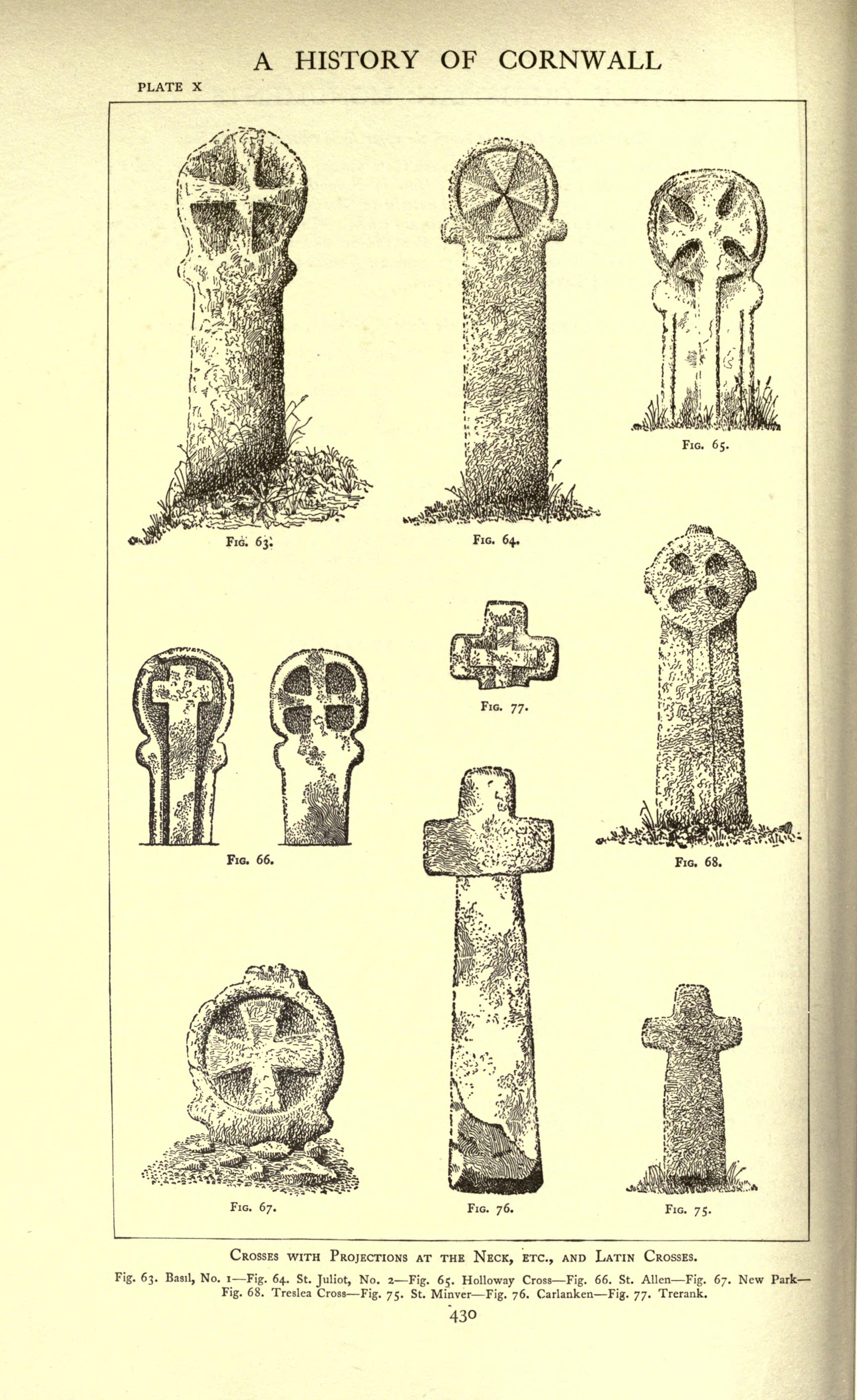
Fig. 3: some more stone crosses

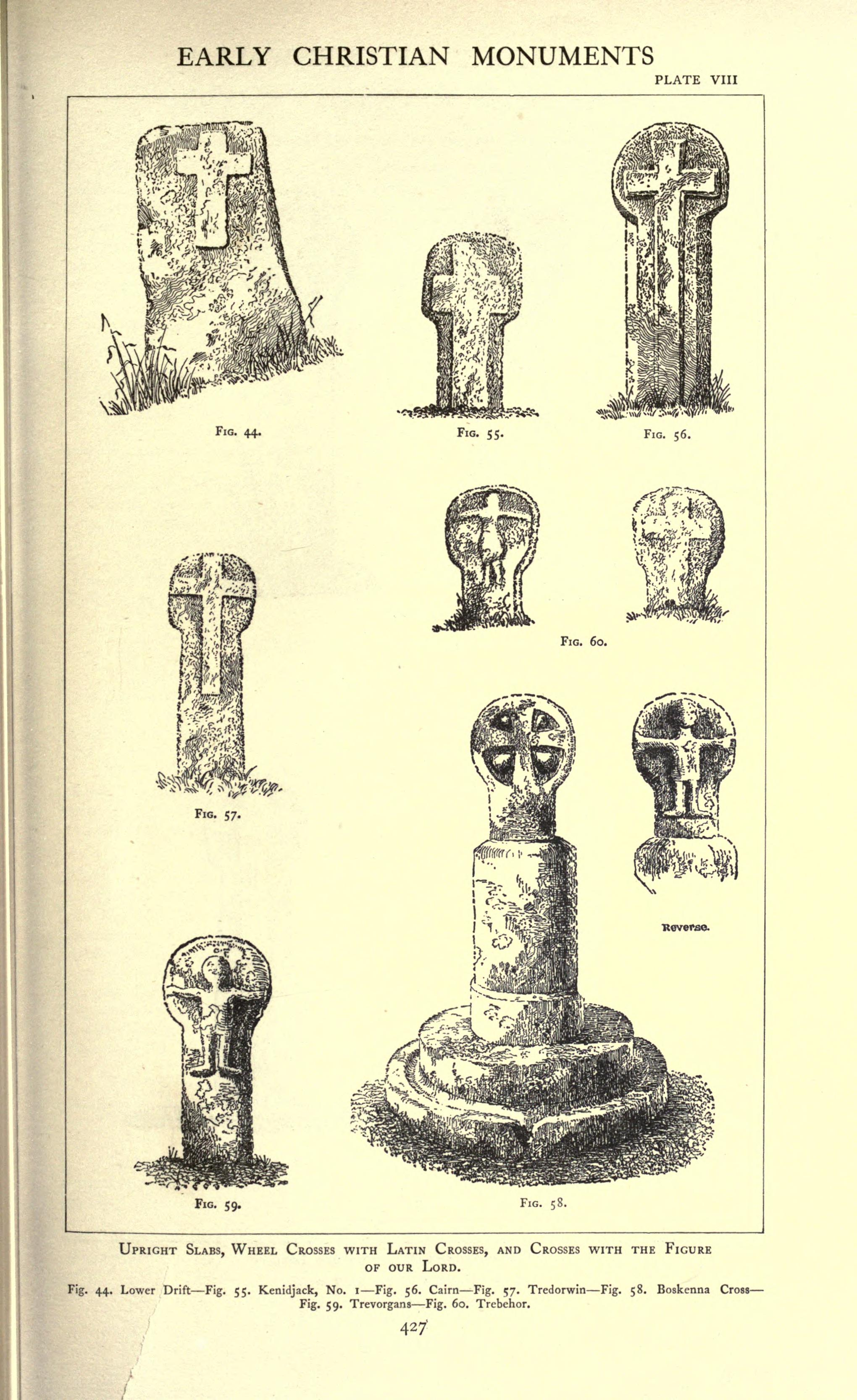
Fig. 4: some more stone crosses

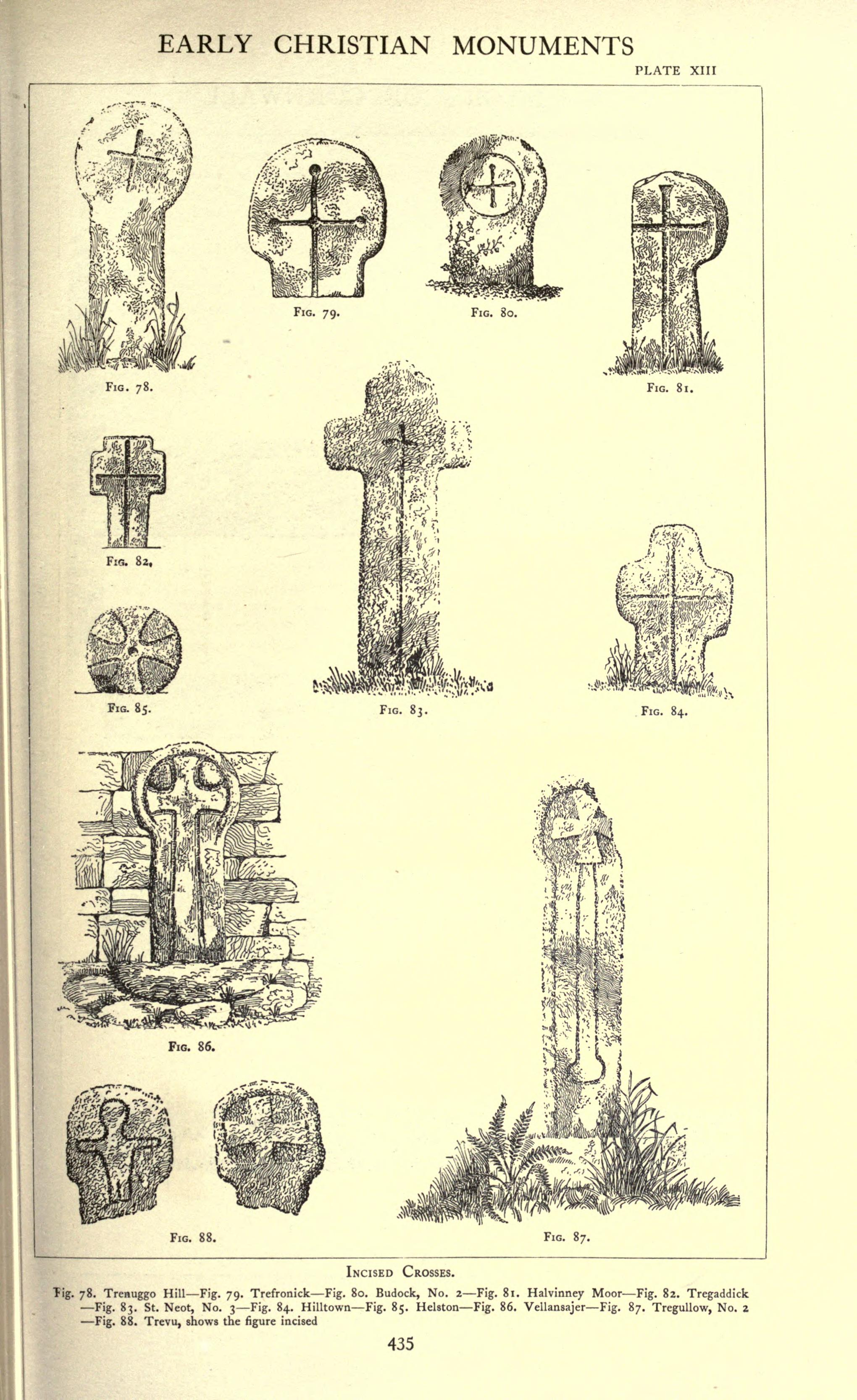
Fig. 5: some more stone crosses

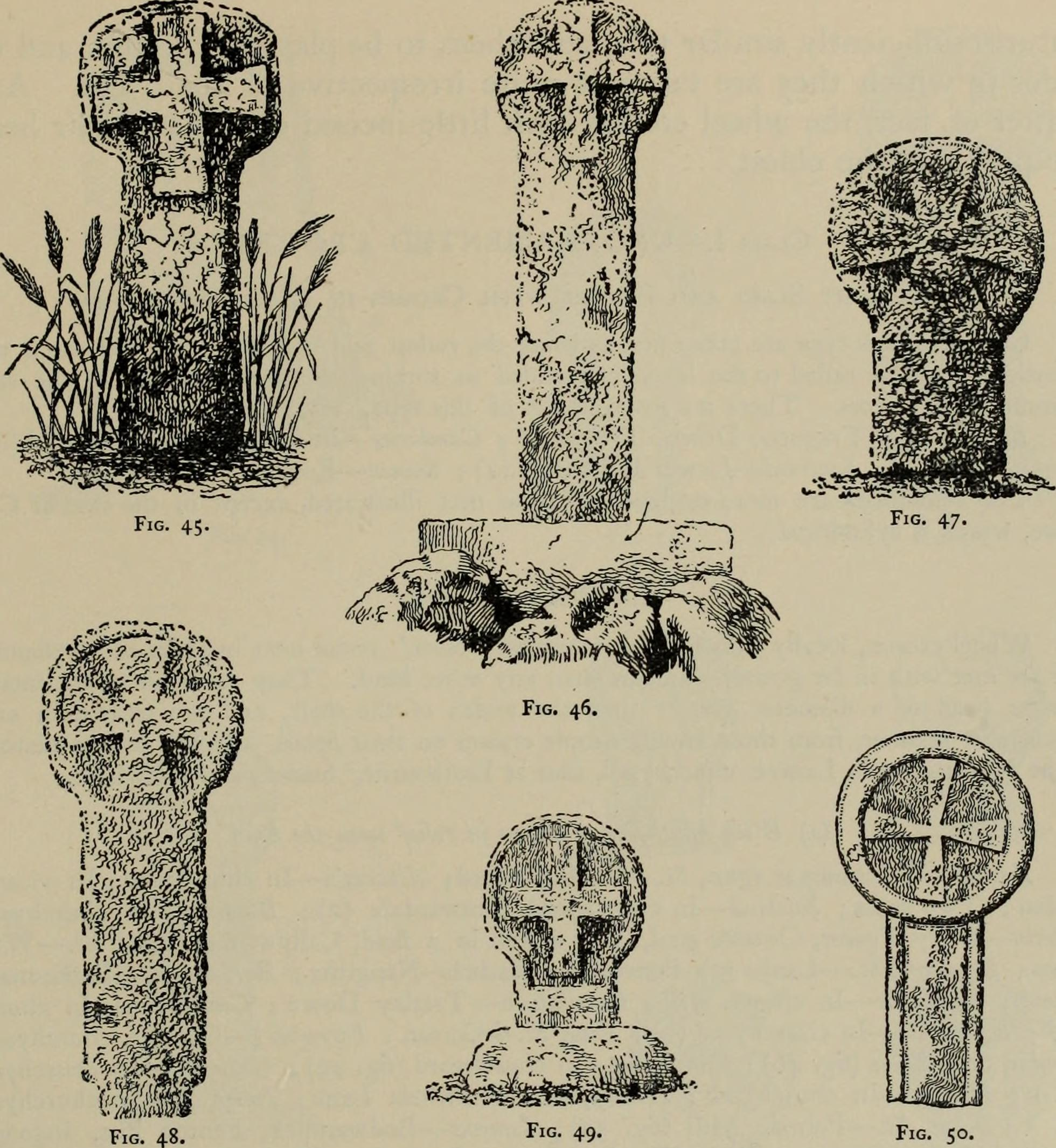
Fig, 6: some more stone crosses

== Crosses in East hundred ==
Parishes C - Q

In the churchyard of Callington there is a Gothic lantern cross. It was first mentioned by the historian William Borlase in 1752. Each of the four faces of the cross head features a carved figure beneath an ogee arch. The heads of these figures have been chiselled off, no doubt in the Commonwealth period.

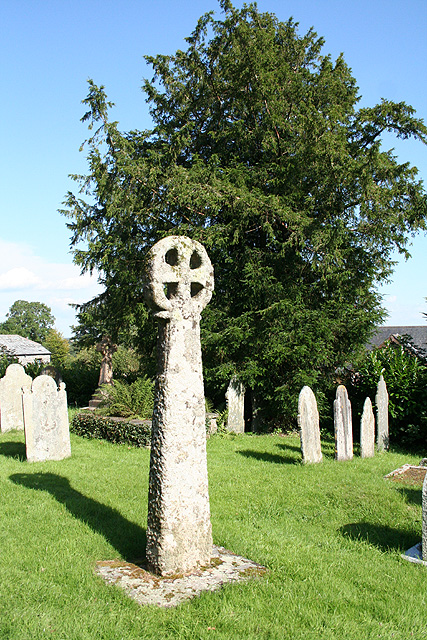
Fig. a1: the cross in the churchyard of Laneast

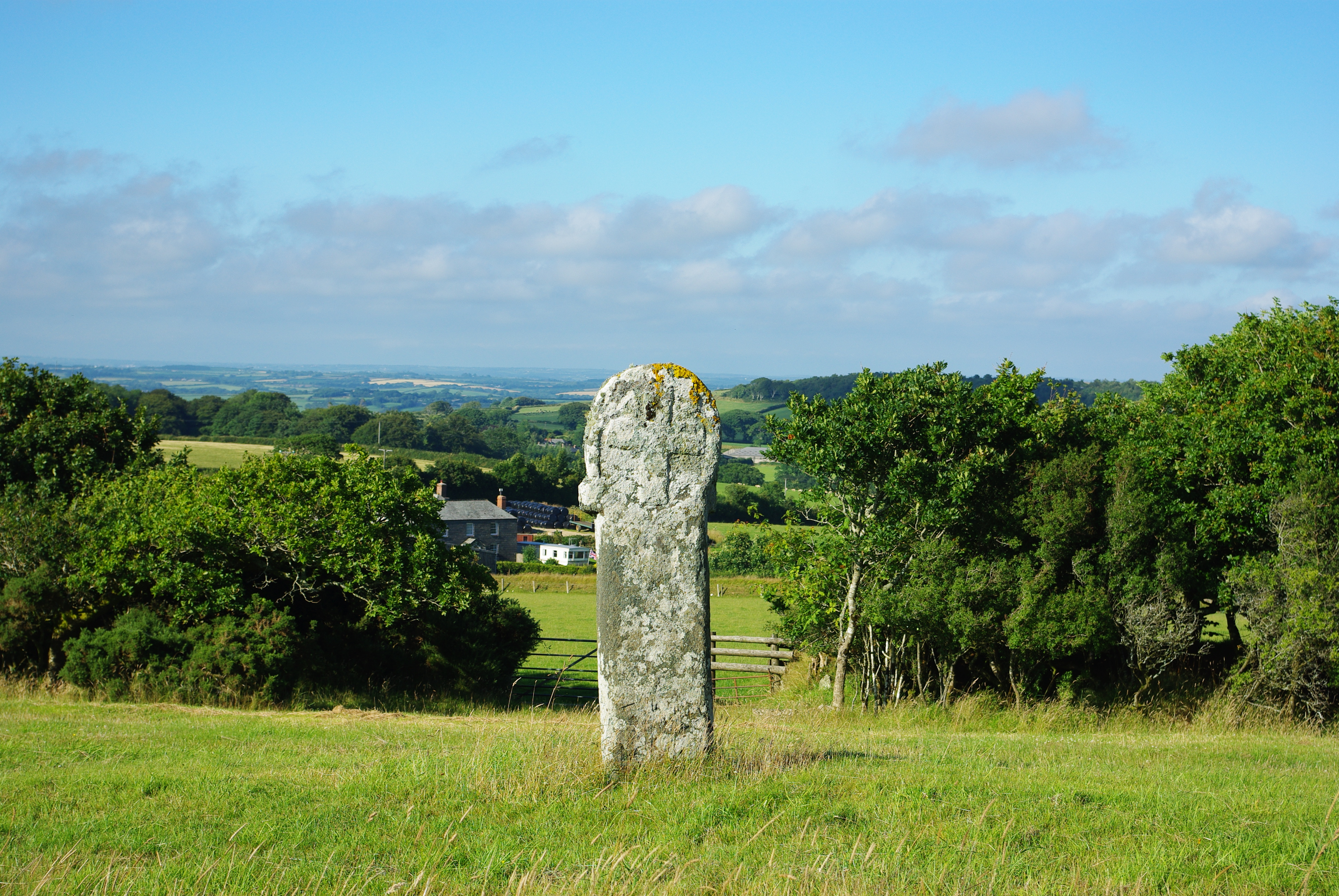
Fig. a2: the cross on Laneast Down

In the churchyard of Laneast is a four-holed Cornish cross (fig. a1) which was found in 1952 buried in the churchyard. The lower part of the shaft and the base were made in 1954. There is a Cornish cross on Laneast Down (fig. a2). It is unusual in being made of Polyphant stone rather than granite; the two sides of the head are elliptical and have Latin crosses.

There is a Cornish cross at Treniffle in the parish of Lawhitton; it was found built into an old barn at Tregada Farm about 1883 and then placed in her garden by Mrs. Morshead.

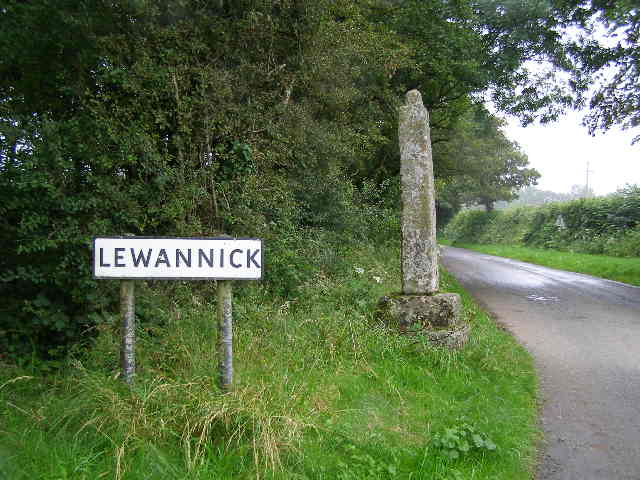
Fig. a3: a cross shaft by the roadside near Lewannick

Arthur Langdon (1896) records two Cornish crosses in the parish of Lewannick: one is Holloway Cross at a road junction one and half miles north of the churchtown; the other is a cross head in the grounds of a house called Trelaske.

Arthur Langdon (1896) records a Cornish cross and a cross base at North Coombe; and another cross base at Sturt's Corner, both in the parish of Linkinhorne. Andrew Langdon (1996) records the cross at Northcoombe (it was set up on a stone in 1908).

A stone wayside cross was found at Hendra Farm, Menheniot, in the early 1960s. It had been buried upside down in the ground to form a gatepost. In 1991 the two separate pieces of the cross were repaired and erected on a new base near Hendra farmhouse.

Arthur Langdon (1896) recorded a Cornish cross in the grounds of Trebartha Hall, North Hill; it had been found built into the gable of a nearby cottage.

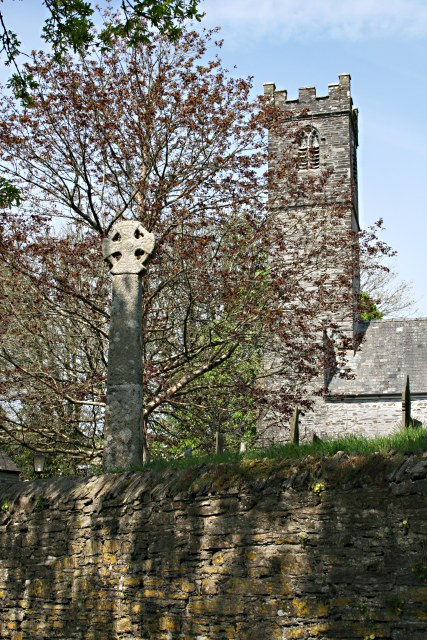
Fig. a4: the cross in Quethiock churchyard

There is a Cornish cross in the churchyard of Quethiock. An account of its discovery was published in the Journal of the Royal Institution of Cornwall; vol. 7, 1882. Arthur Langdon said of it: "Undoubtedly this is a magnificent monument, and in regard to height is, with the exception of the cross in Mylor churchyard, since discovered, the tallest in Cornwall".

Parishes S - T

There is a Cornish cross at Carracawn in the parish of St Germans.

There are two stone crosses in the churchyard of St Ive. One is a Latin wayside cross which was found in use as a gatepost in one of the glebe fields near the churchyard in 1932. A month later it was erected in its present position. The other is an incomplete cross which was found in the vicarage garden in 1965. In 1982 it was erected in the churchyard.

In the churchyard of St Stephens-by-Saltash is a Gothic lantern cross. This cross was first recorded by Joseph Polsue in 1872; it stood for many years in the vicarage garden. In the 1970s it was resited in the churchyard. Andrew Langdon is of the opinion that it originally stood in the churchyard. There is a Cornish cross at a road junction between the village of Trematon and the castle.

There is a Cornish cross in the churchyard of St Thomas-by-Launceston, found when the church was rebuilt in 1869–70.

A stone cross stands by the side of the road at Crafthole, Sheviock. It was first recorded in 1858 as a cross without a base. By 1896 it was standing on a base; in the 1950s it was removed to the side of the road from its previous site in the middle. Crafthole was granted a weekly market in 1315; it has been suggested that this cross was the market cross.

There is a Cornish cross in the churchyard of Tresmeer. According to Arthur Langdon it was formerly in the churchyard of Laneast. He observed it in the 1890s placed at the head of the grave of a late vicar of Tresmeer.

== Crosses in Kerrier hundred ==
Parishes B - L

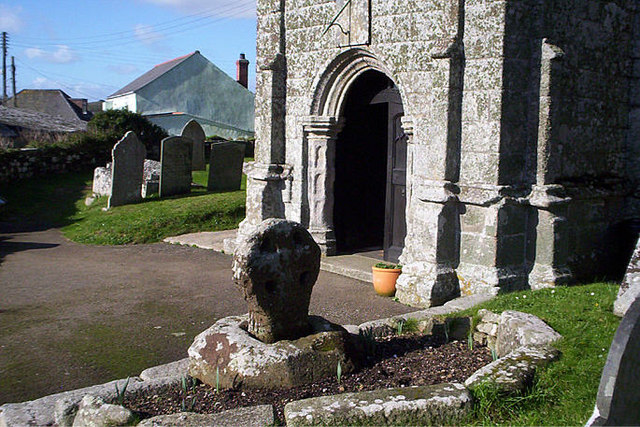
Fig. b1: the cross head at Breage

In the churchyard of Breage there is an unusual Hiberno-Saxon cross head. There is a Cornish cross in the churchyard at Godolphin Cross. In 1886 it was moved to the churchyard having been found in use as a gatepost on the Chytodden estate.

There are two Cornish crosses (illustrated Fig. b6) in the parish of Budock; both are in the churchyard. There is also a cross base at Nangitha.

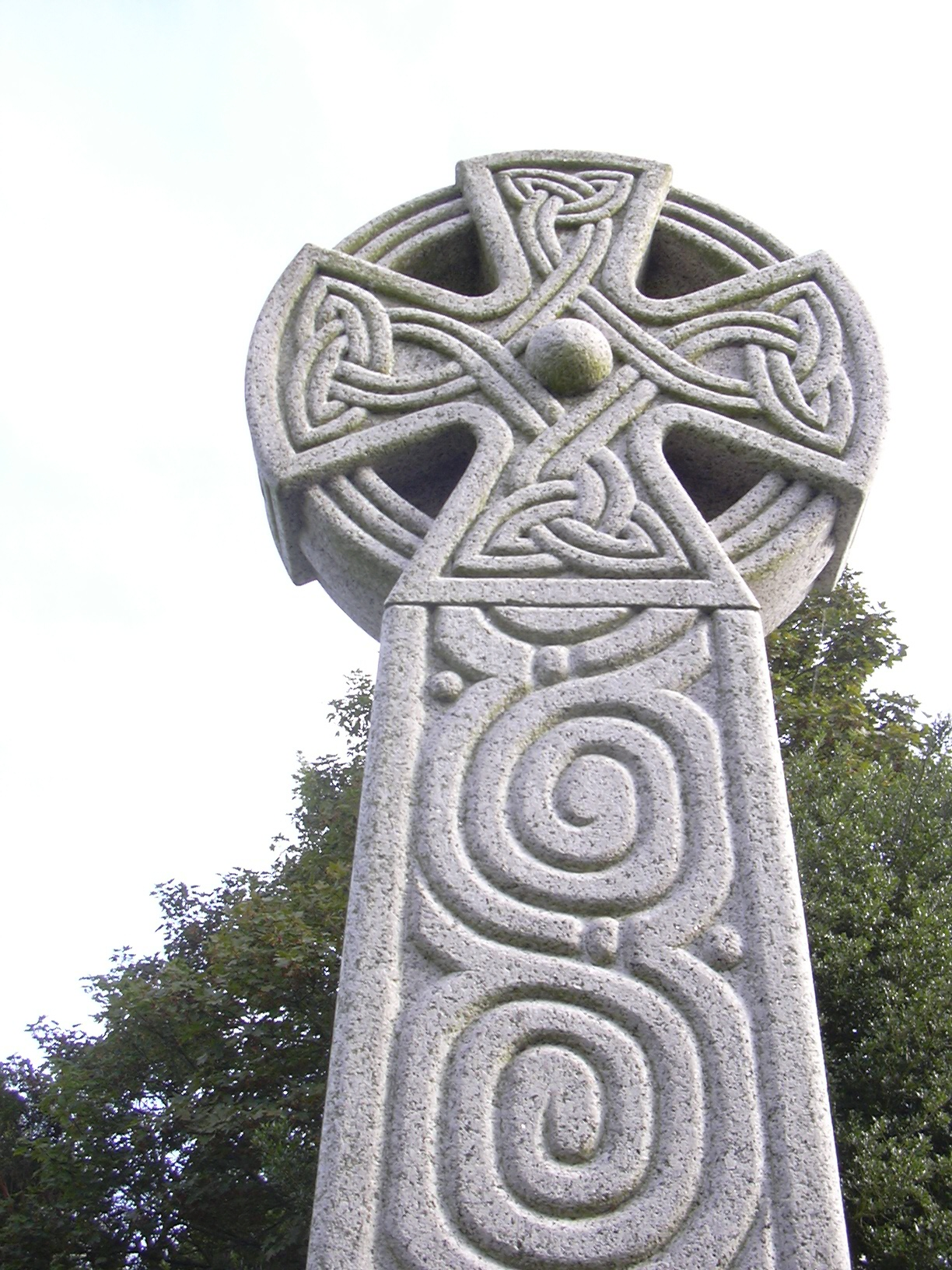
Fig. b2: the war memorial of Constantine, Kerrier

Andrew Langdon (1999) lists twelve stone crosses, or parts of crosses located in the parish of Constantine. One of these was carved and erected in 1991. Several have been transferred from other sites. The stone cross at the cross-roads in High Cross was found in 1992 and re-erected nearby at the crossroad, in April 2000. Arthur Langdon (1896) recorded six Cornish crosses in the parish; in the churchyard, at Bosvathick, at Merthen, at Nanjarrow, at Trevease and at Trewardreva (illustrated Fig. b8). In 1993 a medieval stone cross was found built into a collapsing Cornish hedge at the junction of the road from Constantine to Penryn and the road from Mawnan Smith (illustrated Fig. b9).

There is a Cornish cross (illustrated Fig. b10) in the churchyard of Cury; it is probably the old churchyard cross but was found in a ditch nearby in 1849 and set up in its present position.

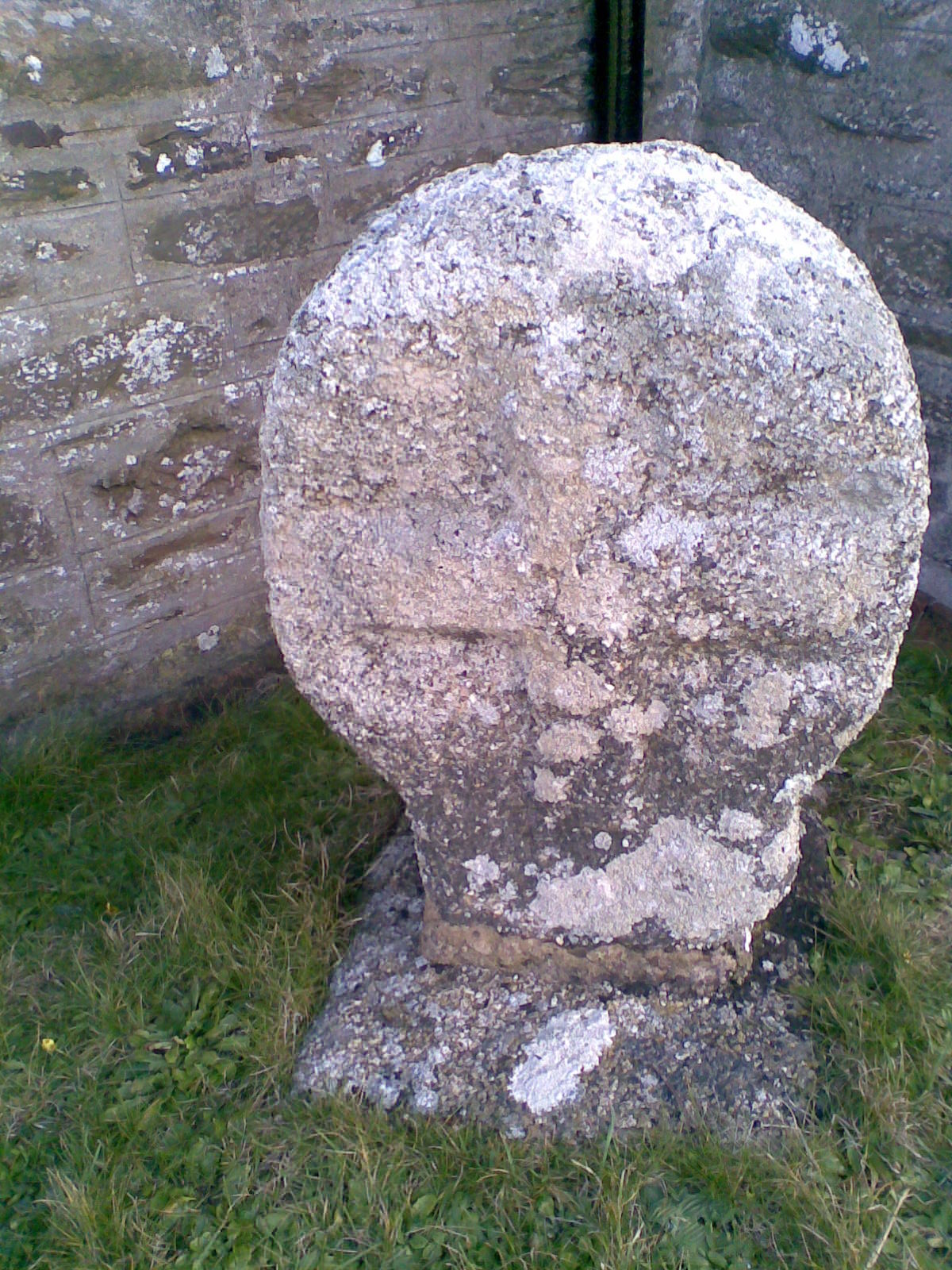
Fig. b3: a cross in Gunwalloe churchyard

The small cross in Gunwalloe churchyard was found in the 19th century and taken to Penrose. At a later date it was placed in the churchyard.

There is a Cornish cross (illustrated Fig. b11) in the churchyard of Gwennap which was moved to the vicarage garden in the 1840s from Chapel Moor. It has a crude crucifixus figure and a small Latin cross on the front and a large Latin cross on the back and is probably a fragment of a larger cross. There is also an ornamented cross shaft which was found in the church wall about 1860 and by mistake used again in the vestry foundations.

There are three Cornish crosses in Helston: one in Cross Street (illustrated Fig. b12) and two in Mr. Baddeley's garden (Cross Street). One of the latter crosses was removed from Tresprison, Wendron, and other from near Trelill Holy Well, Wendron. The cross from Trelill has ornament on the front and back of the shaft. One of the crosses is now Grade II* listed as "Stone cross near junction with Church Street".

There is a Cornish cross (illustrated Fig. b13) in the village of Lizard, Landewednack.

Parishes M - P

In the churchyard of Mabe there is a Celtic cross (illustrated Fig. b14) which was found in the vicarage garden and installed near the porch, at some time between 1919 and 1930. There is another cross at Helland, a farm where there was a garden formerly the site of an ancient chapel.

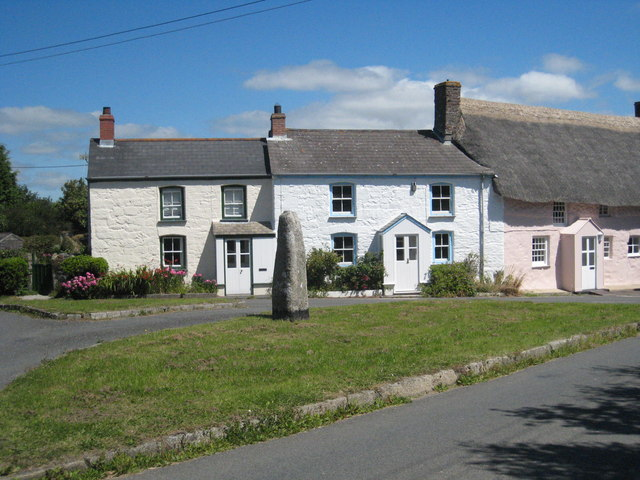
Fig. b4: cottages with a roadside cross at Mawgan Cross

At Mawgan Cross in the parish of Mawgan-in-Meneage there is a Hiberno-Saxon inscribed stone (illustrated Fig. b4) which originally had a cross head,

There is a fragment of a cross head built into the north aisle wall at the parish church of Mawnan; it was found in the churchyard in 1881.

Mullion: There is a Cornish cross (illustrated Fig. b15) near the hamlet of Predannack. It has a broad Latin cross on the front and an incised Latin cross on the back.

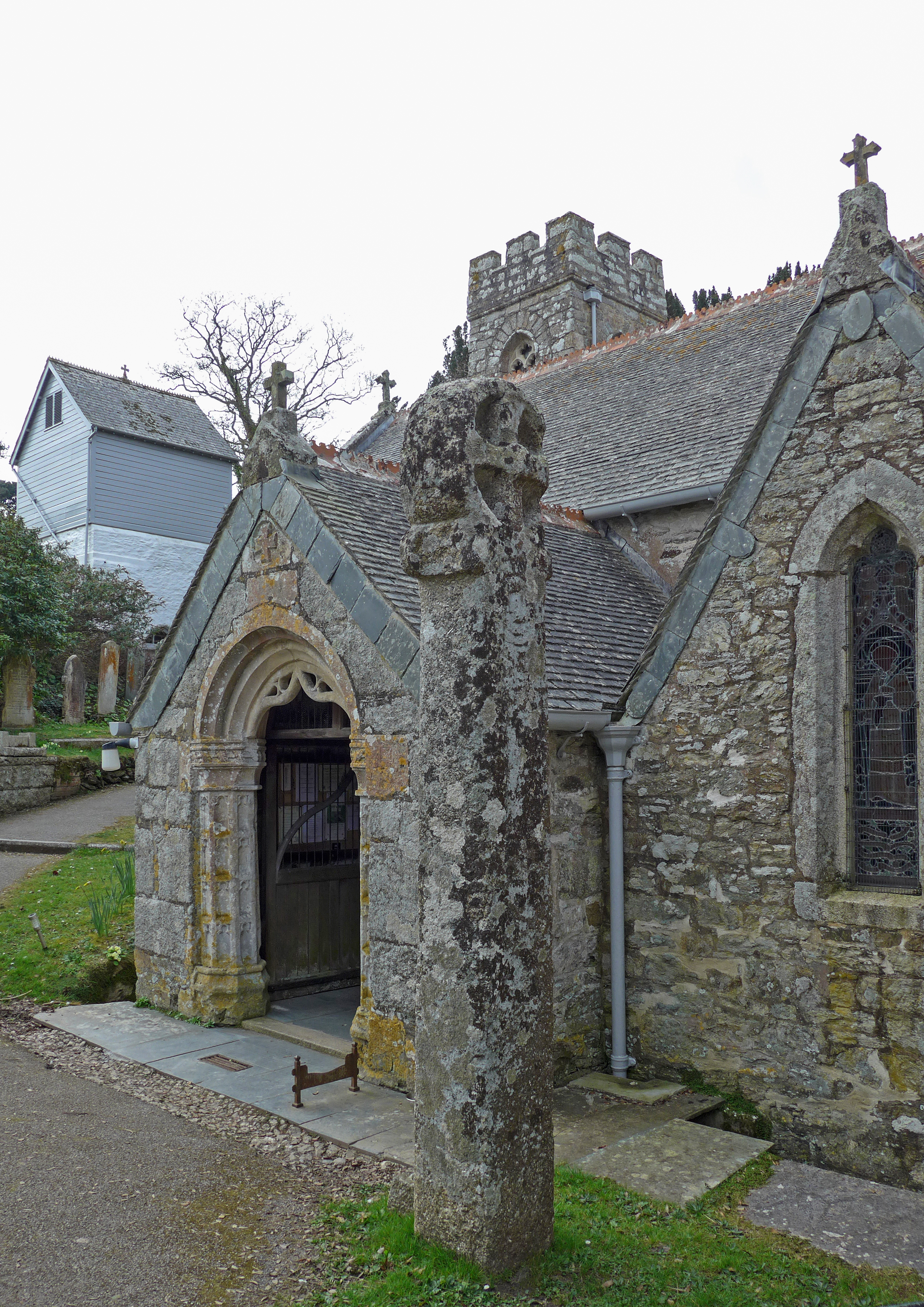
Fig. b5: the cross in the churchyard of Mylor

The cross in the churchyard of Mylor is the largest in Cornwall (10 ft high). The cross was only identified as such in 1870 as it had been buried head downwards in the earth so that the part above ground could serve as a post. The stone is 17 ft 6 in long and there is a local tradition that it marked the site of St Mylor's grave not far from the place where it was found. It is thought to be of pre-Christian origin. It was set up as it is now by sailors from HMS Ganges. There is a Cornish cross in the churchyard of Flushing. It was found in a farm building at Porloe in 1891 and moved to the churchyard. The head has a crude crucifixus figure on the front and a Latin cross on the back.

Parishes S - W

At Tregullow near Scorrier, St Day, there are two Cornish crosses: one of them formerly stood between Ponsanooth and Pengreep and was for a time used as a gatepost. There are two Cornish crosses in the gardens of Scorrier House: the original site of the first cross is unknown; on the front of it is a curious representation of Christ with his right hand raised and on the back a Latin cross. The other cross originally stood at Rame in the parish of Wendron; the shaft is ornamented on all four sides.

There are two Cornish crosses in the parish of St Gluvias; one at Enys and one at Penryn. The cross at Enys (illustrated Fig. b16) was originally at Sancreed and was set up at Enys in 1848. The small cross at Penryn was once built into the fish market; when this was pulled down the cross was saved and resited near the town hall in 1895.

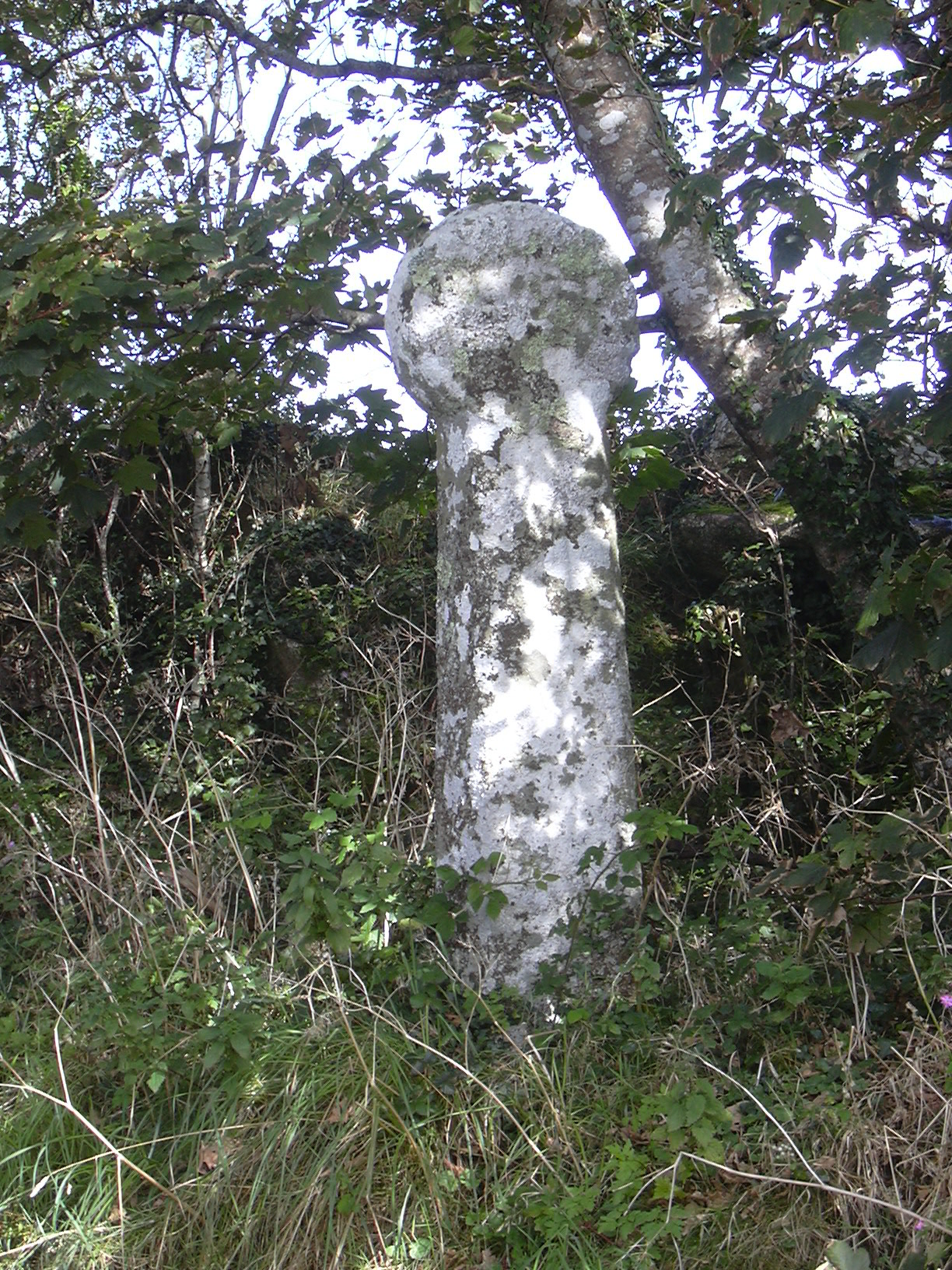
The roadside cross at Merther Uny

There are four Cornish crosses in the parish of Stithians; they are in the vicarage garden, and at Repper's Mill and Trevalis. The cross at Repper's Mill has a crude crucifixus figure on the front and a Latin cross on the back. There are two crosses at Trevalis: both have a crude crucifixus figure on the front and a Latin cross on the back. One of the crosses formerly stood at Hendra Hill near the churchtown but was moved to Trevalis about 1860. Another cross (illustrated Fig. b17) stands in the grounds of Tretheague House. There is a Cornish cross (illustrated Fig. b18) in the churchyard of Penmarth (historically in the parish of Wendron); it was found in a stream near Tolcarn Wartha Mill and brought to the churchyard for preservation.

Arthur Langdon (1896) recorded the existence of seven stone crosses in the parish of Wendron, including two at Merther Uny (one illustrated above right & Fig. b7). The other crosses were in the churchyard, and at Boderwennack, Bodilly, Manhay-vean and Trenethick. There is also an early cross-slab in the church. An old carved granite stone can be seen approximately 300 yards (270 m) south-west of Porkellis Crossroads in the private field on the corner near Bodilly. The stone stands 4 ft 5 in (1.35 m) high, with a bas-relief cross on one side and an incised cross on the other. According to local oral history, it was called the "Wendron God" and people made the sign of the cross when passing by. Formerly located on a hill between Carilley and Burhos, it was unlawfully removed several times in the 19th century and finally relocated to Bodilly in 1886. Arthur Langdon (1896) gave the following account of the Merther Uny crosses: "The cross stands in situ on the Merther Uny estate, on Polglaze Hill, by the left-hand side of the road from St. Wendron to Constantine. Formerly there was a road leading down to Merther Uny old churchyard, the entrance to which was close to the cross; but all traces of this road have now disappeared. A tradition is still believed in the neighbourhood that a man lies buried beneath the cross. The monolith is known locally as 'Meruny Cross'."--"The cross occupies its original site, near the south side of the entrance to the old churchyard, and stands on a base ... The cross has some very curious ornament, and in many points resembles that at Roche ..." Another cross was originally at Rame, Wendron: it is described above under St Day.

Gallery

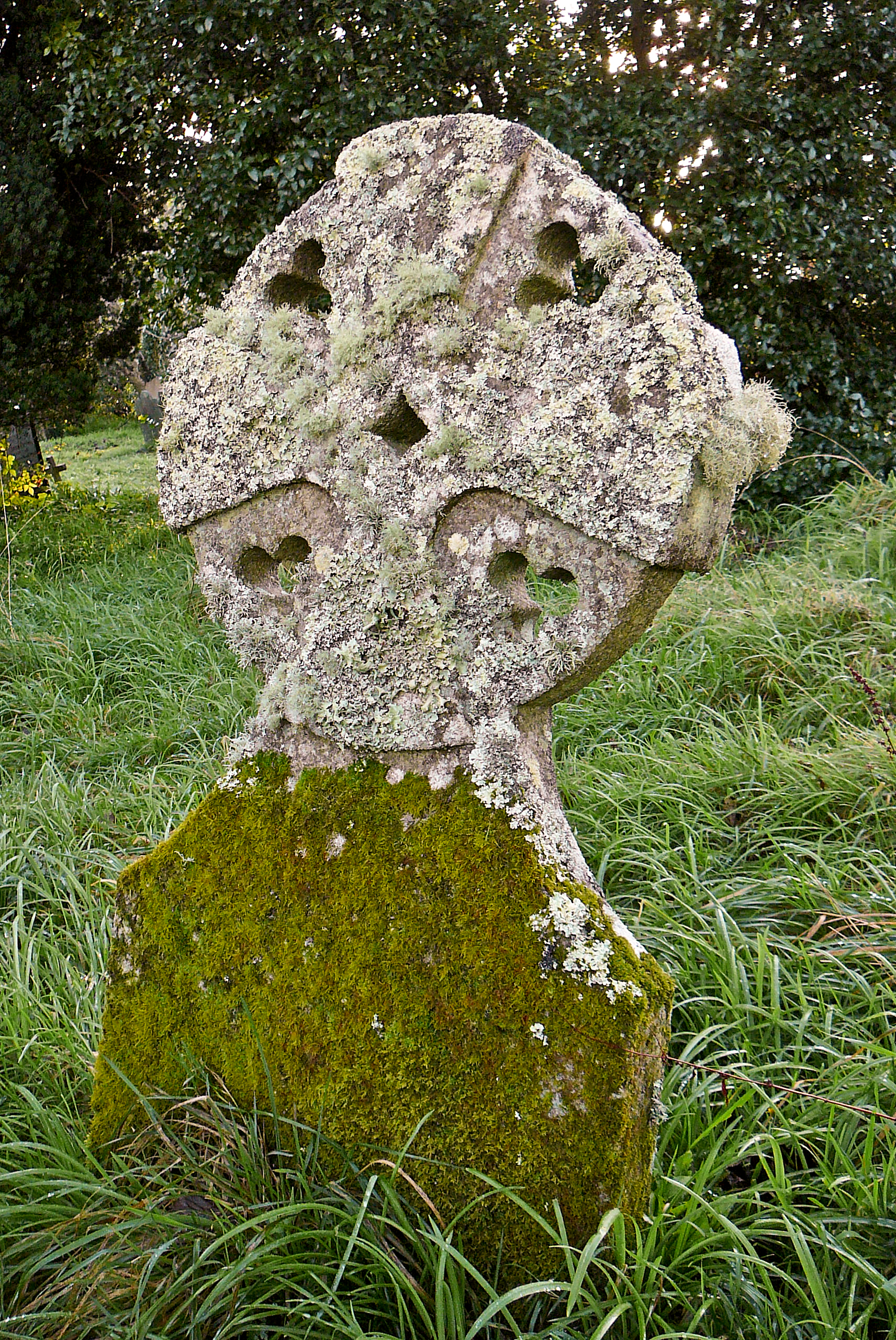
Fig. b6: one of the crosses in the churchyard of Budock

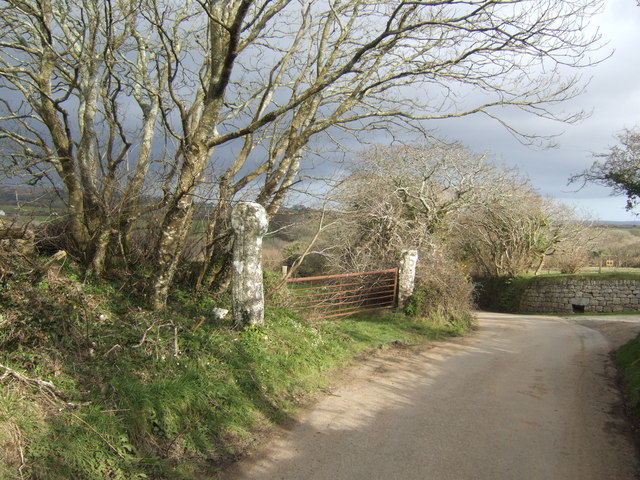
Fig. b7: a cross carved onto a standing stone next to the lane from Treloquithack to Brill

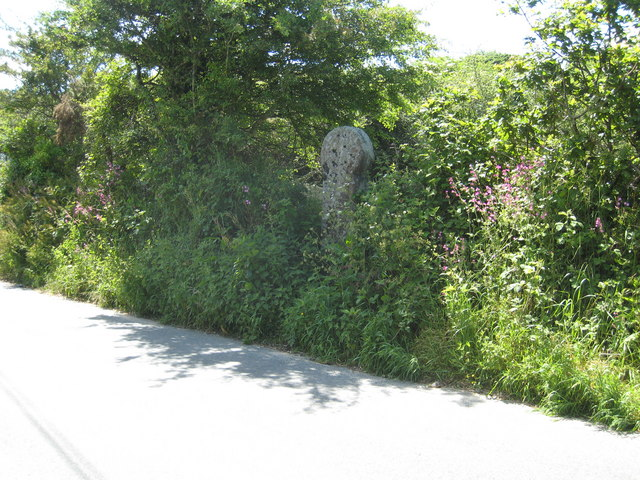
Fig. b8: a cross beside the road at Trewardreva Mill

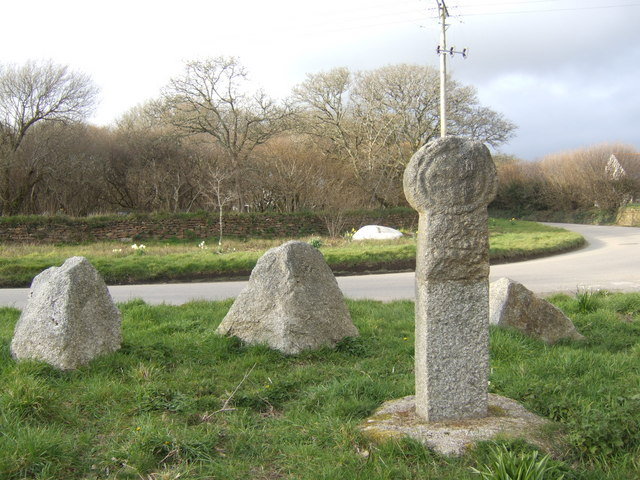
Fig. b9: a cross beside the road from Constantine to Penryn

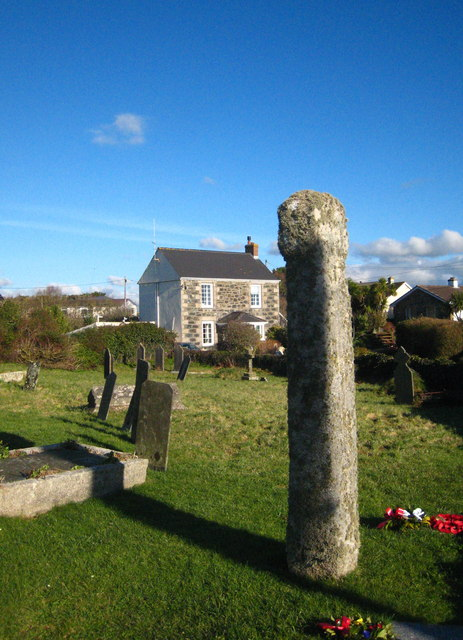
Fig. b10: the cross in Cury churchyard

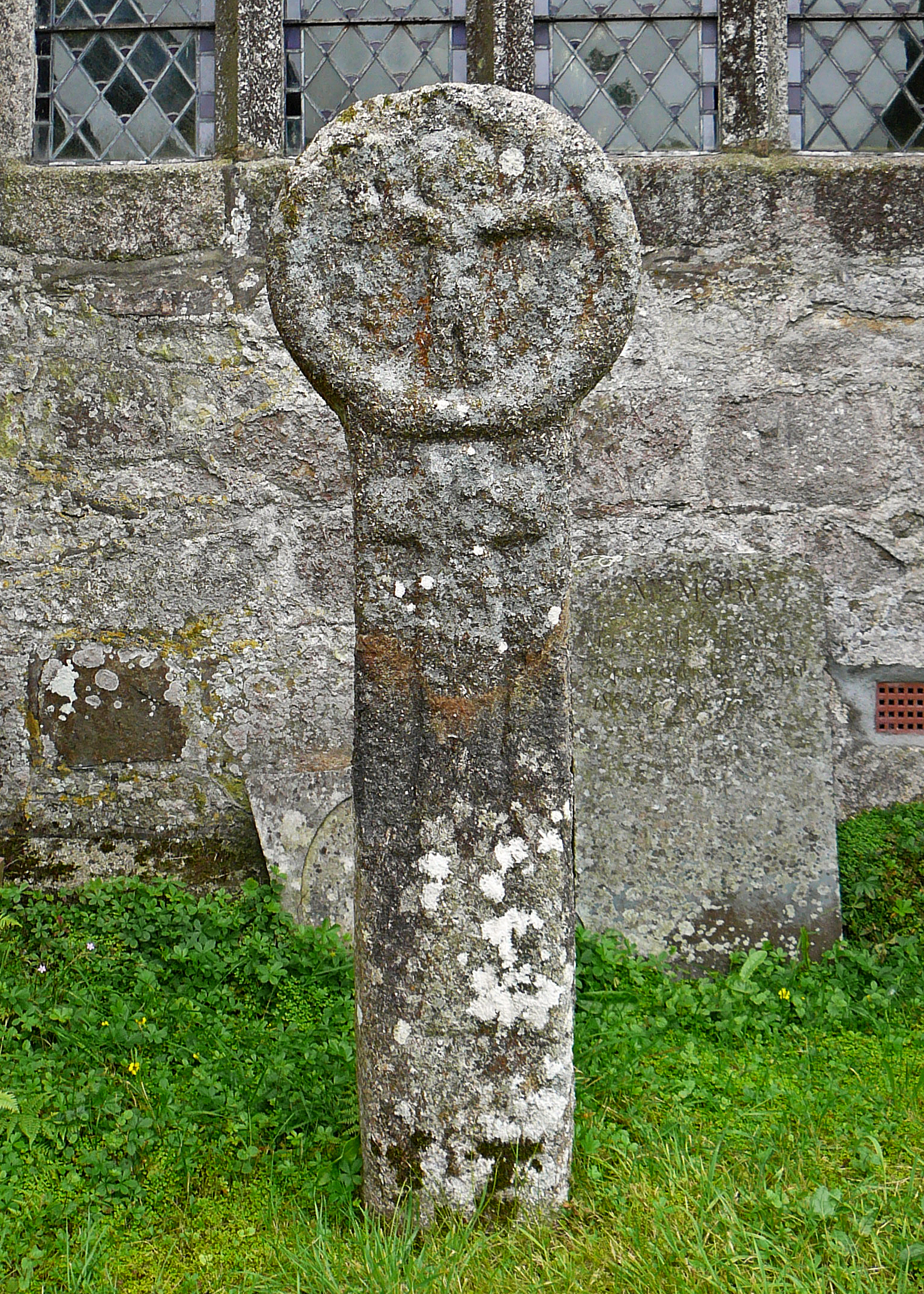
Fig. b11: the cross in the churchyard of Gwennap

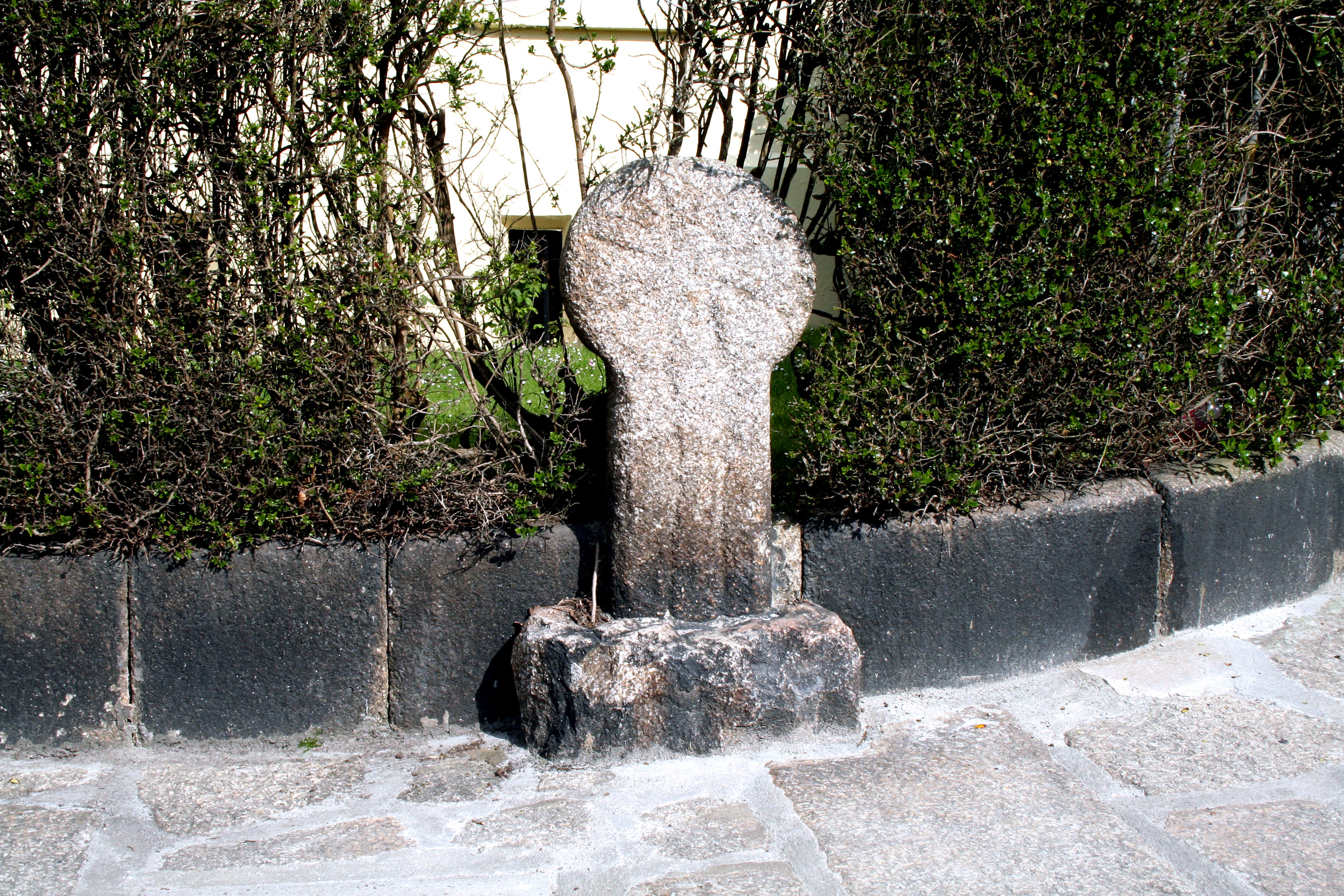
Fig. b12: the cross in Cross Street, Helston

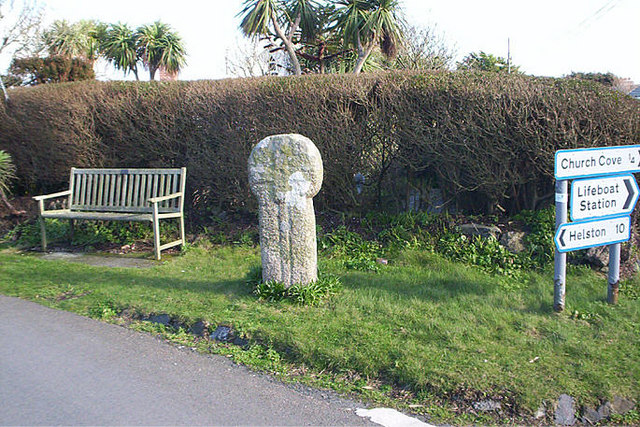
Fig. b13: the Cornish cross at Lizard

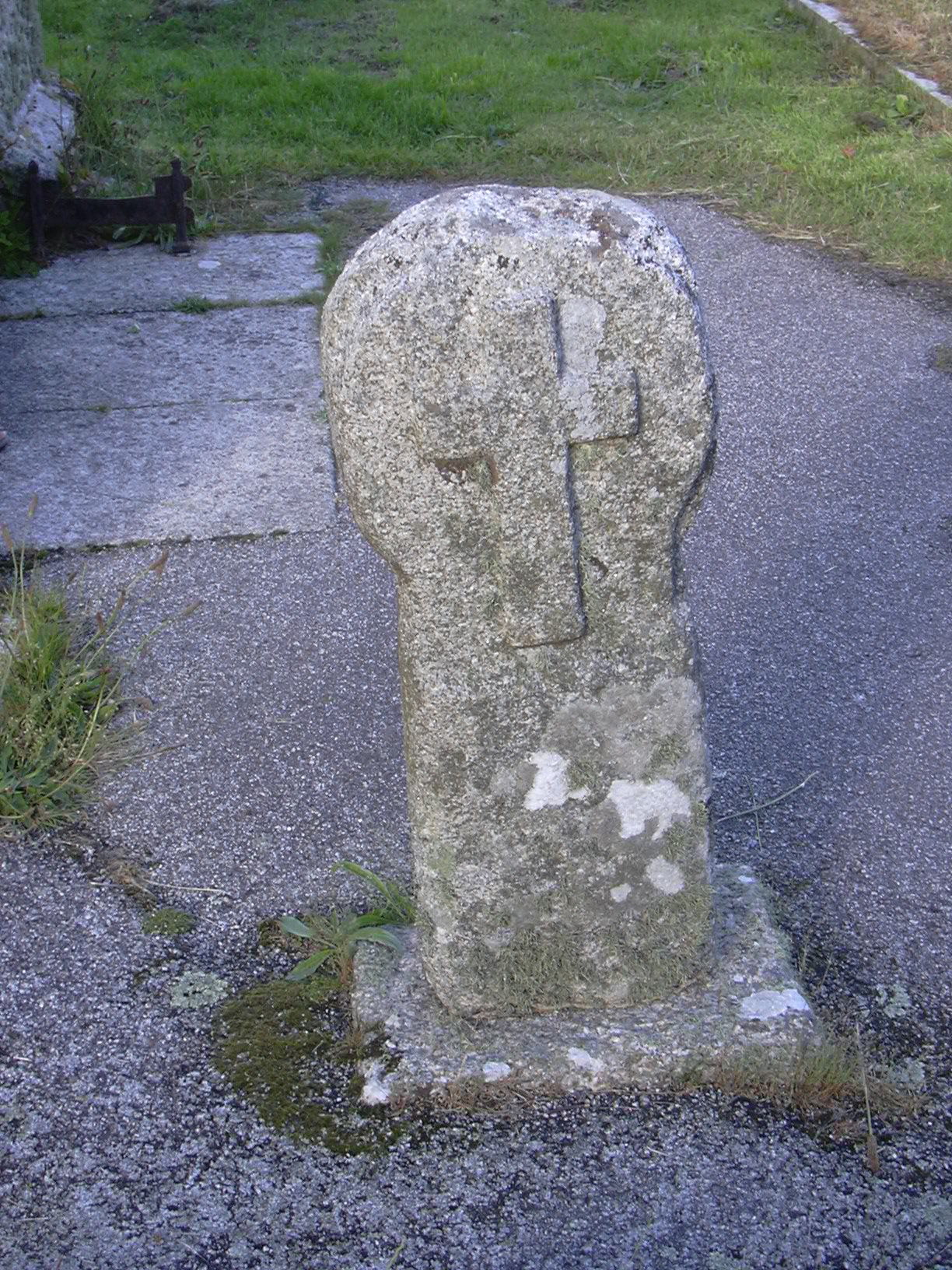
Fig. b14: the cross in the churchyard of Mabe

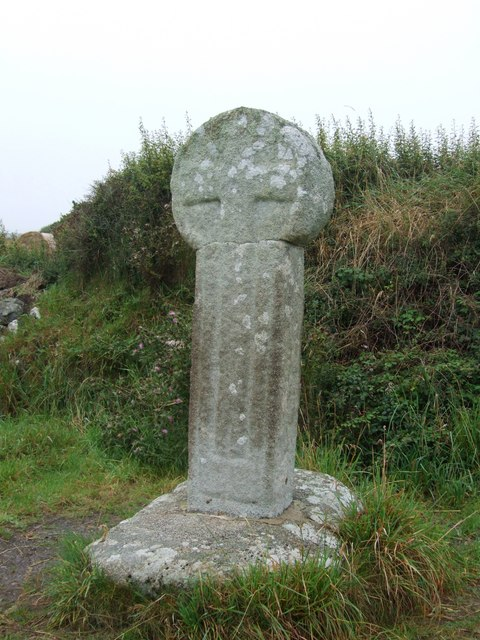
Fig. b15: Predannack Cross

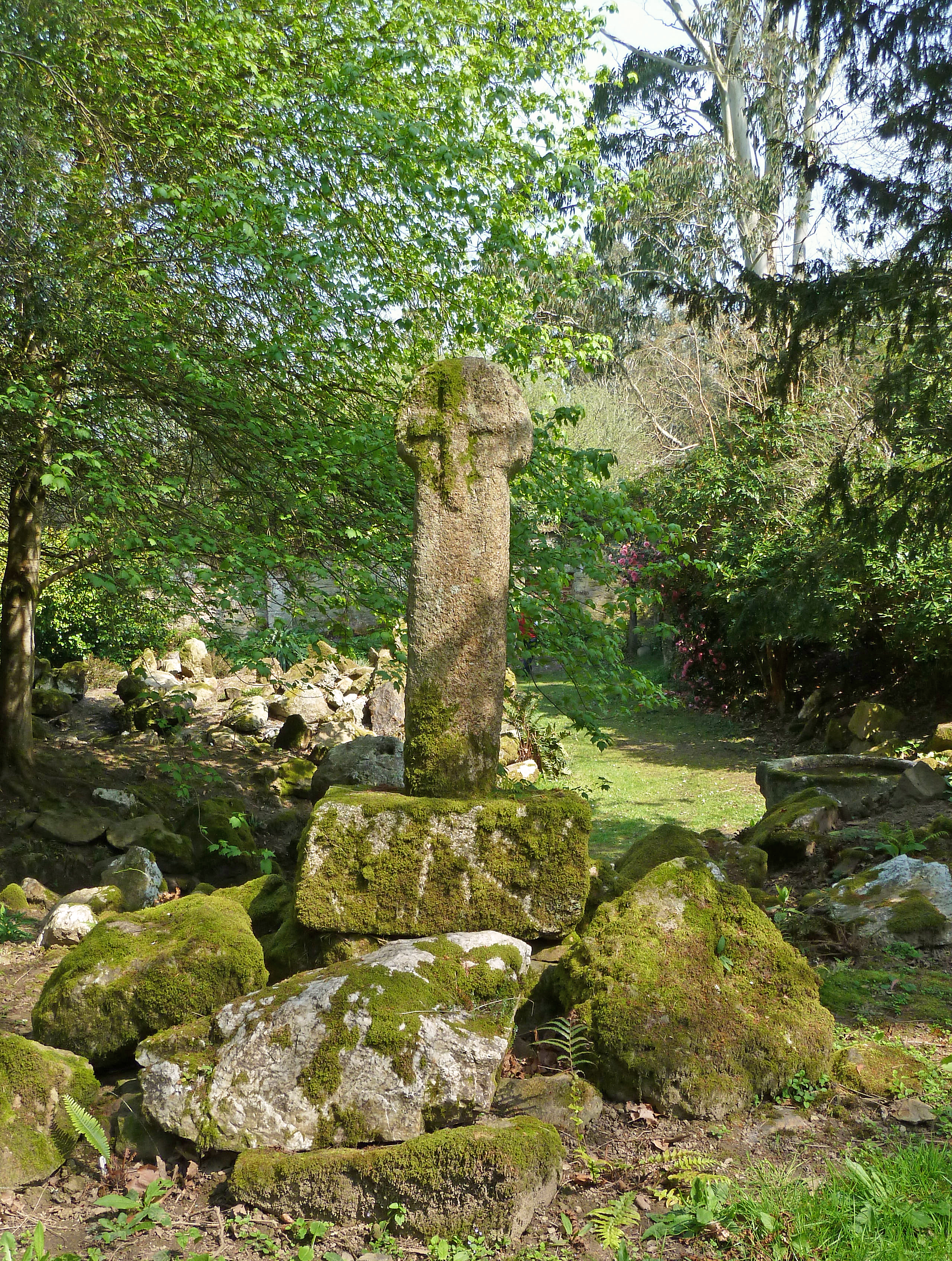
Fig. b16: the Cornish cross at Enys

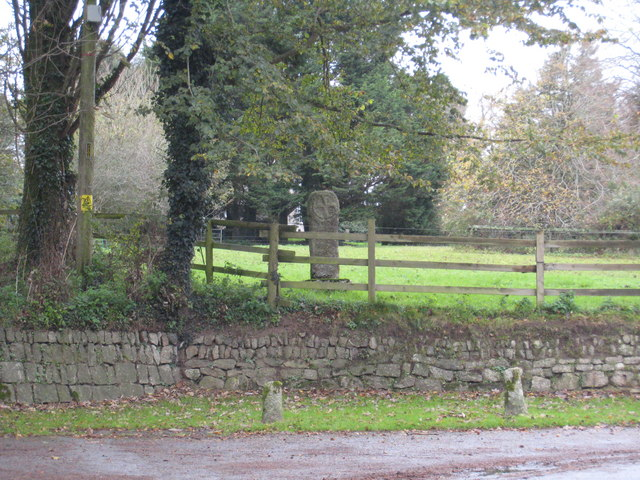
Fig. b17: an ancient cross in the grounds of Tretheague House

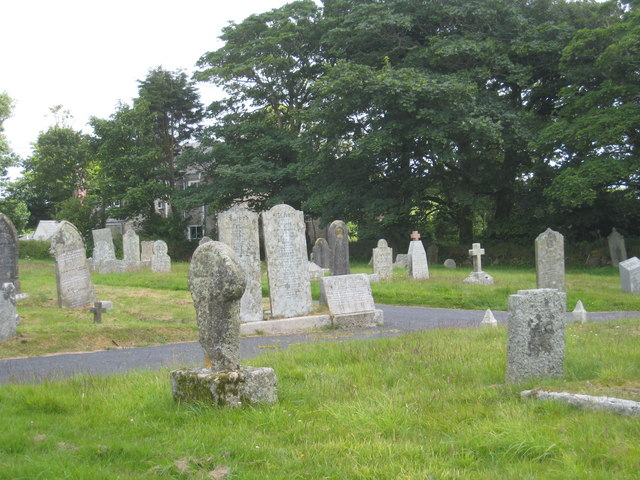
Fig. b18: Carnmenellis churchyard

== Crosses in Lesnewth hundred ==
Parishes A - L

In a field on the west side of the parish church of Advent stands a tall and elegant Cornish cross.

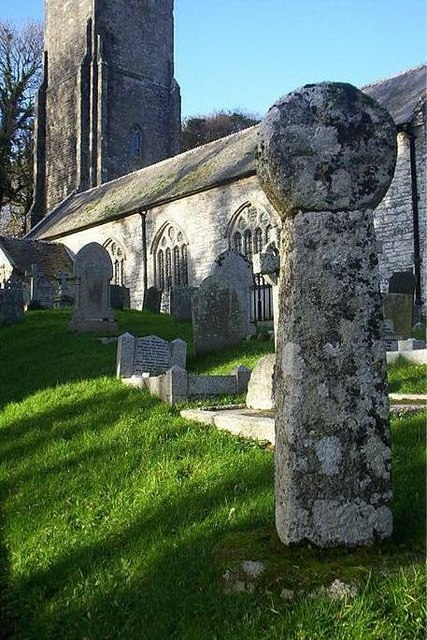
Fig. c1: St Nonna's Cross

Arthur Langdon (1896) records seven stone crosses in the parish of Altarnun, of which one is in the churchyard. A Celtic cross from the time of St Nonna is located by the church gate of Altarnun. This cross consists of a cross head resting on a stone base. Another cross is located at Two-gates by the road about half a mile (0.8 km) north of the church; it is locally known as "Short Cross" and is probably a fragment of what was once a taller stone. Other crosses are known as Sanctuary Cross, Halvana Cross, Occasiney Cross, Trekennick Cross, Tresmeak Cross and St Vincent's Mine Cross.

Arthur Langdon (1896) records two Cornish crosses in the parish of Davidstow, one at Lambrenny and one at Trevivian.

Forrabury and Minster: Outside the churchyard of Forrabury stands a Cornish cross (illustrated Fig. c3) which has been moved from its original site, which is likely to have been near the field called Cross Park. At Waterpit Down (in Minster parish on the road towards Launceston) are the remains of a cross probably from the 10th century.

Arthur Langdon (1896) recorded the existence of seven stone crosses (illustrated Fig. c4 & c5) in the parish of Lanteglos-by-Camelford, including three at the rectory.

There is a Cornish cross (illustrated Fig. c6) in Lesnewth churchyard which consists of an ancient cross head mounted on a modern shaft.

Parishes M - W

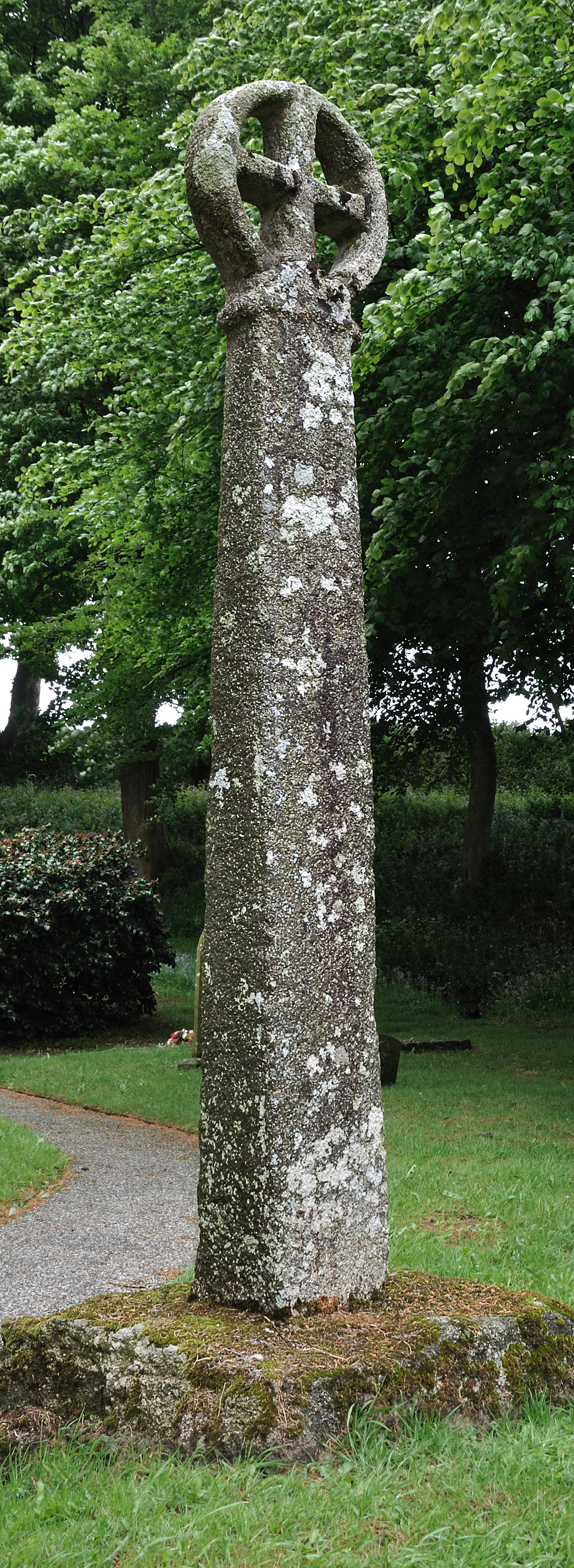
Fig. c2: the churchyard cross at Michaelstow

There is fine tall Cornish cross in the churchyard of Michaelstow. Its original location is unknown; until it was removed in 1883 it formed part of a series of steps up to the churchyard. There are three Cornish crosses and a cross base at Trevenning. In 1896 they were in Mr. Bastard's garden. Mr. Bastard had brought two of the crosses from part of Bodmin Moor in the parish of St Breward in 1888. Trevenning Cross (illustrated top right, no. 70) is at a road junction about one and a half miles northeast of St Tudy churchtown. It was found in the hedge some years before 1896 close to its present position by J. R. Collins of Bodmin.

Arthur Langdon (1896) records five stone crosses in the parish of St Clether of which four are at the old manor house of Basill Barton.

There are three Cornish crosses of early dating in the parish of St Juliot. There are two Cornish crosses in the churchyard. One of the crosses was originally sited at Anderton Mill, Lesnewth, but was brought here for preservation in 1852.

There are two stone crosses in the parish of Tintagel; they have both been moved from their original positions. Aelnat's cross (illustrated Fig. 2) which was found at Trevillet and then moved to the Wharncliffe Arms Hotel at Trevena, is finely carved. The inscription can be read as 'Aelnat fecit hanc crucem pro anima sua' (Ælnat made this cross for [the good of] his soul) (the back of the stone has the names of the four evangelists): the name of this man is Saxon (together with Alfwy mentioned in 1086 he is the only Anglo-Saxon recorded in connection with the area). One of Thomas Hardy's poems, "By the runic stone" (1917) was interpreted by Evelyn Hardy as referring to Aelnat's cross. At a crossroads near Bossiney stands Hendra Cross or Pentaly Cross (towards Trevillet; illustrated Fig. c7): it has been moved from its former position due to road widening in 1959.

There is an early Cornish wheel-headed wayside cross in the churchyard of Trevalga. The cross is believed to date from the 8th century. It used to stand by the church path but was moved to the churchyard in the early 19th century by the then rector. At Lower Youlton farm, Warbstow, is a Cornish cross in use as a footbridge; it has undergone much wear from foot passengers and its original location is unknown.

Gallery

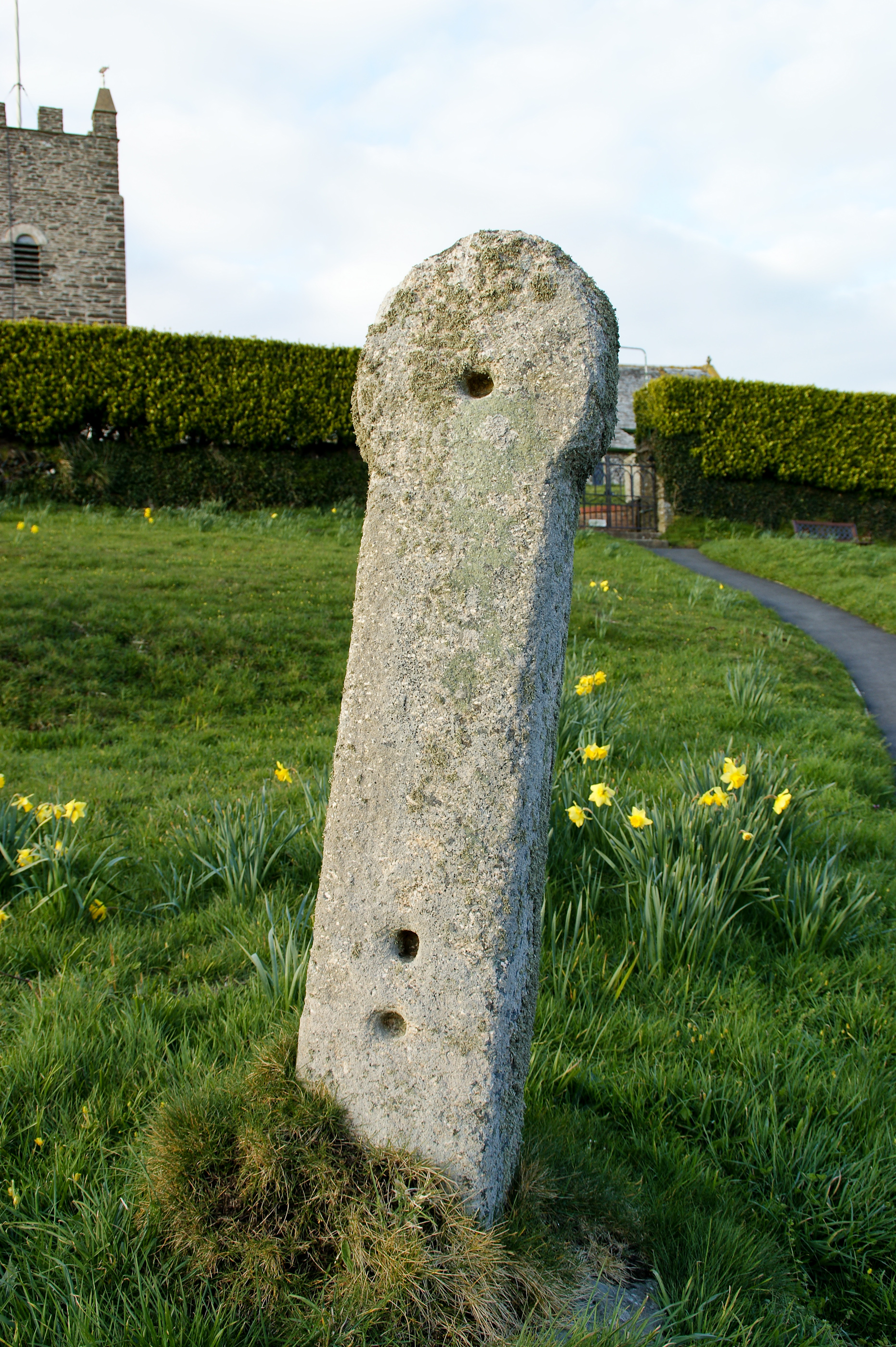
Fig. c3: the Cornish cross at Forrabury

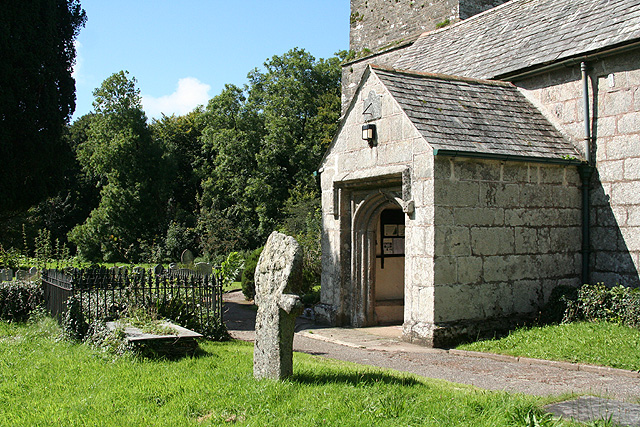
Fig. c4: a Cornish cross in the churchyard at Lanteglos; it was found in a blacksmith's shop at Valley Truckle

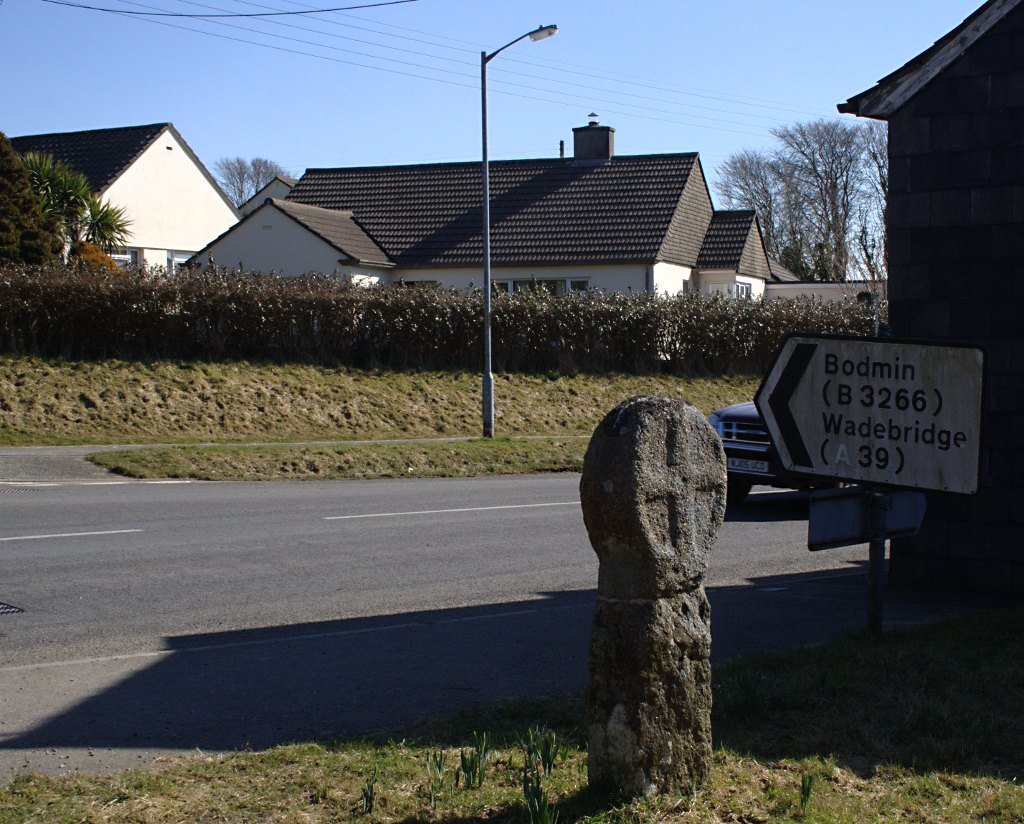
Fig. c5: the Cornish cross, Trevia, Camelford

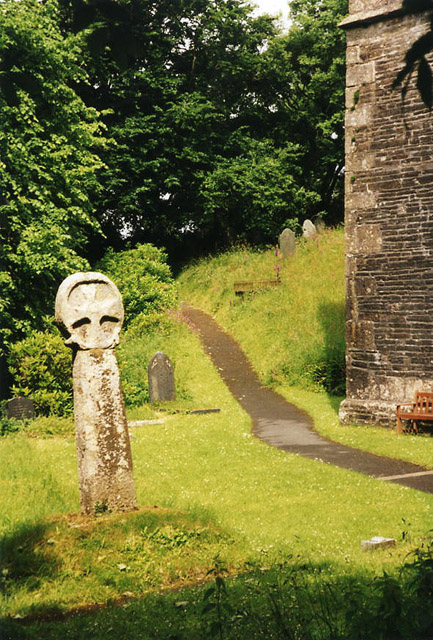
Fig. c6: the cross in the churchyard of Lesnewth

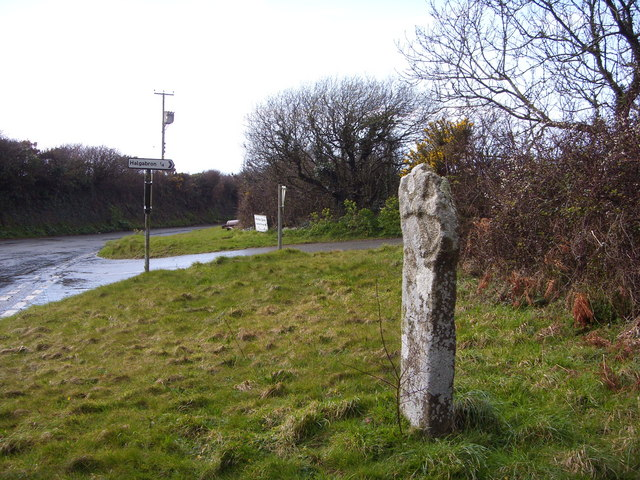
Fig. c7: Hendra or Pentaly Cross

== Crosses in Penwith hundred ==
Parishes C - G

Camborne churchyard (illustrated Fig. d10) contains a number of crosses collected from nearby sites: the finest is one found in a well at Crane in 1896 but already known from William Borlase's account of it when it was at Fenton-ear. Arthur Langdon (1896) records six crosses in the parish, including two at Pendarves (Troon), two at Trevu and one outside the Institute. One of the Pendarves crosses was found in a ditch on the estate and then set up near the house. It has a crude crucifixus figure on the front and a Latin cross on the back. The other is a cross head found in the kitchen garden at Pendarves. There is a cross at Camborne Park Recreation Ground (NHLE ref. no. 1003049).

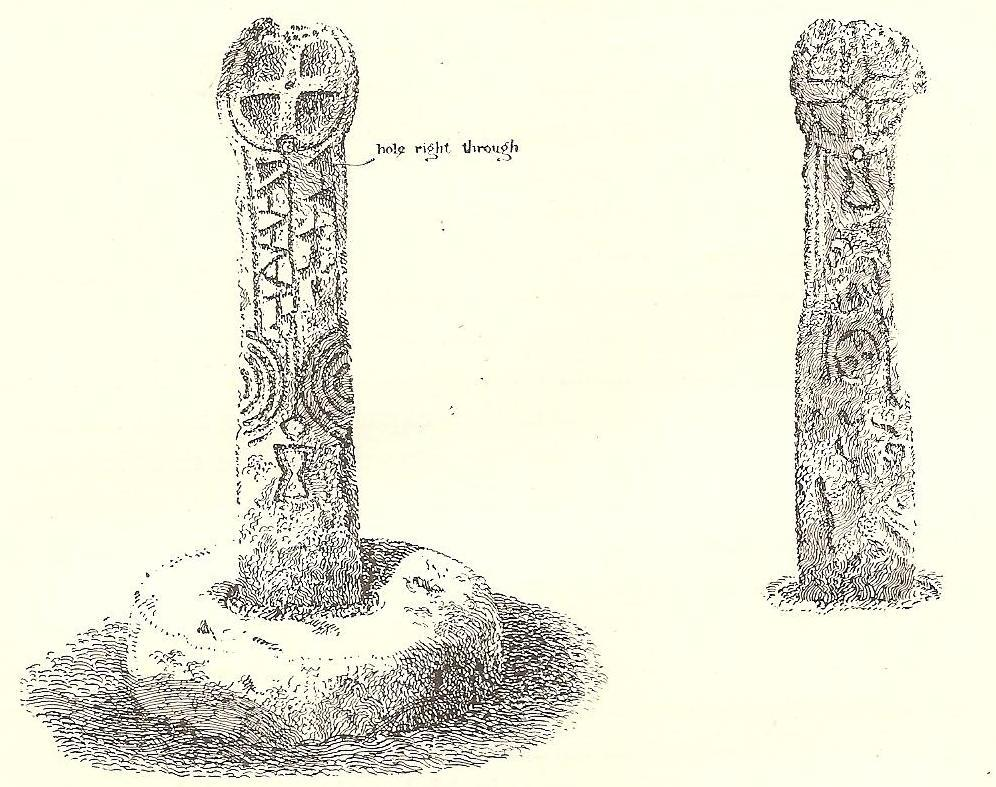
Fig. d1: This cross once stood at the north of Nine Maidens Downs and marked the boundary between Camborne, Crowan, Wendron and Illogan parishes. It now stands in the grounds of Clowance House. The crossroads was known as Binnerton Cross; the head has a Greek cross on one side and a crude figure of Christ on the other.

There are four Cornish crosses in the parish of Crowan; one cross is at Praze-an-Beeble and three are at Clowance. The original location of the Praze cross is unknown. Two of the Clowance crosses have a cross on one side and a crude crucifixus figure on the other; one formerly stood at Bold Gate on Clowance Down and the other at Binnerton Cross. The third cross is curiously ornamented on the front and back of the shaft; it formerly stood at the northwest corner of Nine Maidens' Down.

There is a Cornish cross at Rosemorran, Gulval; on the front of the head is a crude crucifixus figure and on the back is a cross of unusual shape (the only similar one is at Lelant).

There are three Cornish crosses in the parish of Gwinear; one on Connor Down and two in the churchyard. One of those in the churchyard was brought there from a road junction about half a mile east of the churchtown.

There is a Cornish cross in the churchyard of Gwithian. (See also fig. d11, below)

Parishes I - P

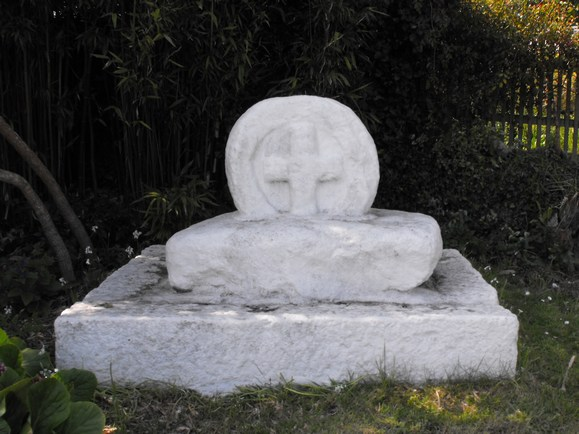
Fig. d2: the cross at Whitecross

The Cornish cross in the churchyard of Illogan is probably in situ. It is Grade II listed.

Arthur Langdon (1896) records eight stone crosses in the parish of Lelant, of which four are in the churchyard (two crosses: illustrated Fig. d12 & d13); the other crosses are at Brunian Cairn, Lelant Lane, Sea Lane and the churchtown. Three of the crosses are Grade II* listed as "Stone cross in churchyard, immediately south of St Uny's Church", "Stone cross in furthermost southern churchyard south of St Uny's Church" and "Stone cross in western cemetery (at crossing of paths) west of St Uny's Church". See also Fig. d14.

There are four Cornish crosses in the parish of Ludgvan; one is at Crowlas (illustrated Fig. d17), another at White Cross (this has a cross on one side of the head and a crude crucifixus figure on the other; illustrated Fig. d2 above right) and two are in the churchyard (illustrated Fig. d15 & d16).

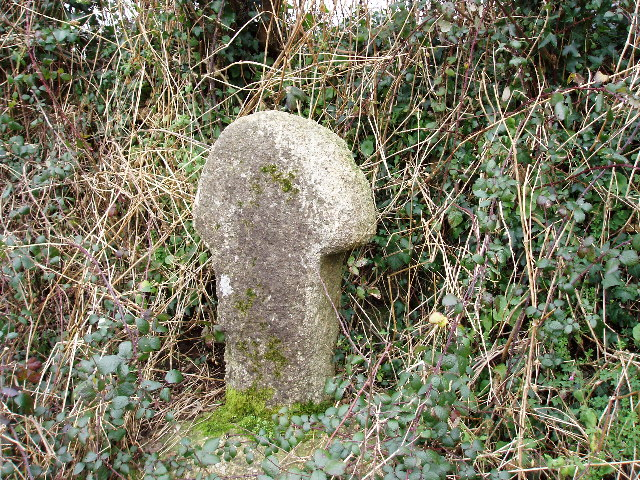
Fig. d3: an old cross in hedge near Lesingey Lane

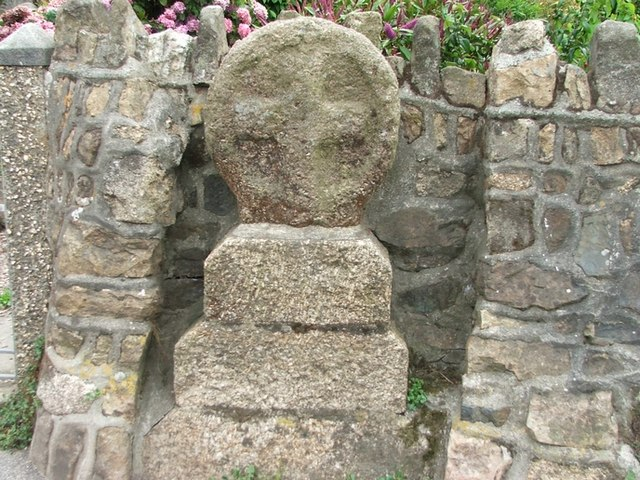
Fig. d4: the cross at Heamoor

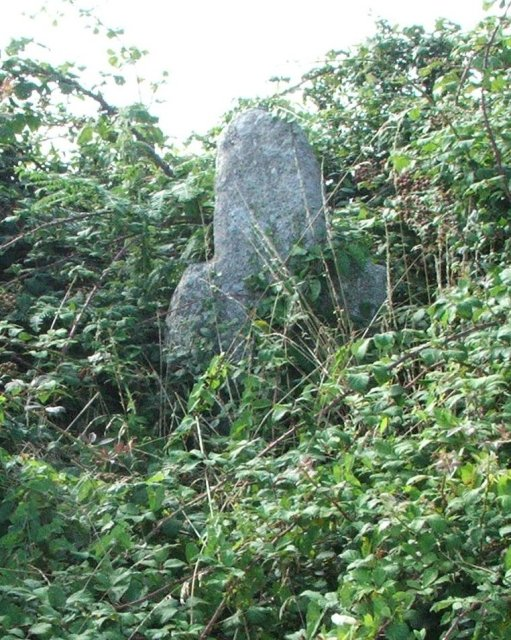
Fig. d5: Tremethick Cross

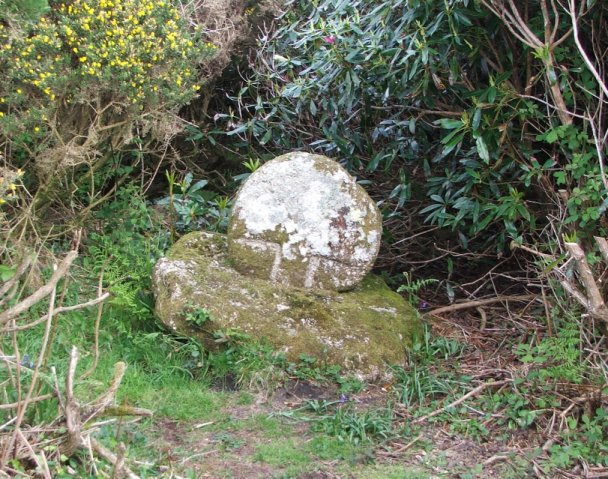
Fig. d6: Trengwainton Cross

Arthur Langdon (1896) records eight stone crosses in the parish of Madron, of which one is in the churchyard (illustrated Fig. d18) and one is at Heamoor (illustrated Fig. d4). The others are at Boscathnoe (illustrated Fig. d21), Boswarthen (illustrated Fig. d19), Parc-an-Growse, Trembath Cross (illustrated Fig. d20) and Trengwainton Carn. Tremethick, Tremathick or Trereife cross (illustrated Fig. 21a) is a stone Latin cross which was brought to Tremethick Cross from Rose-an-Beagle in the parish of Paul. There is a Cornish cross by the road near the churchyard of Newlyn; it was found at Trereiffe about 1870 and much later placed near the church by the Rev. W. L. Lach-Szyrma.

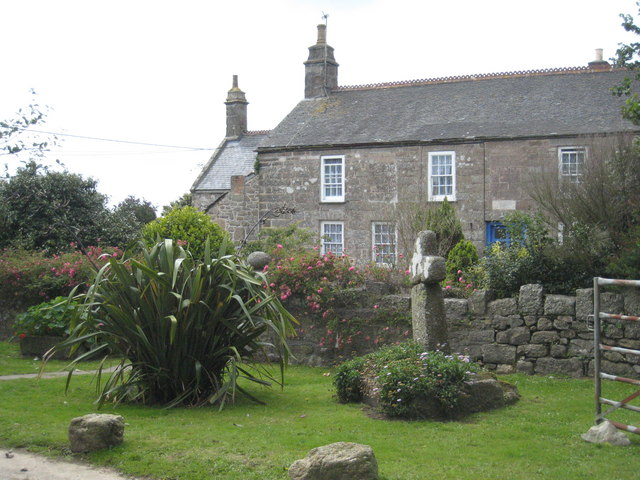
Fig. d7: a cross at Kerris Farm

Arthur Langdon (1896) recorded the existence of five stone crosses in the parish of Paul. One is at Carlankan, one at Halwyn and one at St Paul Down. There are also crosses in the vicarage hedge and on the churchyard wall; the former is a short shaft and unpierced wheel-head with a Greek cross in relief. and the latter is the head of a pierced wheel-head cross with a figure of Christ in relief on one side and five bosses on the other. (illustrated Fig. d22; the latter has a crude crucifixus figure on one side). See also the cross at Kemyel Drea illustrated Fig. d23.

Penlee Cross is a large granite cross situated outside Penlee House at Penzance; it dates from the 11th century and has been moved, on at least three occasions, and its original location being the Green Market in Penzance.

Arthur G. Langdon (1896) recorded the existence of six stone crosses in the parish of Phillack, including two in the churchyard. The others were at Copperhouse, at Bodriggy, in a field and in the rectory garden.

Parishes S - Z

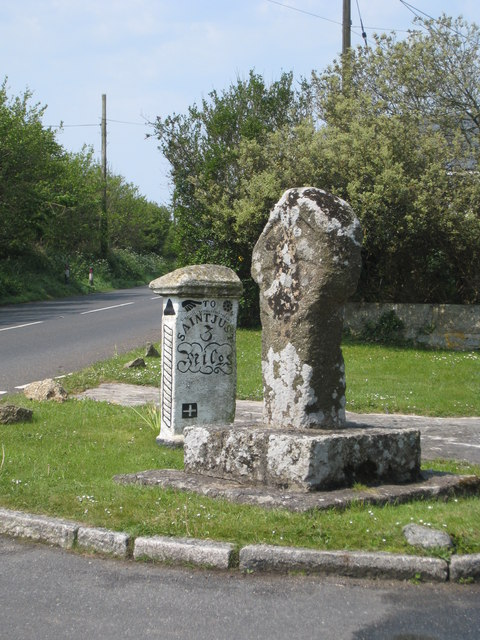
Fig. d8: the cross at Crows-an-Wra

Arthur Langdon (1896) records twelve crosses in the parish of St Buryan of which one is in the churchyard. A letter, dated 25 June 1879, to The Cornishman newspaper complained of the platform of the village cross (illustrated Fig. d25), in front of the churchyard gate, being used as the site for the mid-summer bonfire, leaving the cross blackened and charred. Boskenna cross (illustrated Fig. d26) is a Cornish cross which stands where three roads meet south-east of St Buryan churchtown. It was found buried in a hedge at this road junction in 1869. Only the carved upper part of the cross is ancient. A cross near St Loy's Cove is illustrated Fig. d27; a cross near Down's Barn Farm is illustrated Fig. d28. Another cross is at Crows-an-Wra (illustrated Fig. d8).

Langdon (1896) recorded that six stone crosses existed in the parish of St Erth, including two in the churchyard. One of the crosses is illustrated Fig. d29.

There is a Cornish cross in the churchyard of St Hilary; it has a Latin cross on both sides. There is another cross on Trewhela Lane.

There is a Cornish cross at Penbeagle near St Ives, bearing an incised Latin cross.

Arthur Langdon (1896) recorded the existence of seven stone crosses in the parish of St Just in Penwith, including two in the vicarage garden and two at Kenidjack. Another cross has been built into the church wall; there are also crosses at Leswidden (illustrated Fig. 30) and Nanquidno. There is a Cornish cross in the vicarage garden of Pendeen. Boslow Cross is 550 yds (500 m) NW of Boslow Farm (ref. no. 1003110).

Arthur Langdon (1896) records five stone crosses in the parish of St Levan, of which one is in the churchyard (illustrated Fig. d31), one on the churchyard wall and the others at Rospletha (illustrated Fig. d32), Sawah and Trebehor.

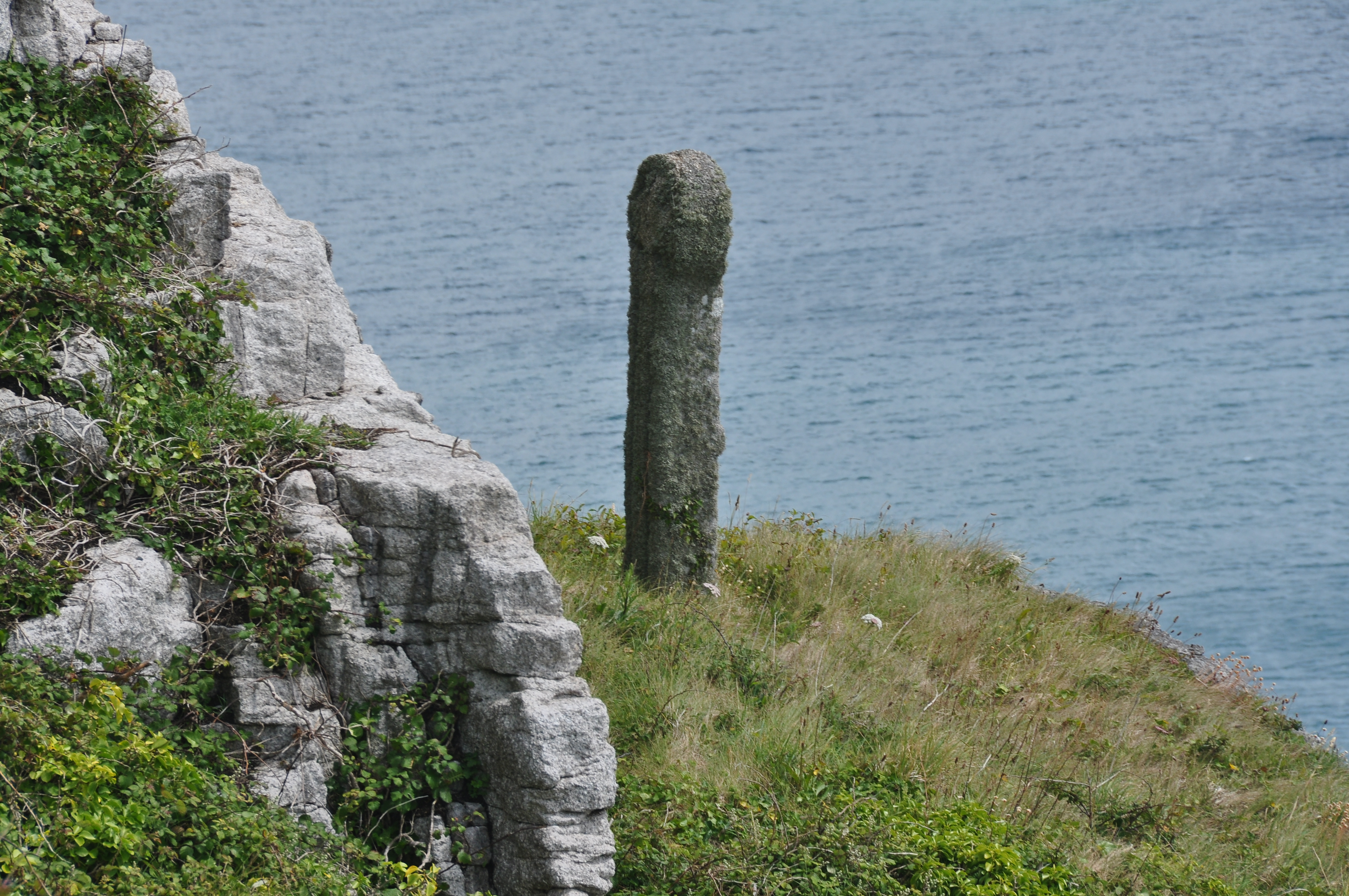
Fig. d9: one of the crosses on St Michael's Mount

In the grounds of the castle of St Michael's Mount are a number of medieval crosses (including a late 15th-century lantern cross) and an octagonal cross shaft.

Arthur Langdon (1896) recorded the existence of eight stone crosses in the parish of Sancreed, including four in the churchyard. One is at Anjarden; one of the crosses in the churchyard was found at Trannack and another at Sellan. Two more crosses in the churchyard are ornamented (one of them is illustrated top right Fig. 1, no. 37; the other below, Fig. d33); the heads are unusual and the only ones of their type and the shafts are ornamented, in one case on all four sides and in the other on three sides. These two crosses are Hiberno-Saxon and both have the same unusual shape of the heads, with a crucifixus on one side. There is also a cross at Brane (illustrated Fig. d34) which serves as a boundary stone between Brane and Boswarthen. Another cross at Lower Drift was found about 1850 and there is yet another at Trenuggo Hill.

There are five Cornish crosses in the parish of Sennen. One is at Escalls and another at Sennen Green. Trevilley cross is one of only two crosses with a crucifixus figure on a cross carved onto the stone (there is a cross on the other side of the head). A cross on the churchyard wall came from a site near the Giant's Stone. A fine cross in the cemetery adjoining the churchyard (illustrated Fig. d35) was found in use as a footbridge near Trevear and moved to the churchyard in 1878. About 1890 it was moved to its present position. A cross at Mayon Farm is illustrated below, fig. d36.

There was a Cornish cross at Tredorwin, Towednack; it was found in use as a building stone in a cottage at Coldharbour in 1880. It is now in the churchyard (illustrated Fig. d37). The stone in the porch of the church forms a bench; the cross shaft has crosses at both ends.

There are three Cornish crosses in the parish of Zennor: one is in the vicarage garden and two are in the churchyard. Those in the churchyard are fixed on the tombstone of the Rev. William Borlase, Vicar of Zennor (died 1888).

Gallery

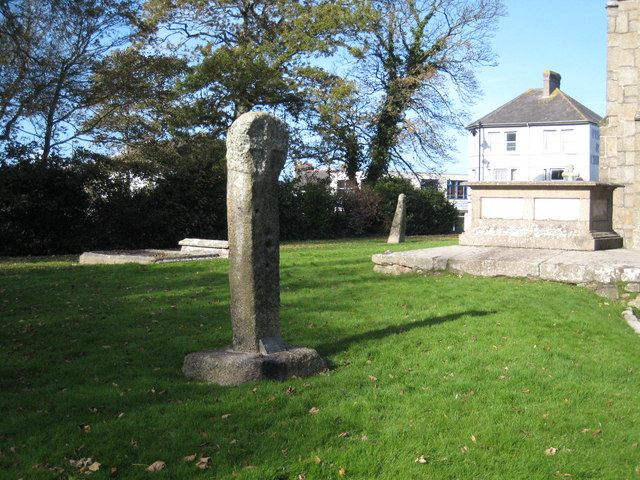
Fig. d10: two crosses in Camborne churchyard

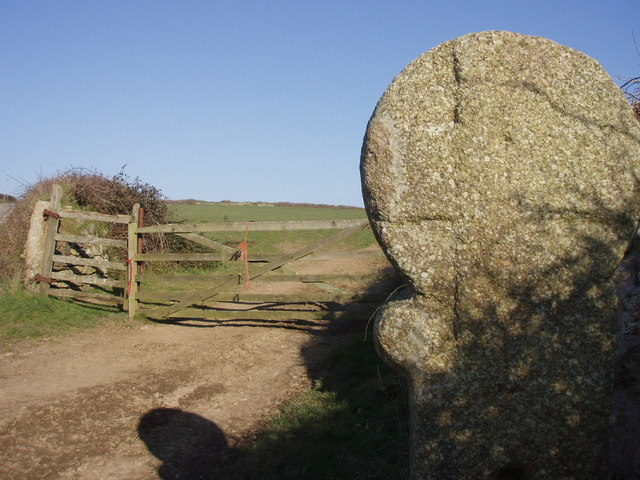
Fig. d11: a Cornish cross just off a footpath leading east above the Red River valley near Gwithian

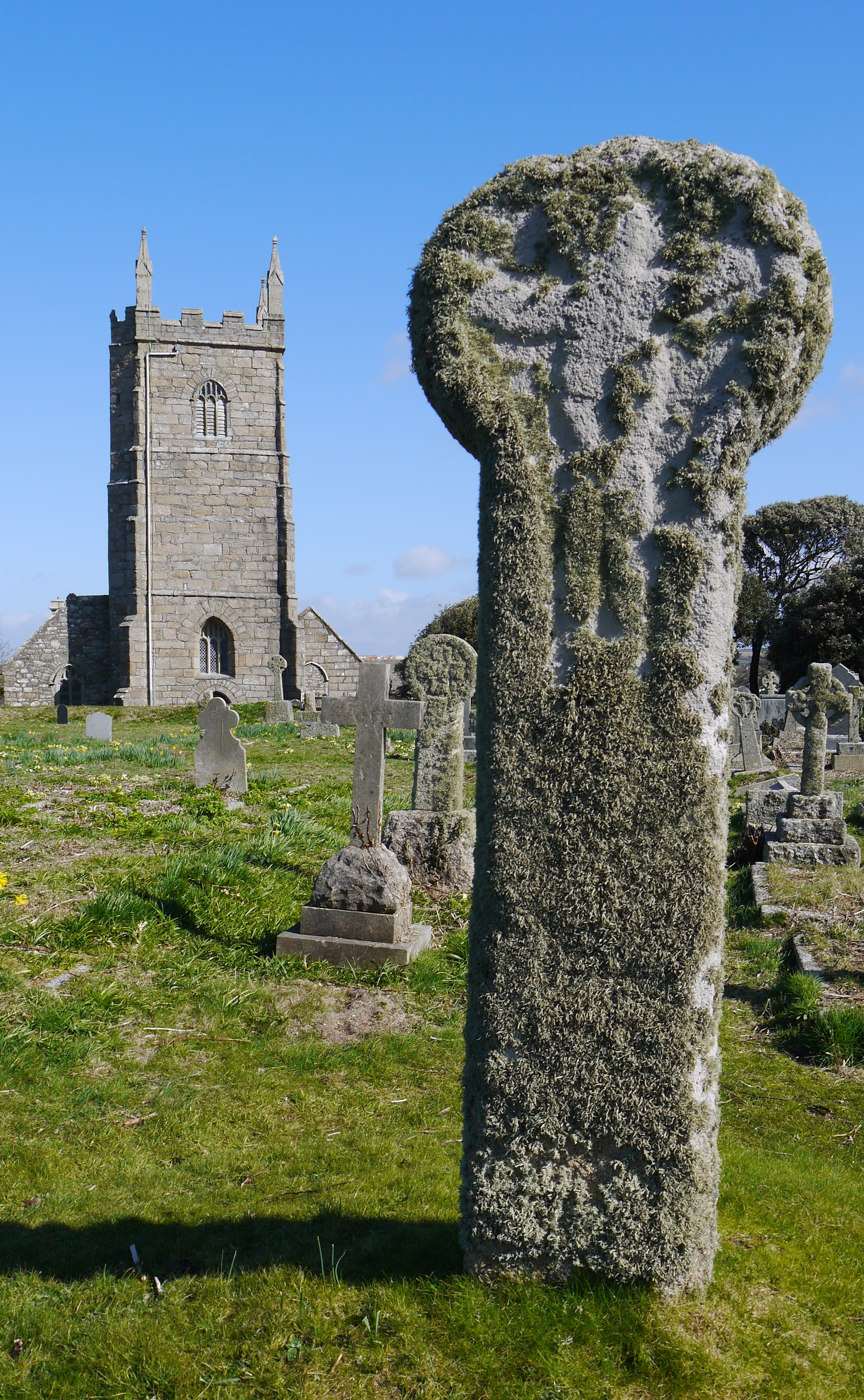
Fig. d12: one of the crosses in Lelant churchyard

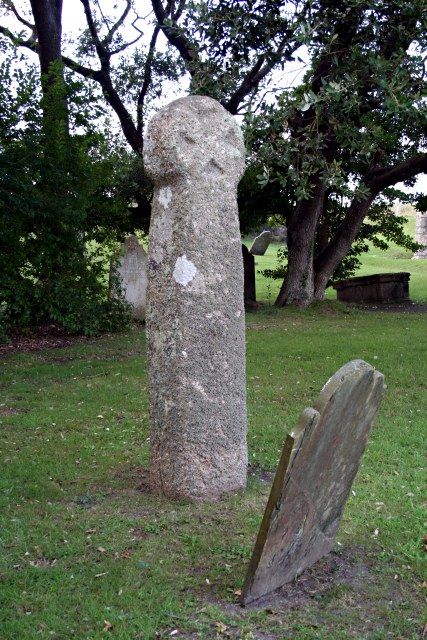
Fig. d13: another cross in Lelant churchyard

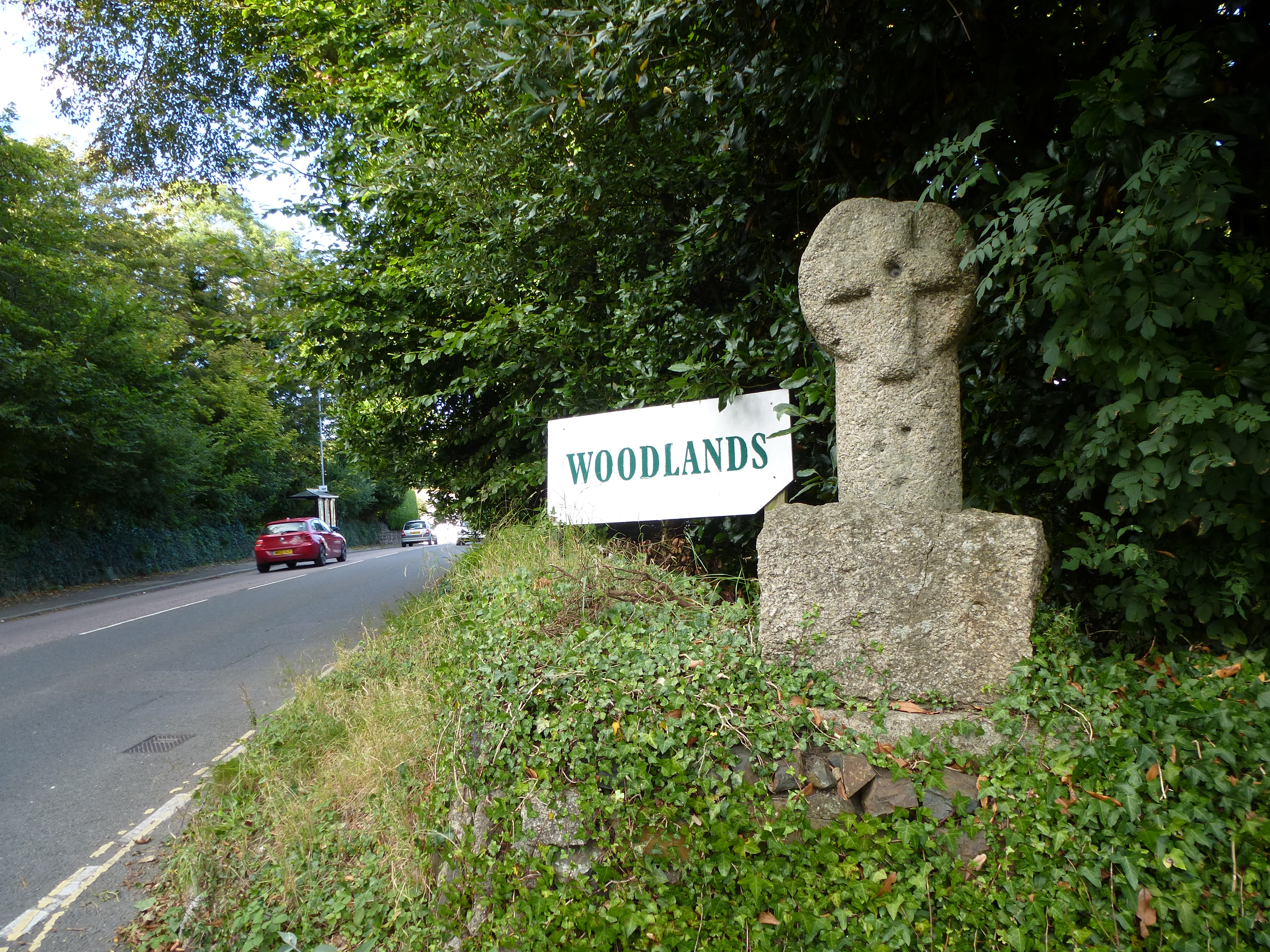
Fig. d14: Woodlands cross, Lelant

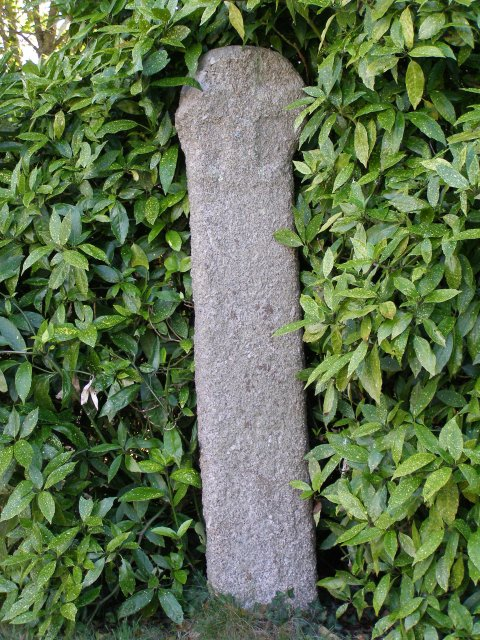
Fig. d15: the tall Cornish cross in the churchyard of Ludgvan

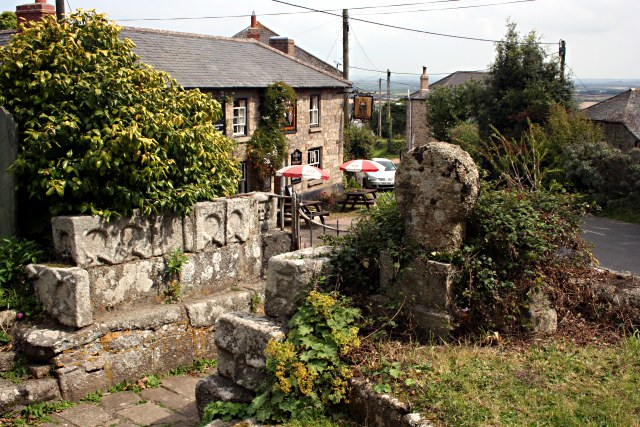
Fig. d16: the short Cornish cross in the churchyard of Ludgvan

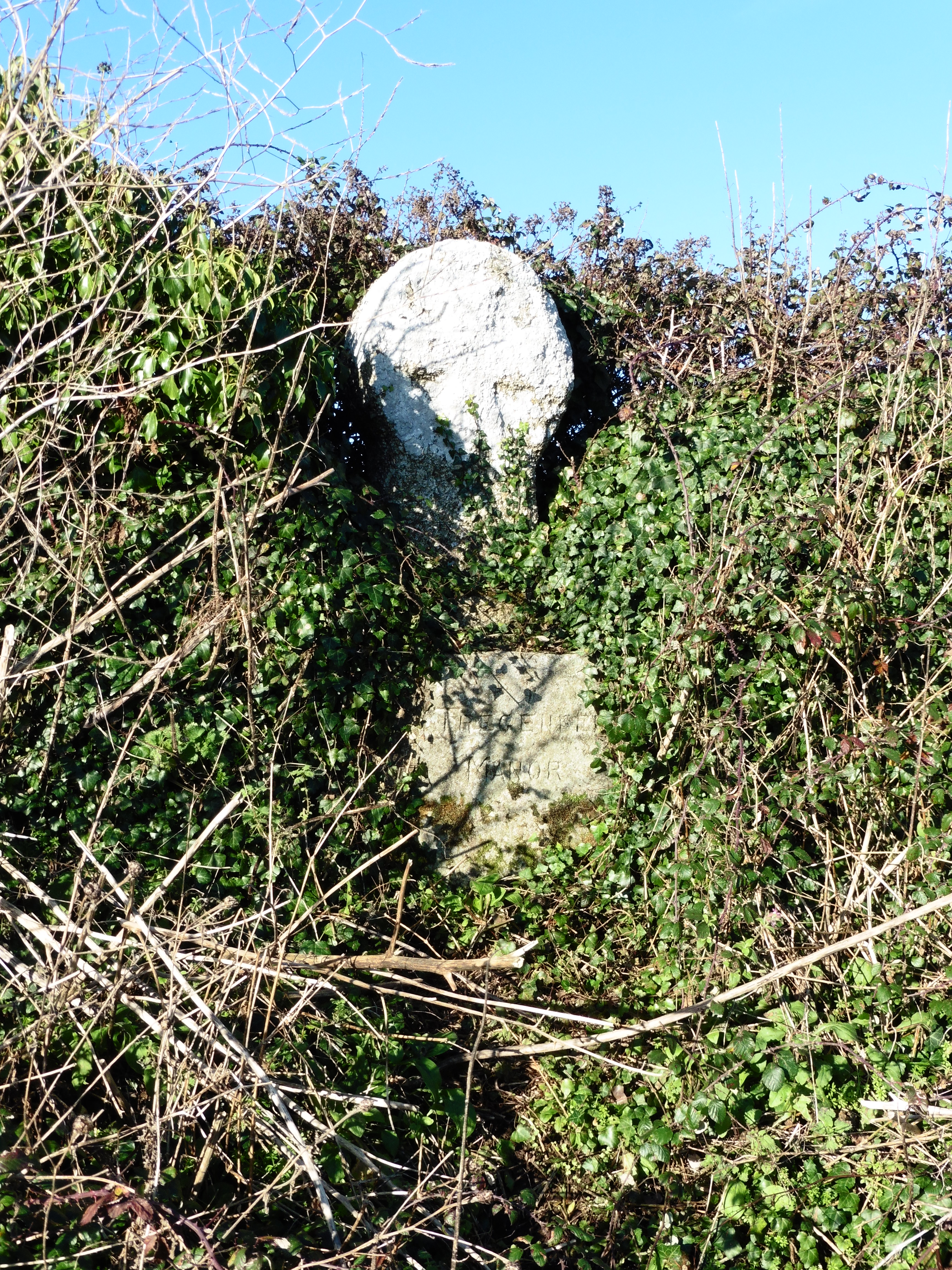
Fig. d17: the cross at Crowlas

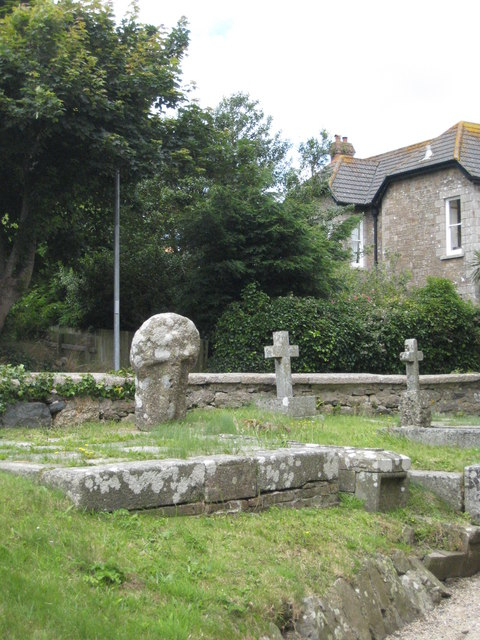
Fig. d18: the churchyard cross of Madron

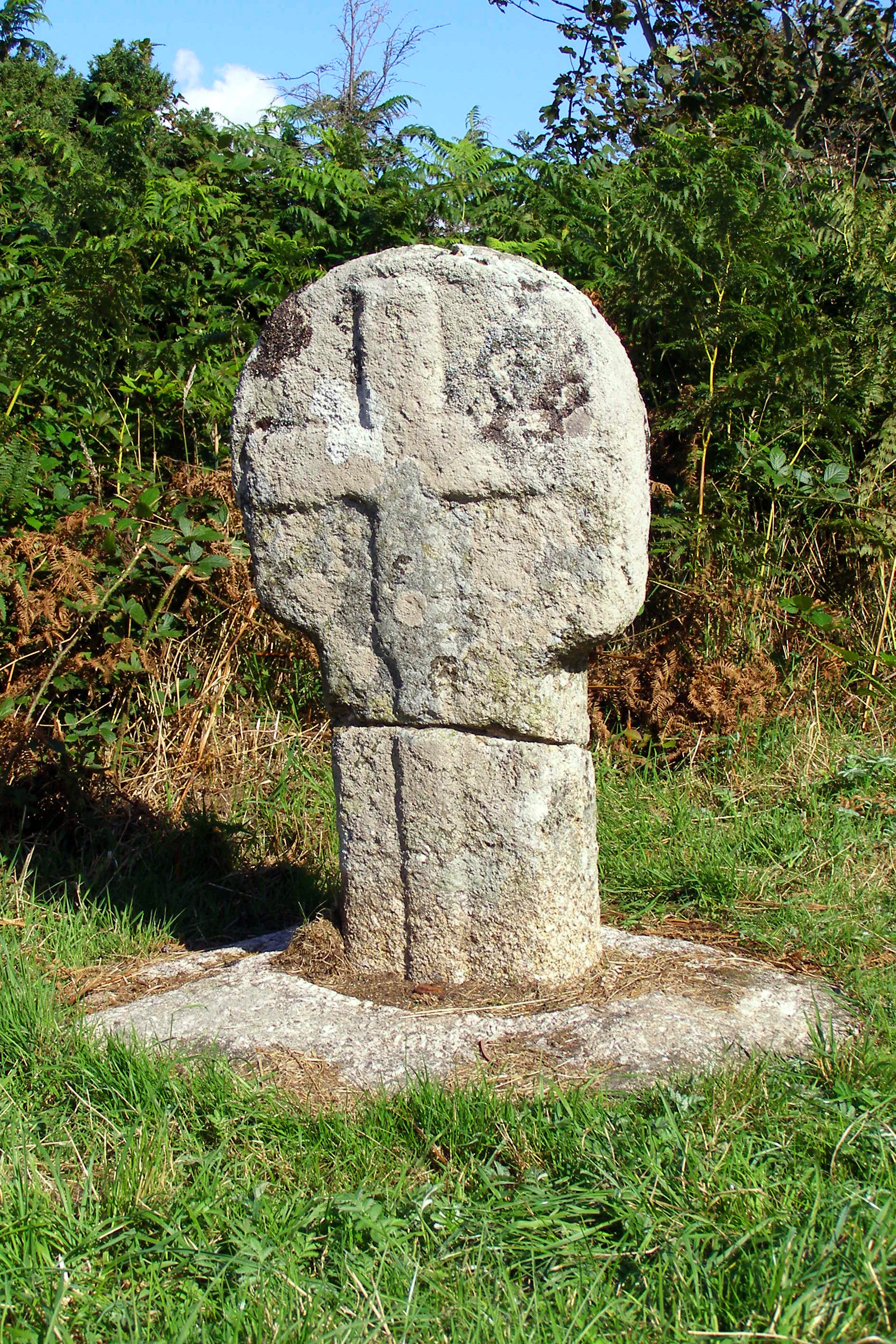
Fig. d19: Boswarthen cross

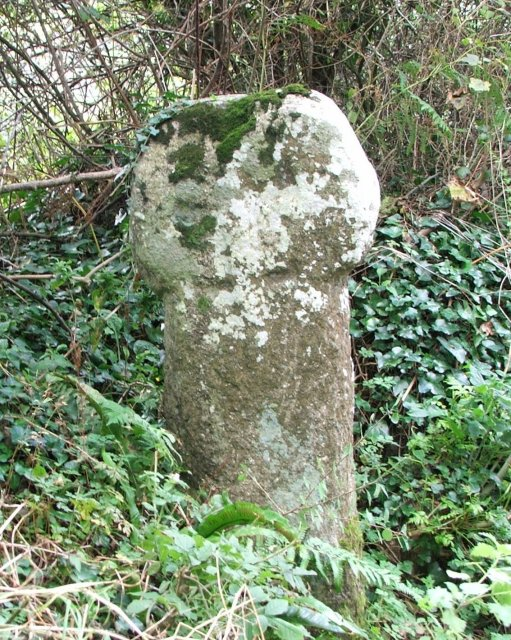
Fig. d20: Trembath Cross

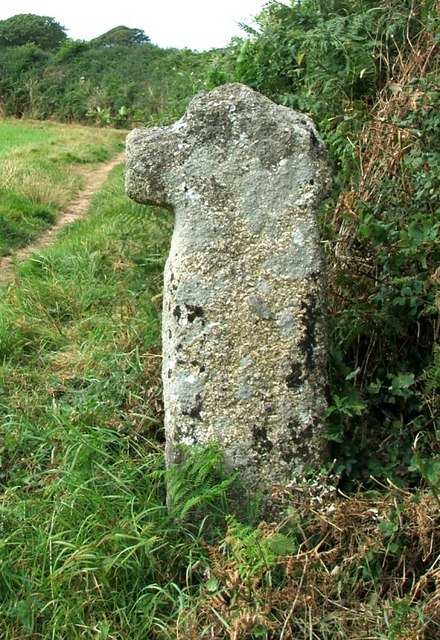
Fig. d21: Boscathnoe Cross

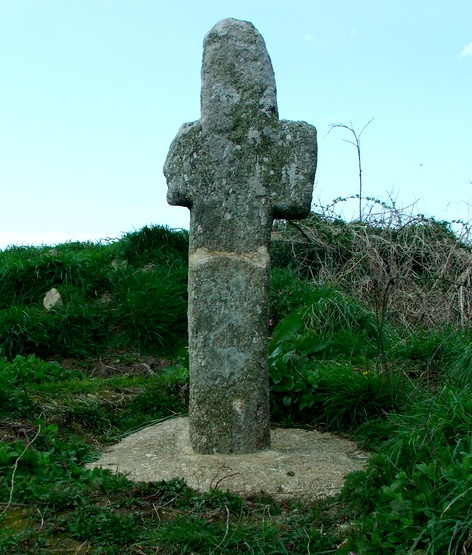
Fig. d21a: Tremethick Cross

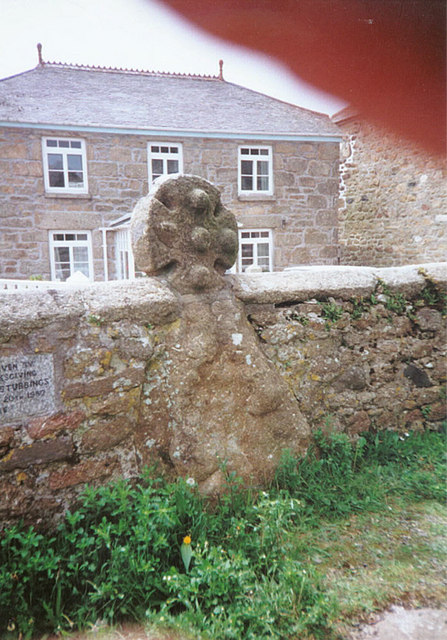
Fig. d22: the cross on the churchyard wall at Paul

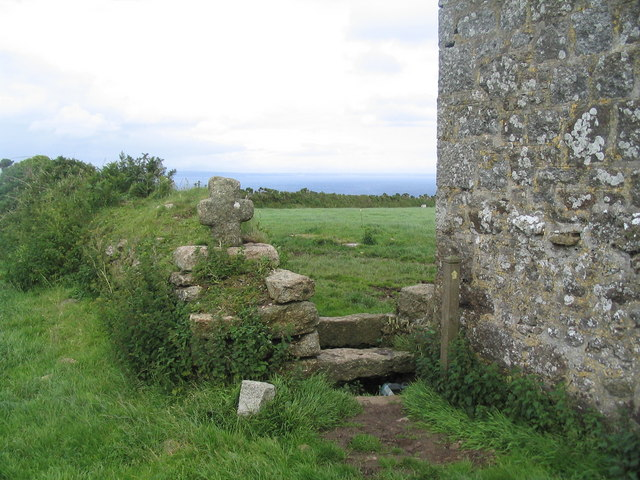
Fig. d23: a cross at Kemyel Drea near Castallack

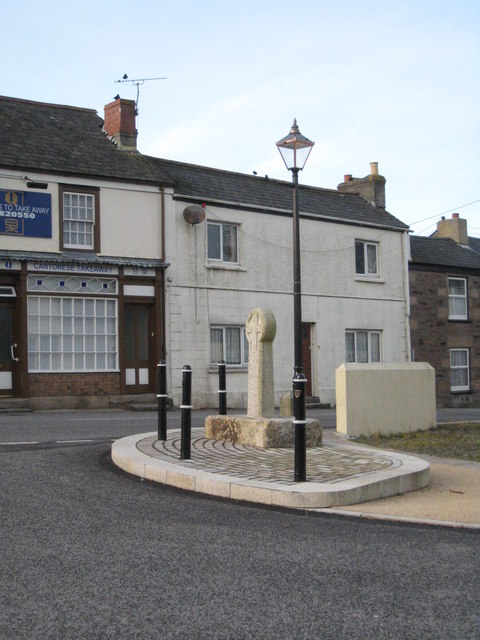
Fig. d24: the cross at Carharrack

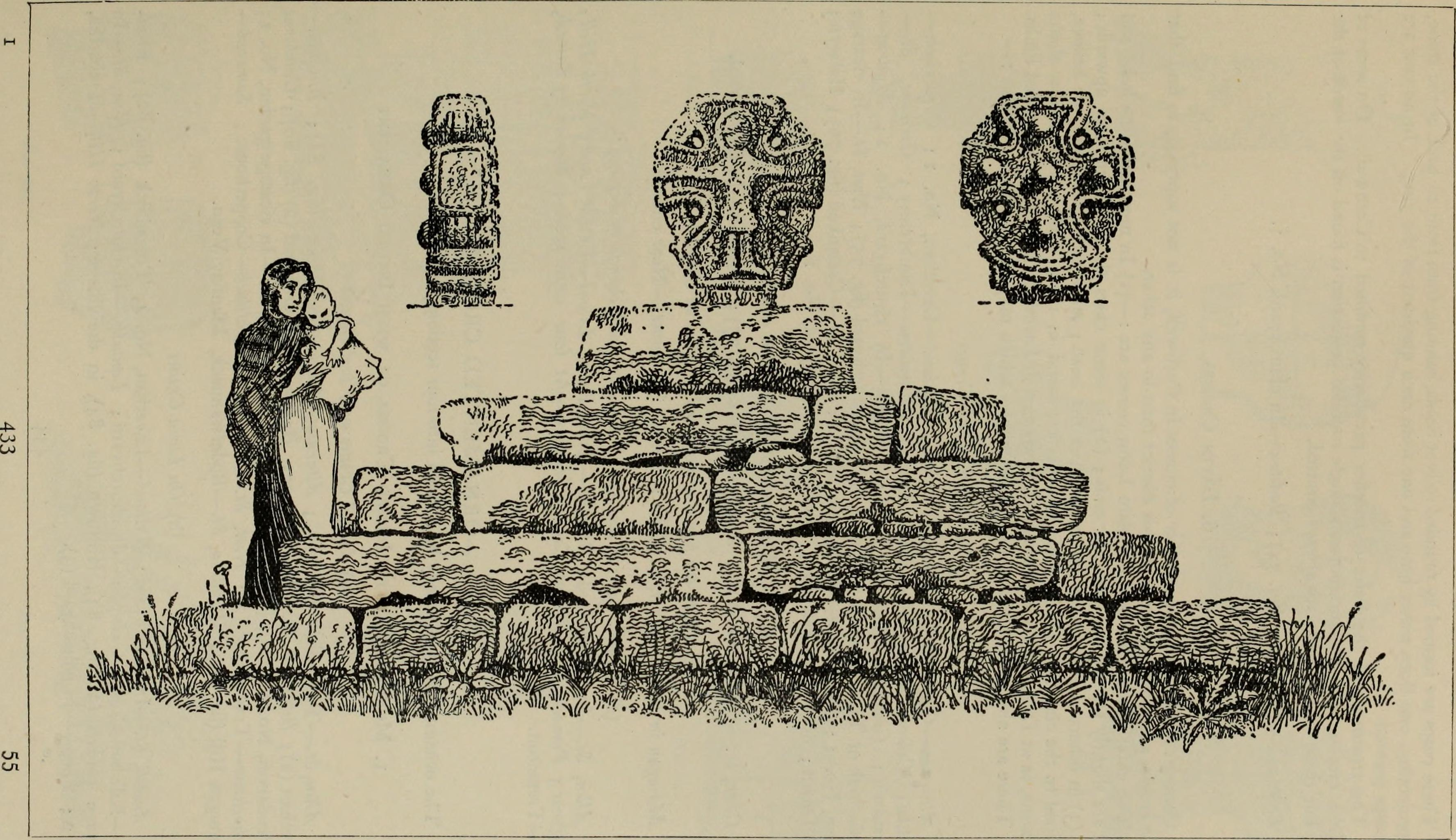
Fig. d25: one of the crosses in the churchyard of St Buryan

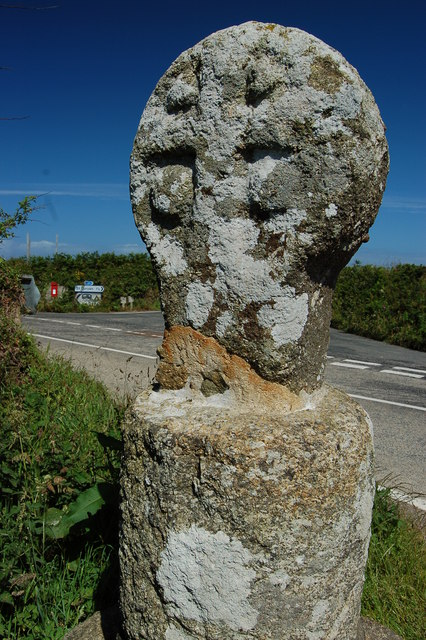
Fig. d26: Boskenna cross

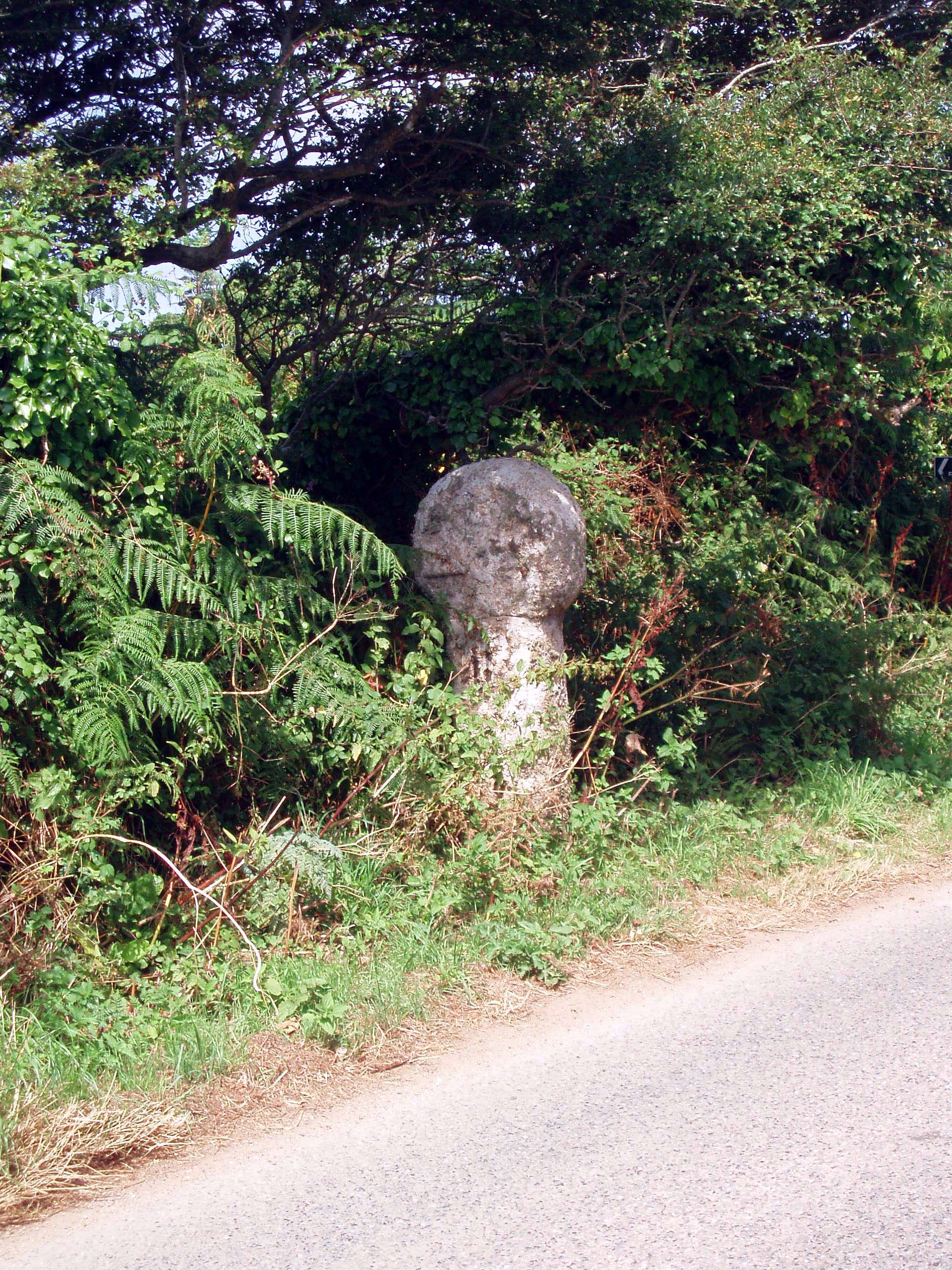
Fig. d27: a cross near St Loy's Cove

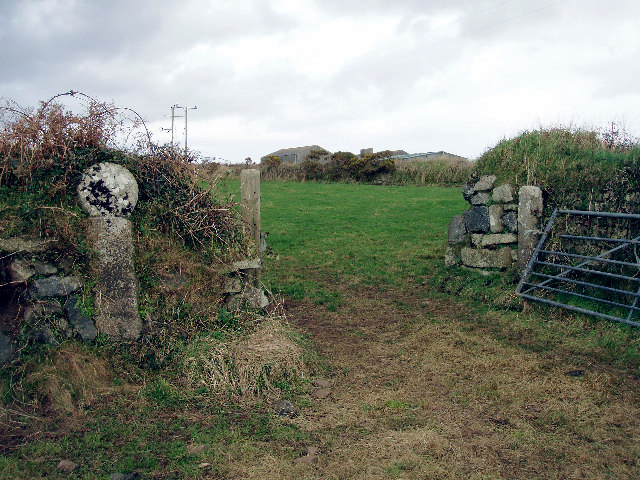
Fig. d28: a cross near Down's Barn Farm, St Buryan

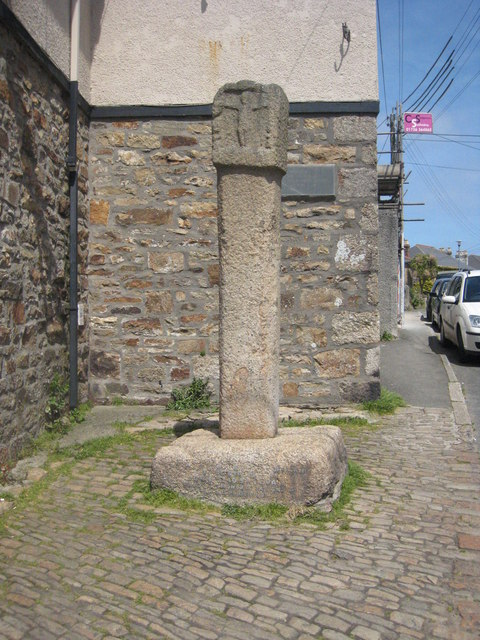
Fig. d29: a cross at St Erth

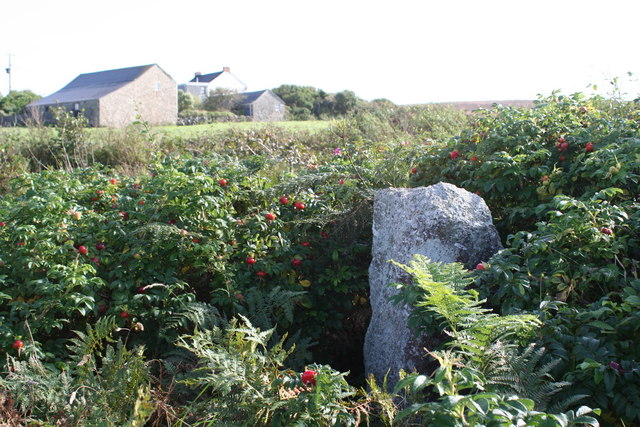
Fig. d30: the cross at Leswidden

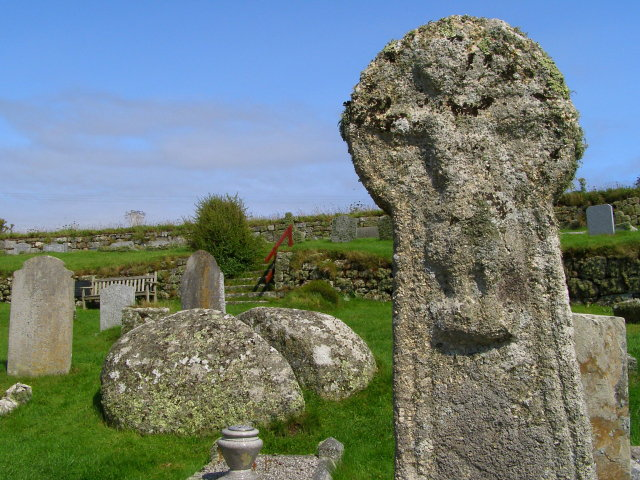
Fig. d31: the cross in the churchyard of St Levan

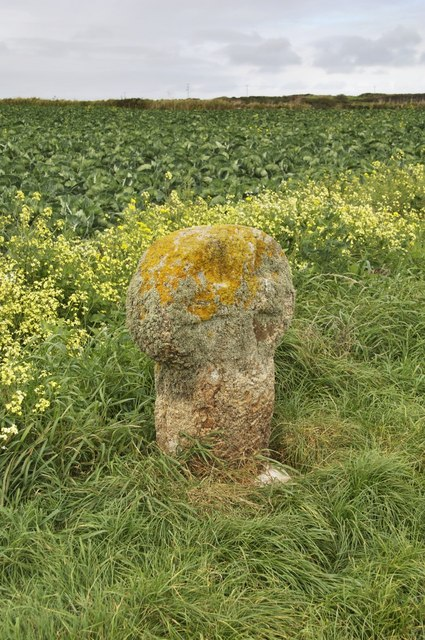
Fig. d32: the cross at Rospletha

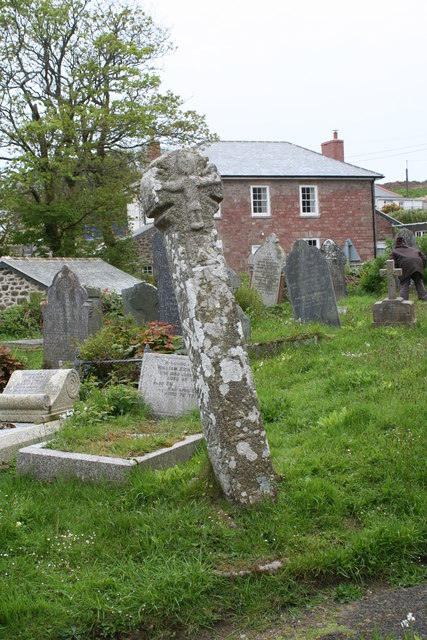
Fig. d33 a cross in Sancreed churchyard

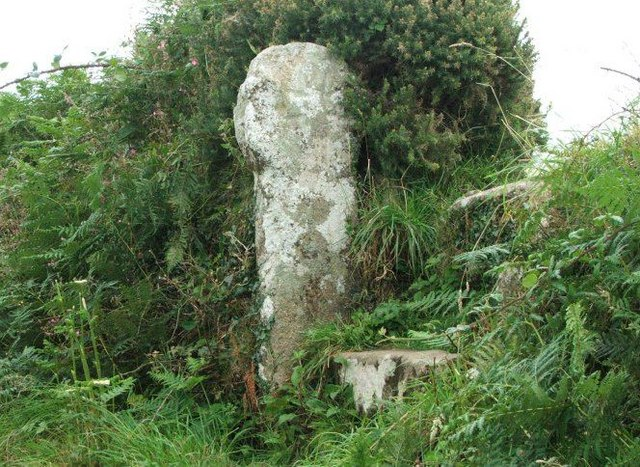
Fig. d34: Brane cross

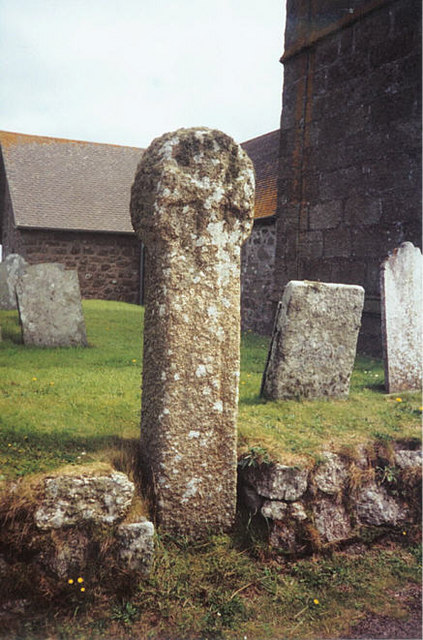
Fig. d35: a Cornish cross in the cemetery, Sennen

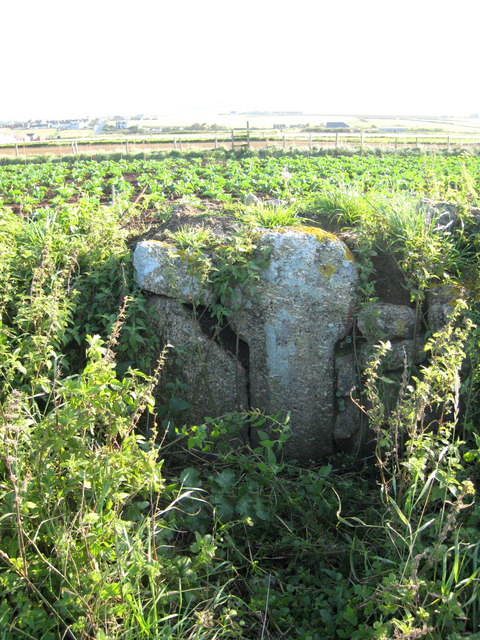
Fig. d36: a cross at Mayon Farm, Sennen

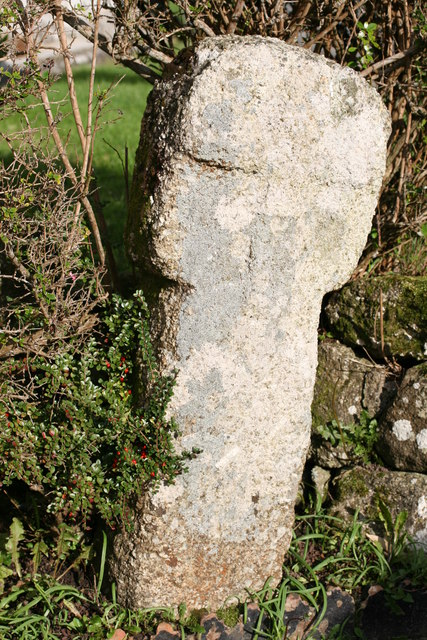
Fig. d37: a Cornish cross in the churchyard of Towednack

== Crosses in Powder hundred ==
Parishes C - L

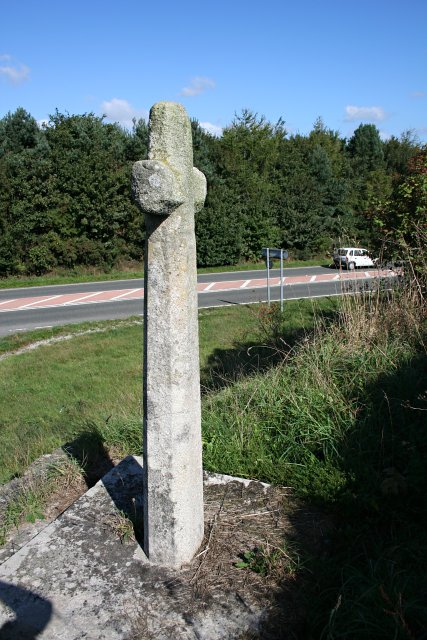
Fig. e1: Nancor Cross, by a road junction east of Grampound

Creed-with-Grampound: Dr. Reginald Merther-derwa, rector of Creed in 1423–47 left a will providing for the erection of a series of stone crosses at Camborne. The five similar stone crosses in Creed parish, including one now at Grampound church, may also have been due to him. Merther-derwa's will says "New stone crosses to be put up of the usual kind in those parts of Cornwall from Kayar Reslasek to Camborne church where dead bodies are rested on the way to their burial, that prayers may be made and the bearers take some rest". As there are no Gothic stone crosses in Camborne or adjacent parishes it is likely that these crosses were set up at Creed instead. In Creed parish there are the remains of four 15th-century crosses, three of which were cut from Pentewan stone. The market cross of Grampound is more ornate than the other three crosses. Fair Cross is a Gothic cross shaft. Nancor Cross has a cross head which was found in the 1920s near Nancor Farm; it was later set on a new shaft and erected beside the A390 road. In 1995 it was broken into four pieces but repaired in 1996. The fourth cross consists only of a cross base at Creed Lane.

There are two Cornish crosses in the parish of Feock: one is in the churchyard and the other at Trelissick. The cross in the churchyard probably dates from the 13th century (it has a crude crucifixus figure on one side of the head and a foliated cross on the other). The cross at Trelissick was moved from Tredrea in the parish of St Erth in the 1840s; it has a crude crucifixus figure on the front of the head but the back is defaced.

There is a fine Cornish cross in the churchyard of Gerrans. According to Andrew Langdon (1994) this cross was not originally a churchyard cross but a wayside cross. No other ancient stone cross exists in the Roseland Peninsula; however a cross called Penpirthe Cross is shown on the parish terrier of 1613 as standing on the boundary of the parishes of Gerrans and Philleigh.

Arthur Langdon (1896) describes a Cornish cross in the manor house grounds at Eastbourne, Sussex, which was originally at Kenwyn. Davies Gilbert, a former resident of the manor house removed it from a roadside gate west of Truro where it was in use as a gatepost and had it transported to Eastbourne in 1817. The shaft is ornamented on all four sides.

The churchyard cross at Lamorran is a fine example of a Gothic stone cross. This cross is made of Pentewan stone; the crosshead is now incomplete as the upper limb is missing.

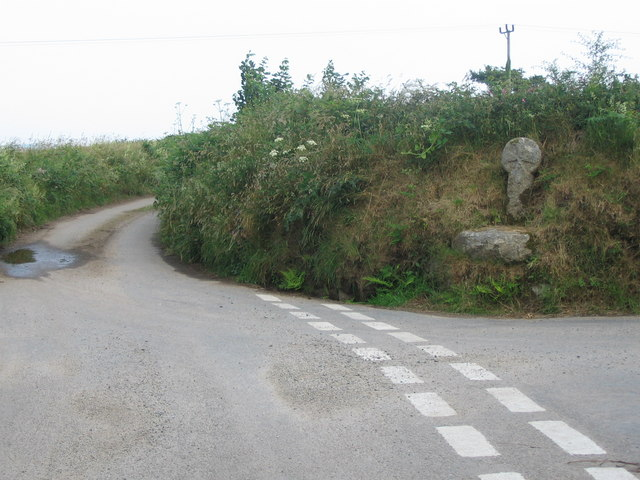
Fig. e2: Sandyway Cross

There are four stone crosses in the parish of Lanlivery: Trethew Cross consists of a crosshead which was found in 1900 and a separate base; Trevorry or Sandyway Cross was found in 1936; Menawink Cross is a cross with a mutilated head which was found c. 1990 and erected shortly thereafter on the opposite side of the road; Crewel Cross was first reported in 1870 built into a stile (in 1900 the two separate parts were joined together and erected on a base). Two stone crosses from Lanlivery were removed in the 1840s and turned into monuments: one was taken to Boconnoc and one to St Winnow.

Arthur Langdon (1896) recorded three Cornish crosses and one cross base in the parish of Luxulyan. One cross is in the churchyard (illustrated above right); it was brought there in the 19th century from Three Stiles near Consence. Another cross is at Methrose and the third at Trevellan (lying horizontally and built into a hedge). The cross base is at Trevellan Lane End. Andrew Langdon (1994) does not mention the cross at Methrose. Trevellan Cross was removed from the hedge and erected at Lockengate in 1903; in 1972 it was moved a few yards to the crossroads on the A391.

Parishes M - V

There is a small Cornish cross on top of the church wall at Tresillian, Merther.

Trelowthas Cross was found in the 1940s at Trelowthas in the parish of Probus. Great Trelowthas was the site of one of the medieval chapels in the parish, recorded as licensed in 1379. Probus was one of four places in Cornwall having a right of sanctuary which extended beyond the walls of the church, the others being Padstow, St Keverne and St Buryan. The missing Carvossa cross is thought to have marked the eastern limit of sanctuary and it is likely that this cross marked the western limit.

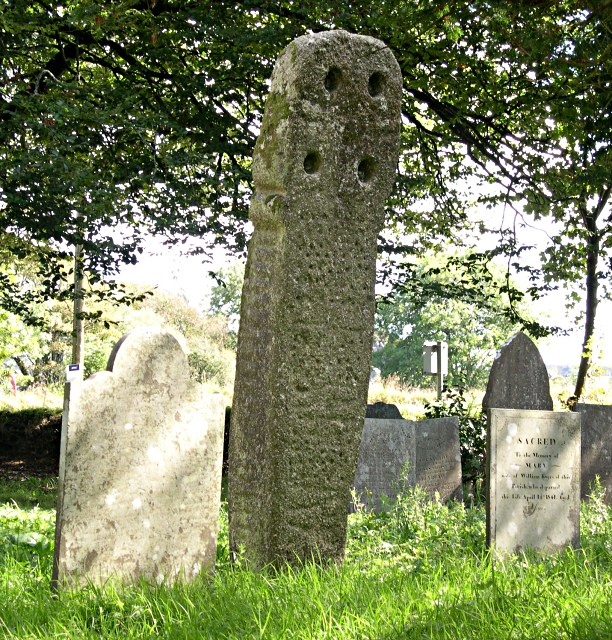
Fig. e3: the churchyard cross at Roche

There are two Cornish crosses in the parish of Roche: one in a meadow near the rectory garden is thought to be in situ; the other in the churchyard has ornament on the four sides of the shaft. The churchyard cross is made of a massive piece of moorland granite; it has similarities to the cross in the graveyard at Merther Uny. Glebe Cross has crosses in relief on either face of the cross head.

The Old Rectory cross at Ruan Lanihorne is a small Gothic latin cross in the grounds of the Old Rectory. It was found buried in the churchyard before 1920 and taken to what was then the new rectory.

There is a Cornish cross in the churchyard of St Austell which was found buried in the ground on the manor of Treverbyn in 1879. This cross was erected in the churchyard on a new base in 1879. Another cross is in the grounds of a house originally known as Moor Cottage. This house was built in 1819; the cross was brought from Hewas in the parish of Ladock.

The Biscovey Stone, St Blazey, is the shaft of an ancient Celtic cross. It was inscribed, but the text is no longer readable. There are several theories about the stone; one says it dates from around 600 AD to show the Saxon advance into the county, another puts the date at around 900 AD. The head is thought to have been removed during the Reformation. The stone served as a gate post near the St Blazey turnpike gate. In 1896 it was moved to St Mary's Church, Biscovey. Arthur Langdon described the stone in 1896: he read the inscription as "+ Alroron Ullici + filius". It was also described by William Borlase in his Antiquities of Cornwall (1754), pp. 363–64.

The churchyard cross of St Dennis has a head of horseshoe shape and is ornamented with some unusual incised ornament.

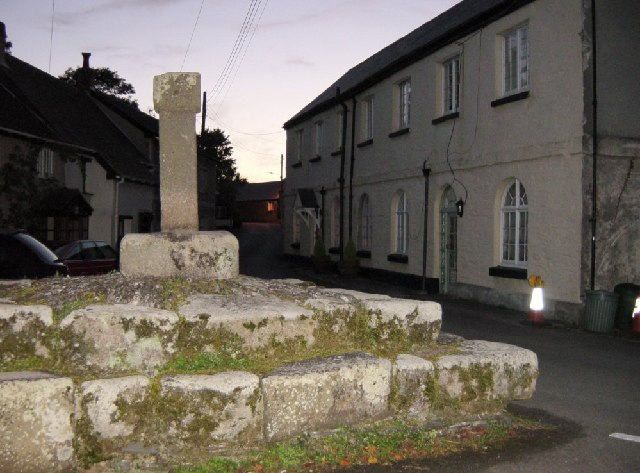
Fig. e4: St Ewe Cross

A roadside Celtic cross once stood near Nunnery Hill, St Ewe (Charles Henderson in 1925 refers to it being at Lanhadron). However, the crosshead and shaft were thrown down in 1873 by a farmer looking for buried treasure, and both pieces were afterwards lost. The base has survived in situ with an inscription in insular script, unreadable except for the word crucem; Elisabeth Okasha dates the construction of this monument between the ninth and eleventh centuries. There is another cross at Corran, about half a mile east of the churchtown. This cross is also known as Beacon Cross since its site is known as the Beacon. There is a cross at Heligan known as Bokiddick Cross; it came from Bokiddick Farm in the parish of Lanivet which was then owned by the Tremaynes who also owned Heligan. The cross in the churchtown stands on a massive base which is the only original part of it. The stones forming the cross came from elsewhere and nothing is known about the design of the original cross.

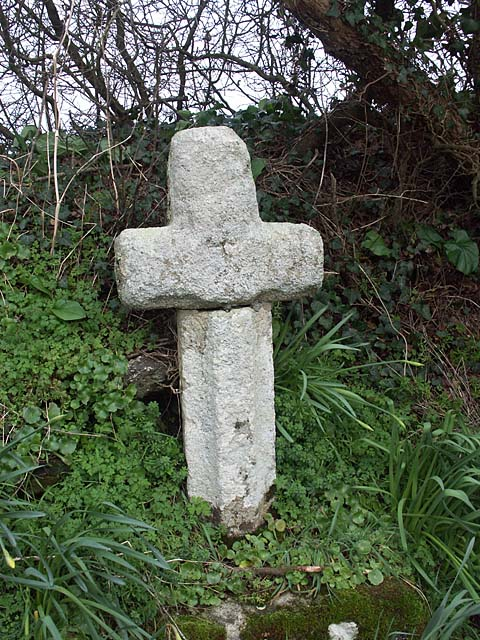
Fig. e5: Fentongollan Cross

Fentongollan Cross is a wayside Latin cross in the parish of St Michael Penkevil. Only the upper part of the cross is original. Another cross from this parish was taken to Canada in the 19th century and still exists at Greensville, Flamborough, Ontario.

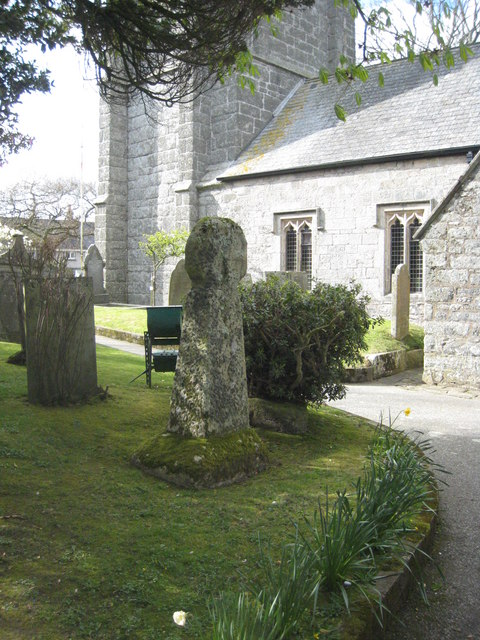
Fig. e6: Treneague Cross in St Stephen's churchyard; an old cross head set on a 19th-century shaft

Treneague Cross (illustrated Fig. e5) in the parish of St Stephen-in-Brannel consists of an ancient cross head mounted on a modern shaft. The cross head was found at Treneague at the end of the 19th century and afterwards attached to a new shaft and set up in the churchyard. Treneague was the site of a chapel which was licensed in 1381.

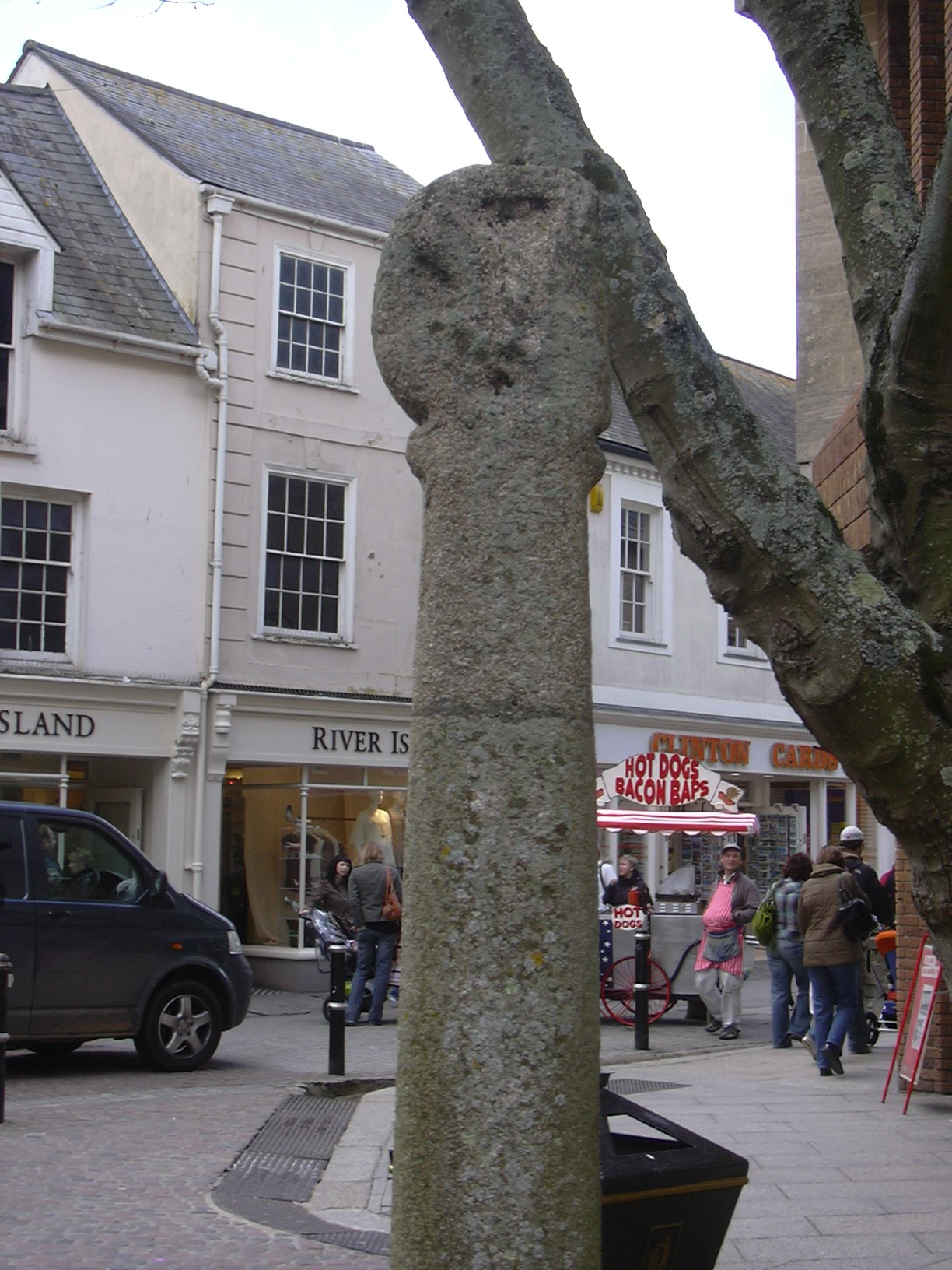
Fig. e7: the cross at High Cross

At the edge of High Cross near Pydar Street in Truro, there is an ancient Celtic cross. A cross in Truro was mentioned in a document of 1290. In 1958 during excavations in St Nicholas Street the upper section of a stone cross was found and placed next to the museum. In 1981 it was erected outside the Marks and Spencer store. After it had been extended with a piece of Hantergantick granite it was re-erected at High Cross in 1988 and dedicated in 1992. It is likely that the cross originally at High Cross was a Gothic latin cross and that this cross was originally a simple wayside cross.

The vicarage cross at Veryan consists of an ancient shaft with a modern base and cross head; it was erected early in the 20th century.

== Crosses in Pydar hundred ==
Parishes C - L

In Colan churchyard is a 15th-century Gothic cross. This cross, which was untraced for many years, was found near a hedge in 1908 by Dr. W. J. Stephens of the Old Cornwall Society. Initially, it was claimed by owners of the property where it was found. In 1970, the Newquay Old Cornwall Society intervened and were successful in having the cross installed in the churchyard.

A Cornish cross stands against the wall of the north transept of Cubert parish church. The small cross head was brought to the churchyard about 1860 from Ellenglaze Lane and mounted on a shaft brought from outside the churchyard.

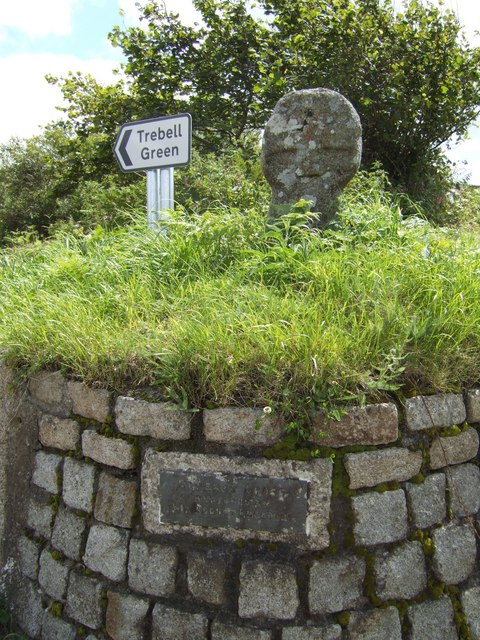
Fig. f1: Reperry Cross

There are two Cornish crosses and two cross bases (at Tredinnick Cross and Reperry) in the parish of Lanhydrock. One cross is in the churchyard (illustrated Fig. f5) and the other is half a cross head at Treffry. The cross in the churchyard is ornamented on all four sides of the shaft. Of the Reperry Cross only the base remains but the cross was illustrated in the Gentleman's Magazine, vol. 75 (1805). In addition to these there is a cross called Bodwen Cross; this cross was recorded in 1850 but was not mentioned by J. T. Blight or Arthur Langdon. It was found again in 1937 near Helman Tor in the parish of Lanlivery. It was taken from there and erected in the new cemetery at Lanhydrock. A request for it to be returned to Lanlivery to a site on the Saints' Way was refused.

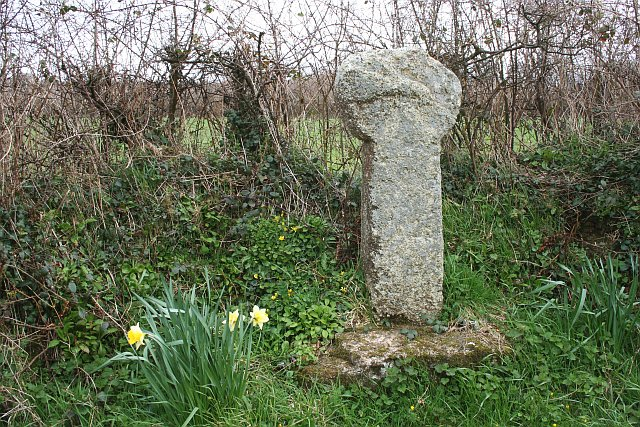
Fig. f2: Fenton Pits Cross

In the churchyard of Lanivet are two ancient stone crosses (illustrated Fig. f6) and a rare example of a hogback grave dating from Viking times. Arthur G. Langdon (1896) also records the existence of four more stone crosses in the parish. Andrew Langdon (1994) records 13 crosses: two in the churchyard and Bodwannick Cross, Reperry Cross, St Ingunger Cross (illustrated Fig. f8), Fenton Pits Cross, Lesquite Cross (illustrated Fig. f7), Treliggan Cross, Laninval Cross, Tremore Cross, Woodley Cross, St Benet's Cross and Lamorick Cross.

Parishes P - W

There are two Cornish crosses in the parish of Padstow: one is built into a wall in the old vicarage garden and another is at Prideaux Place (consisting of a four-holed head and part of an ornamented cross shaft). There is also part of a decorated cross shaft in the churchyard.

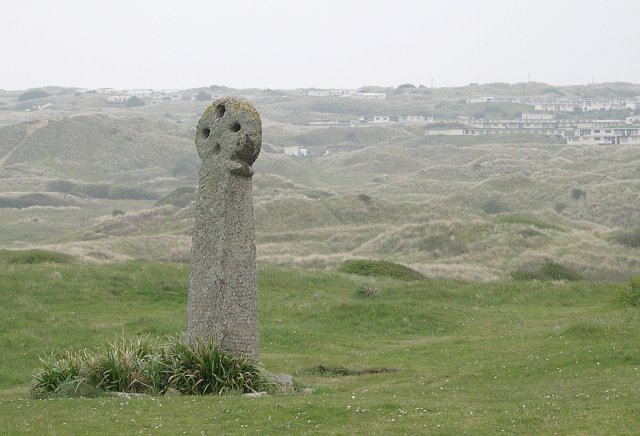
Fig. f3: St Piran's cross, Perranzabuloe; this cross has been dated by Charles Henderson as before 960 AD

St Piran's Cross at Perranzabuloe (believed to be the earliest recorded stone cross in Cornwall) stands in the dunes between the oratory site and the graveyard of the old church. It is dedicated to tinners and miners and stands 8 feet (2.4 m) high. Arthur Langdon suggested that the shaft had once been ornamented but the ornament had not survived because of the poor quality of the granite.

Arthur Langdon (1896) recorded four Cornish crosses in the parish of St Allen: one at the farm of Lower Town is buried upside down in the ground; the others are defaced crosses at Tolcarn, Trefronick and Trevalsa. Andrew Langdon (1994) also recorded four crosses as well as a font adapted from a Gothic cross base. Three of these crosses (illustrated Fig. f9, f10 & f11) are in the churchyard, of which one was removed from Trefronick Farm in 1911. Andrew Langdon (citing a 1913 paper by William J. Stephens in the Journal of the Royal Institution of Cornwall) notes that Arthur Langdon had described the same cross twice, as Trevalsa cross and Lower Town cross are the same.

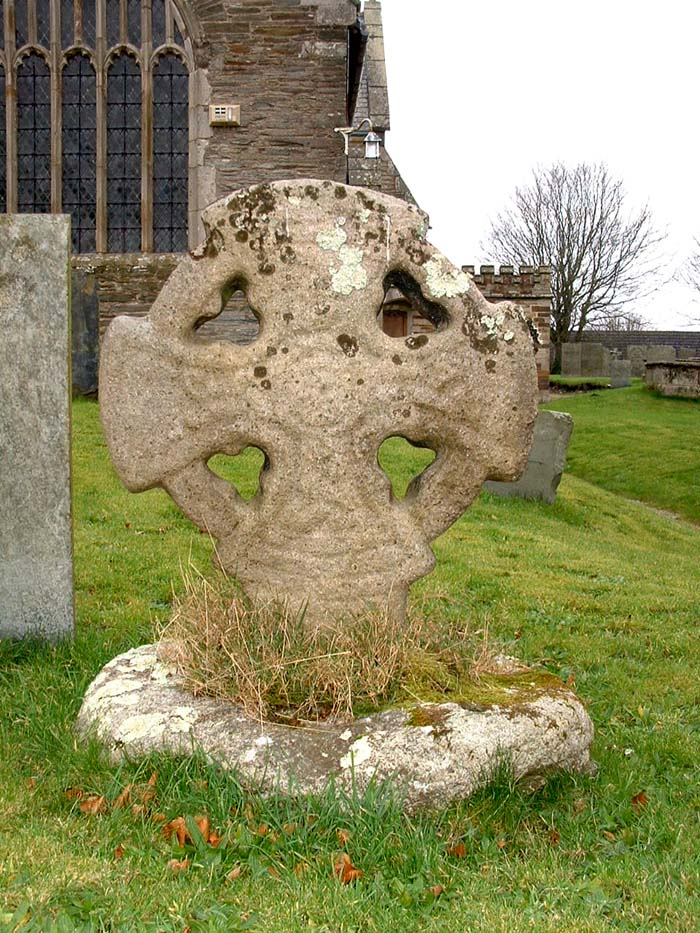
Fig. f4: A cross in St Columb churchyard

There are four Cornish crosses in the parish of St Columb Major: two are in the churchyard (one of these is St Columba's Cross; illustrated Fig. f12), one is at the hamlet of Black Cross and another (defaced) at Black Rock. In 1856 the old college buildings next to St Columb church were pulled down and a stone cross from the site was rescued and re-erected near the church door.

As of 1896 there were a Cornish cross and four cross bases in the parish of St Columb Minor: the cross was at Cross Close and is unusual in being almost circular in section. This cross, known as Double Stiles or Three Stiles Cross (illustrated, Fig. f13) was moved to a new position when a housing estate was built in 1954. A cross formerly at Lavethan, Blisland, was sold in 1991 and set up in a cottage garden in Newquay.

There is a stone cross in the churchyard of St Enoder which was found beside the road from the churchtown to Fraddon. It was set up in the churchyard in 1879 but moved to a different position in the churchyard in 1893.

Arthur Langdon (1896) recorded two Cornish crosses in the parish of St Mawgan: one, a small cross, is at Mawgan Cross and the other at Lanherne. The Lanherne cross is a highly ornamented example and stands in the grounds of the nunnery having been brought from Roseworthy in the parish of Gwinear. "It is the most beautiful specimen of an elaborately decorated cross in Cornwall." Andrew Langdon (1994) records four crosses. These are the Lanherne cross, the churchyard cross, Bodrean Cross and Mawgan Cross. The churchyard cross is the best preserved medieval lantern cross in Cornwall. Bodrean Cross (a cross head and small part of the shaft) was found in 1904 at Bodrean Farm in the parish of St Clement. In 1906 the cross head was provided with a new shaft and set up in St Mawgan churchyard.

The mutilated head of a medieval lantern cross was found buried in the churchyard of St Newlyn East in 1959. William Borlase left a description of a lantern cross he had seen at Treledra (Treluddra) Farm; it is probable that these two crosses are the same.

In the parish of St Wenn there is a Cornish cross at Cross and Hand, a place in the valley next to Castle-an-Dinas and in the extreme northwest of the parish. This cross (locally known as Crossy Ann) marks the boundary of the parishes of St Wenn, St Columb Major and Roche.

There are two Cornish crosses and a cross base in the parish of Withiel. One of the crosses is at a road junction about a mile south of the churchtown and the other in the rectory garden. The latter formerly stood in the road outside the rectory but was moved into the garden about 1860; it is in a good state of preservation. The former cross is called Inches Cross; it is thought that most of the cross shaft is buried in the ground.

Gallery

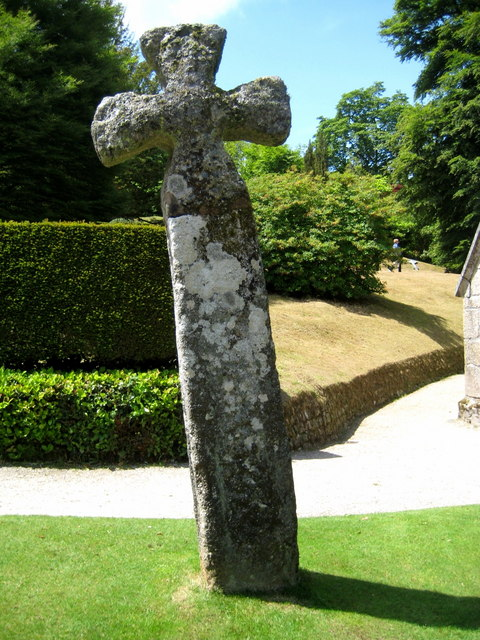
Fig. f5: the cross in the churchyard of Lanhydrock

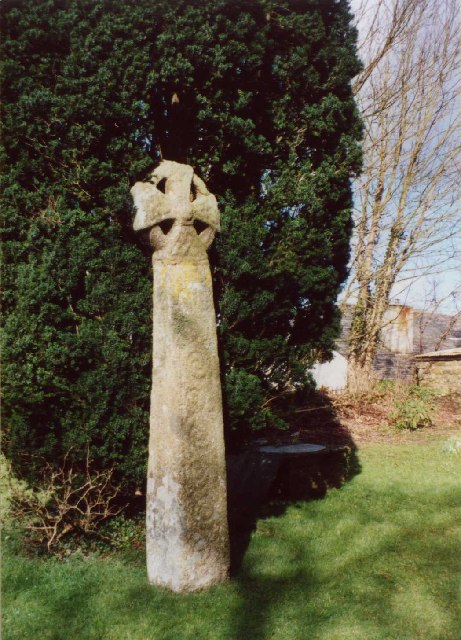
Fig. f6: the cross in Lanivet churchyard

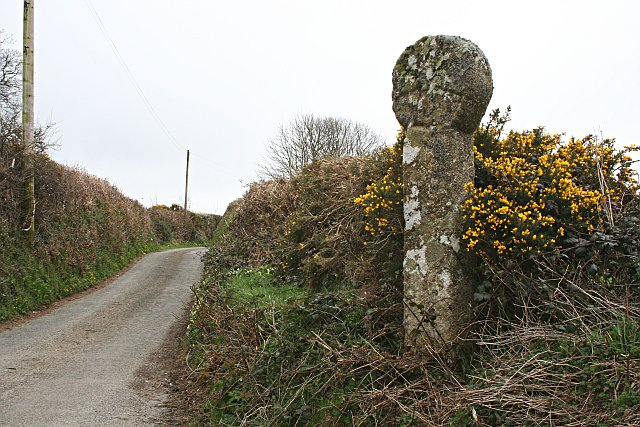
Fig. f7: Lesquite Cross

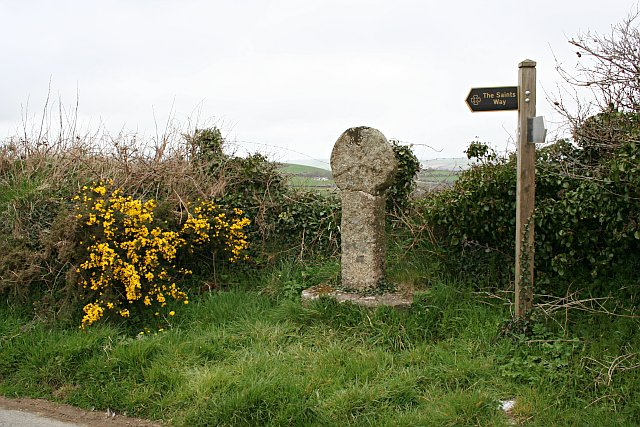
Fig. f8: St Ingunger Cross

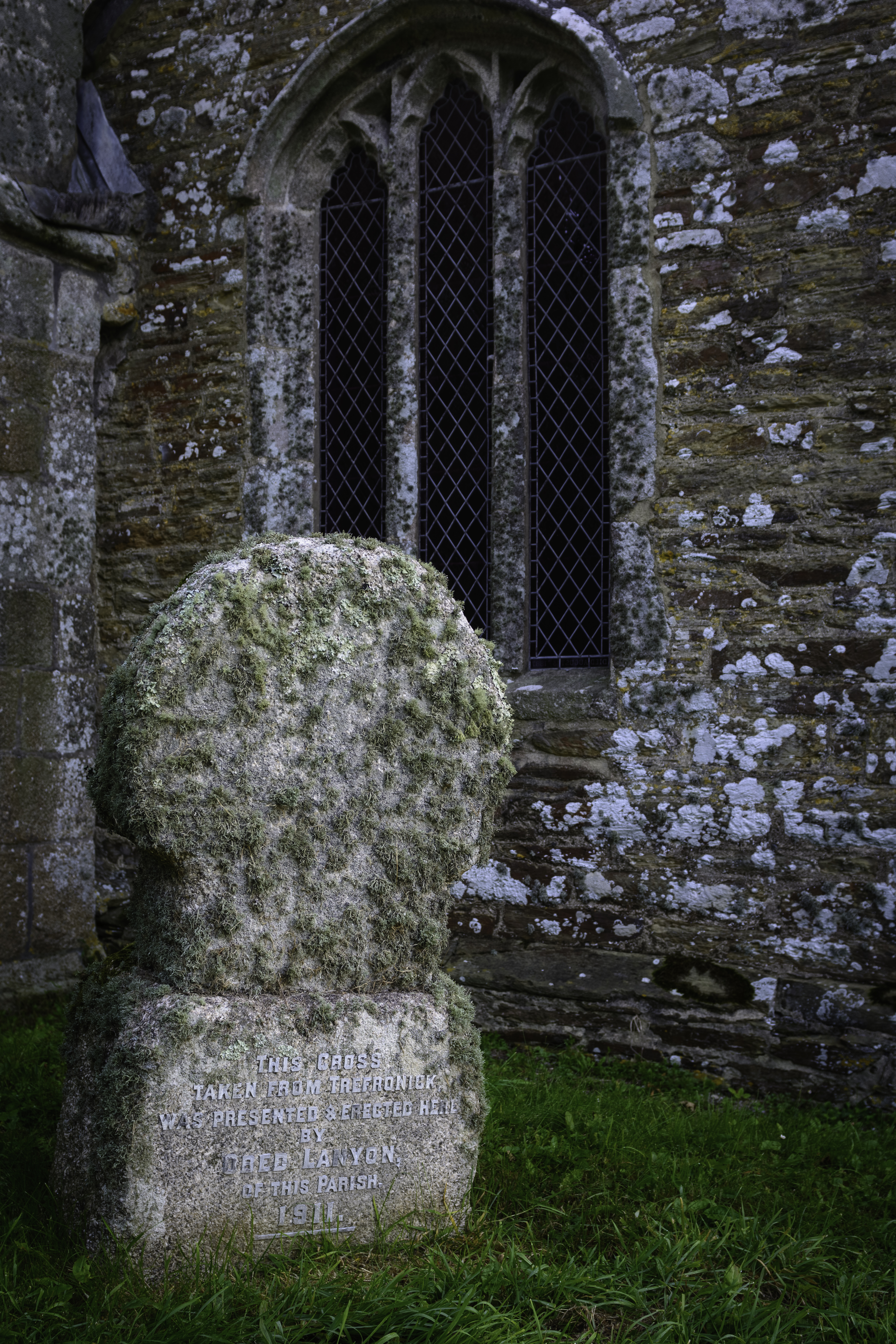
Fig. f9: Trefronick cross

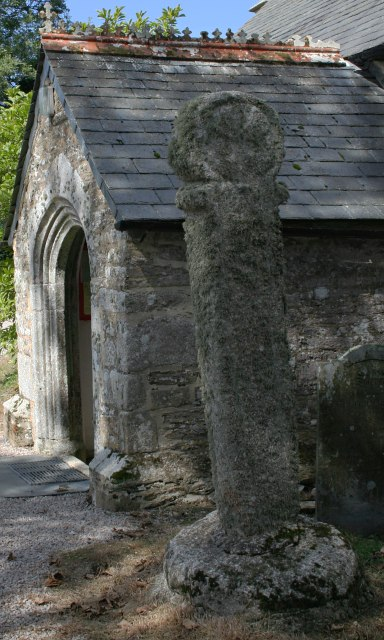
Fig. f10: a cross in the churchyard of St Allen

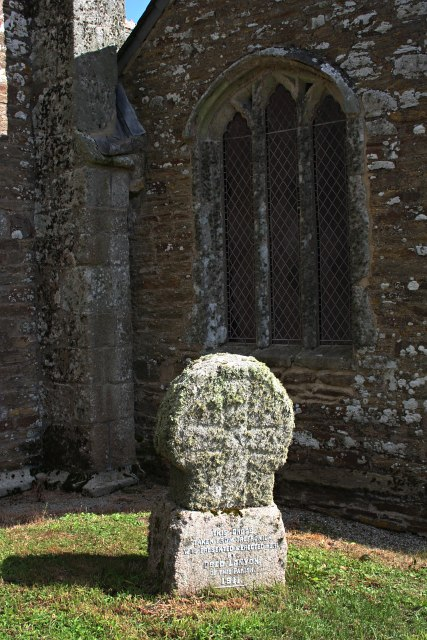
Fig. f11: another cross in the churchyard of St Allen

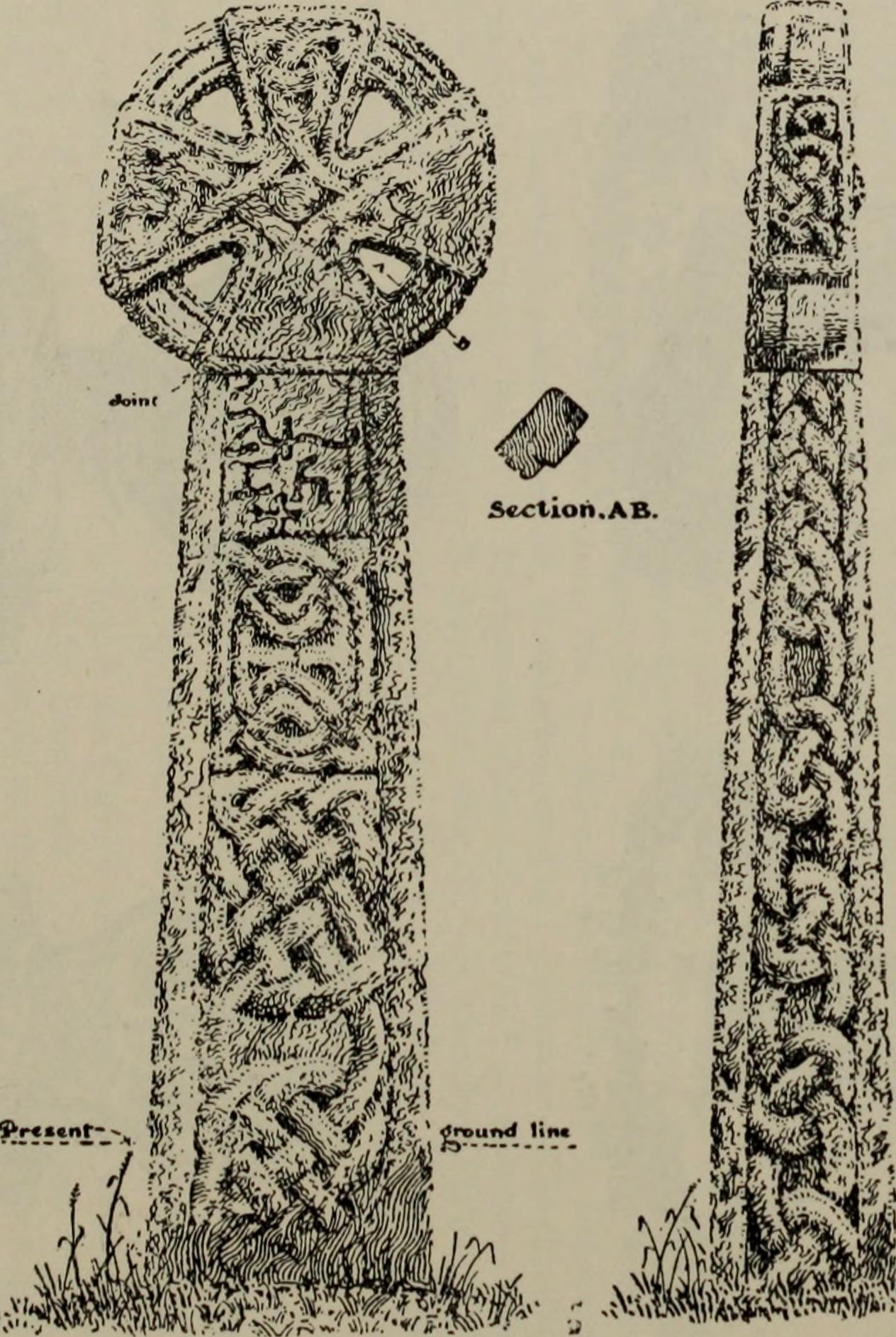
Fig. f12: St Columba's Cross

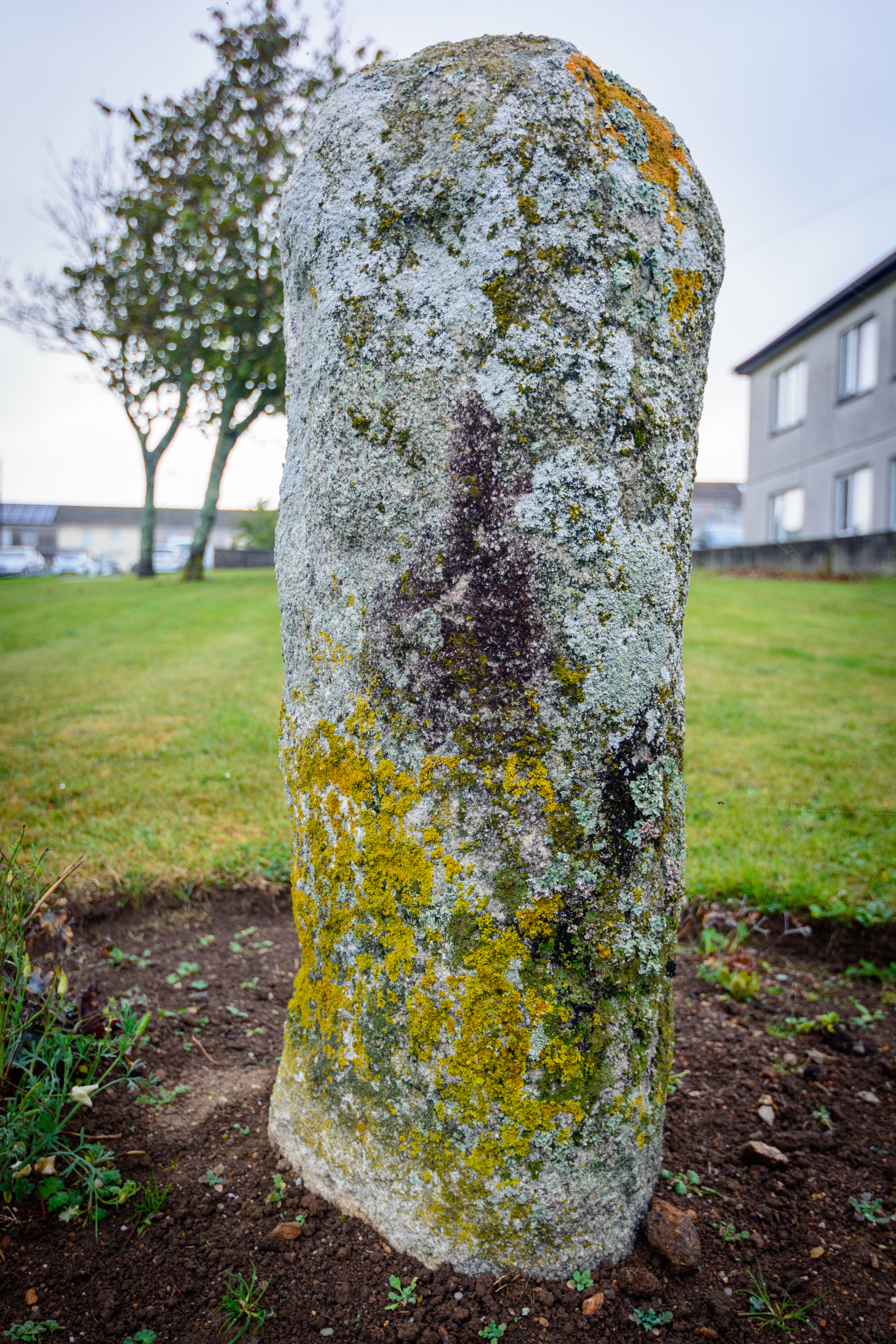
Fig. f13: Double Stiles Cross

Fig. f14: Bodwen Cross, Lanhydrock cemetery

== Crosses in Stratton hundred ==
In the churchyard of Morwenstow is a granite Celtic cross which is said to have been moved from a nearby moor by Parson Hawker to commemorate the death of his first wife, Charlotte. Her initials C E H are carved on the shaft. A round-headed Celtic cross was found at Tonacombe, Morwenstow, in the early 20th century; no round-headed cross was known north of Laneast before this one was found. This cross is Grade II* listed as "Red Cross Stone in Pleasaunce to the east of Tonacombe Manor".

== Crosses in Trigg hundred ==
Arthur Langdon (1896) records twelve stone crosses in the parish of Blisland, of which one is at St Pratt's Well and four are at Lavethan. Others are Peverell's cross and crosses at Cross Park, in the village, at Tregaddick and two crosses at Trewardale. Andrew Langdon (1996) records crosses at Cross Park, in the churchyard, in the village, as well as St Pratt's Cross, Peverall's Cross, one at Tregaddick, three at Lavethan and three at Trewardale.

Arthur Langdon (1896) records three Cornish crosses at Bodmin; one was near the Berry Tower, one was outside Bodmin Gaol and another was in a field near Castle Street Hill. Carminow Cross (illustrated Fig. g4) is a stone Celtic cross near a major road junction southeast of Bodmin. The cross is a Grade II* listed building. See also Fig. g3.

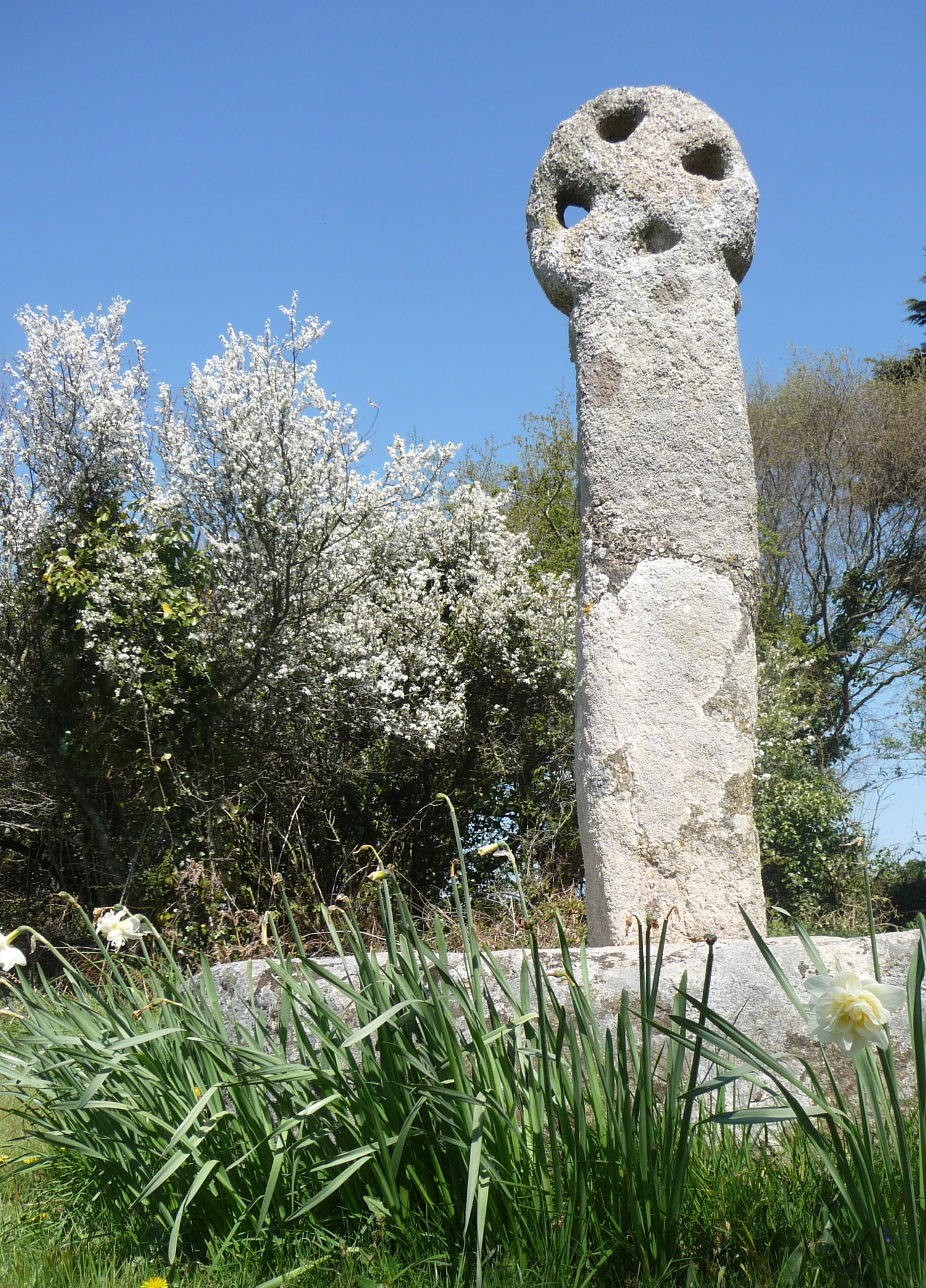
Fig. g1: Three Holes Cross

Arthur Langdon (1896) recorded that there were six stone crosses in the parish of Egloshayle, including two in the parish churchyard and one at Washaway. Three-holes Cross is about a mile and a half north of Egloshayle at a crossroads. A stone cross head (illustrated Fig. 1, bottom left) at Pencarrow was described by Arthur Langdon (1896). It was found c. 1870 on the estate and afterwards set up in the grounds.

Arthur Langdon (1896) records seven crosses and six cross-bases in the parish of St Breward: two of the crosses are at Lanke; other crosses are at Penvorder, Deaconstow and Middlemoor (illustrated Fig. g5).

There is a Cornish cross at Polrode Mill in the parish of St Kew; its original site is unknown and the head has been damaged. Job's Cross is on the road from Trewethern to St Kew (illustrated g8). See also Fig. g7.

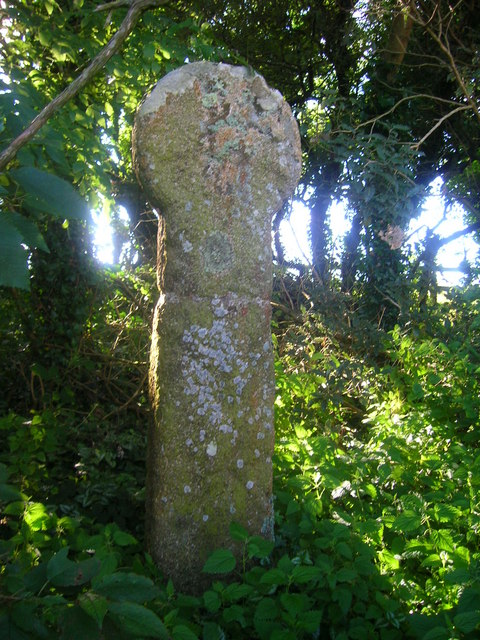
Fig. g2: Penwine Cross

Arthur Langdon (1896) records four Cornish crosses in the parish of St Mabyn: one in the churchyard and others at Colquite, Cross Hill (illustrated g8) and Penwine. The Penwine cross is at Longstone.

In the churchyard of St Enodoc's Church in the parish of St Minver is a Cornish cross which consists of a head and upper part of the shaft. These were found built into the churchyard wall in 1863. See also Fig. g9.

There is a Cornish cross (illustrated g10) in the cemetery on the other side of the road from the churchyard at St Teath. An account of it was given in the Antiquarian Magazine, August 1883. Part of it was once used as a footbridge; it was afterwards used in the churchyard wall but the parts were reunited and repaired; both the head and the shaft are ornamented. There is also a cross base in the churchyard.

Arthur Langdon (1896) recorded the existence of eight stone crosses in the parish of Temple, including two cross slabs, all in the churchyard. Several of these crosses were subsequently incorporated into a stone outbuilding on the south side of the church.

Gallery

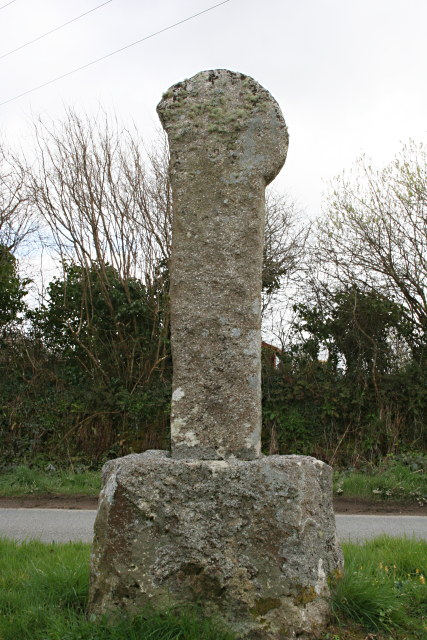
Fig. g3 a Cornish cross on Old Callywith Road, Bodmin

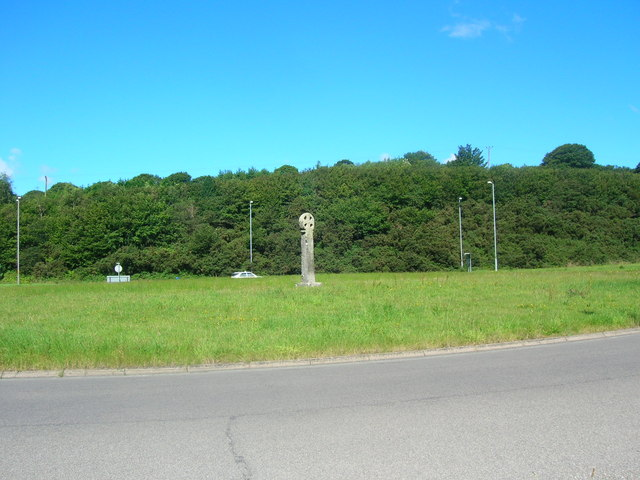
Fig. g4: Carminow Cross

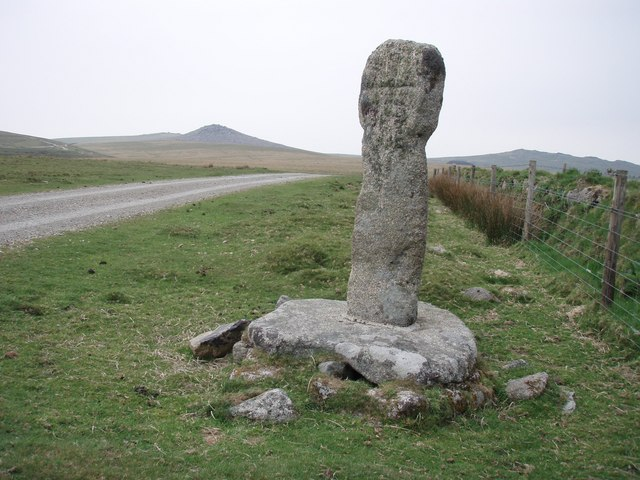
Fig. g5: Middle Moor cross

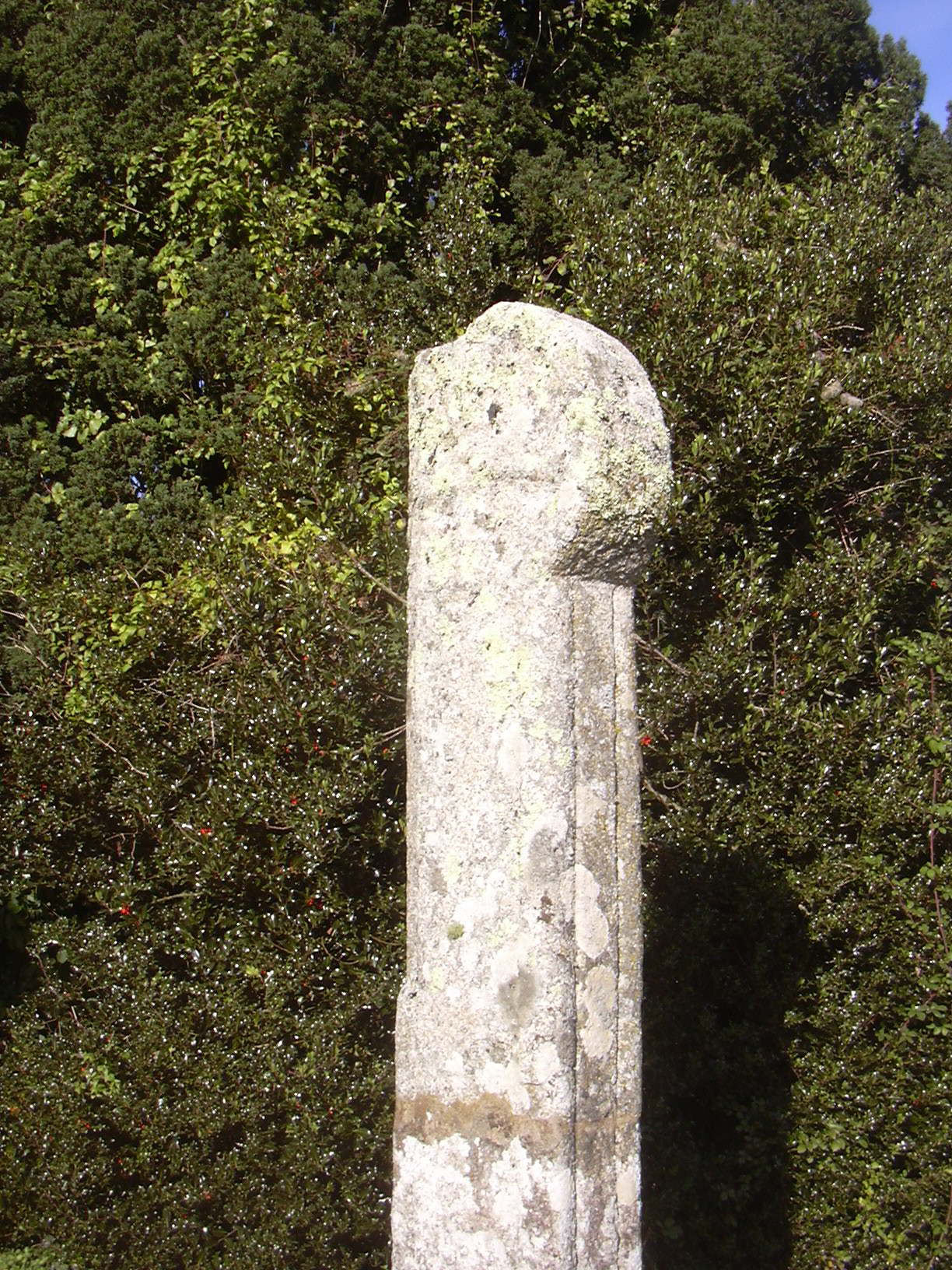
Fig. g6: a cross in St Kew churchyard

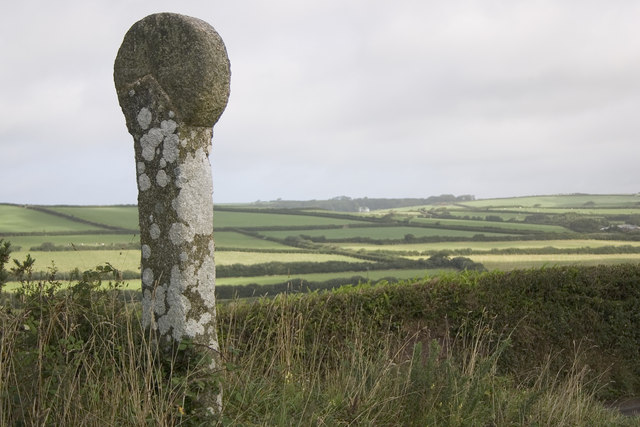
Fig. g7: Job's Cross

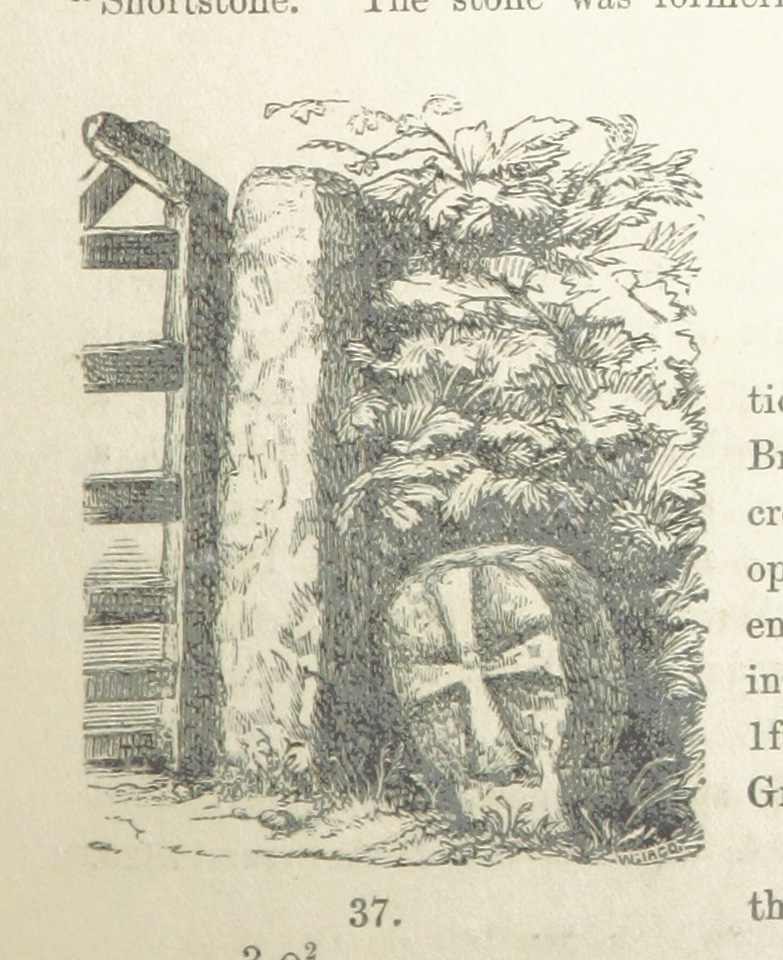
Fig. g8: The cross at Cross Hill

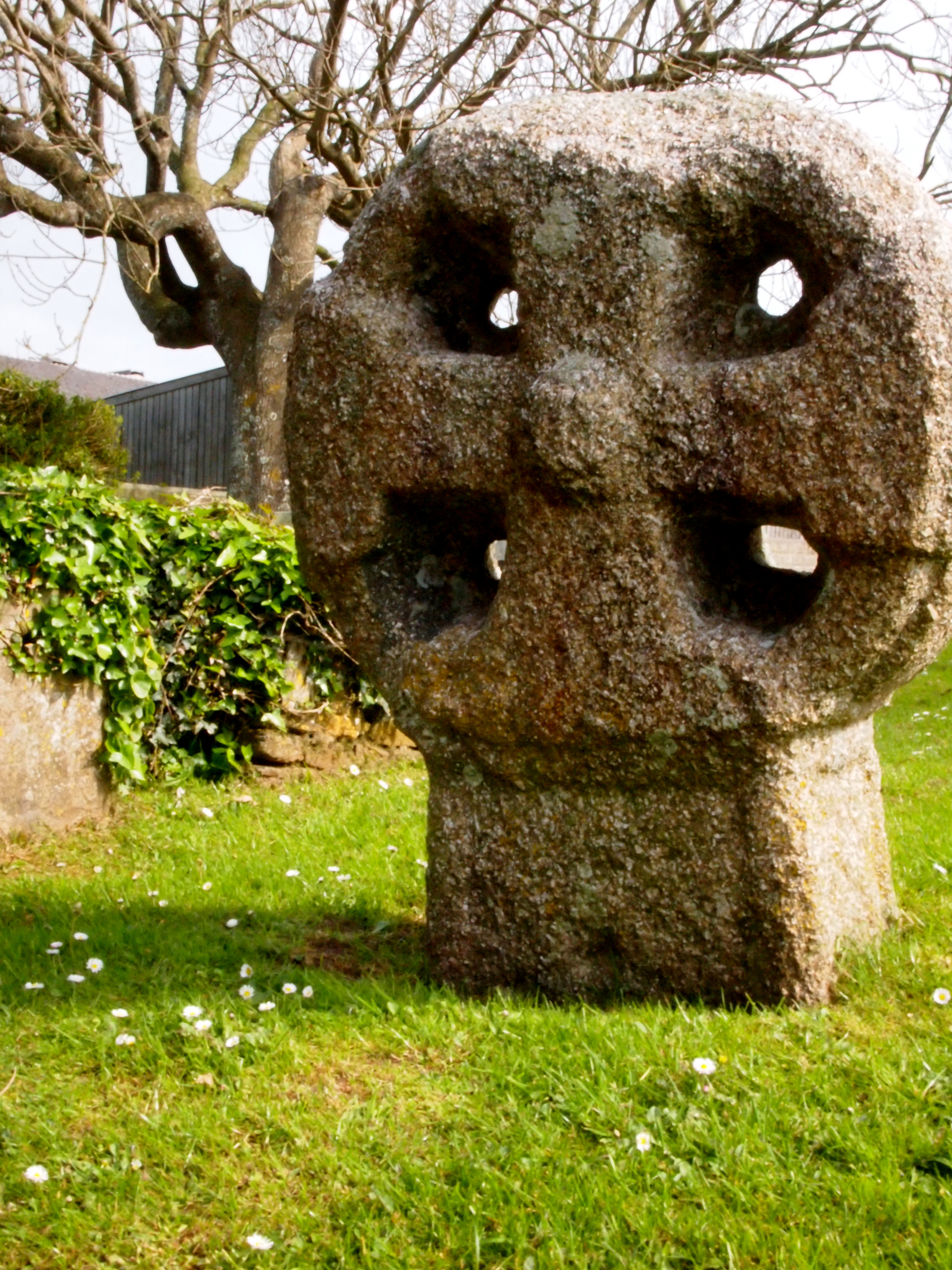
Fig. g9: Porthilly cross (a listed grade 2 medieval four-holed cross in Porthilly Churchyard)

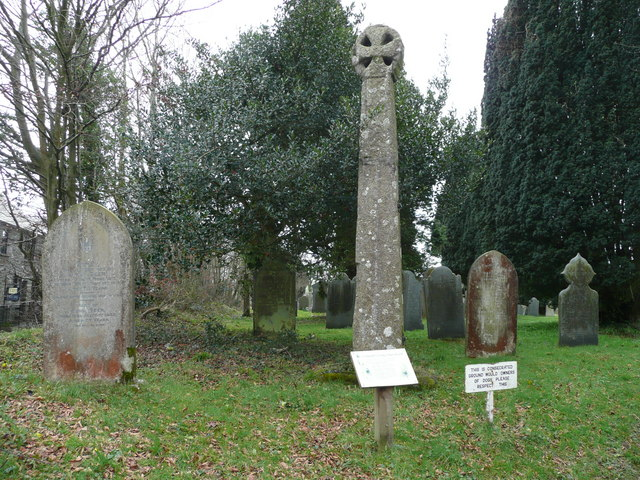
Fig. g10: St Teath cross

== Crosses in West hundred ==
Parishes B - L

At Boconnoc there are Cornish crosses in the churchyard, on Druids' Hill and in Boconnoc Park. The latter cross was removed here from Lanlivery and has some curious incised ornament.

Killboy or Penventon Cross is a stone cross standing on the route of a disused path which runs from Penventon Farm to Braddock church. An account of this cross was published in The Gentleman's Magazine in 1805. The original site of the cross is uncertain.

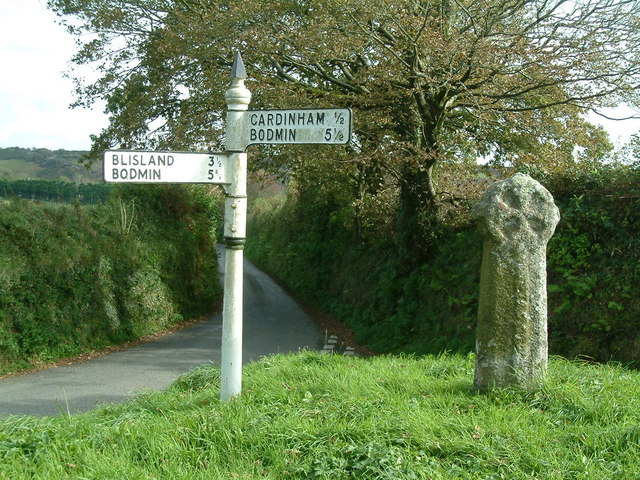
Fig. h1: Treslea Cross

Two freestanding Celtic crosses of stone (illustrated Fig. h4, h5 & h5a), bearing inscriptions in Latin have been found in Cardinham; both had been embedded in the walls of the fifteenth-century church and were moved after their discovery to the churchyard. One has been dated to the fifth to eighth centuries, the other to the tenth or eleventh centuries: Arthur Langdon (1896) also records five other stone crosses in the parish. Andrew Langdon (1996) records two crosses in the churchyard, Higher Deviock Cross, Pinsla Cross at Glynn, Poundstock Cross, Treslea or Wydeyeat Cross and Treslea Down Cross.

A cross now in the churchyard of Lansallos was mentioned by Arthur Langdon (1896) as being in a field west of the churchyard. In 1919 the rector had it erected in the churchyard.

There are two stone crosses in the churchyard of Lanteglos-by-Fowey. One is a tall Gothic lantern cross (illustrated Fig. h6) which was found buried in a trench next to the church in 1838. It has been suggested that it was buried deliberately to prevent its destruction by Commonwealth iconoclasts. It was erected in its present position in 1841. The other cross consists of a cross head found in Pont Pill Creek. When it was moved to the churchyard the corresponding shaft was found there and a few years later c. 1910 it was restored and re-erected. A cross known as Polruan or St Saviour's Cross stands at the top of Fore Street in Polruan. The latter name comes from the former chapel of St Saviour nearby.

Tencreek cross and Culverland cross are stone crosses in the churchyard of Liskeard; the former was found in 1903 at Tencreek Farm and was moved to the churchyard in 1908. The latter was also moved here in 1908 and is thought to have come from a site near Trevecca.

In the churchyard of Lostwithiel is a grave of a member of the Hext family with a medieval lantern cross mounted on a modern shaft. The cross head was found in the 19th century at an unknown location and in 1882 set up in the churchyard. It was later moved to its present position.

Parishes S - W

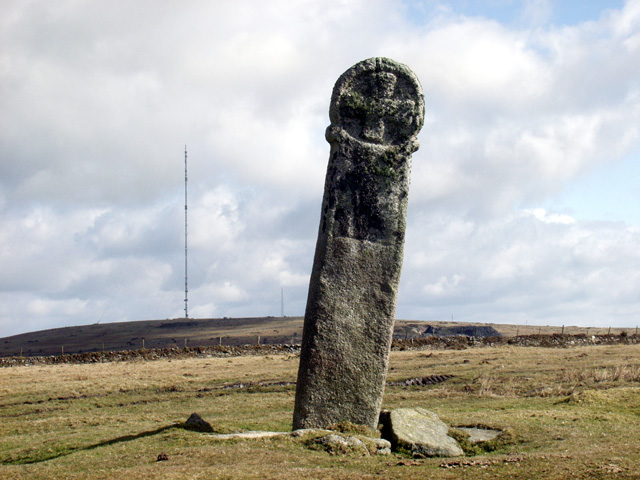
Fig. h2: Long Tom

Arthur Langdon (1896) recorded five Cornish crosses in the parish of St Cleer; one called Long Tom is at St Cleer Common, another is at St Cleer's Well (illustrated Fig. h7) and a cross at Trevorgy is missing. There are also two stones at Redgate of which one is the Doniert Stone and the other is known at the Other Half Stone. Another cross was discovered at East Fursnewth Farm in 1930 and afterwards removed and erected at Pendean House, Liskeard.

A stone cross was found at Tregoad Farm in the parish of St Martin-by-Looe in 1906 built into the wall of a stable. In 1931 it was set up on a new base at Tregoad by the Looe Old Cornwall Society. In 1971 it was removed to the Guildhall Museum in East Looe for preservation. It is a rare example in east Cornwall of a cross with a carved figure of Christ, in this case incised.

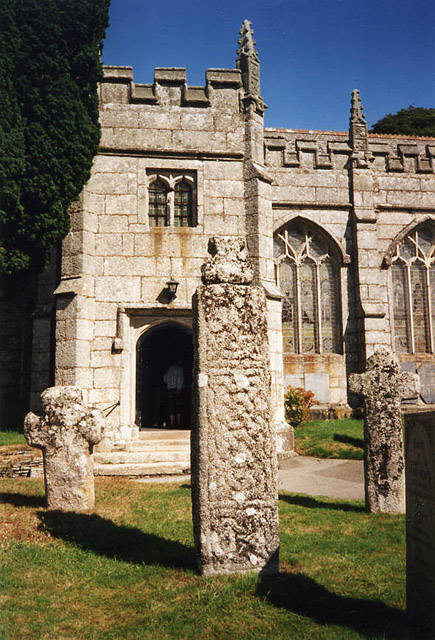
Fig. h3: crosses in St Neot churchyard

Arthur Langdon (1896) records eight Cornish crosses and two cross bases in the parish of St Neot. Four-hole Cross is located by the main Launceston to Bodmin road close to the milestone showing eight miles to Bodmin. The shaft is ornamented on all four sides. The other crosses are three in the vicarage garden, another in the village, another in the churchyard (its shaft is ornamented on all four sides with interlaced carving; illustrated Fig. h8), and others at Hilltown and Newtown. A cross at Tredinnick, found in 1958, is illustrated Fig. h9; Wenmouth Cross is illustrated Fig. h10.

Bosent Cross (illustrated Fig. h11) in the parish of St Pinnock is a fine 14th-century cross; the cross in the rectory garden came from Towednack.

Andrew Langdon (1996) records three stone crosses in the parish of St Winnow. A cross found at Higher Coombe in 1903 was afterwards erected at St Nectan's chapel. A cross from Lanlivery was made into the upper section of "The Monument" on Druids Hill. It was brought from Lanlivery in 1846; this monument commemorates the loss of life in the Battle of Braddock Down in 1643. A third cross called Waterlake Cross stands in a private garden near Respryn. The third cross had already been recorded by Arthur G. Langdon in 1896; at Waterlake, a hamlet near Bodmin Road station, there is a Cornish cross.

A stone cross was found in the 1920s at East Waylands Farm in the parish of Talland as part of farm buildings. On 12 May 1930 it was erected at Portlooe Cross, a road junction northeast of Portlooe Farm.

At Tregaminion Church in the parish of Tywardreath was a private chapel belonging to the Rashleighs of Menabilly. There is a Cornish cross outside the northwest angle of the chapel. Another cross is also in the chapel grounds; this was found in 1889 in use as a footbridge in Lostwithiel (one cross is illustrated Fig. h12)

Andrew Langdon (1994) records five crosses in the parish of Tywardreath. These are two at Tregaminion, two at Menabilly and Trenython Cross. The crosses at Menabilly are Methrose Cross and Barrs Cross. The former was originally in the parish of Luxulyan and the latter on the boundary of the parishes of St Sampson and Lanlivery. Trenython Cross was found in 1898 by John Gott, Bishop of Truro; it was re-erected in the grounds in 1987.

There is a Cornish cross (illustrated Fig. h13) in the churchyard of Warleggan; its original location is unknown but it was brought here from Carburrow. In 1858 it was found on Warleggan Down between Carburrow and Treveddoe; later in the 19th century it was moved to its present position.

Gallery

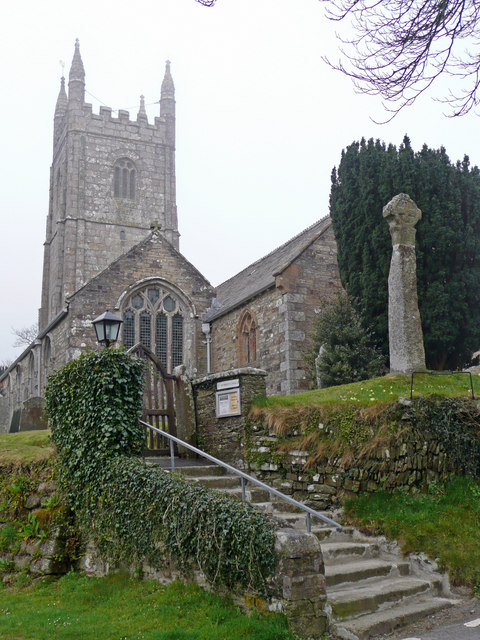
Fig. h4: St Meubred's church, Cardinham (note the cross on the right)

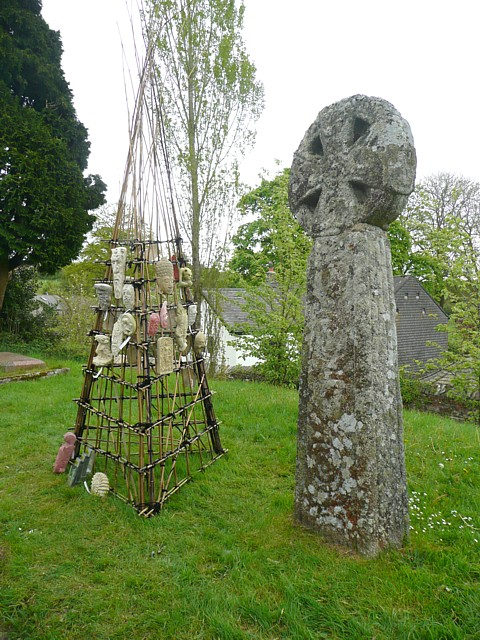
Fig. h5: one of the crosses in the churchyard of Cardinham

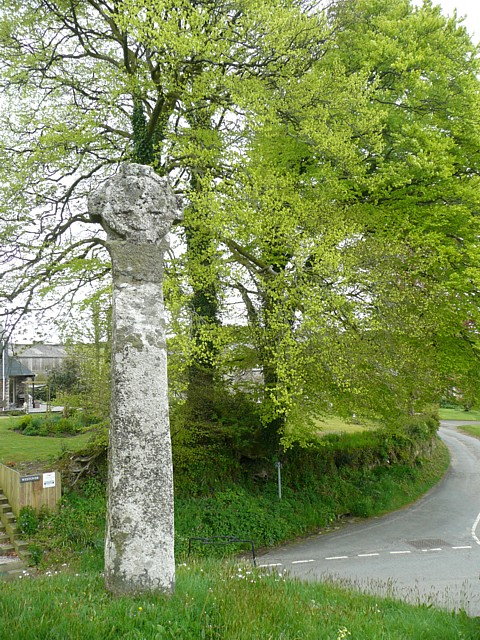
Fig. h5a: one of the crosses in the churchyard of Cardinham

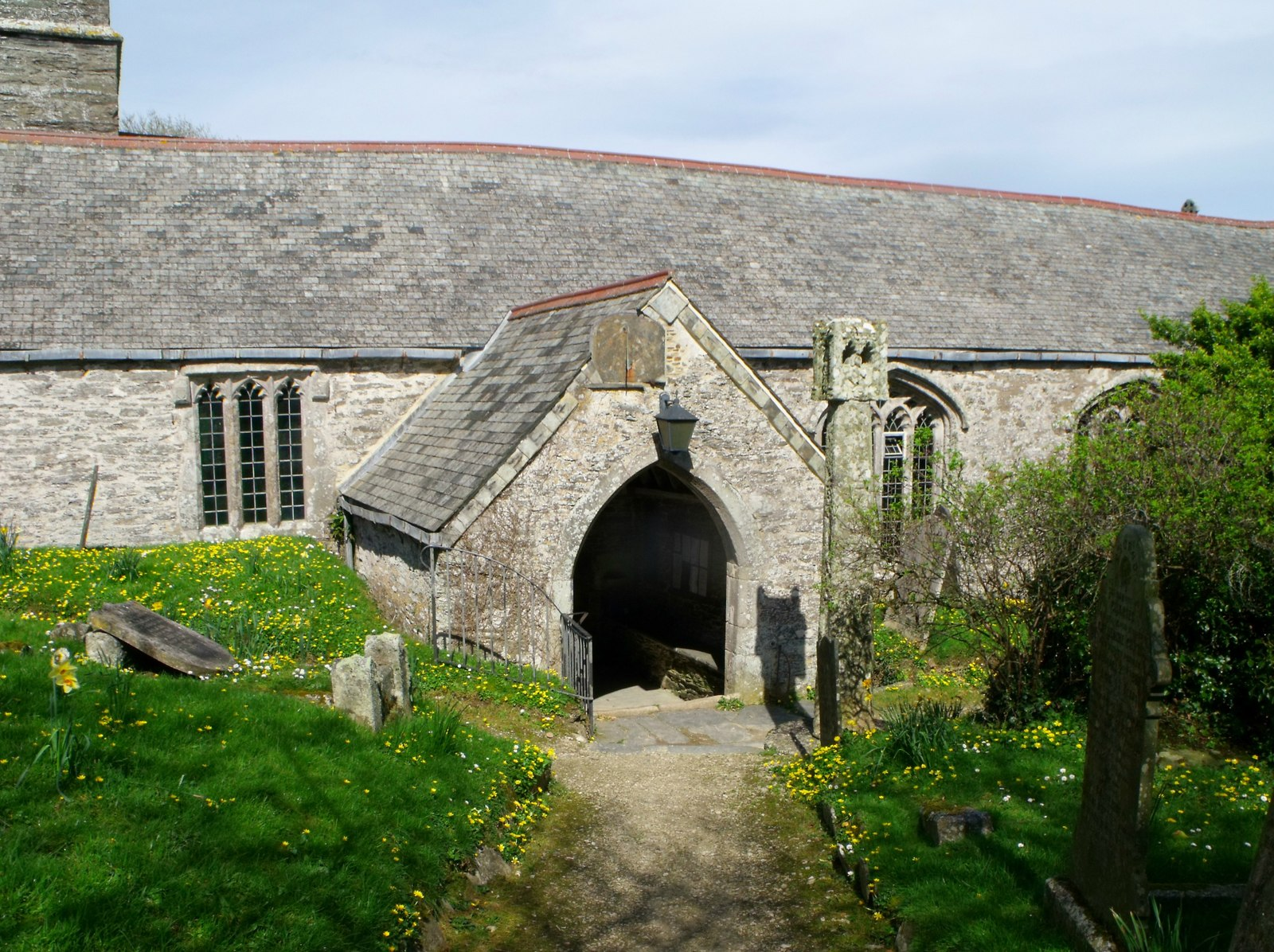
Fig. h6: St Wyllow's Church, Lanteglos-by-Fowey (note the lantern cross near the porch)

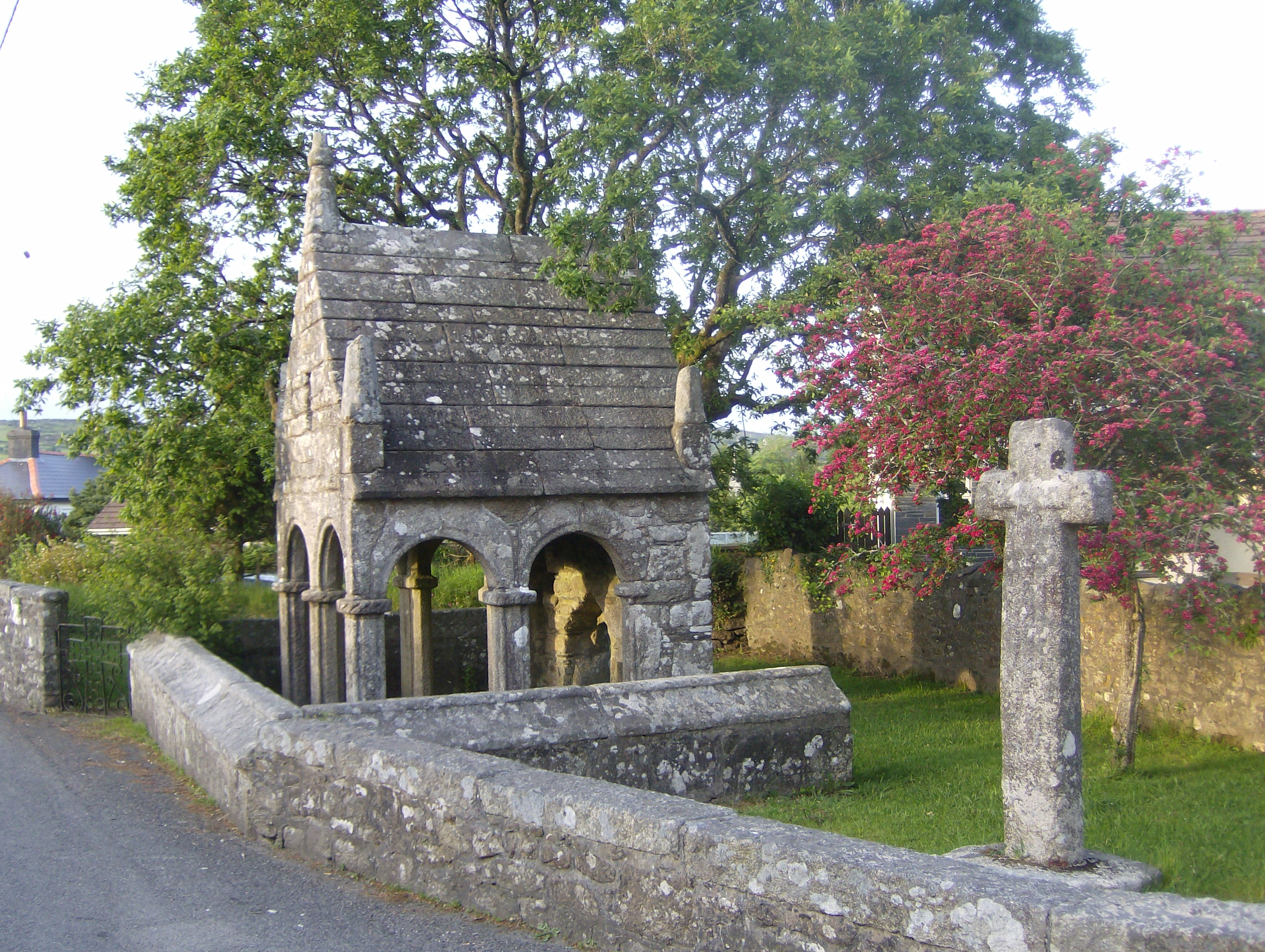
Fig. h7: St Cleer's holy well, with its stone cross

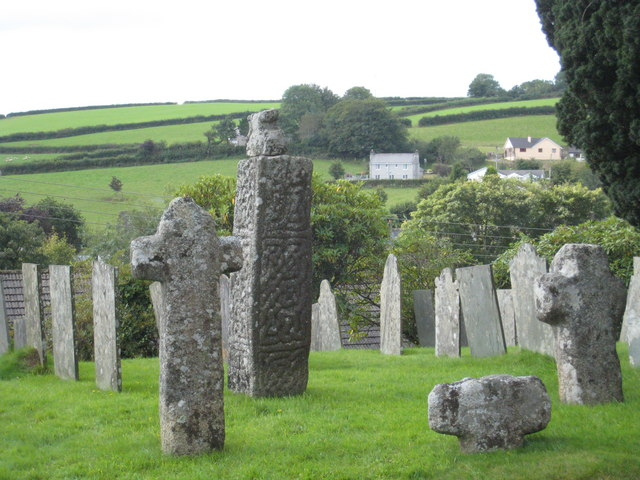
Fig. h8: ancient crosses in St Neot churchyard

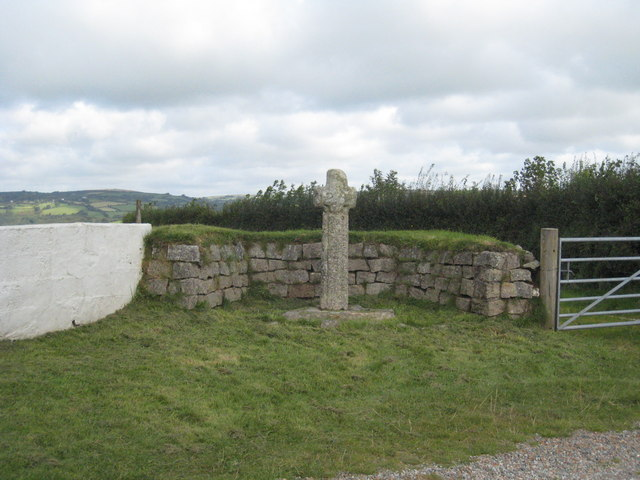
Fig. h9: a cross at Tredinnick (found in 1958)

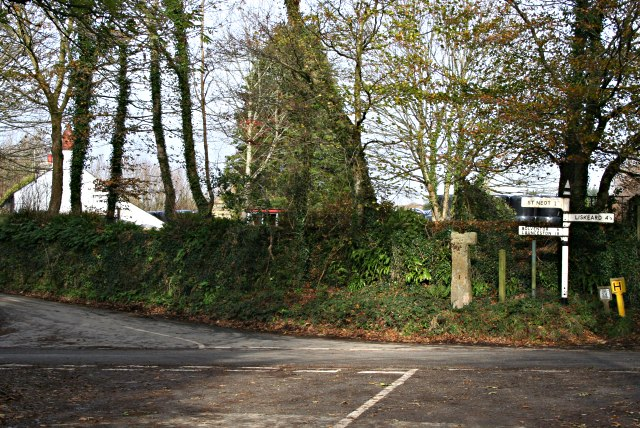
Fig. h10: Wenmouth Cross

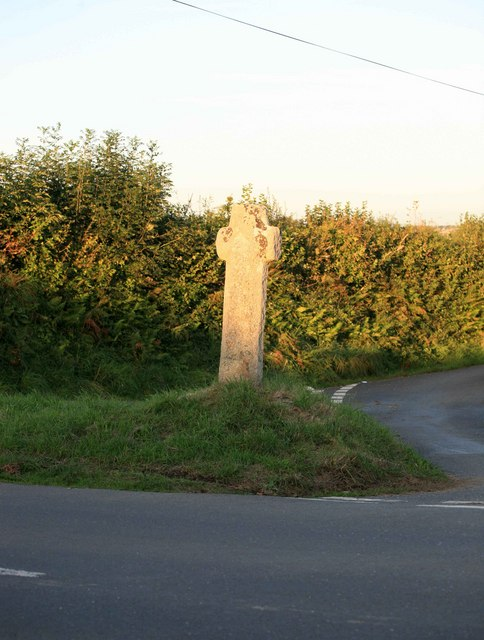
Fig. h11: Bosent Cross

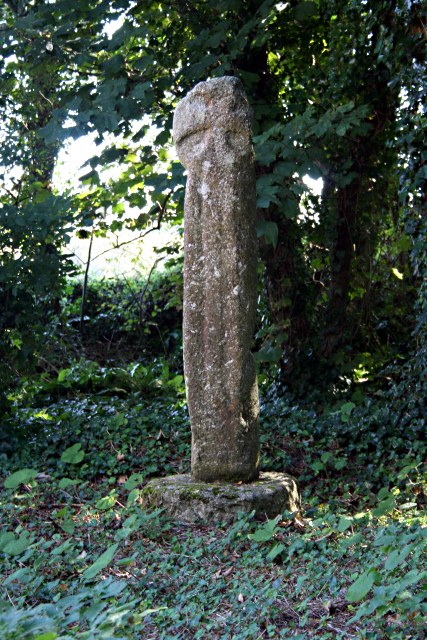
Fig. h12: one of the crosses at Tregaminion Chapel

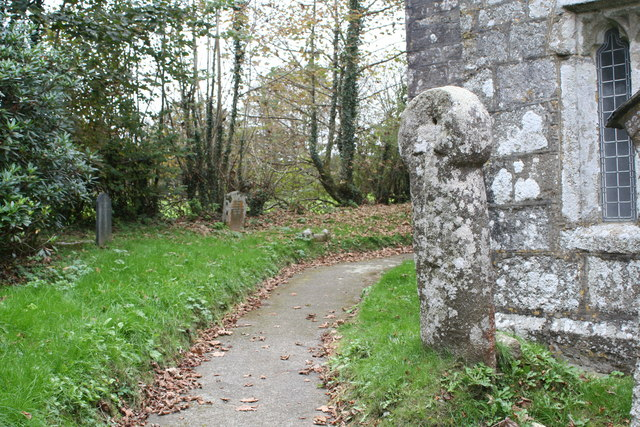
Fig. h13: the cross in Warleggan churchyard

== Some modern crosses ==
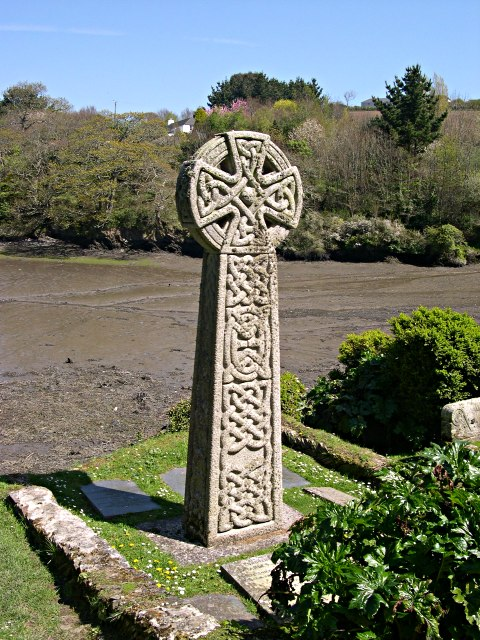
The cross on the grave of Charles Bowen Cooke, St Just in Roseland

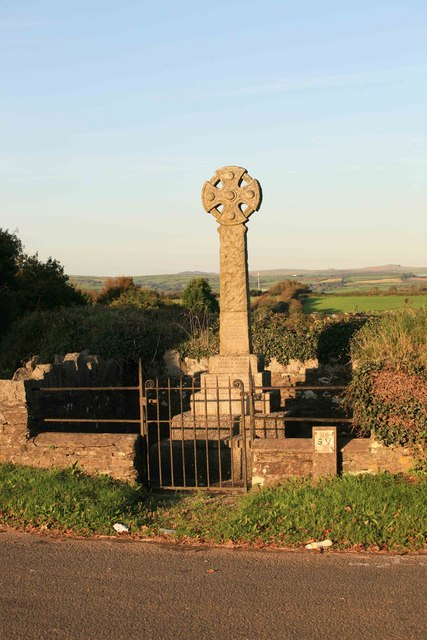
East Taphouse war memorial

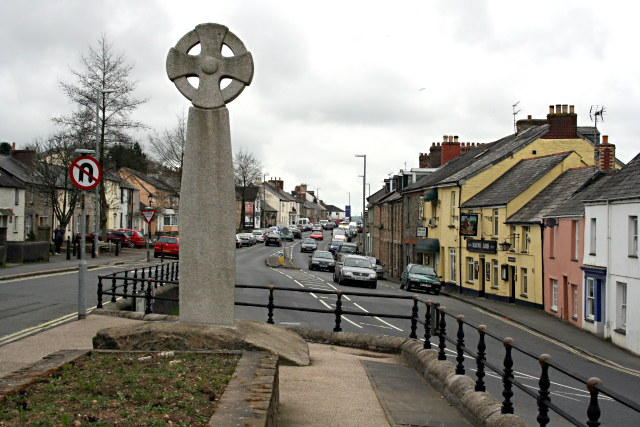
The cross at the end of Higher Bore Street, Bodmin

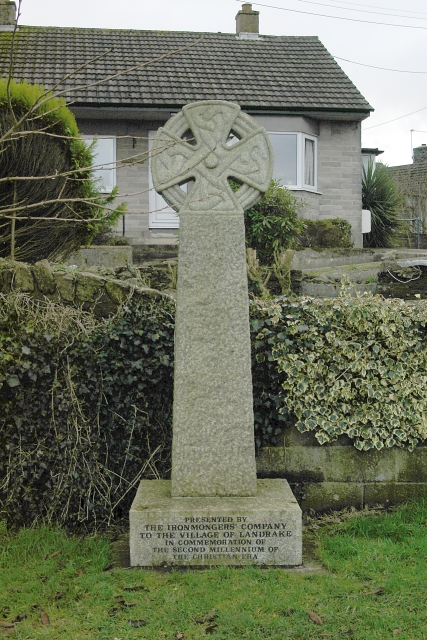
Millennium Cross, Landrake

== Further reading & External links ==
- interactive map of GB Wayside Crosses centred on Cornwall Data from the Milestone Society
- Haslam, William (1845). On the Crosses of Cornwall ... Report, Volumes 20-28 by the Royal Institution of Cornwall, Appendix IV.
- Baring-Gould, S. (1899). A Book of the West ... Vol. 2: Cornwall. London: Methuen, pp. 38–43 "Cornish crosses"
- Blight, John Thomas (1872) Ancient Crosses and Other Antiquities in the East of Cornwall 3rd ed.
- Blight, John Thomas (1856) Ancient Crosses and Other Antiquities in the West of Cornwall (1856), 2nd edition 1858. (A reprint is offered online at Men-an-Tol Studios) (3rd ed. Penzance: W. Cornish, 1872) (facsimile ed. reproducing 1856 ed.: Blight's Cornish Crosses; Penzance: Oakmagic Publications, 1997)
- Preston-Jones, Ann; Langdon, Andrew & Okasha, Elisabeth (2021) Ancient and High Crosses of Cornwall: Cornwall's earliest, tallest and finest medieval stone crosses. Exeter: University of Exeter ISBN 1905816618
