= List of United Kingdom locations: Chi-Ck =

The United Kingdom

This is part of the list of United Kingdom locations: a gazetteer of place names in the United Kingdom showing each place's locality and geographical coordinates.

== Ch (continued) ==
=== Chi ===
Location	Locality	Coordinates (links to map & photo sources)	OS grid reference
Chichacott	Devon	50.74°N 03.98°W	SX6096
Chicheley	Milton Keynes	52.09°N 00.68°W	SP9045
Chichester	West Sussex	50.82°N 00.78°W	SU8604
Chicken Head	Western Isles	58.18°N 06.24°W	NB507296
Chickenley	Kirklees	53.68°N 01.60°W	SE2621
Chickerell	Dorset	50.61°N 02.51°W	SY6480
Chicklade	Wiltshire	51.10°N 02.12°W	ST9134
Chickney	Essex	51.92°N 00.28°E	TL5728
Chicksands	Bedfordshire	52.03°N 00.36°W	TL1239
Chicksgrove	Wiltshire	51.06°N 02.04°W	ST9729
Chickward	Herefordshire	52.17°N 03.05°W	SO2853
Chidden	Hampshire	50.94°N 01.07°W	SU6517
Chiddingfold	Surrey	51.10°N 00.64°W	SU9535
Chiddingly	East Sussex	50.90°N 00.18°E	TQ5414
Chiddingstone	Kent	51.18°N 00.13°E	TQ4945
Chiddingstone Causeway	Kent	51.19°N 00.17°E	TQ5246
Chiddingstone Hoath	Kent	51.15°N 00.12°E	TQ4942
Chideock	Dorset	50.72°N 02.82°W	SY4292
Chidgley	Somerset	51.11°N 03.37°W	ST0436
Chidham	West Sussex	50.82°N 00.87°W	SU7903
Chidswell	Kirklees	53.70°N 01.60°W	SE2623
Chieveley	Berkshire	51.45°N 01.32°W	SU4773
Chignall Smealy	Essex	51.77°N 00.40°E	TL6611
Chignall St James	Essex	51.75°N 00.41°E	TL6709
Chigwell	Essex	51.61°N 00.06°E	TQ4393
Chigwell Row	Essex	51.61°N 00.10°E	TQ4693
Chilbolton	Hampshire	51.14°N 01.44°W	SU3939
Chilbolton Down	Hampshire	51.12°N 01.41°W	SU4136
Chilbridge	Dorset	50.80°N 02.01°W	ST9901
Chilcomb	Hampshire	51.04°N 01.28°W	SU5028
Chilcombe	Dorset	50.71°N 02.68°W	SY5291
Chilcombe	Somerset	51.13°N 03.27°W	ST1138
Chilcompton	Somerset	51.25°N 02.51°W	ST6451
Chilcote	Leicestershire	52.69°N 01.58°W	SK2811
Childerditch	Essex	51.57°N 00.30°E	TQ6089
Childerley Gate	Cambridgeshire	52.21°N 00.02°W	TL3559
Childer Thornton	Cheshire	53.28°N 02.96°W	SJ3677
Child Okeford	Dorset	50.90°N 02.24°W	ST8312
Childrey	Oxfordshire	51.58°N 01.48°W	SU3687
Childsbridge	Kent	51.29°N 00.22°E	TQ5557
Child's Ercall	Shropshire	52.82°N 02.50°W	SJ6625
Childs Hill	Barnet	51.55°N 00.21°W	TQ2486
Childswickham	Worcestershire	52.04°N 01.89°W	SP0738
Childwall	Liverpool	53.39°N 02.88°W	SJ4189
Childwick Bury	Hertfordshire	51.77°N 00.36°W	TL1310
Childwick Green	Hertfordshire	51.77°N 00.34°W	TL1410
Chilfrome	Dorset	50.78°N 02.59°W	SY5898
Chilgrove	West Sussex	50.91°N 00.83°W	SU8214
Chilham	Kent	51.23°N 00.95°E	TR0653
Chillaton	Devon	50.60°N 04.22°W	SX4381
Chillenden	Kent	51.23°N 01.23°E	TR2653
Chillerton	Isle of Wight	50.65°N 01.32°W	SZ4884
Chillesford	Suffolk	52.11°N 01.47°E	TM3852
Chillingham	Northumberland	55.52°N 01.90°W	NU0626
Chillington	Devon	50.26°N 03.69°W	SX7942
Chillington	Somerset	50.89°N 02.88°W	ST3811
Chillmill	Kent	51.13°N 00.38°E	TQ6740
Chilmark	Wiltshire	51.08°N 02.05°W	ST9632
Chilmington Green	Kent	51.12°N 00.82°E	TQ9840
Chilsham	East Sussex	50.89°N 00.31°E	TQ6313
Chilson	Oxfordshire	51.86°N 01.55°W	SP3119
Chilson	Somerset	50.82°N 02.96°W	ST3203
Chilson Common	Somerset	50.83°N 02.95°W	ST3304
Chilsworthy	Cornwall	50.52°N 04.24°W	SX4172
Chilsworthy	Devon	50.82°N 04.38°W	SS3206
Chiltern Green	Bedfordshire	51.85°N 00.36°W	TL1319
Chilthorne Domer	Somerset	50.96°N 02.68°W	ST5219
Chiltington	East Sussex	50.91°N 00.03°W	TQ3815
Chilton	Buckinghamshire	51.79°N 01.01°W	SP6811
Chilton	Durham	54.65°N 01.56°W	NZ2829
Chilton	Kent	51.32°N 01.38°E	TR3664
Chilton	Oxfordshire	51.56°N 01.30°W	SU4885
Chilton	Suffolk	52.04°N 00.75°E	TL8942
Chilton Candover	Hampshire	51.15°N 01.15°W	SU5940
Chilton Cantelo	Somerset	50.99°N 02.61°W	ST5722
Chilton Foliat	Wiltshire	51.42°N 01.55°W	SU3170
Chilton Lane	Durham	54.66°N 01.53°W	NZ3030
Chilton Moor	Durham	54.83°N 01.50°W	NZ3249
Chilton Polden	Somerset	51.14°N 02.90°W	ST3739
Chilton Street	Suffolk	52.08°N 00.55°E	TL7546
Chilton Trinity	Somerset	51.14°N 03.01°W	ST2939
Chilvers Coton	Warwickshire	52.50°N 01.48°W	SP3590
Chilwell	Nottinghamshire	52.91°N 01.24°W	SK5135
Chilworth	Hampshire	50.96°N 01.41°W	SU4118
Chilworth	Surrey	51.21°N 00.54°W	TQ0247
Chilworth Old Village	Hampshire	50.96°N 01.43°W	SU4018
Chimney	Oxfordshire	51.69°N 01.49°W	SP3500
Chimney-end	Oxfordshire	51.83°N 01.55°W	SP3115
Chimney Street	Suffolk	52.10°N 00.51°E	TL7248
Chinbrook	Lewisham	51.431°N 00.031°E	TQ413722
Chineham	Hampshire	51.29°N 01.06°W	SU6555
Chingford	Waltham Forest	51.62°N 00.01°E	TQ3994
Chingford Green	Waltham Forest	51.62°N 00.01°W	TQ3894
Chingford Hatch	Waltham Forest	51.61°N 00.01°W	TQ3892
Chinley	Derbyshire	53.33°N 01.94°W	SK0482
Chinley Head	Derbyshire	53.35°N 01.94°W	SK0484
Chinnor	Oxfordshire	51.69°N 00.91°W	SP7500
Chipley	Somerset	50.99°N 03.26°W	ST1123
Chipmans Platt	Gloucestershire	51.75°N 02.32°W	SO7806
Chipnall	Shropshire	52.87°N 02.41°W	SJ7231
Chippenhall Green	Suffolk	52.32°N 01.34°E	TM2875
Chippenham	Cambridgeshire	52.29°N 00.43°E	TL6669
Chippenham	Wiltshire	51.45°N 02.13°W	ST9173
Chipperfield	Hertfordshire	51.69°N 00.49°W	TL0401
Chipping	Hertfordshire	51.97°N 00.03°W	TL3532
Chipping	Lancashire	53.88°N 02.57°W	SD6243
Chipping Barnet	Barnet	51.64°N 00.20°W	TQ2496
Chipping Campden	Gloucestershire	52.04°N 01.78°W	SP1539
Chipping Hill	Essex	51.80°N 00.62°E	TL8115
Chipping Norton	Oxfordshire	51.93°N 01.55°W	SP3126
Chipping Ongar	Essex	51.70°N 00.24°E	TL5503
Chipping Sodbury	South Gloucestershire	51.53°N 02.40°W	ST7282
Chipping Warden	Northamptonshire	52.12°N 01.28°W	SP4948
Chipstable	Somerset	51.03°N 03.37°W	ST0427
Chipstead	Kent	51.28°N 00.13°E	TQ4956
Chipstead	Surrey	51.29°N 00.17°W	TQ2757
Chirbury	Shropshire	52.57°N 03.09°W	SO2698
Chirk	Wrexham	52.92°N 03.05°W	SJ2937
Chirk Bank	Shropshire	52.91°N 03.05°W	SJ2936
Chirk Green	Wrexham	52.93°N 03.05°W	SJ2938
Chirnside	Scottish Borders	55.79°N 02.20°W	NT8756
Chirnsidebridge	Scottish Borders	55.79°N 02.24°W	NT8556
Chirton	North Tyneside	55.00°N 01.46°W	NZ3468
Chirton	Wiltshire	51.31°N 01.90°W	SU0757
Chisbridge Cross	Buckinghamshire	51.59°N 00.83°W	SU8189
Chisbury	Wiltshire	51.39°N 01.61°W	SU2766
Chiselborough	Somerset	50.92°N 02.76°W	ST4614
Chiseldon	Swindon	51.50°N 01.74°W	SU1879
Chiserley	Calderdale	53.74°N 02.00°W	SE0028
Chiselhampton	Oxfordshire	51.67°N 01.14°W	SU5998
Chislehurst	Bromley	51.41°N 00.06°E	TQ4470
Chislehurst West	Bromley	51.42°N 00.05°E	TQ4371
Chislet	Kent	51.33°N 01.18°E	TR2264
Chislet Forstal	Kent	51.33°N 01.17°E	TR2164
Chiswell Green	Hertfordshire	51.72°N 00.36°W	TL1304
Chiswick	Hounslow	51.48°N 00.27°W	TQ2078
Chiswick End	Cambridgeshire	52.08°N -00.00°E	TL3745
Chisworth	Derbyshire	53.42°N 02.01°W	SJ9992
Chitcombe	East Sussex	50.95°N 00.57°E	TQ8120
Chithurst	West Sussex	51.00°N 00.80°W	SU8423
Chittering	Cambridgeshire	52.30°N 00.18°E	TL4970
Chitterley	Devon	50.82°N 03.50°W	SS9404
Chitterne	Wiltshire	51.19°N 02.01°W	ST9944
Chittlehamholt	Devon	50.96°N 03.93°W	SS6420
Chittlehampton	Devon	51.00°N 03.95°W	SS6325
Chittoe	Wiltshire	51.39°N 02.07°W	ST9566
Chitts Hill	Essex	51.88°N 00.83°E	TL9525
Chitty	Kent	51.33°N 01.18°E	TR2264
Chivelstone	Devon	50.22°N 03.71°W	SX7838
Chivenor	Devon	51.08°N 04.14°W	SS5034
Chivery	Buckinghamshire	51.75°N 00.69°W	SP9007

=== Cho ===
Location	Locality	Coordinates (links to map & photo sources)	OS grid reference
Chobham	Surrey	51.34°N 00.60°W	SU9761
Cholderton	Wiltshire	51.17°N 01.68°W	SU2242
Cholesbury	Buckinghamshire	51.75°N 00.65°W	SP9307
Chollerford	Northumberland	55.02°N 02.14°W	NY9170
Chollerton	Northumberland	55.04°N 02.11°W	NY9372
Cholmondeston	Cheshire	53.12°N 02.56°W	SJ6259
Cholsey	Oxfordshire	51.57°N 01.16°W	SU5886
Cholstrey	Herefordshire	52.22°N 02.79°W	SO4659
Cholwell	Bath and North East Somerset	51.31°N 02.56°W	ST6158
Chop Gate	North Yorkshire	54.38°N 01.15°W	SE5599
Choppington	Northumberland	55.14°N 01.60°W	NZ2583
Chopwell	Gateshead	54.91°N 01.82°W	NZ1158
Chorley (Alderley)	Cheshire	53.05°N 02.64°W	SJ8379
Chorley (Cholmondeley)	Cheshire	53.31°N 02.26°W	SJ5751
Chorley	Lancashire	53.64°N 02.63°W	SD5817
Chorley	Shropshire	52.44°N 02.45°W	SO6983
Chorley	Staffordshire	52.68°N 01.89°W	SK0710
Chorley Common	West Sussex	51.02°N 00.81°W	SU8326
Chorleywood	Hertfordshire	51.65°N 00.52°W	TQ0296
Chorleywood Bottom	Hertfordshire	51.64°N 00.52°W	TQ0295
Chorleywood West	Hertfordshire	51.65°N 00.54°W	TQ0196
Chorlton	Cheshire	53.04°N 02.41°W	SJ7250
Chorlton-cum-Hardy	Manchester	53.43°N 02.28°W	SJ8193
Chorlton Lane	Cheshire	53.01°N 02.82°W	SJ4547
Choulton	Shropshire	52.48°N 02.92°W	SO3788
Chowdene	Gateshead	54.92°N 01.61°W	NZ2559
Chownes Mead	West Sussex	50.99°N 00.13°W	TQ3123

=== Chr ===
Location	Locality	Coordinates (links to map & photo sources)	OS grid reference
Chrishall	Essex	52.03°N 00.09°E	TL4439
Christchurch	Bournemouth	50.72°N 01.78°W	SZ1592
Christchurch	Cambridgeshire	52.54°N 00.19°E	TL4996
Christchurch	Gloucestershire	51.80°N 02.62°W	SO5712
Christchurch	City of Newport	51.59°N 02.95°W	ST3489
Christian Malford	Wiltshire	51.50°N 02.05°W	ST9678
Christleton	Cheshire	53.17°N 02.83°W	SJ4465
Christmas Common	Oxfordshire	51.63°N 00.97°W	SU7193
Christon	North Somerset	51.30°N 02.90°W	ST3757
Christon Bank	Northumberland	55.50°N 01.66°W	NU2123
Christow	Devon	50.64°N 03.65°W	SX8384
Chryston	North Lanarkshire	55.90°N 04.11°W	NS6870

=== Chu ===
==== Chub-Chun ====
Location	Locality	Coordinates (links to map & photo sources)	OS grid reference
Chub Tor	Devon	50.47°N 04.10°W	SX5166
Chuck Hatch	East Sussex	51.07°N 00.09°E	TQ4733
Chudleigh	Devon	50.59°N 03.61°W	SX8679
Chudleigh Knighton	Devon	50.58°N 03.63°W	SX8477
Chulmleigh	Devon	50.91°N 03.87°W	SS6814
Chunal	Derbyshire	53.41°N 01.95°W	SK0391

==== Church ====
Location	Locality	Coordinates (links to map & photo sources)	OS grid reference
Church	Lancashire	53.75°N 02.39°W	SD7429
Churcham	Gloucestershire	51.86°N 02.34°W	SO7618
Church Aston	Shropshire	52.75°N 02.38°W	SJ7417
Churchbank	Shropshire	52.40°N 03.04°W	SO2979
Church Brampton	Northamptonshire	52.27°N 00.96°W	SP7165
Churchbridge	Cornwall	50.39°N 04.52°W	SX2158
Churchbridge	Staffordshire	52.67°N 02.03°W	SJ9808
Church Brough	Cumbria	54.51°N 02.32°W	NY7913
Church Broughton	Derbyshire	52.89°N 01.70°W	SK2033
Church Charwelton	Northamptonshire	52.19°N 01.21°W	SP5455
Church Clough	Lancashire	53.84°N 02.18°W	SD8839
Church Common	Hampshire	51.01°N 00.96°W	SU7325
Church Coombe	Cornwall	50.21°N 05.23°W	SW6940
Church Cove	Cornwall	49.96°N 05.19°W	SW7112
Church Crookham	Hampshire	51.26°N 00.84°W	SU8152
Churchdown	Gloucestershire	51.87°N 02.19°W	SO8720
Church Eaton	Staffordshire	52.75°N 02.23°W	SJ8417
Church End	Barnet	51.59°N 00.21°W	TQ2490
Church End (Arlesey)	Bedfordshire	52.01°N 00.26°W	TL1937
Church End (Husborne Crawley)	Bedfordshire	52.01°N 00.61°W	SP9536
Church End (Kensworth)	Bedfordshire	51.85°N 00.50°W	TL0318
Church End (Milton Bryan)	Bedfordshire	51.97°N 00.57°W	SP9832
Church End (Ravensden)	Bedfordshire	52.17°N 00.43°W	TL0754
Church End (Renhold)	Bedfordshire	52.16°N 00.41°W	TL1058
Church End (Tempsford)	Bedfordshire	52.16°N 00.30°W	TL1653
Church End (Thurleigh)	Bedfordshire	52.21°N 00.46°W	TL0558
Church End (Totternhoe)	Bedfordshire	51.87°N 00.56°W	SP9921
Church End	Brent	51.54°N 00.25°W	TQ2184
Church End (Aylesbury Vale)	Buckinghamshire	51.77°N 00.93°W	SP7407
Church End (Pitstone)	Buckinghamshire	51.82°N 00.63°W	SP9415
Church End (Catworth)	Cambridgeshire	52.34°N 00.40°W	TL0973
Church End (Huntingdonshire)	Cambridgeshire	52.42°N 00.23°W	TL2082
Church End (Over)	Cambridgeshire	52.31°N 00.01°E	TL3770
Church End (Swavesey)	Cambridgeshire	52.30°N 00.01°W	TL3669
Church End (Wisbech)	Cambridgeshire	52.66°N 00.05°E	TF3808
Church End	Coventry	52.41°N 01.47°W	SP3579
Church End	East Riding of Yorkshire	53.96°N 00.33°W	TA0953
Church End (Ashdon)	Essex	52.05°N 00.30°E	TL5841
Church End (Broxted)	Essex	51.92°N 00.29°E	TL5727
Church End (Chelmsford)	Essex	51.82°N 00.52°E	TL7316
Church End (Great Dunmow)	Essex	51.88°N 00.37°E	TL6322
Church End (Shalford)	Essex	51.93°N 00.51°E	TL7227
Church End (Frampton on Severn)	Gloucestershire	51.76°N 02.37°W	SO7406
Church End (Tewkesbury)	Gloucestershire	52.02°N 02.16°W	SO8936
Church End	Hampshire	51.29°N 01.04°W	SU6756
Church End (East Hertfordshire)	Hertfordshire	51.89°N 00.10°E	TL4422
Church End (North Hertfordshire)	Hertfordshire	51.95°N 00.16°W	TL2630
Church End (Redbourn)	Hertfordshire	51.79°N 00.41°W	TL1011
Church End (Three Rivers)	Hertfordshire	51.67°N 00.51°W	TQ0398
Church End (East Lindsey)	Lincolnshire	53.44°N 00.14°E	TF4295
Church End (South Holland)	Lincolnshire	52.88°N 00.18°W	TF2234
Church End	Norfolk	52.71°N 00.23°E	TF5115
Church End (Great Rollright)	Oxfordshire	51.98°N 01.53°W	SP3231
Church End (West Oxfordshire)	Oxfordshire	51.78°N 01.43°W	SP3908
Church End	Suffolk	51.97°N 01.24°E	TM2336
Church End	Surrey	51.29°N 00.48°W	TQ0656
Church End (Ansley)	Warwickshire	52.53°N 01.57°W	SP2992
Church End (Shustoke)	Warwickshire	52.51°N 01.64°W	SP2490
Church End	Wiltshire	51.50°N 01.97°W	SU0278
Church End	Worcestershire	52.06°N 02.24°W	SO8341
Churchend	Berkshire	51.45°N 01.03°W	SU6773
Churchend (Foulness Island)	Essex	51.59°N 00.88°E	TR0092
Churchend (Eastington)	Gloucestershire	51.75°N 02.32°W	SO7805
Churchend	South Gloucestershire	51.62°N 02.41°W	ST7191
Church Enstone	Oxfordshire	51.92°N 01.46°W	SP3725
Churches Green	East Sussex	50.92°N 00.33°E	TQ6417
Church Fenton	North Yorkshire	53.81°N 01.22°W	SE5136
Churchfield	Herefordshire	52.11°N 02.39°W	SO7346
Churchfield	Sandwell	52.52°N 01.98°W	SP0192
Churchfields	Wiltshire	51.06°N 01.81°W	SU1329
Churchgate	Hertfordshire	51.70°N 00.06°W	TL3402
Churchgate Street	Essex	51.77°N 00.14°E	TL4811
Church Green	Devon	50.75°N 03.17°W	SY1796
Church Green	Norfolk	52.47°N 01.03°E	TM0691
Church Gresley	Derbyshire	52.75°N 01.57°W	SK2918
Church Hanborough	Oxfordshire	51.80°N 01.39°W	SP4212
Church Hill	Herefordshire	52.31°N 01.91°W	SP0668
Church Hill	Pembrokeshire	51.78°N 04.94°W	SM9714
Church Hill	Sandwell	52.55°N 02.03°W	SO9895
Church Hill	Staffordshire	52.70°N 02.00°W	SK0012
Church Hougham	Kent	51.11°N 01.24°E	TR2740
Church Houses	North Yorkshire	54.36°N 00.98°W	SE6697
Churchill (near All Saints)	Devon	50.80°N 03.00°W	ST2901
Churchill (near East Down)	Devon	51.14°N 04.01°W	SS5940
Churchill	North Somerset	51.33°N 02.79°W	ST4560
Churchill	Oxfordshire	51.91°N 01.59°W	SP2824
Churchill (Wychavon)	Worcestershire	52.17°N 02.11°W	SO9253
Churchill (Wyre Forest)	Worcestershire	52.40°N 02.17°W	SO8879
Churchill Green	North Somerset	51.33°N 02.81°W	ST4360
Churchinford	Somerset	50.90°N 03.12°W	ST2112
Church Knowle	Dorset	50.62°N 02.10°W	SY9381
Church Laneham	Nottinghamshire	53.27°N 00.78°W	SK8176
Church Langton	Leicestershire	52.53°N 00.93°W	SP7293
Church Lawford	Warwickshire	52.38°N 01.35°W	SP4476
Church Lawton	Cheshire	53.09°N 02.28°W	SJ8155
Church Leigh	Staffordshire	52.91°N 01.97°W	SK0235
Church Lench	Worcestershire	52.15°N 01.97°W	SP0251
Church Mayfield	Derbyshire	52.99°N 01.77°W	SK1544
Church Minshull	Cheshire	53.13°N 02.50°W	SJ6660
Churchmoor Rough	Shropshire	52.48°N 02.88°W	SO4088
Church Norton	West Sussex	50.74°N 00.78°W	SZ8695
Church Oakley	Hampshire	51.24°N 01.19°W	SU5650
Churchover	Warwickshire	52.41°N 01.25°W	SP5180
Church Preen	Shropshire	52.57°N 02.68°W	SO5498
Church Pulverbatch	Shropshire	52.61°N 02.84°W	SJ4302
Churchstanton	Somerset	50.91°N 03.15°W	ST1914
Churchstoke	Powys	52.53°N 03.07°W	SO2794
Churchstow	Devon	50.29°N 03.81°W	SX7145
Church Stowe	Northamptonshire	52.20°N 01.07°W	SP6357
Church Street	Essex	52.05°N 00.60°E	TL7943
Church Street	Kent	51.43°N 00.45°E	TQ7174
Church Stretton	Shropshire	52.53°N 02.81°W	SO4593
Churchton	Pembrokeshire	51.71°N 04.70°W	SN1305
Church Town	Cornwall	50.22°N 05.24°W	SW6941
Church Town	Leicestershire	52.74°N 01.42°W	SK3916
Church Town	North Lincolnshire	53.54°N 00.82°W	SE7806
Church Town	Surrey	51.24°N 00.06°W	TQ3551
Churchtown	Cornwall	50.56°N 04.69°W	SX0977
Churchtown	Cumbria	54.76°N 02.99°W	NY3641
Churchtown	Derbyshire	53.15°N 01.61°W	SK2662
Churchtown (Bridgerule)	Devon	50.80°N 04.44°W	SS2803
Churchtown (Parracombe)	Devon	51.17°N 03.90°W	SS6744
Churchtown	Isle of Man	54.31°N 04.43°W	SC4294
Churchtown	Lancashire	53.88°N 02.79°W	SD4843
Churchtown	Sefton	53.65°N 02.98°W	SD3518
Churchtown	Shropshire	52.47°N 03.09°W	SO2687
Churchtown	Somerset	51.13°N 03.47°W	SS9738
Church Village	Rhondda Cynon Taff	51.56°N 03.32°W	ST0886
Church Warsop	Nottinghamshire	53.20°N 01.16°W	SK5668
Church Westcote	Gloucestershire	51.87°N 01.68°W	SP2220
Church Whitfield	Kent	51.15°N 01.30°E	TR3145
Church Wilne	Derbyshire	52.87°N 01.34°W	SK4431
Churchwood	West Sussex	50.96°N 00.56°W	TQ0119

==== Churn-Chuz ====
Location	Locality	Coordinates (links to map & photo sources)	OS grid reference
Churnet Grange	Staffordshire	53.06°N 02.03°W	SJ9852
Churscombe	Devon	50.44°N 03.59°W	SX8762
Churston Ferrers	Devon	50.38°N 03.54°W	SX9055
Churt	Surrey	51.13°N 00.78°W	SU8538
Churton	Cheshire	53.09°N 02.88°W	SJ4156
Churwell	Leeds	53.75°N 01.59°W	SE2729
Chute Cadley	Wiltshire	51.27°N 01.55°W	SU3153
Chute Forest	Wiltshire	51.26°N 01.56°W	SU3051
Chute Standen	Wiltshire	51.27°N 01.57°W	SU3053

=== Chw-Chz ===
Location	Locality	Coordinates (links to map & photo sources)	OS grid reference
Chweffordd	Conwy	53.23°N 03.75°W	SH8372
Chwilog	Gwynedd	52.91°N 04.33°W	SH4338
Chwitffordd	Flintshire	53.29°N 03.29°W	SJ1478
Chyandour	Cornwall	50.11°N 05.54°W	SW4730
Chyanvounder	Cornwall	50.05°N 05.28°W	SW6522
Chycoose	Cornwall	50.20°N 05.08°W	SW8038
Chynhale	Cornwall	50.12°N 05.30°W	SW6430
Chynoweth	Cornwall	50.12°N 05.44°W	SW5431
Chyvarloe	Cornwall	50.06°N 05.28°W	SW6523

== Ci ==
Location	Locality	Coordinates (links to map & photo sources)	OS grid reference
Cicelyford	Monmouthshire	51.72°N 02.72°W	SO5003
Cilau	Pembrokeshire	52.01°N 05.00°W	SM9439
Cilcain	Flintshire	53.17°N 03.24°W	SJ1765
Cilcennin	Ceredigion	52.21°N 04.16°W	SN5260
Cilcewydd	Powys	52.62°N 03.15°W	SJ2204
Cilfrew	Neath Port Talbot	51.68°N 03.78°W	SN7700
Cilfynydd	Rhondda, Cynon, Taff	51.61°N 03.33°W	ST0892
Cilgerran	Pembrokeshire	52.04°N 04.64°W	SN1942
Cilgwyn	Carmarthenshire	51.94°N 03.83°W	SN7429
Cilgwyn	Ceredigion	52.04°N 04.46°W	SN3141
Cilgwyn	Gwynedd	53.06°N 04.25°W	SH4954
Ciliau Aeron	Ceredigion	52.20°N 04.19°W	SN5058
Cill Amhlaidh	Western Isles	57.37°N 07.41°W	NF7545
Cill Donnain	Western Isles	57.21°N 07.40°W	NF7427
Cill Eireabhagh	Western Isles	57.41°N 07.29°W	NF8248
Cilmaengwyn	Neath Port Talbot	51.73°N 03.82°W	SN7406
Cilmery	Powys	52.14°N 03.46°W	SO0051
Cilsan	Carmarthenshire	51.87°N 04.05°W	SN5922
Ciltwrch	Powys	52.05°N 03.24°W	SO1540
Cilwendeg	Pembrokeshire	52.01°N 04.59°W	SN2238
Cilybebyll	Neath Port Talbot	51.72°N 03.82°W	SN7404
Cilycwm	Carmarthenshire	52.04°N 03.82°W	SN7540
Cimla	Neath Port Talbot	51.64°N 03.79°W	SS7696
Cinderford	Gloucestershire	51.81°N 02.50°W	SO6513
Cinder Hill	Bolton	53.54°N 02.36°W	SD7605
Cinder Hill	Dudley	52.54°N 02.11°W	SO9294
Cinder Hill	Kent	51.19°N 00.18°E	TQ5346
Cinder Hill	West Sussex	51.04°N 00.04°W	TQ3729
Cinderhill	Derbyshire	53.01°N 01.46°W	SK3646
Cinderhill	Nottinghamshire	52.98°N 01.21°W	SK5343
Cindery Island	Essex	51.80°N 01.03°E	TM090162
Cinnamon Brow	Cheshire	53.41°N 02.57°W	SJ6291
Cippenham	Berkshire	51.51°N 00.64°W	SU9480
Cippyn	Pembrokeshire	52.08°N 04.73°W	SN1347
Cirbhig	Western Isles	58.26°N 06.77°W	NB2041
Circebost	Western Isles	58.20°N 06.80°W	NB1834
Cirencester	Gloucestershire	51.70°N 01.97°W	SP0201
City	Powys	52.49°N 03.16°W	SO2189
City	The Vale Of Glamorgan	51.49°N 03.47°W	SS9878
City Dulas	Isle of Anglesey	53.35°N 04.31°W	SH4687
