= Kirktown =

Kirktown ("church town") is the name of several places in Scotland:

- Kirktown of Fetteresso, near Stonehaven, Aberdeenshire
- Kirktown of Mortlach, in Dufftown, Moray
- Kirktown of St Fergus, in St Fergus, Aberdeenshire

== See also ==
- Kirkton (disambiguation)
- Churchtown (disambiguation)
