= Sheffield Park =

Sheffield Park may refer to:

== United Kingdom ==
=== Sheffield, South Yorkshire ===
- Sheffield Park (UK Parliament constituency), a parliamentary constituency
- Sheffield Park Academy, a secondary school

=== East Sussex ===
- Sheffield Park cricket ground, near Uckfield
- Sheffield Park and Garden, a garden. Formerly an estate called "Sheffield Park" when Earl of Sheffield lived there
- Sheffield Park railway station, the southern terminus of the Bluebell Railway

== Elsewhere ==
- Sheffield Park (Charlotte, North Carolina), a park in Charlotte, North Carolina, US

== See also ==
- Sherfield Park, a civil parish in Hampshire, England
