= Sherfield =

Sherfield may refer to:

== People ==
- Baron Sherfield, a title in the Peerage of the United Kingdom
- Grant Sherfield (born 1999), American basketball player in the Israeli Basketball Premier League
- Henry Sherfield (died 1634), English lawyer and politician
- Trent Sherfield (born 1996), American football wide receiver

== Places ==
- Sherfield English, a village and civil parish in Test Valley district, Hampshire
- Sherfield on Loddon, a village and civil parish in Basingstoke and Deane, Hampshire
- Sherfield Park, a civil parish in the Basingstoke and Deane district of Hampshire, England
