= Church Green =

Church Green may refer to:

- In the United Kingdom
  - Church Green, Tyne and Wear, England
  - Church Green, Witney, Oxfordshire, England
  - Church Green, Worcestershire, a district of Redditch
  - Church Green, Devon, Devon
- In the United States
  - Church Green (Taunton, Massachusetts)
  - Church Green Buildings Historic District, Boston, Massachusetts
