= Churchtown =

Churchtown or Church Town may refer to:

== England ==
- Churchtown, Cornwall, various places
- Churchtown, Cumbria, a United Kingdom location
- Churchtown, Derbyshire, a United Kingdom location
- Churchtown, Devon, a United Kingdom location
- Churchtown, Lancashire
- Churchtown, Lincolnshire, Belton, North Lincolnshire
- Churchtown, Merseyside (historically in Lancashire)
- Churchtown, Shropshire
- Churchtown, Somerset

== Isle of Man ==
- Churchtown, Isle of Man, a United Kingdom location

== Northern Ireland ==
- Churchtown, County Tyrone, a townland in County Tyrone, Northern Ireland

== Republic of Ireland ==
- Churchtown, County Cork
- Churchtown, County Kildare, a civil parish of Ireland
- Churchtown, County Westmeath (civil parish), a civil parish in the barony of Rathconrath]
- Churchtown, County Wexford; see List of shipwrecks in February 1823
- Churchtown, Dublin, a suburb in south Dublin, Ireland
- Churchtown, Kilmacnevan, a townland in the civil parish of Kilmacnevan, barony of Moygoish, County Westmeath
- Churchtown, Rathconrath, a townland in the civil parish of Churchtown, barony of Rathconrath, County Westmeath

== United States ==
- Churchtown, Iowa
- Churchtown, New Jersey
- Churchtown, Ohio
- Churchtown, Pennsylvania

== See also ==
- Kirkton (disambiguation), Scottish name for a small church settlement
