= Chipley =

Chipley may refer to:

- Chipley, Florida, a city in Washington County, Florida, United States
- Chipley, Georgia or Pine Mountain, Harris County, Georgia
- Chipley, Somerset, a United Kingdom location
- Chipley Priory, a medieval Augustine priory near Clare, Suffolk, United Kingdom

== People with the surname ==
- Bill Chipley, American football player
- William Dudley Chipley, American railroad tycoon and statesman
