= Listed buildings in St Kew, Cornwall =

St Kew is a churchtown and civil parish in Cornwall, United Kingdom.

== Key ==
Grade	Criteria
I	Buildings of exceptional interest, sometimes considered to be internationally important
II*	Particularly important buildings of more than special interest
II	Buildings of national importance and special interest

== St Kew ==
Name and location	Photograph	Date	Notes	Grade
Chapel Amble Cross in St Kew Churchyard; 50.55837°N 4.79500°W	—	9th to 15th-century	Medieval wayside cross with an upright granite shaft and a round ″wheel″ head. Overall height of 1;58 m.	II
Cross 7 Metres to East of South Aisle of Church of St James; 50.558204°N 4.794222°W	—	9th to 15th-century	Medieval granite wheelhead cross with moulded shaft and raised pathe cross on both faces of the head with one side of the head broken off.	II
Cross 30 Metres to North West of West Tower of Church of St James; 50.55837°N 4.79501°W	—	9th to 15th-century	Medieval, granite monolith churchyard cross with a chamfered shaft and an approximate height of 1.6 metres (5 ft 3 in). Both faces have a raised pathe cross.	II
Polrode Cross; 50.55820°N 4.79422°W	—	9th to 15th-century	Medieval wayside cross with a round wheel head set on a rectangular section shaft and modern base. The upper section of the cross was, in 1896, used as part of a footbridge at Polrode Mill and moved to the churchyard in c.1908. The lower section of the shaft was used as a jambe of the kitchen fireplace at Higher Polrode Farmhouse. In 1926 the two sections were reunited and re-erected on a modern base.	II
Church of St James; 50.558152°N 4.794516°W	—	c. 15th century	The circa 15th century parish church (restored in 1883) has stone ashlar walls, moulded plinth and a slate roof. Nave and chancel are in one and the c.15 century perpendicular tracery is largely intact with heads of tracery to the north and south aisles; which are partly renewed or restored. The west tower has three stages with turret stair on the south side; set back and stepped buttresses and partly renewed battlemented parapet with corner pinnacles. The c.15 century octagonal font has a moulded cornice and band of quatrefoils, and the c.17 century timber pulpit has carved panels.	I
Bokelly; 50.55999°N 4.76806°W	—	Possibly 17th-century or earlier	Possible 17th-century two storey house with basement, built on an earlier site and remodelled in the mid 19th-century. Built of stone rubble with renewed scantle slate roof, cross wing on the left with hipped ends, and a hipped end on the right. Bokelly was the ancient seat of the Bokelly family and later residence of the Carnsew family.	II
Barn 30 Metres to North of Bokelly; 50.56028°N 4.76793°W	—	Possibly 17th-century or earlier	Stone rubble barn with large dressed quoins. Roof is rag slate with half-hipped ends and has lower hipped ends over central midstrey.	II*
Carns Farmhouse; 50.55508°N 4.81550°W	—	Mid to early 17th-century	Stone rubble farmhouse with interesting 17th-century plan and central unheated room of a rare type in Cornwall. Has a steeply pitched slate roof with gable ends and stone rubble end stacks.	II
Tombchest of John Carne 1 Metre to South of South Aisle of Church of St James; 50.558147°N 4.794388°W	—	1709	Ashlar stone chest with a slate lid. The lid has an incised panel with nowy-head at the top and bottom with an engraved inscription in upper and lower case lettering with serifs. There is a coat of arms on the lid with a pelican pecking its breast.	II
Gate Piers 125 Metres to North West of Skidson; 50.5586°N 4.7939°W	—	c. 18th century	Pair of slender granite monolith gate-piers which have a square plan with ball finials; which adjoin an outer pair of gate-piers made of ashlar stone, with square-on-plan with moulding caps. The inner gate-piers may be reset.	II
Barn 20 Metres to South East of Fentengo Farmhouse; 50.58494°N 4.75482°W	—	Mid-18th-century	Two storey rectangular band barn with cob and slate rubble walls, and large dressed quoins. Steep pitched rag slate roof with hipped ends.	II
Headstone of Elizabeth Burton 4.5 Metres to South of South Aisle of Church of St James; 50.55804°N 4.79449°W	—	Mid-18th-century	Slate headstone with lower case lettering with serifs, in the memory of Elizabeth, wife of Thomas Burton. Circa mid-18th century with obscured date.	II
Headstone of Joseph Braydown 3 Metres to West of West Tower of Church of St James; 50.55810°N 4.79481°W	—	Mid 18th-century	Thick stone headstone with triple-pointed head and a partly eroded inscription, in the memory of Joseph Braydown. Circa mid-18th century with obscured date.	II
Headstone of William Martin 4 Metres to North of West Tower of Church of St James; 50.55818°N 4.79480°W	—	Mid 18th-century	Slate headstone with nowy-head and inscription in upper and lower case lettering with serifs.	II
Tombchest of John Hickes 1 Metre to South of South Aisle of Church of St James; 50.558109°N 4.794456°W	—	1754	Stone rubble and ashlar stone chest with a slate lid. Large upper and lower case lettering in an incised panel with nowy-head.	II
Two tombchests, Church of St James Churchyard, 1 m east of church 50.55824°N 4.79430°W	—	1760	Tombchests of the Reverend Read (died 1760) which is constructed of ashlar stone, granite cornice and slate lid, and James Read (1800) which is a brick chest with slate lid.	II
Headstone of William Webber 3 m to the east of the chancel of the Church of St James; 50.55828°N 4.79427°W	—	1762	Slate headstone to William Webber, with a nowy head and a crude angel's head above upper and lower case lettering.	II
Headstone of Phillip Higgs 0.25 Metres to South of South Aisle of Church of St James; 50.558109°N 4.794456°W	—	1766	Slate headstone with stepped shoulders and nowy-head. Incised decoration of crude angel's head, skull and crossed bones and a heart. Inscripton in upper and lower case lettering with serifs.	II
Group of 3 Tombchests of George Wilce, John Soper and John Soper, 8-10 Metres to South of South Aisle of Church of St James; 50.558011°N 4.794408°W	—	1772	The earliest from 1772 is an ashlar stone chest with slate lid, the second dated 1777 is also an ashlar stone chest with a slate lid and has a moulded cornice with an angel's head and inscription and the 1778 tombchest is made of brick with a slate lid.	II
Tombchest Philippa Grose 2 Metres to South West of East Gate of Churchyard; 50.558198°N 4.794123°W	—	1773	Slate stone chest with a slate lid which has an inscription in upper and lower case lettering with serifs.	II
2 Headstones of William and Mary Inch and William Pooley, 5 Metres to South of South Aisle of Church of St James; 50.558036°N 4.794480°W	—	1776	Two slate headstones; the earlier with nowy-head and the later with nowy-head and curved corners. Both are inscribed with upper and lower case lettering with serifs.	II
Headstone of William Thomas 7 Metres to South of East End of South Aisle of Church of St James; 50.558095°N 4.794272°W		1777	Rectangular slate headstone with high quality decoration of five angels heads and scroll work around the inscription ″My Pilgrimage on Earth was but a Span Altho I lived beyond the age of Man With my Friend in peace I spend my Day in hopes it was to my Redamers praise″	II
Tombchest of Constantine Moyle Et Alia, 7.5 Metres to South of South Aisle of Church of St James; 50.558077°N 4.794271°W	—	1781	Slate stone rubble chest with a slate lid which is inscribed in upper and lower case letters with serifs.	II
Headstone of Ann Soper, Directly to East of Tombchest of John Soper, 8 Metres to South of South Aisle of Church of St James; 50.558011°N 4.794394°W	—	1784	Slate rectangular headstone with upper and lower case letters with serifs. There is a crude angel's head with verse.	II
Headstone of Lucy Hewett 6.5 Metres to South of West End of South Aisle of Church of St James; 50.55801°N 4.79458°W	—	1785	Rectangular slate headstone with moulded corners; the inscription is in upper and lower case letters with serifs.	II
Headstone of Walter and Ann Beer 4 Metres to West of East Gate to Churchyard; 50.558232°N 4.794195°W	—	1789	Rectangular slate headstone with inscription in upper and lower case with serfs	II
Headstone of Christopher Hamby 12 Metres to West of Tower of Church of St James; 50.558088°N 4.794964°W	—	1791	Slate headstone with rounded corners and an inscription in upper and lower case letters with serifs.	II
Headstone of Jenefer and Betsey Wilton 10.5 Metres to South of Chancel of Church of St James; 50.33288°N 4.47420°W	—	1793	Slate rectangular headstone decorated with a floral trail. The inscription is in upper and lower case lettering with serifs.	II
Tombchest of Mary Grose 9 Metres to South of East End of Chancel to Church of St James; 50.558160°N 4.794219°W	—	1794	Brick tombchest with slate lid. The inscription is in upper and lower case lettering with serifs. Inscription reads as ″Weep not for me my Parents dear Because I'm gone so soon. The morning sun that shines so bright it often clouds at noon″.	II
Headstone of Catherine Higgs 6 Metres to South West of West Tower of Church of St James; 50.58804°N 4.79477°W	—	1810	1810 slate headstone with engraved inscription in incised aedicular surround.	II
Barn and Horse Engine House 10 Metres to North West of Trentinney Farmhouse; 50.56541°N 4.88217°W	—	Early 19th-century	Circa early 19th-century, stone rubble, rectangular, 2 storey barn, probably originally with a T-shaped plan, with shippon on ground floor and threshing floor above and built at right angles, a horse engine house to the rear. Has a slate roof with gable ends and the horse engine house has a curved end and semi-conical roof which sweeps down to near ground level as the ground rises to the rear.	II
Barn 50 Metres to North East of Rooke Farmhouse; 50.55191°N 4.83126°W	—	Early 19th-century	Rectangular plan, two storey barn with stone rubble walls, granite quoins and slate stone galetting. Rag slate roof with hipped ends. Undershot water wheel in c. mid 19th-century extension.	II
Barns 10m to North of Trewane; 50.57430°N 4.76914°W	—	Early 19th-century	A range of barns, with rectangular plan, possibly early 19th-century on the left and mid to late 19th-century to the right. Originally, it probably consisted of a shippon, stable and cartsheds with the earlier part of the building incorporating several reused dressed granite, including mullions, cills and lintels. To the right consists of slatestone rubble with rag slate roof.	II
Chapel Amble Forge Shop; 50.33288°N 4.47420°W	—	Early 19th-century	Originally a smithy with forge on the rear wall and small store adjoining on the left-handed gable end. Converted to a craft shop.	II
Dinham's Bridge; 50.53171°N 4.77885°W		Early 19th-century	Narrow stone rubble bridge with stone rubble parapets, moulded granite coping and dressed stone round arch. (On boundary of St Kew and St Mabyn parishes).	II
St Catherines; 50.547670°N 4.776983°W	—	Early 19th century	Original plan was two storey, two-room central cottage with central entrance, flanked by two one-room cottages. Now converted to one house and the central entrance blocked. Built of rendered and painted stone rubble with rag slate roof with gable ends. The gable ends have brick chimney stacks and two axial stacks heating two rooms of the central cottage.	II
St Kew Inn; 50.5586°N 4.7939°W		Early 19th century	Originally a house and now a public house with slate roof, Built of stone rubble with large granite quoins and brick dressings, to segmental arched window openings.	II
Headstone of John Worden 1 Metre to North East of East Corner of North Aisle of Church of St James; 50.558299°N 4.794411°W	—	1817	Rectangular, slate headstone with an inscription in incised adeicular surround with sun-bursts in the left and right-hand corners.	II
Granary 30 Metres to North East of Trescobel; 50.558052°N 4.792321°W	—	c. 1820	Square plan, timber-framed, slate-hung granary with scantle slate pyramid roof. The granary is raised above the ground on three rows of three granite straddle stones. The timber plank door is reached by stone rubble steps.	II
Footbridge at Ford 150 Metres to South of Barton Farmhouse; 50.557151°N 4.795402°W	—	mid-19th century	A simple footbridge, on the clapper bridge principal, with stone rubble abutments and a central pier with cut water on the east side. Spanned by granite lintels.	II
Granary 3 Metres to West of Barton Farmhouse; 50.557993°N 4.795904°W	—	c. mid-19th century	Probably, originally a stable on the ground floor with a granary above. Rectangular plan with stone rubble walls with a rag slate roof with half-hipped ends. At the rear there are stone rubble steps to a plank door to the granary.	II
Tombchest of Thomas May Kelly Et Alia 6.5 Metres to South of South Aisle of Church of St James; 50.558027°N 4.794480°W		1856	Delabole slate tombchest with a moulded base and cornice, and high quality panelled and carved sides.	II
Gate Piers and Holy Well 120 Metres to South East of Trescobel; 50.557272°N 4.791851°W	—	1890	Entrance gateway, situated at the main entrance to the former Rectory, with a pair of ashlar gate piers and pyramidal granite caps. The ashlar flanking quadrant walls have granite coping, ending with square piers and pyramidal granite caps. The holy well is in a stone rubble well house, partly incorporated into, and behind the left hand wall.	II
K6 Telephone Kiosk to East of Church; 50.5586°N 4.7939°W	—	1935	Cast iron, square kiosk with a domed roof. There are unperforated crowns on the top panels and margin glazing to the door and windows.	II
