= Longbridge Mill =

Watermill in Sherfield on Loddon, Hampshire, England

Coordinates: 51.318645°N 1.022324°W

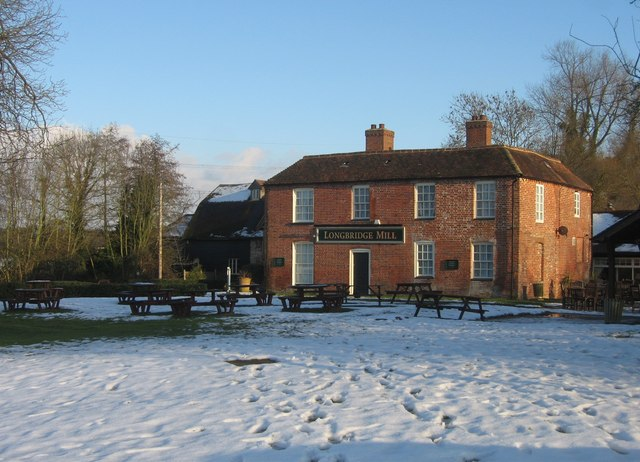
Longbridge Mill.

Longbridge Mill is a restored grade II listed water mill situated on the River Loddon in the village of Sherfield on Loddon in the English county of Hampshire. The mill is now incorporated into a public house and restaurant, but is still occasionally used for demonstration millings.

Whilst there is evidence that a mill has existed on the site for 800 years, sources differ on the age of the current building, with estimates between the 15th century and the 17th century for the oldest parts. It has a brick-built main block with two storeys and an attic, a tiled mansard roof and two gabled dormers. Weather-boarded extensions house the water wheels, and there are timber-framed extensions to north and south. The interior has massive timbers and remains of old machinery.

Milling at the site continued until 1977. In 1991, a major fire destroyed some of the buildings, and the remainder were abandoned. In 1996, the buildings were bought for conversion to a public house and restaurant.
