= Kirkton =

Kirkton ("church town") may refer to:

== Places ==
=== Canada ===
- Kirkton, Ontario, a community within South Huron, Huron County, Ontario
- Kirkton, Perth County, Ontario, a community within Perth South, Perth County, Ontario

=== Scotland ===
- Kirkton, Dumfries and Galloway, a village
- Kirkton, Dundee, a residential area
- Kirkton, Livingston, an area of Livingston
- Kirkton, Scottish Borders, a village
- Kirkton of Auchterhouse, in Auchterhouse, Angus
- Kirkton of Auchterless, commonly known as Auchterless, Aberdeenshire
- Kirkton of Durris, in Durris, Aberdeenshire
- Kirkton of Glenisla, in Glen Isla, Angus
- Kirkton of Kingoldrum, in Angus
- Kirkton of Largo, an alternative name of Upper Largo, Fife
- Kirkton of Maryculter, commonly known as Maryculter, Aberdeenshire
- Kirkton of Skene, in Skene, Aberdeenshire
- Kirkton of Strathmartine, previous name of Bridgefoot, a village in Angus
- Kirkton of Tough, in the Marr area of Aberdeenshire
- Kirkton Avenue, a tower block housing complex in Knightswood, Glasgow

== People with the surname ==
- James Kirkton (1628–1699), Church of Scotland minister and author
- Jeanne Kirkton (born 1953), American politician

== See also ==
- Kirkton of Bourtie stone circle
- Kirktown (disambiguation)
- Churchtown (disambiguation)
