= St Kew =

Village in Cornwall, England

Coordinates: 50.558°N 4.795°W

St Kew: Cornish: Lanndoghow
- Location within Cornwall
- Population: 1,145 (United Kingdom Census 2011)
- OS grid reference: SX021769
- Civil parish: St Kew
- Unitary authority: Cornwall
- Ceremonial county: Cornwall
- Region: South West
- Country: England
- Sovereign state: United Kingdom
- Post town: BODMIN
- Postcode district: PL30
- Dialling code: 01208
- Police: Devon and Cornwall
- Fire: Cornwall
- Ambulance: South Western
- UK Parliament: North Cornwall

St Kew (Cornish: Lanndoghow) is a village in Cornwall, England, United Kingdom. It is also the name of the civil parish (known in Cornish as Pluw Gew), which includes the church town, St Kew, and nearby St Kew Highway (Fordhveur).

The parish is named for a Welsh saint, Cywa or Kew, possibly the sister of Docco, also known as: Docuin, Docwinn, Docquinn, who founded a monastery at or near the village of St Kew. The 15th-century church is now dedicated to St James.

== Place name ==
St Kew is mentioned in history earlier than any other place in Cornwall since it appears in the Life of St Samson. The life includes an account of the saint visiting a monastery called Docco which was over the seas (St Samson came from Wales). Docco is said to have come with his sister Kew from Gwent in south Wales to Cornwall and founded a religious centre known as Lan Docco. St Samson first visited Lan Docco when he came to Cornwall in the early 6th century, was greeted by Junavius and well treated there. Some have interpreted this to mean that Kew and Docco were either dead or not in charge of the centre by that time. Legend reports that Kew vowed to build a church at the spot where a bear that had been troubling the area was killed, this being considered to be the location of the current Church building. Kew's feast day is celebrated on 8 February in the Roman Catholic Church as well as the Eastern Orthodox Church.

Over time the place name became shortened from Landocco to Lannou or Lannow, and records from the 12th century use this name. There was a chapel dedicated to St Kew located at Lannou from before 1373, and in 1575 the place was referred to "Lannow alias St Kew" in the bishop's register thus bridging the older name used in documents with the name familiar at the time.

== History ==
There is a Cornish cross at Polrode Mill; its original site is unknown and the head has been damaged. Job's Cross is on the road from Trewethern to St. Kew.

St Kew was a large manor at the time of Domesday Book. There were 5 hides of land which included land for 22 ploughs. There were 59 villagers and 26 smallholders with 20 ploughs between them. Also 1-acre (4,000 m^{2}) of meadow, 40 acres (16 ha) of pasture and a large woodland; the livestock were 9 cattle and 120 sheep. The annual value was £6.

St Kew was part of the estate of Plympton Priory and later the Bishop of Exeter, before the dissolution of the monasteries. For many years, the manor was held by the Molesworth family.

At Bokelly there are a Tudor barn and a house which was apparently refronted in the late 17th century. The farmhouse at Bokelly was built in the 16th century and remodelled in the 18th; the outbuildings include a 16th-century barn and 19th-century granary and pigsties. In the late 16th century it was the home of William Carnsew, who wrote about his visits to other important houses in Cornwall.

Pengenna is a 17th-century manor house. The estate of Treharrack (grid reference SX018789) (also known as Treharrock and Trehannick) was submitted for public auction, by the owner Rev Gustavus Basset, on 8 October 1879; the estate consisted of approximately 230 acres (93 ha), a mansion, stables, coach-house, walled garden, greenhouse, etc. Basset had purchased the property, some years previous, for £11,000 and in 1879 was bought by Mr Magor of Lamellyn for £7,700. The manor, which was dismembered in circa 1700, belonged to the Treharrick family many years before the Reformation and passed by marriage to the Cavell family. A new house was built on the site in 1820.

Spoil-tips survive of Trevinnick mine which produced antimony, lead and zinc in the latter part of the 19th century.

== Church of St James ==
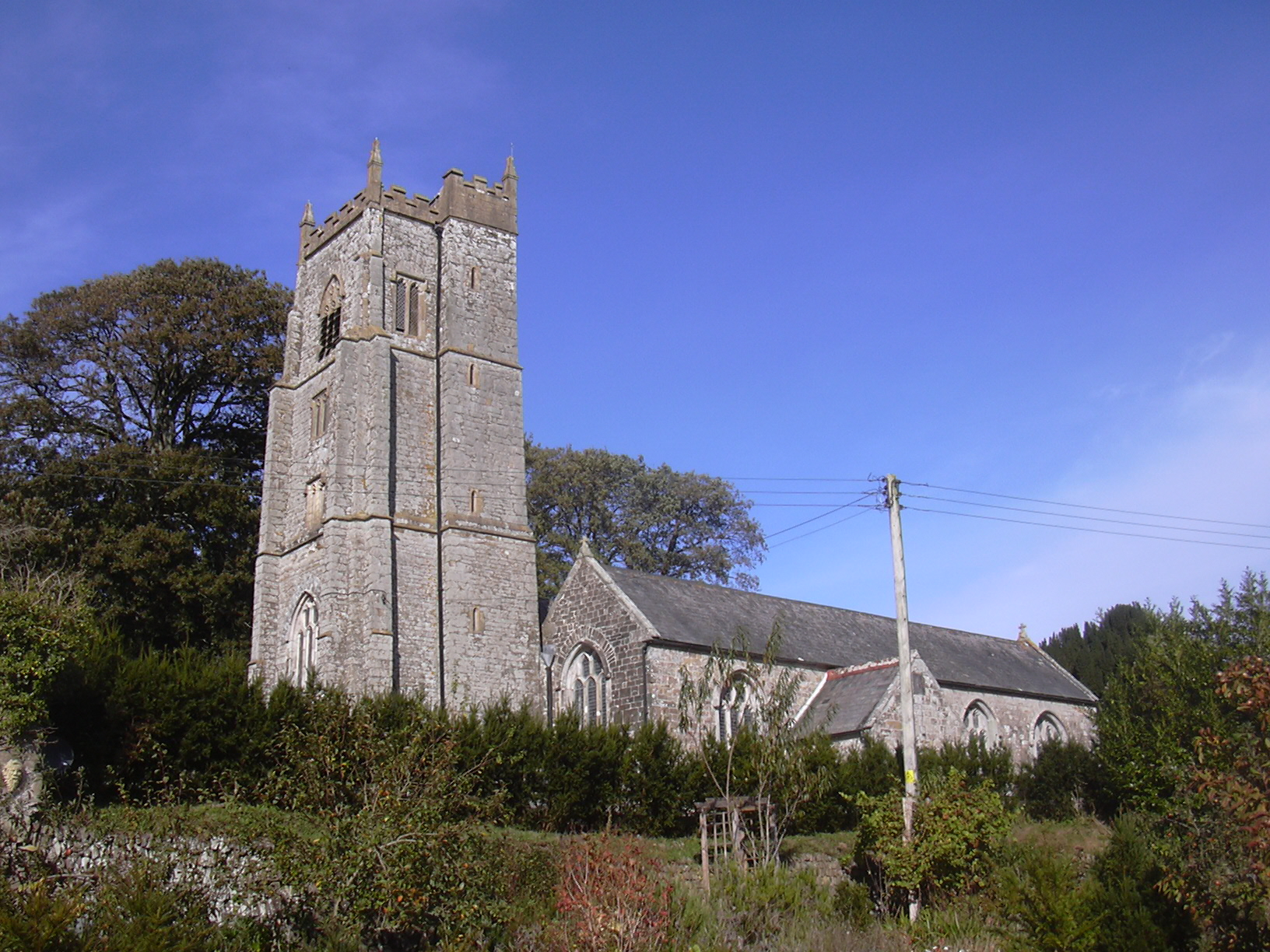
The Church of St James

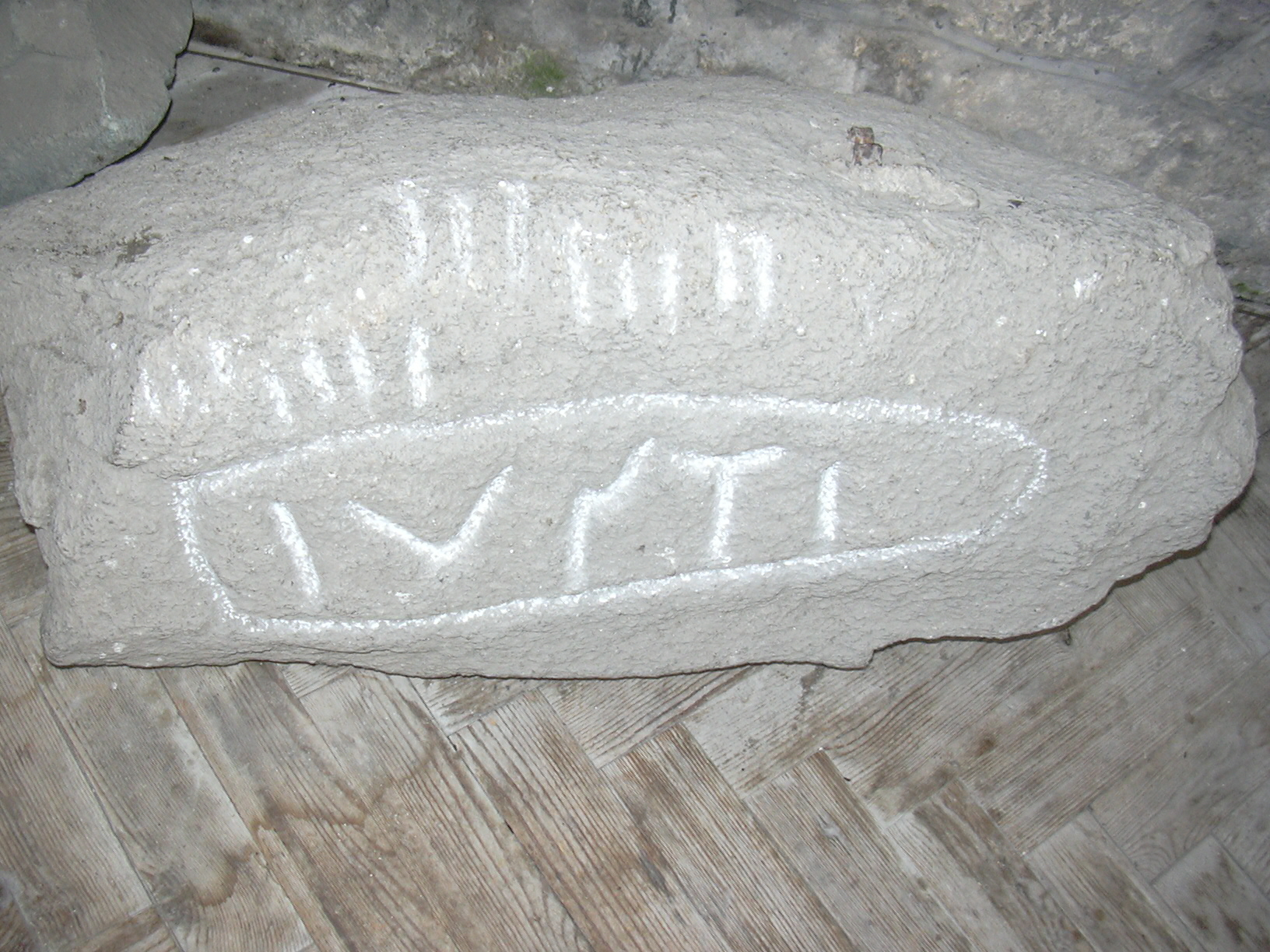
Ogham stone in the church of St James in the village of St. Kew

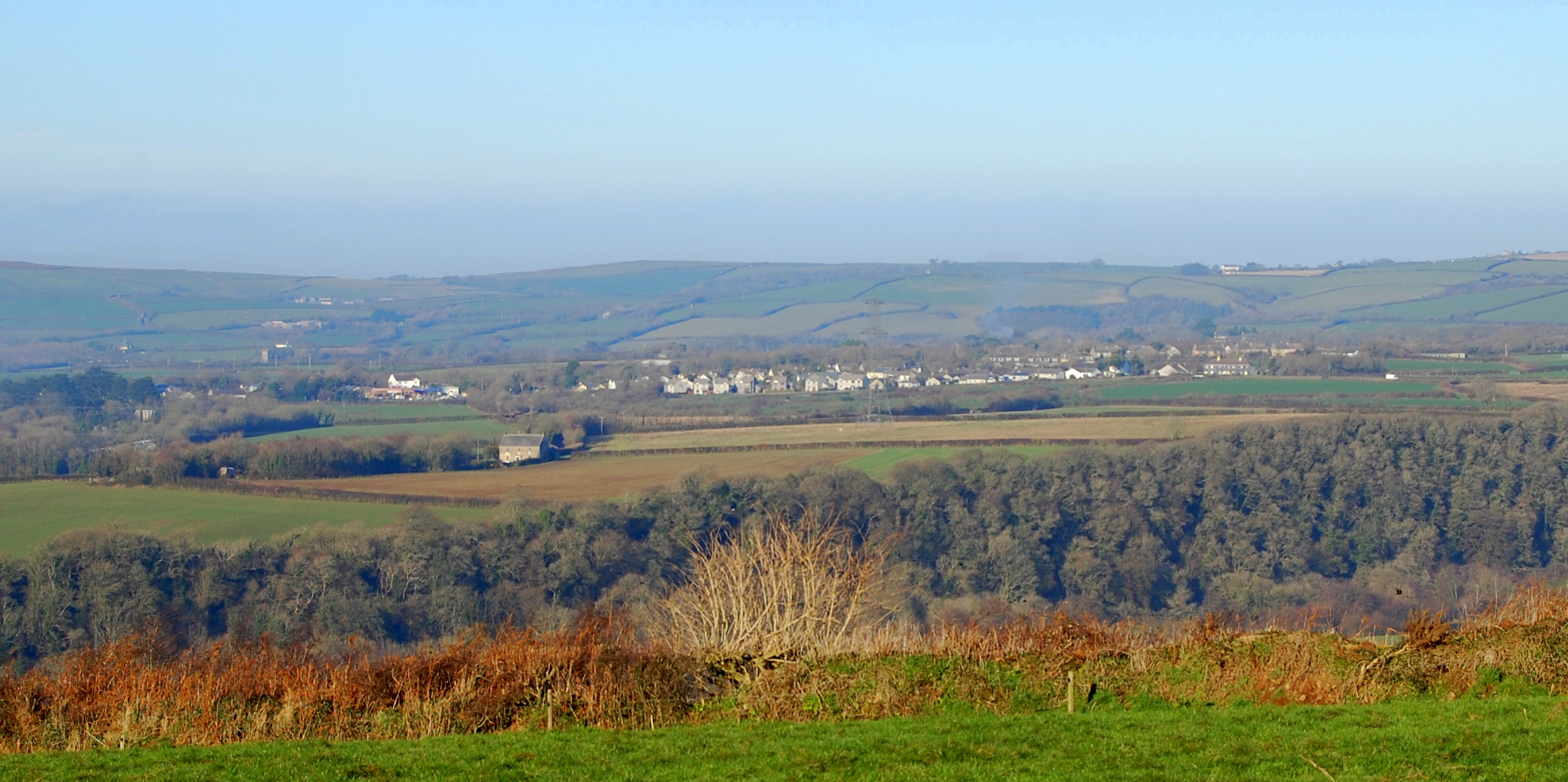
St Kew Highway viewed from St Mabyn

The 15th-century parish church, in the village of St Kew Churchtown, has important stained glass windows, including one depicting the Passion of Christ, which were restored in 2005. The windows were the most "memorable" part of Nikolaus Pevsner's visit. He also praised the pulpit: "Uncommonly good, Elizabethan, with ornamental panels ... ". He notes the carved capitals, the wagon roof, the 15th century font, bench ends, a 15th-century cross-head and the Royal Arms, in stone. There is a curious Ogham stone, found in a local farm, in the church. According to Charles Henderson, writing in the Cornish Church Guide (1925), the tracery and stonework of some windows at St Kew may have been transferred here from Bodmin Parish Church. The dedication was originally to St Docco but in the mid-15th century the patroness of a chapel (St Kewa, Virgin) nearby was transferred to the parish church when the church building was enlarged. Two other chapels existed in the parish in the late medieval period, one of St Wenna, and another of St Aldhelm at Chapel Amble. Edward Benson, the Bishop of Truro reopened the church on 24 July 1883 following a restoration.

=== Gallery: The church of St James ===
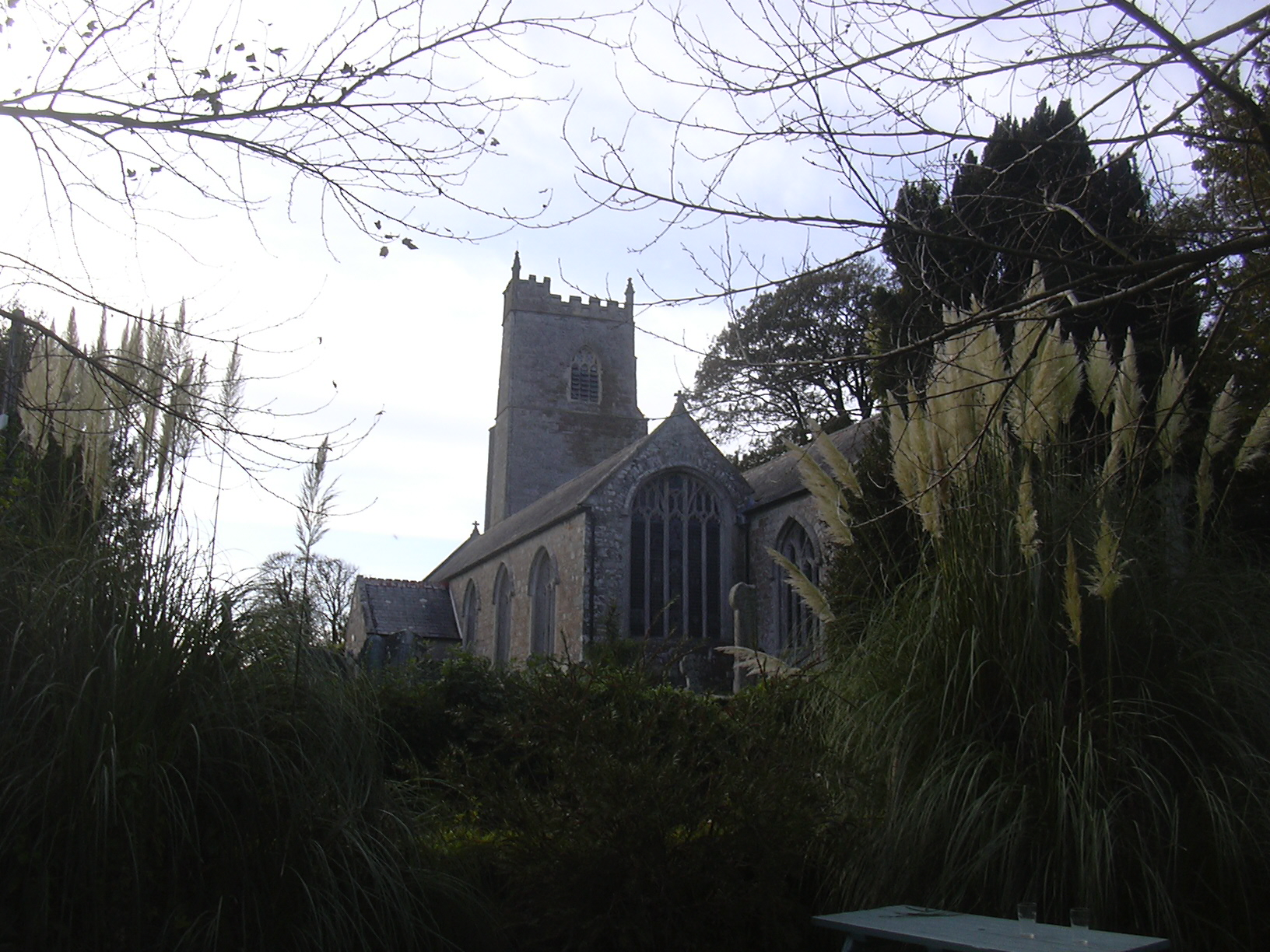
Church with ancient cross

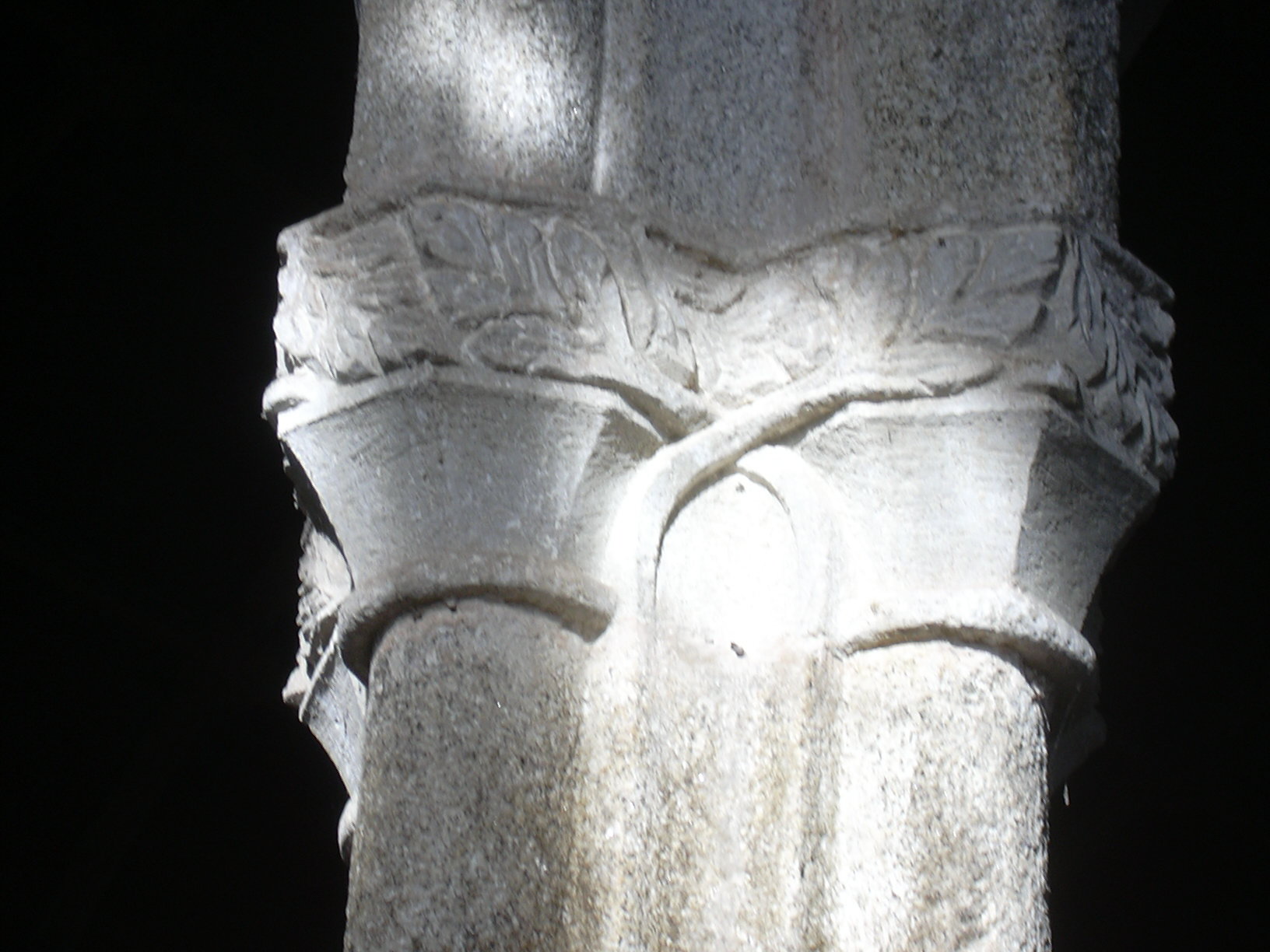
Decorated capital in the church

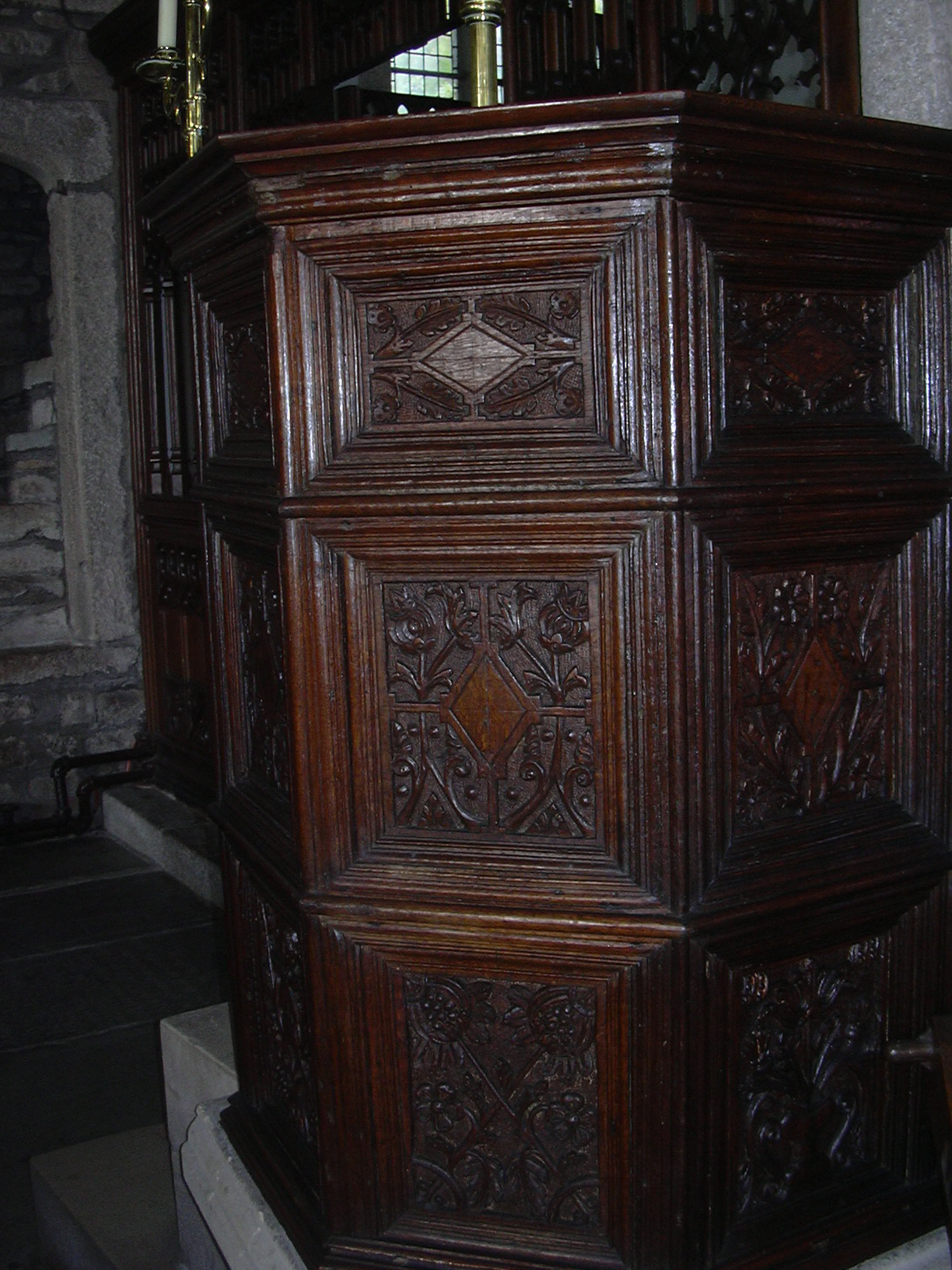
Pulpit of the church

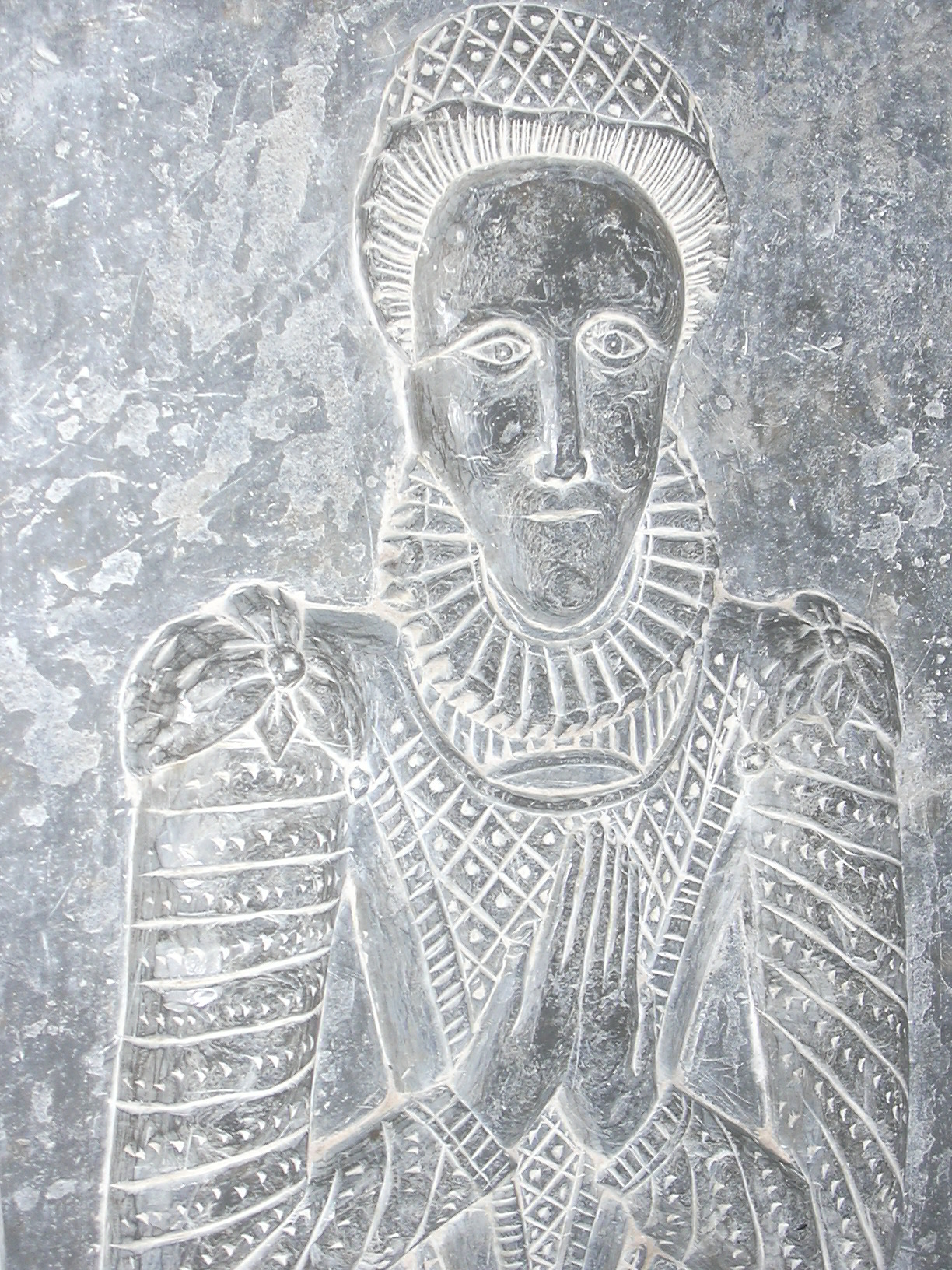
Detail of face – slate memorial at the church

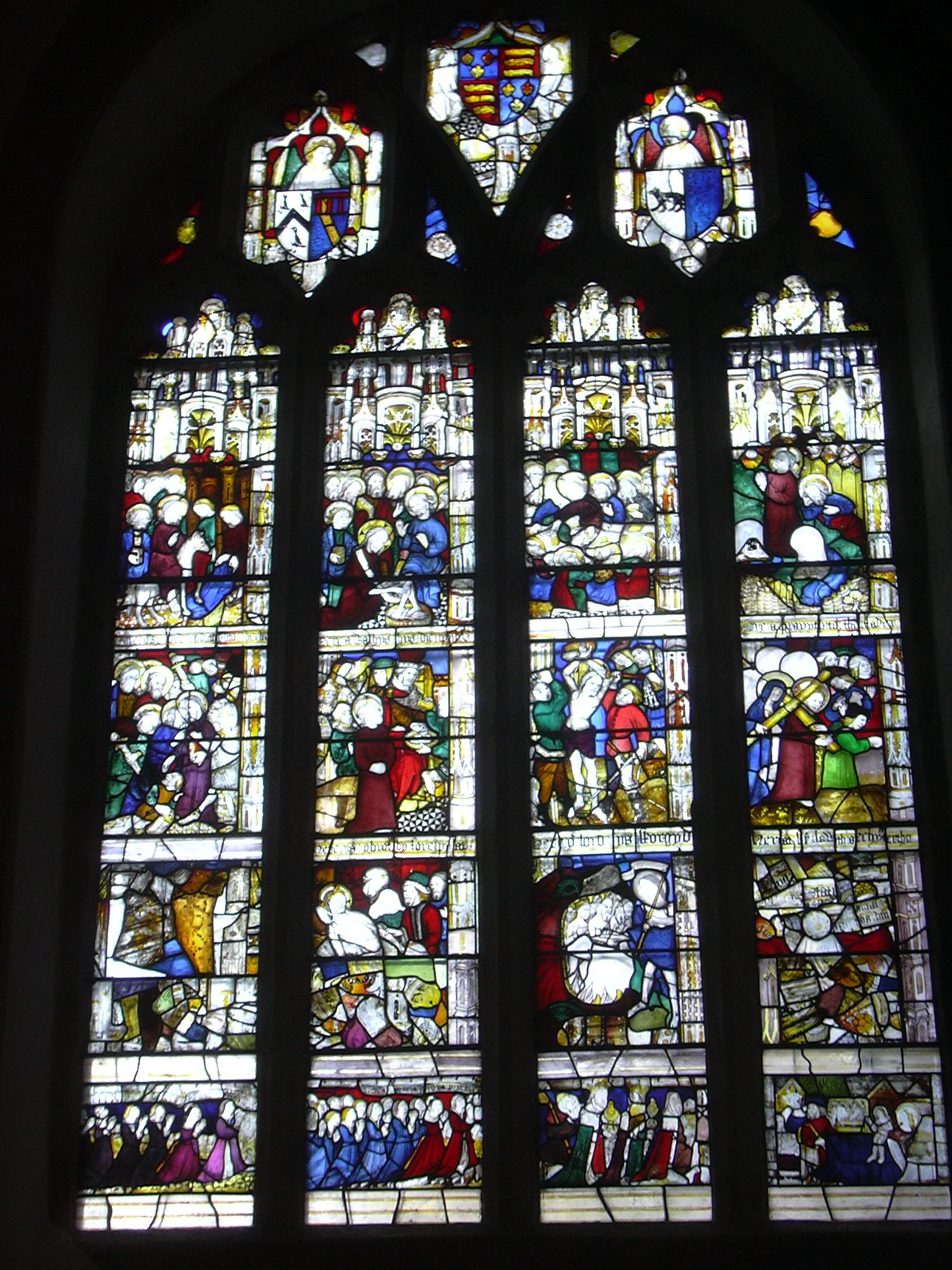
Passion of Christ at the church

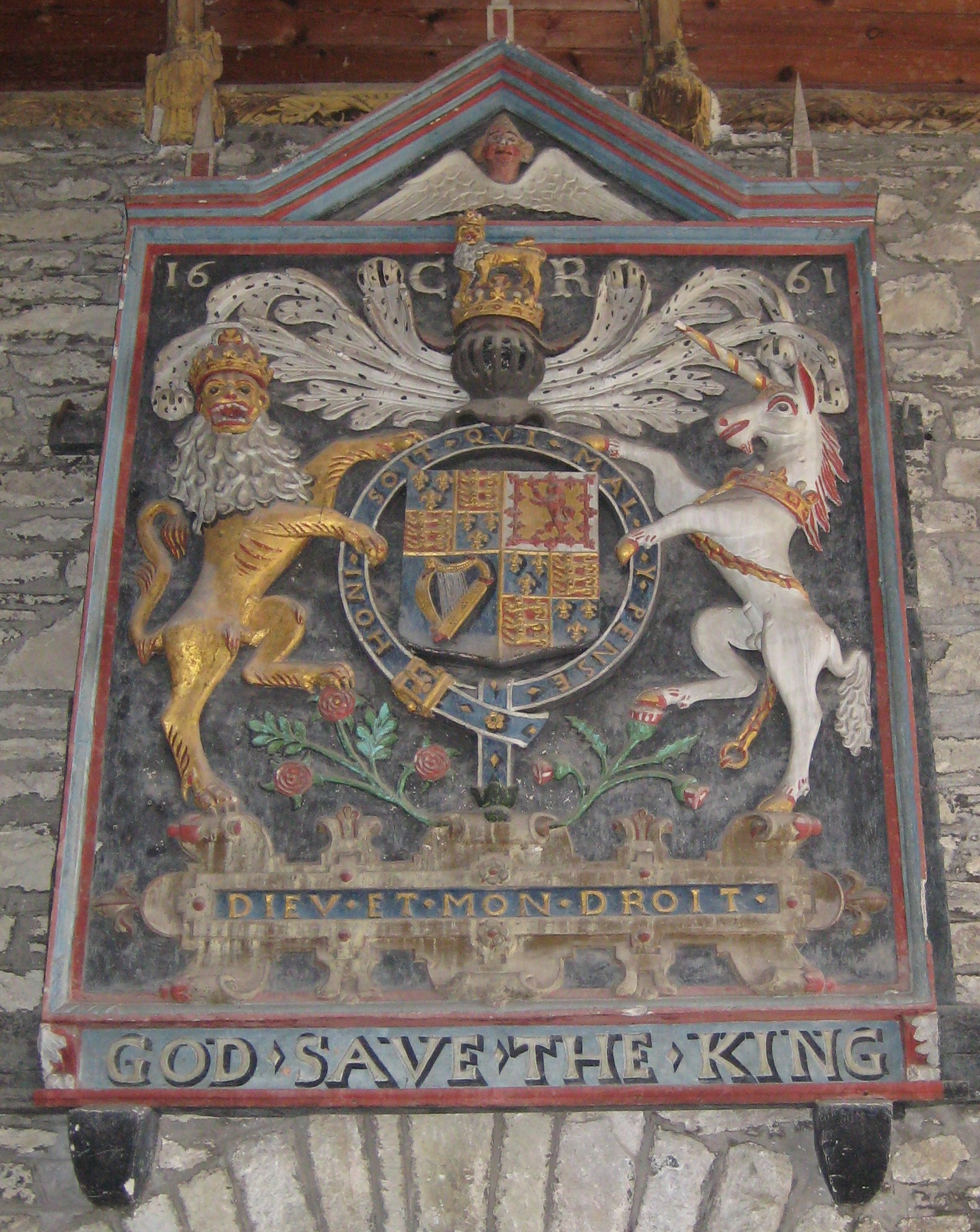
The arms of King Charles II, 1661

== St Kew Highway railway station ==
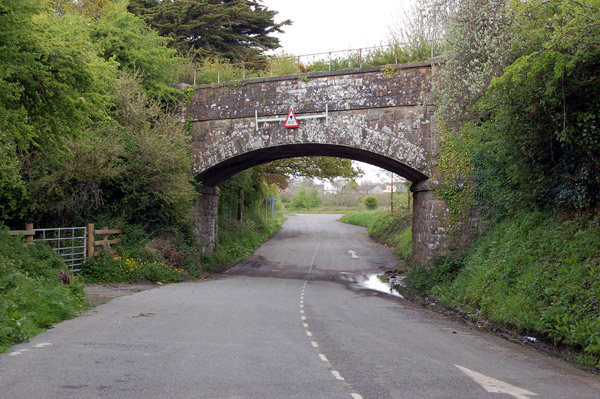
Railway bridge at St Kew Highway

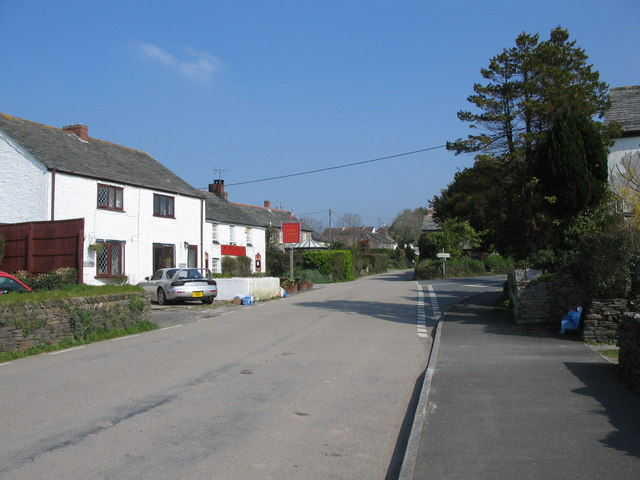
St Kew Highway

The station on the North Cornwall Railway opened on 1 June 1895, and had a passing loop and a single siding with headshunt that served a goods shed and loading dock. Both lines through the station had platforms although the down platform had no buildings and was only accessible via a foot crossing at the down end of the station. The station building itself, like the goods shed, was substantially constructed out of local stone, as was the locking room of the signal box. The passing loop was extended in 1939, but the up loop, sidings and signal box were taken out of use on 21 November 1965 as goods services had ceased on 7 September the previous year. Traffic was never very heavy and by the late 1930s was averaging five passengers per day, less than a third of that ten years earlier. The station was unmanned from 6 December 1965 and closed on 3 October 1966, although the building functioned for some time as a guest house but is now a private residence: it is partially visible from the A39.

== Cornish wrestling ==
Tournaments for prizes have been held in a field by the St Kew Inn for centuries.

At a famous match at St Kew in the 1820s, Abraham Bastard beat the much larger and more famous wrestler Polkinghorne. The fame he gained from this fight helped him in later life when he became a preacher.

Proctor Grose from St Kew was considered the strongest man in Cornwall and won many wrestling prizes in Devon and Cornwall in the early 1800s.

== Walmsley Sanctuary ==
The Cornwall Birdwatching and Preservation Society owns the Walmsley Sanctuary which covers over 20 hectares (49 acres) on the River Amble, a tributary of the River Camel, with two bird-hides for use by its members. The sanctuary is nationally important for wintering waders and wildfowl.

The sanctuary was purchased in 1939 with a legacy from Dr Robert Garrett Walmsley (d. 1939). The legacy was on condition that the society undertook "to provide and administer a Sanctuary for Migrating Waders within the Duchy of Cornwall".

== St Kew ACE Academy ==
The St Kew ACE Academy, formerly St Kew Community Primary School, campus includes an infant playground, large general playground with quiet garden, playing field with adventure equipment and science garden.

The building is all on one level and comprises three classrooms and additional teaching space. There is a pre-school room, library, reception and hall, with kitchen facilities. The school was originally located in the Parish Hall at the turn of the 20th century, and moved to its present location in 1928. Further extension and improvement in 1991 added a new wing. The school is part of Kernow Learning, a multi academy trust of primary schools across Cornwall.

== Notable residents ==
- Sir Edward Braddon (1829–1904), premier of Tasmania, was born in St Kew.
- Rev Thomas Hutton (1566–1639), Vicar of St Kew (January 1607 until his death in December 1639) and author of An Answer to Several Reasons for Refusall to Subscribe to the Book of Common Prayer (1605).

== See also ==
- Listed buildings in St Kew, Cornwall
