= The Loddon School =

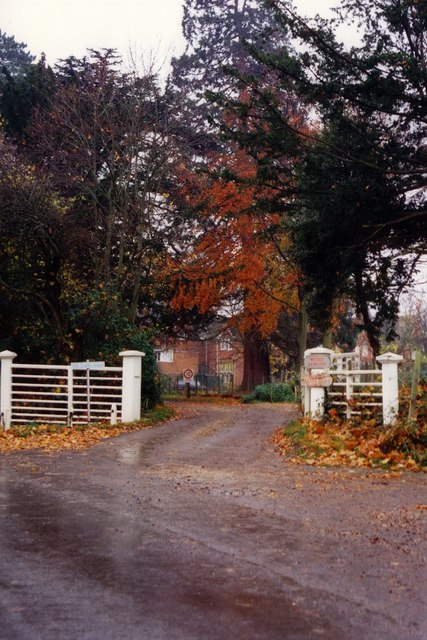
- Entrance to the Loddon School

Location
- Wildmoor Lane; Sherfield on Loddon, Hampshire, RG27 0JD; England; 51.3030°N 1.0315°W

Information
- Type: Private special school
- Motto: "Pathway to a fulfilling life"
- Established: 1988
- Founder: Marion Cornick
- Department for Education URN: 116589 Tables
- Ofsted: Reports
- Chair of Trustees: Graham Day
- CEO: Richard Kennett
- Staff: 180+
- Gender: Co-educational
- Age: 8 to 19
- Capacity: 30
- Website: www.loddonschool.org

The Loddon School is a British private school for children who have severe and complex learning difficulties. Children at the school have problems associated with autism and epilepsy, including self injury, aggression and disruptive behaviour. The school is on Wildmoor Lane in Sherfield on Loddon in the English county of Hampshire. It was founded in 1988 as a charitable trust and, as of 2025, caters for up to 30 children at one time, with over 180 staff providing education and care in a residential setting.

It has been identified as having innovative ways of supporting children.

== See also ==
- Education in England
