= Trewethern =

Hamlet in Cornwall, England

Coordinates: 50.555°N 4.8158°W

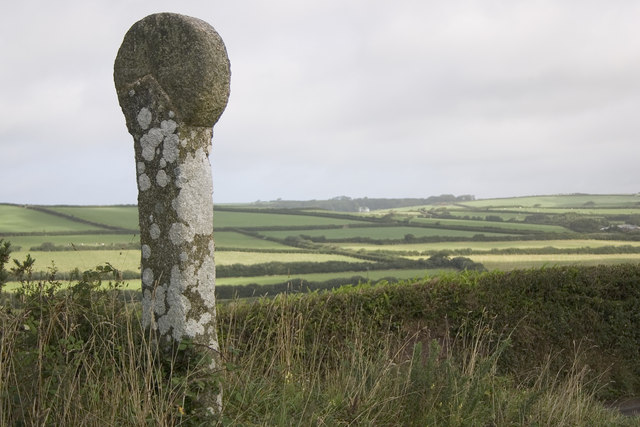
- Job's Cross near Trewethern

- Location within Cornwall
- OS grid reference: SX00647658
- Civil parish: St Kew
- Unitary authority: Cornwall
- Ceremonial county: Cornwall
- Region: South West
- Country: England
- Sovereign state: United Kingdom
- Post town: WADEBRIDGE
- Dialling code: 01208
- Police: Devon and Cornwall
- Fire: Cornwall
- Ambulance: South Western
- UK Parliament: North Cornwall

Trewethern is a hamlet in the Civil parish St Kew, Cornwall, England, United Kingdom. It contains four Grade II Listed buildings, being Trewethern Farmhouse, Threwethern Cottage, Carns Farmhouse and Walts Cottage, the buildings varying in date from the early 18th century back to the 15th century.

== History ==
While there is no entry in the Domesday Book for Trewethern, there is a record of a small settlement called Carmar which was at or very close to the current location of Trewethern. Carmar consisted of 3 smallholders and one slave, with ploughland sufficient for one plough and 10 acres (4.0 ha) of pasture supporting 40 sheep with the land held by Alward of Clyst under Count Robert of Mortain. The oldest records of Trewethern date from the reign of Queen Elizabeth I when Humphry Rescarock took Richard Mathewe to the Court of Chancery over a disputed property there while around the same time there was another dispute, also in the Court of Chancery, over the inheritance of the land of William Moncke "called Trewotheran ... in the parish of St Kew, Cornwall".

There were 22 households recorded at Trewethern in the 1841 United Kingdom census including a Blacksmith and the 1881 Ordnance Survey map shows a smithy.

Near Trewethern on the road to St Kew is a restored Cornish Cross known as Job's cross. This cross, medieval in origin, was discovered in 1906 being used as a gatepost about a mile away near Job's Tenement (hence the name) and was erected at its current location in 1952. The cross is a scheduled ancient monument being first scheduled in 1934.

== Notable people ==
John Symone (d. 1789) was purser on HMS Cornwall
