= Chineham =

Civil parish in Hampshire, England

Coordinates: 51.290694°N 1.051147°W

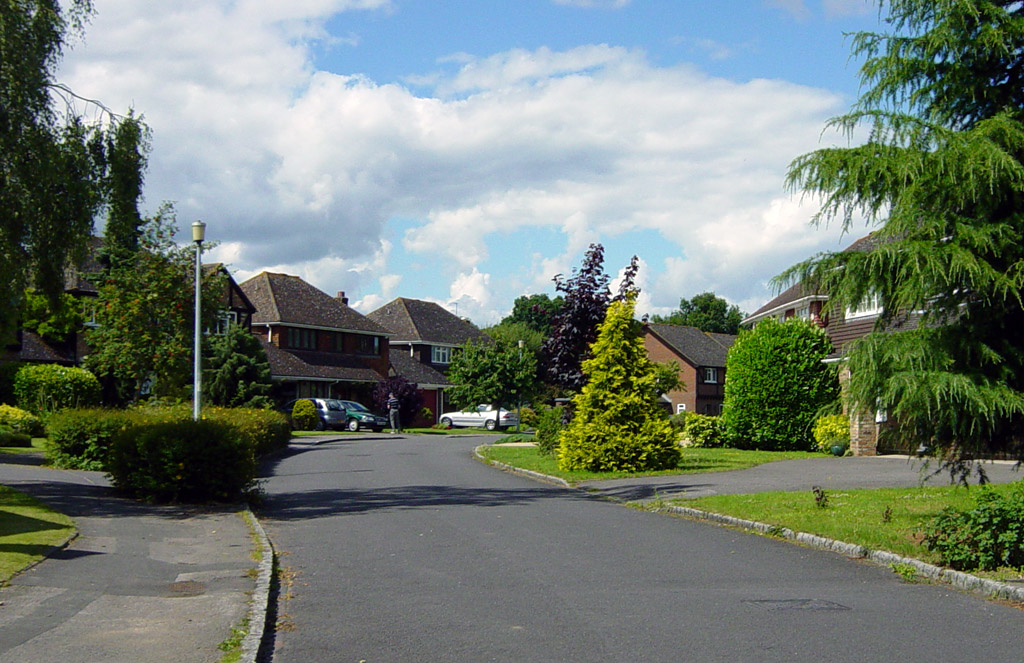
- A residential road in Chineham

- Location within Hampshire
- Population: 9,240 (2011 Census)
  - London: 42.8 miles (69 km) SW
- District: Basingstoke and Deane
- Shire county: Hampshire
- Region: South East
- Country: England
- Sovereign state: United Kingdom
- Post town: BASINGSTOKE
- Postcode district: RG24
- Dialling code: 01256
- Police: Hampshire and Isle of Wight
- Fire: Hampshire and Isle of Wight
- Ambulance: South Central
- UK Parliament: Basingstoke

Chineham (/ˈtʃɪnəm/ CHIN-əm) is a civil parish on the outskirts of Basingstoke, Hampshire, England. It is situated about 3 miles (5 km) northeast of central Basingstoke, just north of the A33 road between Basingstoke and Reading.

== Demography ==
=== Population ===
The population of Chineham in 2011 was 9,240 in 3,875 households.

=== Ethnicity ===
Ethnicity	%
White British	86.7
White Other	5.6
Asian	4.3
Mixed/Multiple	1.8
Black	1.2
Other	0.3
Arab	0.1

== History ==
The current parish was established in 1986, but the manor is much older and was first recorded in the Domesday Book as Chineham in Basingestoch Hundred – Hantescire in 1086.

The suffix “ham” name may suggest a farm or enclosure, and Coates suggests “Chine” is derived from the Old English 'cinu' which means a 'ravine or rift', which may refer to the way that the Basingstoke-Reading railway line passes between low hills in the vicinity, and implying that Chineham means 'rift estate'.

The ecclesiastical parish was formed in 1990, prior to this Chineham formed a detached part of the parish of Monk Sherborne, and its tithing was part of Basingstoke hundred.

Predating the manor but within the current parish, an Iron Age settlement has been excavated recently in Great Binfield Copse. The Agger of the Roman road from Silchester to Chichester uncovered during the laying of an electricity pipeline in 2002 and evidence of a Roman enclosure and metal working site found in Daneshill during the 1980s. Binfields Farm, now the site of Chineham District Centre, was first documented in 945 as Becmnit Felda (open land with bent grass).

By 1848, Chineham had developed into a tiny hamlet with 34 inhabitants,. In the same year, the Berks and Hants Railway was opened, crossing the Basingstoke to Reading road nearby. By the 1960s there were about seventy dwellings, mostly along the road from Basingstoke to Reading, with a small wooden church, a village shop, a petrol station, a small village hall, and a Toll House at the Reading end of the village.

Since the late-1970s, Chineham has developed into a sizeable residential suburb, and a bypass was constructed on the main A33 road so that the growing traffic flow was moved away from the housing areas. The railway has survived and prospered, as an increasingly important link between the port of Southampton and northern England. However, no passenger station has ever been built in Chineham, despite several recent attempts to promote one.

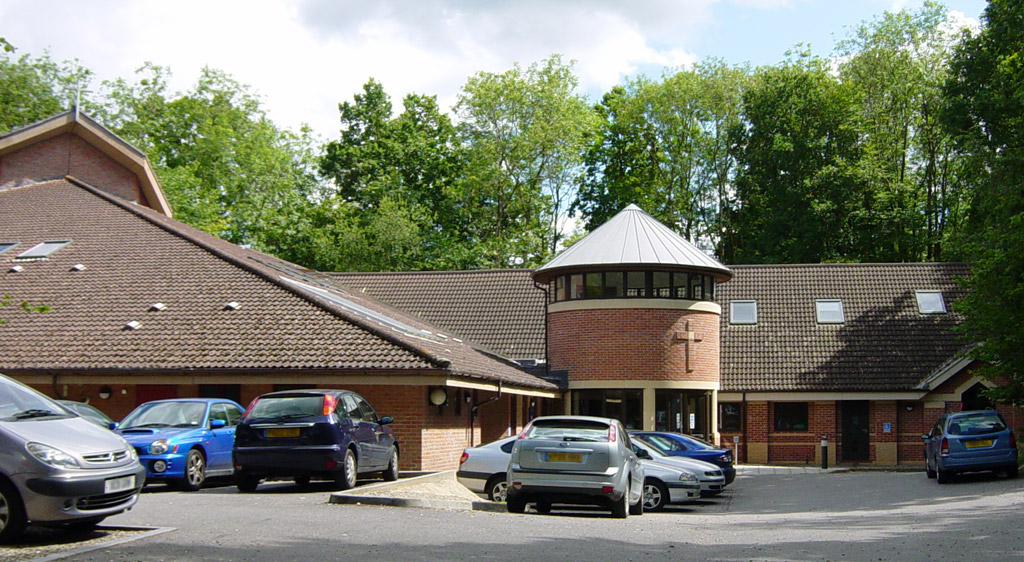
Christ Church, Chineham

Chineham District Centre is effectively the town centre with a wide array of high street retail outlets (including a Tesco superstore and branches of Boots, Marks & Spencer Food and Matalan) and a public library. There is also a large, modern business park called Chineham Park, which incorporates the Hampshire International Business Park, harbouring many offices of national and international organisations, including Techdata, Gist Limited, and Lenovo's Technology Centre.

Today Chineham is partly contiguous with the Basingstoke urban area and is generally considered one of the town's outer suburbs, though many residents perceive Chineham as more of a small satellite town. In fact Chineham has its own town sign on the A33 when approaching from Basingstoke.

== Chineham today ==
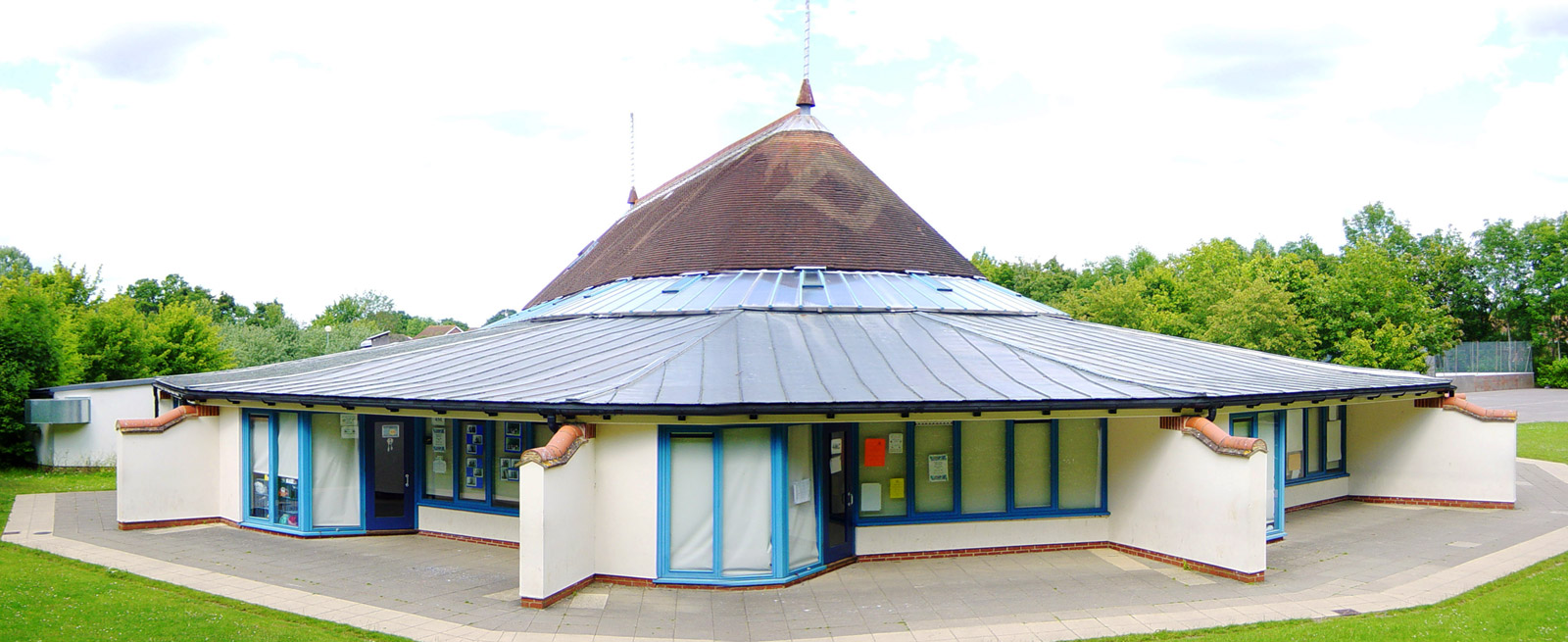
Four Lanes Community Junior School

Chineham today is predominantly a residential area with good road links to Basingstoke, Reading and the M3 motorway. The area is well served with local amenities, including:

- Chineham District Centre, with supermarkets, shops and a public library. Hampshire County Council considered closing the library in 2020 but following public consultation, it was reprieved.
- Four Lanes Community Infant and Junior Schools
- Great Binfields Primary School
- Christ Church (interdenominational), built in 1987 and significantly extended in 2004
- Chineham Medical Practice (local health centre) and two dental practices
- Chineham Village hall, and the Chineham Arms (local pub)
- A regular bus service to Basingstoke town centre
- A local grassroots football team, Chineham Tigers FC, catering for 400 football players from Mens to U5s.
- A local running club, Chineham Park Running Club.

Veolia Environmental Services operates an energy recovery facility (ERF) on the eastern boundary of Chineham. The Integra North ERF, situated on Whitmarsh Lane between the A33 and the River Loddon, incinerates unrecyclable household waste to produce steam and generate electricity which is then supplied to the National Grid. The facility has a power output of 8MW.

Chineham Business Park, an 815,000 sq ft mixed-use development in Basingstoke, is home to over 50 UK and international companies, employing more than 3,500 people across sectors such as technology, communications, and IT.

== Government ==
Chineham is a village, civil parish and part of the Chineham ward of Basingstoke and Deane borough council. The borough council is a Non-metropolitan district of Hampshire County Council.

== Geography ==
The parish boundaries are formed in the north by the limit of the Cufaude Village development; the newer development of Sherfield Park to the north is a separate parish. The parish is bounded on the west by the Reading to Basingstoke railway line, which separates it from Chineham Business Park. It is bordered on the east by the A33. Part of parish lies south of the A33; this section encompasses the Chineham Centre with a southern boundary of Great Binfields Road, which separates it from Lychpit. The civil parishes that border it are Sherfield Park to the north, Sherfield-on-Loddon to the northeast and Old Basing and Lychpit to the southeast.

The Basingstoke and Deane ward of Chineham consists of the parishes of Chineham and Sherfield Park parish and Chineham Business Park.
