= William Carnsew =

16th-century English politician

William Carnsew (by 1497 – 1570), of Bokelly in St. Kew, Cornwall, was an English politician.

He was a Member of Parliament (MP) for Bossiney in 1547. Carnsew wrote about his visits to other important houses in Cornwall.
