= Cindery Island =

Island on the east coast of England

Coordinates: 51°48′13″N 1°01′58″E

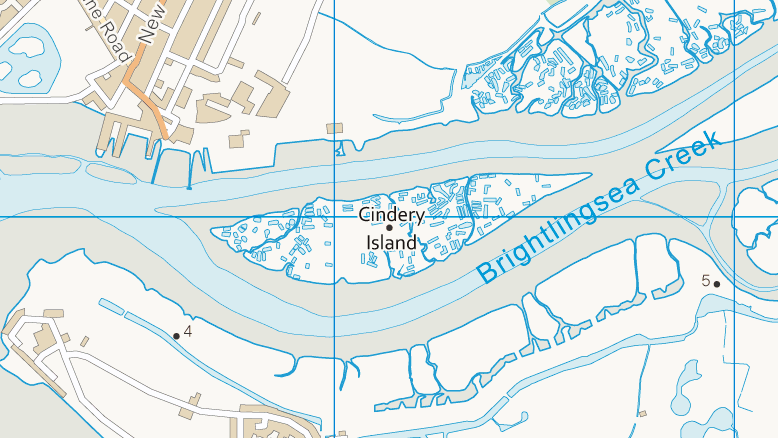
Map of Cindery Island

Cindery Island is at the mouth of Brightlingsea Creek (off the town of Brightlingsea) on the east coast of England in the county of Essex.
