= Chyanvounder =

Hamlet in Gunwalloe, Cornwall, England

Coordinates: 50.056°N 5.27°W

Chyanvounder: Cornish: Chi an Vownder
- Location within Cornwall
- OS grid reference: SW657224
- Civil parish: Gunwalloe
- Unitary authority: Cornwall
- Ceremonial county: Cornwall
- Region: South West
- Country: England
- Sovereign state: United Kingdom
- Post town: HELSTON
- Postcode district: TR13
- Dialling code: 01326
- Police: Devon and Cornwall
- Fire: Cornwall
- Ambulance: South Western
- UK Parliament: St Ives

Chyanvounder (Cornish: Chi an Vownder, meaning house of the lane) is a hamlet in the parish of Gunwalloe, Cornwall, England. Chyanvounder is situated 3.4 miles (5.5 km) south of Helston on the Lizard Peninsula.

Chyanvounder lies within the Cornwall Area of Outstanding Natural Beauty (AONB). Almost a third of Cornwall has AONB designation, with the same status and protection as a National Park.

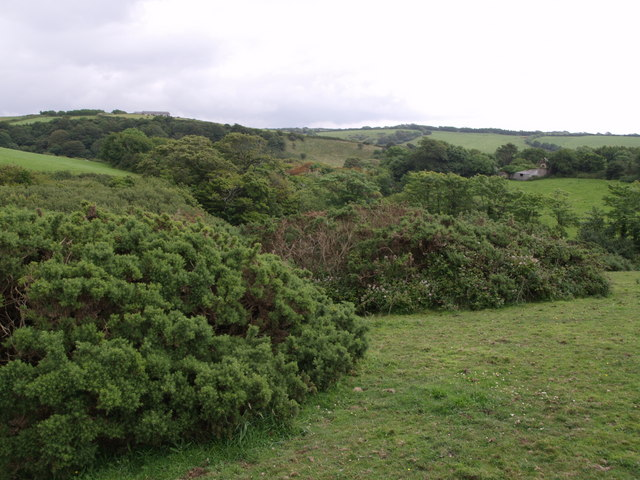
Landscape east of Chyanvounder

== Cornish wrestling ==
Cornish wrestling tournaments for prizes were held in a field, adjoining the Ship Inn, which has become the Halzephron Inn, in Chyanvounder.
