= Chyvarloe =

Hamlet in Gunwalloe, Cornwall, England

Coordinates: 50.064°N 5.28°W

- Location within Cornwall
- OS grid reference: SW654234
- Civil parish: Gunwalloe
- Unitary authority: Cornwall
- Ceremonial county: Cornwall
- Region: South West
- Country: England
- Sovereign state: United Kingdom
- Post town: HELSTON
- Postcode district: TR13
- Dialling code: 01326
- Police: Devon and Cornwall
- Fire: Cornwall
- Ambulance: South Western
- UK Parliament: St Ives

Chyvarloe is a hamlet in the parish of Gunwalloe, Cornwall, England. Chyvarloe is situated 3 miles (4.8 km) south-west of Helston on the Lizard Peninsula.

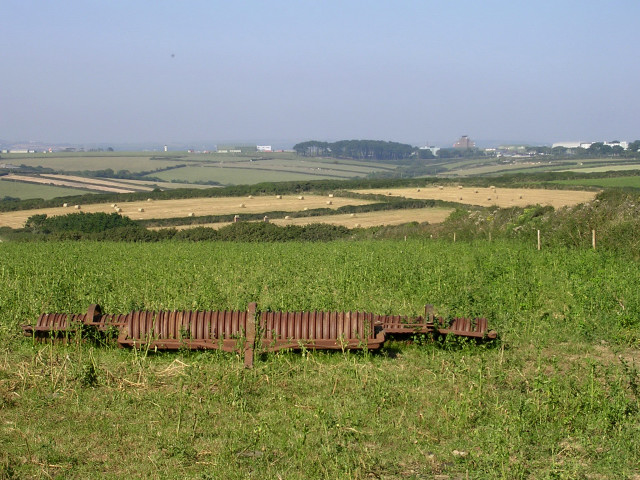
Fields north of Chyvarloe
