= Edwin Dockree =

British architectural photographer

Edwin Dockree (1860–1942) was a British architectural photographer. His images are of English architecture and feature religious and secular buildings as well as villages and landscapes.

== Biography ==
Edwin Dockree was born in Islington, London on 24 May 1860. He was the first child of the better known landscape artist, Mark Edwin Dockree (1834–1904) and Ann Elizabeth Blagg (1835–1914). Dockree senior's paintings can be found on a number of auction house websites and letters written by him are held by The Royal Academy of Arts .

On leaving school Dockree pursued a career in banking, later becoming a bank manager.

Dockree married Martha Dorothy Whitaker (1861–1938) in 1887 at Fulham Registry Office. Their son, Eric Percy Dockree, was born on 24 May 1890.

Alongside his daily work and family responsibilities, Dockree developed an interest in photography and images taken by him appear in photographic archives and in print.

== Photographic legacy ==
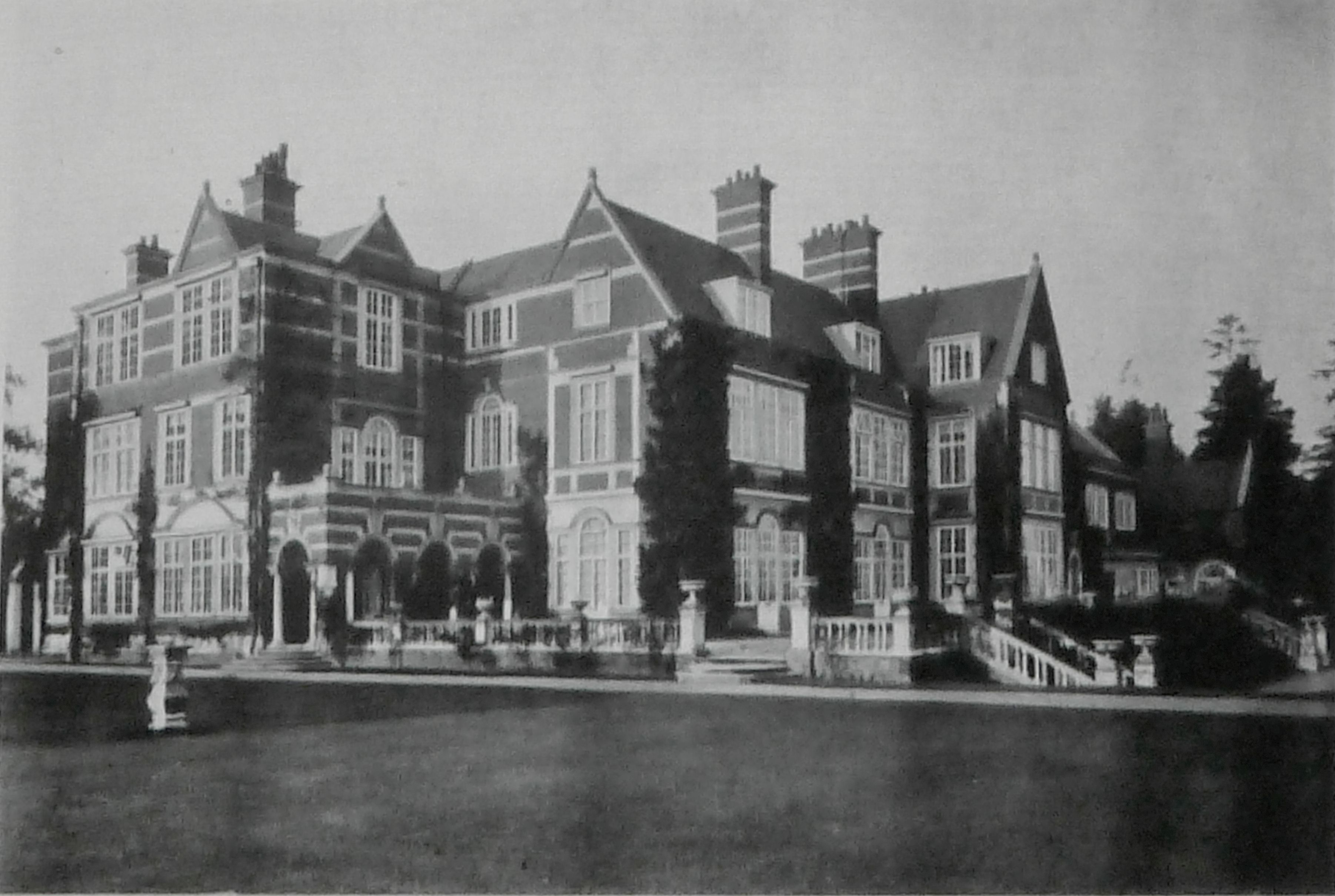
Sherfield Manor (1908) by Edwin Dockree

Dockree became a member of the Royal Photographic Society in 1887 and he exhibited his photographs at annual exhibitions of the Society.

A collection of Dockree's photographs are held at Historic England where he is described as an Architectural Photographer. The archive contains 145 glass plate negatives thought to date from 1900 to 1940. The images are of buildings from across England including churches, cathedrals, houses, villages, castles and landscapes. The images have been digitised and appear on the Historic England website.

The Conway Library at The Courtauld Institute of Art, an independent college of the University of London, holds a number of images attributed to Edwin Dockree.

== Bibliography ==
In addition to the collections cited above, Dockree's images appear in A E Richardson's 'Monumental Classical Architecture of Great Britain and Ireland during the Eighteenth and Nineteenth Centuries'. A reference to Richardson's book appears in the Journal of the Royal Institute of British Architects, Vol. XXI, Third Series, Nov. 1913 – Oct 1914, where Edwin is credited as follows, "...illustrated in a series of Photographs taken by E Dockree."
