= Church Coombe =

Coordinates: 50.220°N 5.237°W

Church Combe: Cornish: Komm Eglos
- Location within Cornwall
- OS grid reference: SW692406
- Shire county: Cornwall
- Region: South West
- Country: England
- Sovereign state: United Kingdom
- Post town: REDRUTH
- Postcode district: TR16
- Dialling code: 01209
- Police: Devon and Cornwall
- Fire: Cornwall
- Ambulance: South Western
- UK Parliament: Camborne and Redruth

Church Coombe (Cornish: Komm Eglos) is a hamlet in the parish of Redruth, Cornwall, England. It is situated 1 mile (1.6 km) south-west of Redruth and lies in the Cornwall and West Devon Mining Landscape which was designated as a World Heritage Site in 2006. It is in the civil parish of Carn Brea.

Church Coombe lies just to the east of the Neolithic hilltop enclosure at Carn Brea, which is an ancient monument listed by English Heritage.
