= Sheffield Park (Charlotte, North Carolina) =

Park in North Carolina, US

Sheffield Neighborhood Park
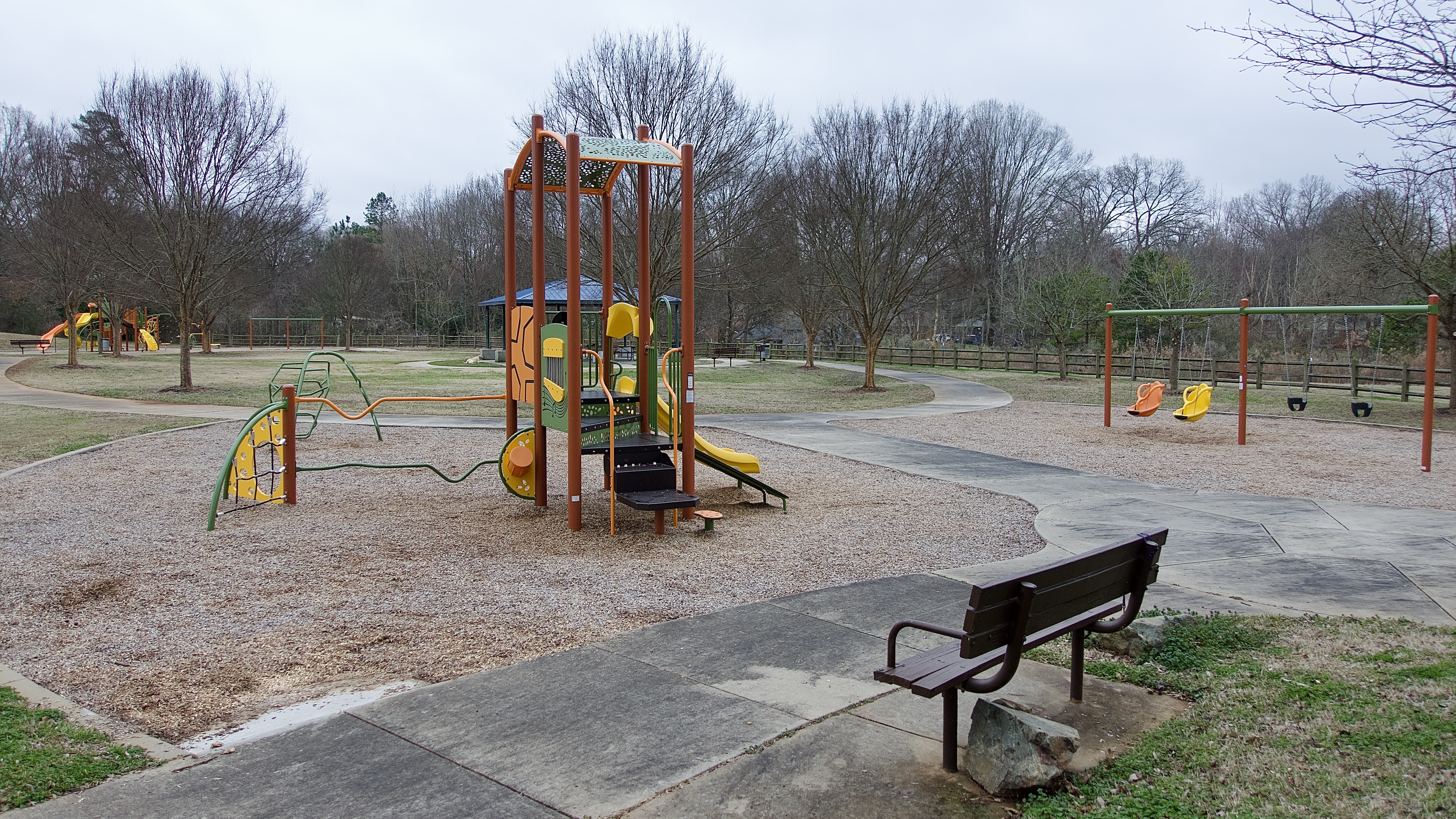
- Interactive map of Sheffield Neighborhood Park
- Type: Public Neighborhood Park
- Location: Charlotte, North Carolina
- Coordinates: 35.2060°N 80.7692°W
- Area: 8 acres (3.2 ha)
- Operator: Mecklenburg County Parks and Recreation
- Website: Sheffield Park

Sheffield Park is an 8-acre urban park at 1300 Tarrington Avenue in the 1950's-early 1960's era established Neighborhood of Eastway Park/Sheffield Park Neighborhood of Charlotte, North Carolina. It features a playground, a picnic shelter, and one court for each of tennis and basketball.

Sheffield Park is adjacent to Evergreen Cemetery, and Evergreen Nature Preserve. Together these three parcels of Mecklenburg County and City of Charlotte owned land provide over 100 acres of woodlands within minutes of uptown Charlotte.

== Evergreen Nature Preserve ==
In 2008 Mecklenburg County voters approved a $250 million bond to improve and expand parks. One result was construction of a 77-acre urban forest to be known as Evergreen Nature Preserve. It is named after the adjacent Evergreen Cemetery on Central Avenue. The preserve contains a variety of habitats and attracts many migratory birds during the fall and spring. Mecklenburg County Park and Rec holds occasional festivals celebrating migratory birds at Evergreen. For example, in cooperation with Reedy Creek Nature Preserve, May 1, 2010 was declared International Migratory Birds Day at the Evergreen Nature Preserve.

Evergreen Nature Preserve is directly adjacent to Sheffield Neighborhood Park with entrances available by foot from Tarrington Avenue to dedicated trails and also from the other side at the Norland Road entrance that includes a dedicated, small parking lot which has a small outdoor covered shelter with easy, dedicated, clearly marked walking Trails for Visitors.
