= Kirktown of St Fergus =

Village in Scotland

Coordinates: 57°33′30″N 1°50′50.1″W

Kirktown of St Fergus, often just called Kirktown, is an area of the village of St Fergus in Buchan, Aberdeenshire, Scotland. It should not be confused with an area of Peterhead.
