= Chippenhall Green =

UK Site of Special Scientific Interest

Coordinates: 52.333°N 1.355°E

- Site of Special Scientific Interest
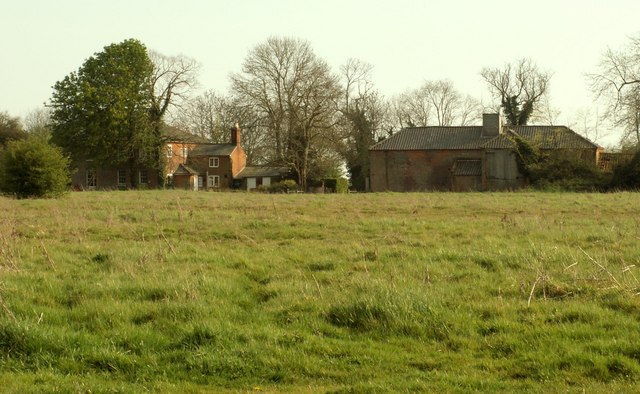
- Location of Chippenhall Green.
- Area of search: Suffolk
- Grid reference: TM 287 758
- Interest: Biological
- Area: 16.3 hectares
- Notification date: 1986
- Location map: Magic Map

Chippenhall Green is a 16.3-hectare (40-acre) biological Site of Special Scientific Interest west of Halesworth in Suffolk, England.

This unimproved grassland on calcareous clay soil has grasses including meadow foxtail, sweet vernal grass and red fescue. Diverse flowering plants include cuckoo flowers and a large population of green-winged orchids.

There is access from roads which go through the site.
