= Sherfield Park =

Civil parish in Hampshire, England

Coordinates: 51.301072°N 1.044608°W

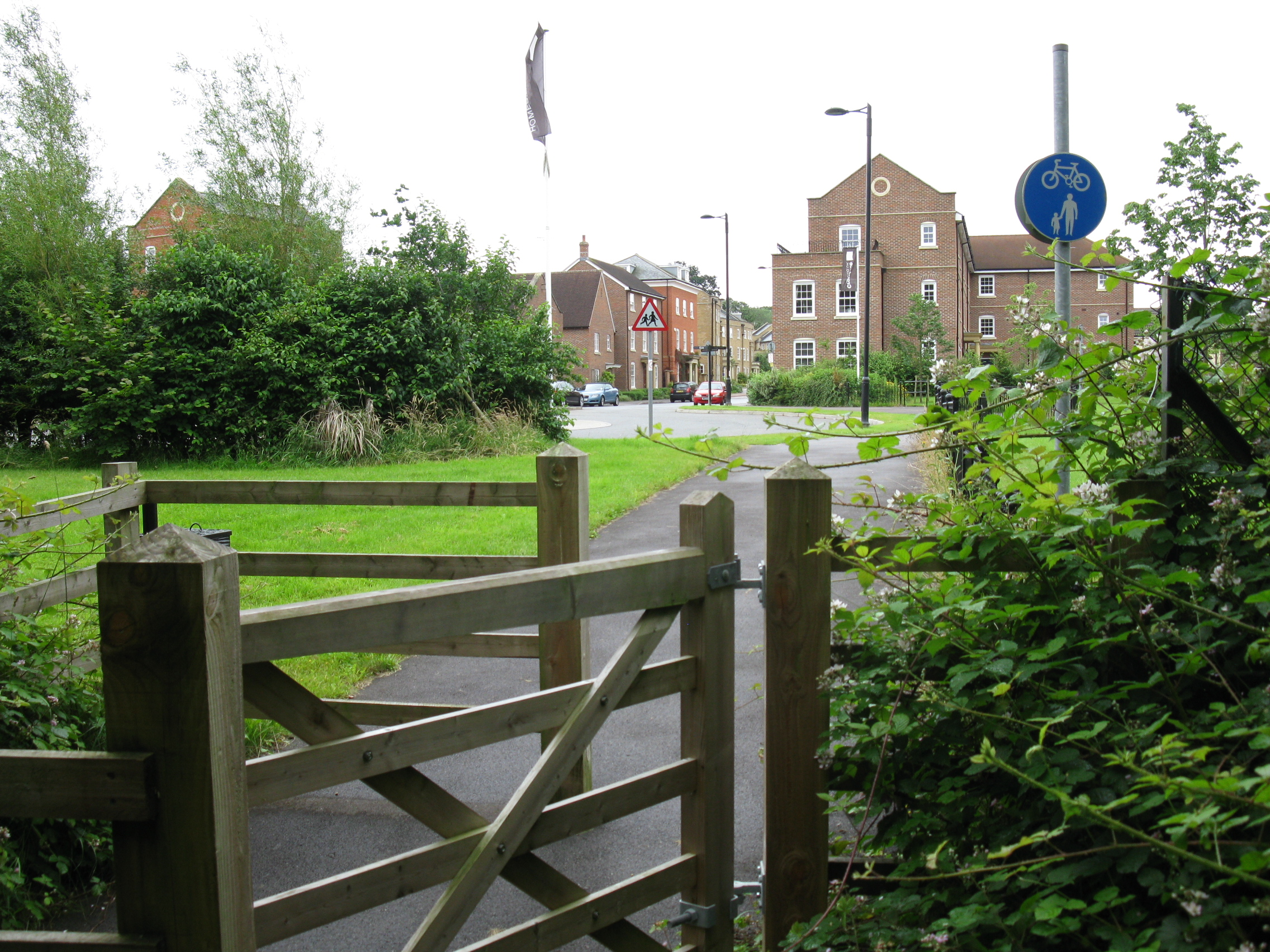
- Path to the housing estate

- Location within Hampshire
  - London: 42.8 miles (69 km) SW
- District: Basingstoke and Deane
- Shire county: Hampshire
- Region: South East
- Country: England
- Sovereign state: United Kingdom
- Post town: HOOK
- Postcode district: RG27
- Dialling code: 01256
- Police: Hampshire and Isle of Wight
- Fire: Hampshire and Isle of Wight
- Ambulance: South Central
- UK Parliament: Basingstoke

Sherfield Park, also known as Taylor's Farm, is a civil parish in the Basingstoke and Deane district of Hampshire, England. It is situated about 4 miles (6 km) northeast of central Basingstoke, to the west of the A33 road that runs between Basingstoke and Reading.

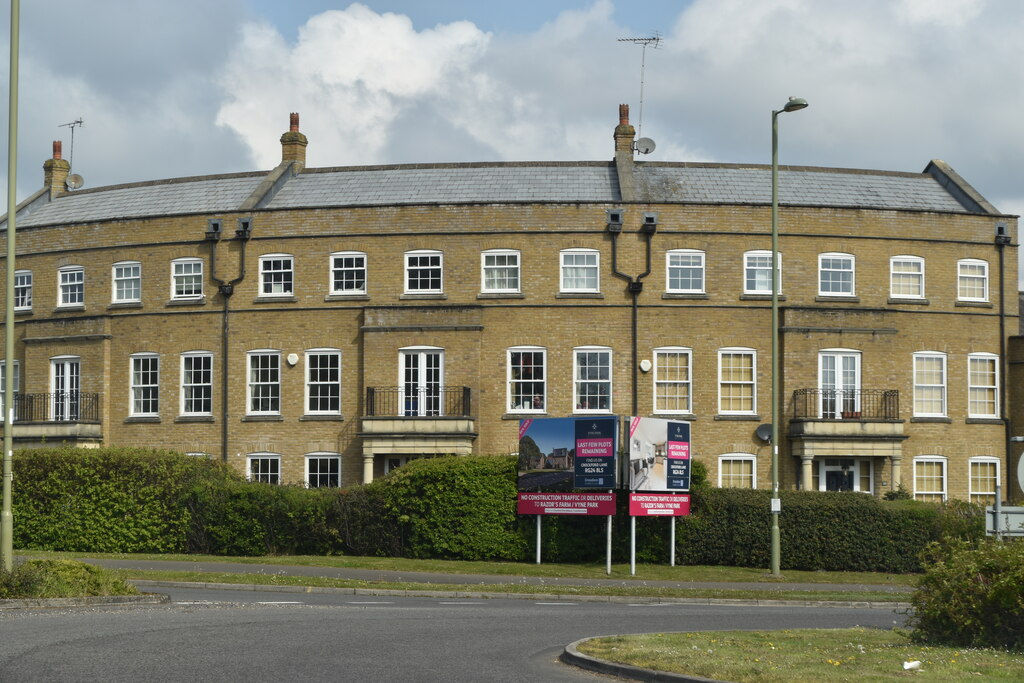
Crescent at Taylor's Farm Roundabout

The civil parish covers a housing estate that was built between 2004 and 2014 and now has 1,000 dwellings. The greenfield site had until then mainly been part of Taylor's Farm, a name which has sometimes been used for the estate. The estate was originally part of the parish of Sherfield on Loddon. Between 2008 and 2016, the area was a ward of this parish which was named Taylor's Farm.

== History ==
The development was opened by the Minister for Housing and Planning Keith Hill in March 2004.

Councillors on Basingstoke and Deane Borough Council voted to create a separate Sherfield Park Parish Council on 26 March 2015 with 85% of councillors in favour. On 1 April 2016, Sherfield Park was separated to form a parish of its own, with its first parish council being elected a month later. Sherfield Park is in the borough electoral ward of Chineham and the county council division of Loddon.
