= Church Town, Cornwall =

Hamlet in Redruth, Cornwall, England

Coordinates: 50.226°N 5.237°W

Church Town: Cornish: Treveglos
- Location within Cornwall
- OS grid reference: SW692412
- Civil parish: Redruth
- Unitary authority: Cornwall
- Ceremonial county: Cornwall
- Region: South West
- Country: England
- Sovereign state: United Kingdom
- Post town: Redruth
- Postcode district: TR
- Police: Devon and Cornwall
- Fire: Cornwall
- Ambulance: South Western

Church Town (Cornish: Treveglos) is a hamlet in the parish of Redruth, Cornwall, England.
