= Churchtown, Cornwall =

In Cornwall, the churchtown (Cornish: Treneglos) is the settlement in a parish where the church stands, for example,

- Churchtown Mullion
- Churchtown Redruth
- Churchtown St Hilary
- Churchtown St Merryn
- Churchtown St Minver
- Gorran Churchtown
- Gulval Churchtown
- Illogan Churchtown
- Ludgvan Churchtown
- Mylor Churchtown
- St Breward Churchtown
- St Kew Churchtown
- St Levan Churchtown
- St Stephen Churchtown
- Zennor Churchtown

The Cornish for "churchtown" is Treneglos, although only one settlement kept the Cornish name, the rest converting to the English, or not being a settlement before English overtook Cornish and became the main language of that part of Cornwall. The churchtown will not necessarily be the main settlement in the parish.
