= Church Green, Devon =

Hamlet in Devon, England

Coordinates: 50.766667°N 3.166666°W

Church Green
- Location within Devon
- OS grid reference: SY1782196991
- Shire county: Devon
- Region: South West
- Country: England
- Sovereign state: United Kingdom
- Post town: HONITON
- Postcode district: EX24 6E
- Dialling code: 01297
- Police: Devon and Cornwall
- Fire: Devon and Somerset
- Ambulance: South Western
- UK Parliament: Honiton and Sidmouth

Church Green is a hamlet in the civil parish of Farway in the East Devon district of Devon, England. Its nearest town is Honiton, which lies approximately 2.9 miles (4.7 km) north from the hamlet.
