= Sherfield on Loddon =

Village and parish in Hampshire, England

Coordinates: 51.3170°N 1.0253°W

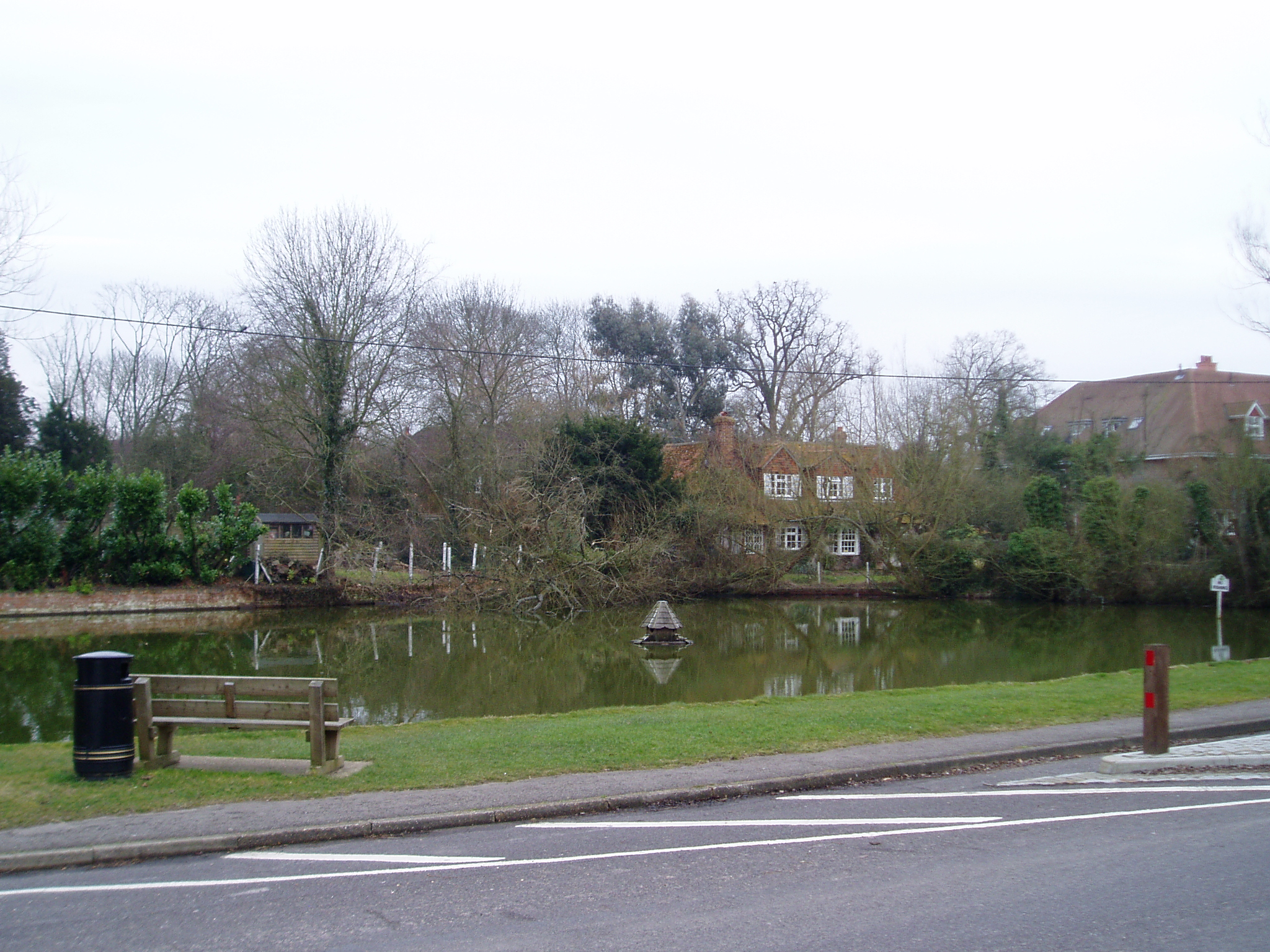
- The village duck pond

- Location within Hampshire
- Population: 1,636 (Census, 2001); 3,107 (2011 Census)
- OS grid reference: SU680580
- District: Basingstoke and Deane
- Shire county: Hampshire
- Region: South East
- Country: England
- Sovereign state: United Kingdom
- Post town: HOOK
- Postcode district: RG27
- Dialling code: 01256
- Police: Hampshire and Isle of Wight
- Fire: Hampshire and Isle of Wight
- Ambulance: South Central
- UK Parliament: North East Hampshire

Sherfield on Loddon—formerly Sherfield upon Loddon—is a village and civil parish in the English county of Hampshire. It is located at grid reference SU680580, approximately 12 miles (19 km) south of Reading and 6 miles (10 km) north of Basingstoke.

At the 2001 census it had a population of 1,594. This had increased to 1,644 at the 2011 Census, with a further 1,463 assigned to the Sherfield Park development on the edge of Basingstoke, prior to it being separated to form a parish of its own in 2016.

== Descent of the manor ==
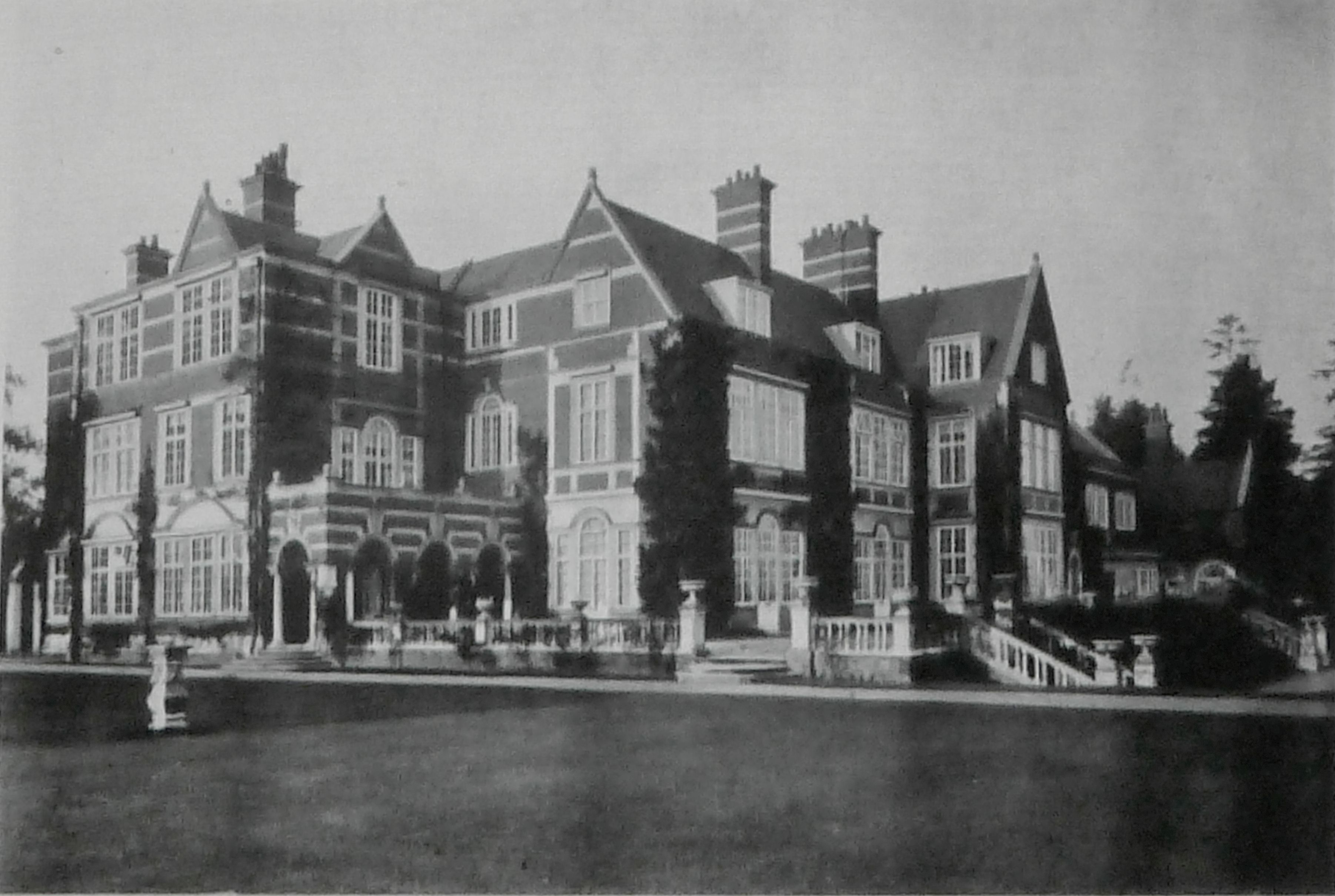
Sherfield Manor (1908) by Edwin Dockree

Sherfield on Loddon originally formed part of the Manor of Odiham, and did not, therefore, appear in the Domesday Book.

=== FitzAldelin ===
Odiham continued to be held by the king, until around 1167–68, the manor was granted by Henry II to William Fitz Aldelin, on the occasion of his marriage to Juliane, the daughter of Robert Dorsnell. He is reputed to have built the original Manor House.

=== Warblington ===
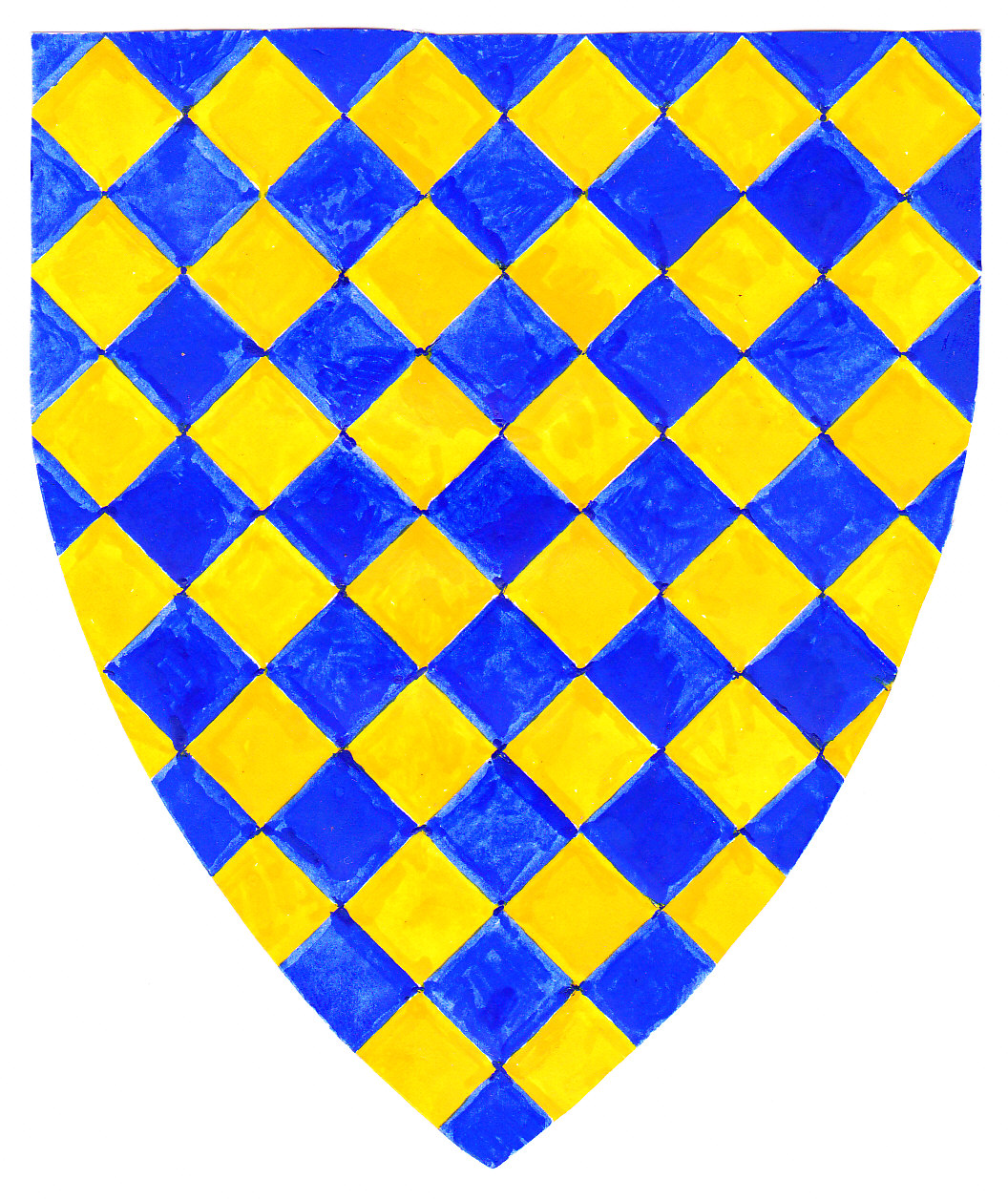
Armorials of Warblington: Lozengy or and azure. These arms were the subject of a famous legal dispute in 1347 with Theobald Gorges, see Warbelton v. Gorges

Juliane outlived her husband, and after she died, her estate was split up in 1205, when William de Warblington inherited the manor. Sherfield was held in the reign of Edward I (1272-1307) by Thomas de Warblington, High Sheriff of Hampshire, tenant-in-chief from the king in serjeanty by the services providing laundresses, of dismembering malefactors and measuring the gallons and bushels in the royal household.

=== Puttenham ===
The manor passed by marriage from the Warblingtons to the Puttenham family. The reputed 1589 author of The Arte of English Poesie, George Puttenham, grew up at Sherfield Court but, as an adult, disputed its ownership with his niece.

=== Wellesley ===
The Manor was eventually purchased by the Duke of Wellington in 1838.

== Modern day ==
The present village developed about one mile north of the Manor house and church from around the 14th century. By the start of the twentieth century there were about forty homes surrounding the main village green with more homes around the Manor and Church.

In 1917 Bramley Ordnance Depot opened to the southwest of the Village. The first stocks of ammunition began arriving in January 1918, and from 1922 to 1974 it was the home of the Royal Army Ordnance Corps School of Ammunition. It ceased to be used as an ammunition depot in 1987, and is now known as the Bramley Training Area. It created employment opportunities for both Sherfield on Loddon and Bramley.

A bypass was built around the village in 1974, moving the main Reading to Basingstoke road to the east.

From 2004 to 2014, the Sherfield Park development was built on the edge of Basingstoke within the boundaries of the civil parish. By the time it was completed, the new development's population outnumbered that of the original village. In 2016, Sherfield Park was separated to become a civil parish of its own.

== Geography ==
Sherfield is located 12 miles (19 km) south of the large town of Reading and 6 miles (10 km) north of Basingstoke. The village is on the A33 road, between Reading and Basingstoke. The parish includes the hamlets of Church End and Wildmoor.

== Schools ==
- Sherfield School
- The Loddon School
- North Foreland Lodge (1947–2003)
