= Keep =

Fortified tower built in the Middle Ages

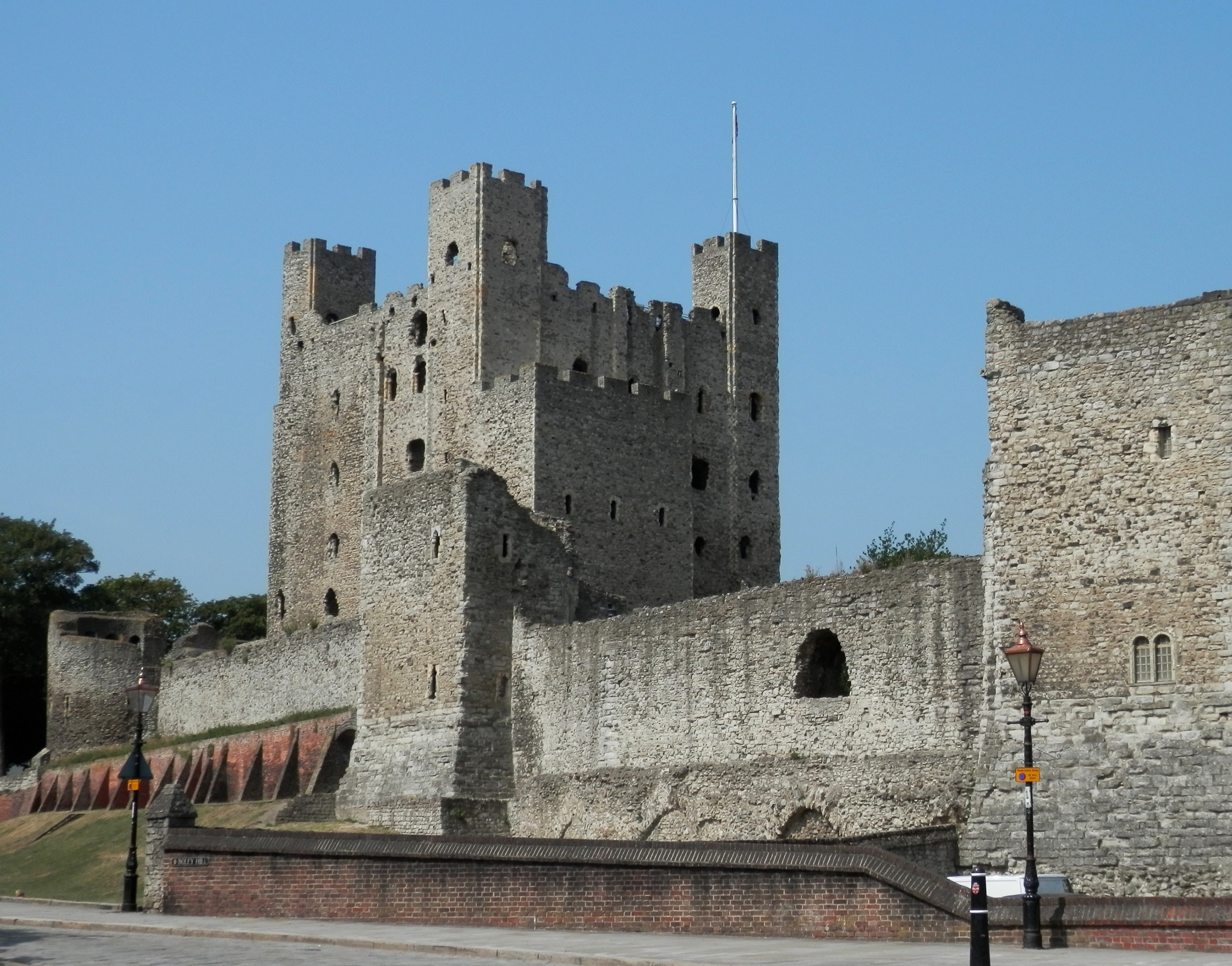
The Norman (c. 1126) keep of Rochester Castle, England (rear). The shorter rectangular tower attached to the keep is its forebuilding, and the curtain wall is in the foreground.

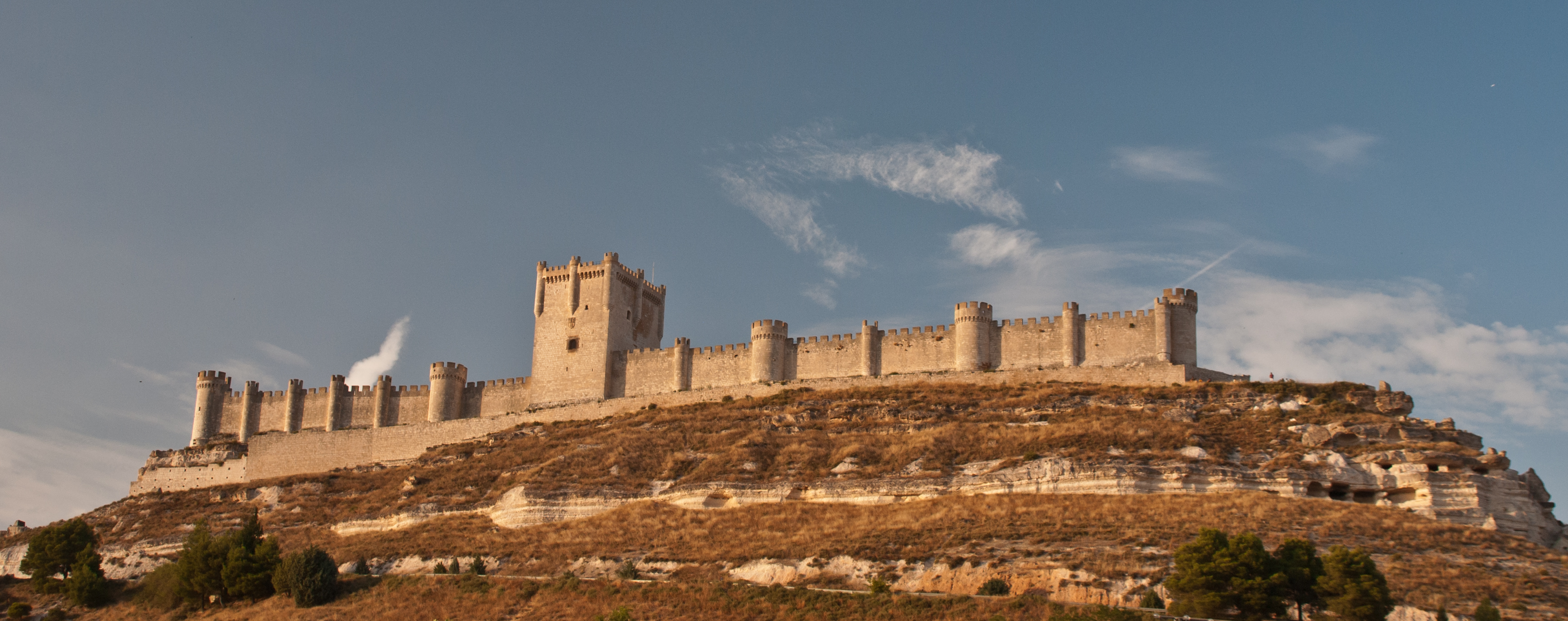
Peñafiel Castle, Spain

A keep is a type of fortified tower built within castles during the Middle Ages by European nobility. Scholars have debated the scope of the word keep, but usually consider it to refer to large towers in castles that were fortified residences, used as a refuge of last resort should the rest of the castle fall to an adversary. The first keeps were made of timber and formed a key part of the motte-and-bailey castles that emerged in Normandy and Anjou during the 10th century; the design spread to England, Portugal, and Southern Italy and Sicily. As a result of the Norman Conquest of England in 1066, use spread into Wales during the second half of the 11th century and into Ireland in the 1170s. The Anglo-Normans and French rulers began to build stone keeps during the 10th and 11th centuries, including Norman keeps, with a square or rectangular design, and circular shell keeps. Stone keeps carried considerable political as well as military importance and could take a decade or more to build.

During the 12th century, new designs began to be introduced – in France, quatrefoil-shaped keeps were introduced, while in England polygonal towers were built. By the end of the century, French and English keep designs began to diverge: Philip II of France built a sequence of circular keeps as part of his bid to stamp his royal authority on his new territories, while in England castles were built without keeps. In Spain, keeps were increasingly incorporated into both Christian and Islamic castles, although in Germany tall fighting towers called bergfriede were preferred to keeps in the western fashion. In the second half of the 14th century, there was a resurgence in the building of keeps. In France, the keep at Vincennes near Paris began a fashion for tall, heavily machicolated fortifications that allowed defenders to target enemies directly below, a trend adopted in Spain most prominently through the Valladolid school of castle design (es:). Meanwhile, tower keeps in England became popular amongst the most wealthy nobles: these large keeps, each uniquely designed, formed part of the grandest castles built during the period.

In the 15th century, the protective function of keeps was compromised by improved artillery. For example, in 1464 during the Wars of the Roses, the keep of Bamburgh Castle on the Northumberland coast, previously considered to be impregnable, was defeated with bombards, an early canon. By the 16th century, keeps were slowly falling out of fashion as fortifications and residences. Many were destroyed in civil wars between the 17th and 18th centuries or incorporated into gardens as an alternative to follies. During the 19th century, keeps became fashionable once again, and in England and France, a number were restored or redesigned by Gothic architects. Despite further damage to many French and Spanish keeps during the wars of the 20th century, keeps now form an important part of the tourist and heritage industry in Europe.

== Etymology and historiography ==
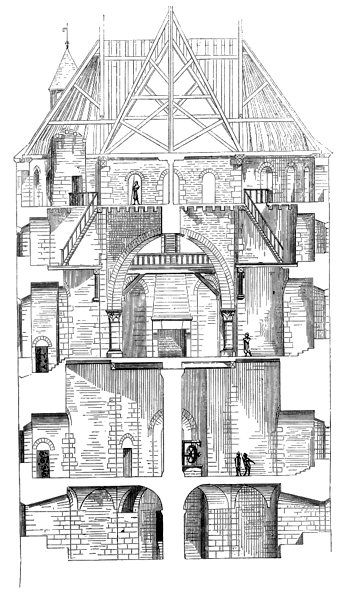
A 19th-century reconstruction drawing of the keep at Château d'Étampes in France

Since the 16th century, the English word keep has commonly referred to large towers in castles. The word originates from around 1375 to 1376, coming from the Middle English term kype, meaning basket or cask, and was a term applied to the shell keep at Guînes, said to resemble a barrel. The term came to be used for other shell keeps by the 15th century. By the 17th century, the word keep lost its original reference to baskets or casks and was popularly assumed to have come from the Middle English word keep, meaning to hold or to protect.

Early on, the use of the word keep became associated with the idea of a tower in a castle that would serve both as a fortified, high-status private residence and a refuge of last resort. The issue was complicated by the building of fortified Renaissance towers in Italy called tenazza that were used as defences of last resort and were also named after the Italian for to hold or to keep. By the 19th century, Victorian historians incorrectly concluded that the etymology of the words "keep" and tenazza were linked and that all keeps had fulfilled this military function.

As a result of this evolution in meaning, the use of the term keep in historical analysis today can be problematic. Contemporary medieval writers used various terms for the buildings we would today call keeps. In Latin, they are variously described as turris, turris castri or magna turris – a tower, a castle tower, or a great tower. The 12th-century French came to term them a donjon, from the Latin dominarium "lordship", an agent noun linking the physical structure with the concept of feudal authority. Similarly, medieval Spanish writers called the buildings torre del homenaje, or "tower of homage". In England, donjon turned into dungeon, which initially referred to a keep, rather than to a place of imprisonment.

While the term remains in common academic use, some academics prefer to use the term donjon, and most modern historians warn against using the term "keep" simplistically. The fortifications that we would today call keeps did not necessarily form part of a unified medieval style, nor were they all used in a similar fashion during the period.

== History ==
=== Timber keeps (9th–12th centuries) ===
The earliest keeps were built as part of motte-and-bailey castles from the 10th century onwards – a combination of documentary and archaeological evidence places the first such castle, built at Vincy, in 979. These castles were initially built by the more powerful lords of Anjou in the late 10th and 11th centuries, in particular Fulk III and his son, Geoffrey II, who built a great number of them between 987 and 1060. William the Conqueror then introduced this form of castle into England when he invaded in 1066, and the design spread through south Wales as the Normans expanded up the valleys during the subsequent decades.

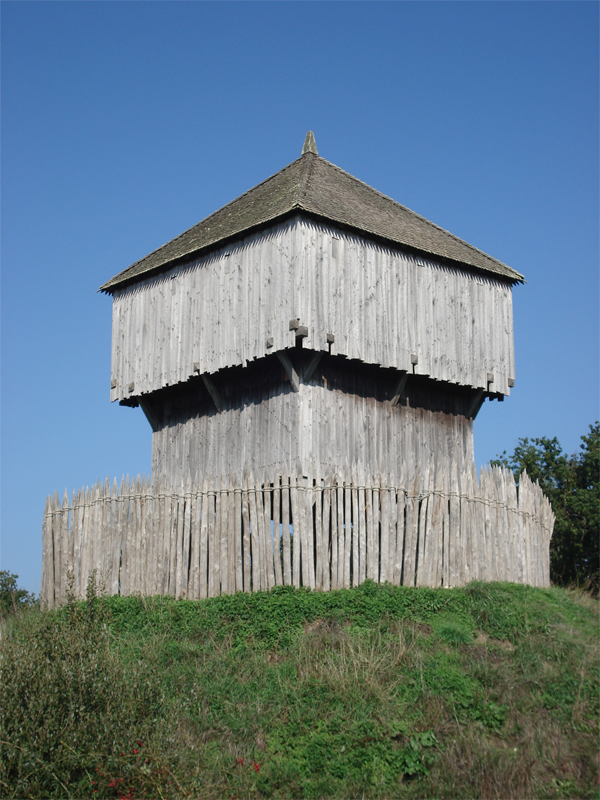
Reconstructed keep at Saint-Sylvain-d'Anjou in Maine-et-Loire

In a motte-and-bailey design, a castle would include a mound called a motte, usually artificially constructed by piling up turf and soil, and a bailey, a lower walled enclosure. A keep and a protective wall would usually be built on top of the motte. Some protective walls around a keep would be large enough to have a wall-walk around them, and the outer walls of the motte and the wall-walk could be strengthened by filling in the gap between the wooden walls with earth and stones, allowing it to carry more weight – this was called a garillum. Smaller mottes could only support simple towers with room for a few soldiers, whilst larger mottes could be equipped with a much grander keep. Many wooden keeps were designed with a bretasche, a square structure that overhung from the upper floors of the building, enabling better defences and a more sturdy structural design. These wooden keeps could be protected by skins and hides to prevent them from being easily set alight during a siege.

One contemporary account of these keeps comes from Jean de Colmieu around 1130, who described how the nobles of the Calais region would build "a mound of earth as high as they can and dig a ditch about it as wide and deep as possible. The space on top of the mound is enclosed by a palisade of very strong hewn logs, strengthened at intervals by as many towers as their means can provide. Inside the enclosure is a citadel, or keep, which commands the whole circuit of the defences. The entrance to the fortress is by means of a bridge, which, rising from the outer side of the moat and supported on posts as it ascends, reches to the top of the mound." At Durham Castle, contemporaries described how the keep arose from the "tumulus of rising earth" with a keep reaching "into thin air, strong within and without", a "stalwart house...glittering with beauty in every part". As well as having defensive value, keeps and mottes sent a powerful political message to the local population.

Wooden keeps could be quite extensive in size and, as Robert Higham and Philip Barker have noted, it was possible to build "...very tall and massive structures." (Note: The timber structure of surviving medieval bell towers have provided archaeologists with indications of at least some of the architectural techniques available at the time.) As an example of what these keeps may have comprised, the early 12th-century chronicler Lambert of Ardres described the wooden keep on top of the motte at the castle of Ardres, where the "...first storey was on the surface of the ground, where were cellars and granaries, and great boxes, tuns, casks, and other domestic utensils. In the storey above were the dwelling and common living-rooms of the residents in which were the larders, the rooms of the bakers and butlers, and the great chamber in which the lord and his wife slept...In the upper storey of the house were garret rooms...In this storey also the watchmen and the servants appointed to keep the house took their sleep."

In the Holy Roman Empire, tall, free-standing, wooden (later stone), fighting towers called Bergfriede were commonly built by the 11th century, either as part of motte-and-bailey designs or, as part of Hohenburgen castles, with characteristic inner and outer courts. Bergfriede, which take their name from the German for a belfry, had similarities to keeps, but are usually distinguished from them on account of Bergfriede having a smaller area or footprint, usually being non-residential and being typically integrated into the outer defences of a castle, rather than being a safe refuge of last resort. (Note: In practice, smaller keeps are often hard to distinguish from the design of a Bergfried – it is also worth bearing in mind the lack of clarity of the term keep when drawing distinctions of this kind.)

=== Early stone keeps (10th–12th centuries) ===
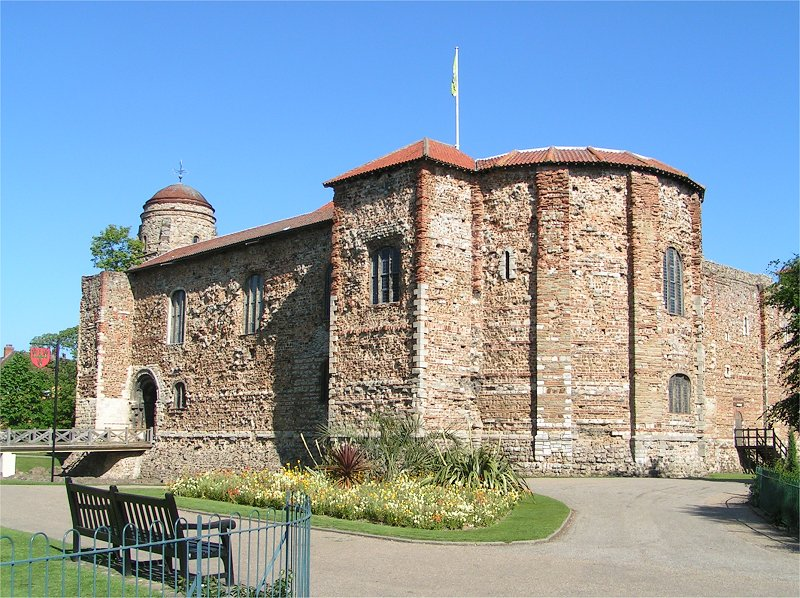
The Norman keep at Colchester Castle in Essex, built in a Romanesque style on the foundations of a Roman temple

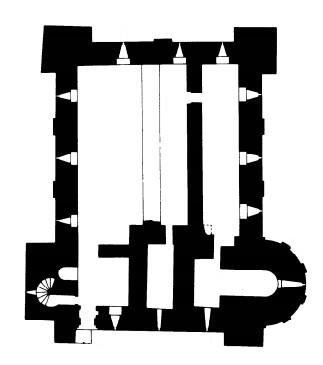

During the 10th century, a small number of stone keeps began to be built in France, such at the Château de Langeais: in the 11th century, their numbers increased as the style spread through Normandy across the rest of France and into England, South Italy and Sicily. Some existing motte-and-bailey castles were converted to stone, with the keep usually amongst the first parts to be upgraded, while in other cases new keeps were built from scratch in stone. In some cases the keep and motte were built at the same time with the keep embedded in the motte, as happened at Ascot d'Oilly Castle, while at other castles, such as Lydford and Wareham in England, mottes were a later feature and built around a keep. Starting the construction of the keep at ground level and building the motte around it gave the building greater stability.

Stone keeps were introduced into Ireland during the 1170s following the Norman occupation of the east of the country, where they were particularly popular amongst the new Anglo-Norman lords. Two broad types of design emerged across France and England during the period: four-sided stone keeps, known as Norman keeps or great keeps in English – a donjon carré or donjon roman in French – and circular shell keeps. (Note: Although medieval writers typically referred to Norman keeps as a magna turris, or great tower, there was no specific contemporary term for a shell keep.)

The reasons for the transition from timber to stone keeps are unclear, and the process was slow and uneven, taking many years to take effect across the various regions. Traditionally it was believed that stone keeps had been adopted because of the cruder nature of wooden buildings, the limited lifespan of wooden fortifications and their vulnerability to fire, but recent archaeological studies have shown that many wooden castles were as robust and as sophisticated as their stone equivalents. Some wooden keeps were not converted into stone for many years and were instead expanded in wood, such as at Hen Domen. Nonetheless, stone became increasingly popular as a building material for keeps for both military and symbolic reasons.

Stone keep construction required skilled craftsmen. Unlike timber and earthworks, which could be built using unfree labour or serfs, these craftsmen had to be paid and stone keeps were therefore expensive. They were also relatively slow to erect, due to the limitations of the lime mortar used during the period – a keep's walls could usually be raised by a maximum of only 12 feet (3.6 metres) a year; the keep at Scarborough was not atypical in taking ten years to build. The number of such keeps remained relatively low: in England, for example, although several early stone keeps had been built after the conquest, there were only somewhere between ten and fifteen in existence by 1100, and only around a hundred had been built by 1216.

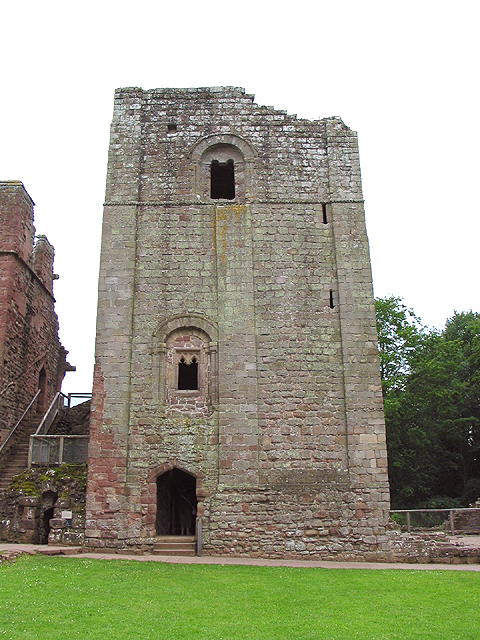

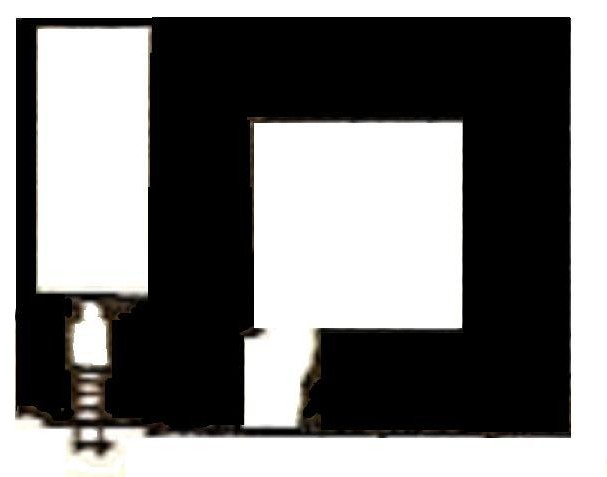
The Norman keep (r) and prison (l) at Goodrich Castle in Herefordshire, England, built to a square design in the early 12th century

Norman keeps had four sides, with the corners reinforced by pilaster buttresses; some keeps, particularly in Normandy and France, had a barlongue design, being rectangular in plan with their length twice their width, while others, particularly in England, formed a square. These keeps could be up to four storeys high, with the entrance placed on the first storey to prevent the door from being easily broken down; early French keeps had external stairs in wood, whilst later castles in both France and England built them in stone. In some cases the entrance stairs were protected by additional walls and a door, producing a forebuilding. The strength of the Norman design typically came from the thickness of the keep's walls: usually made of rag-stone, these could be up to 24 feet (7.3 metres) thick, immensely strong, and producing a steady temperature inside the building throughout summer and winter. The larger keeps were subdivided by an internal wall while the smaller versions had a single, slightly cramped chamber on each floor. Usually only the first floor would be vaulted in stone, with the higher storeys supported with timbers.

There has been extensive academic discussion of the extent to which Norman keeps were designed with a military or political function in mind, particularly in England. Earlier analyses of Norman keeps focused on their military design, and historians such as R. Brown Cathcart King proposed that square keeps were adopted because of their military superiority over timber keeps. Most of these Norman keeps were certainly extremely physically robust, even though the characteristic pilaster buttresses added little real architectural strength to the design. Many of the weaknesses inherent to their design were irrelevant during the early part of their history. The corners of square keeps were theoretically vulnerable to siege engines and galleried mining, but before the introduction of the trebuchet at the end of the 12th century, early artillery stood little practical chance of damaging the keeps, and galleried mining was rarely practised. Similarly, the corners of a square keep created dead space that defenders could not fire at, but missile fire in castle sieges was less important until the introduction of the crossbow in the middle of the 12th century, when arrowslits began to be introduced.

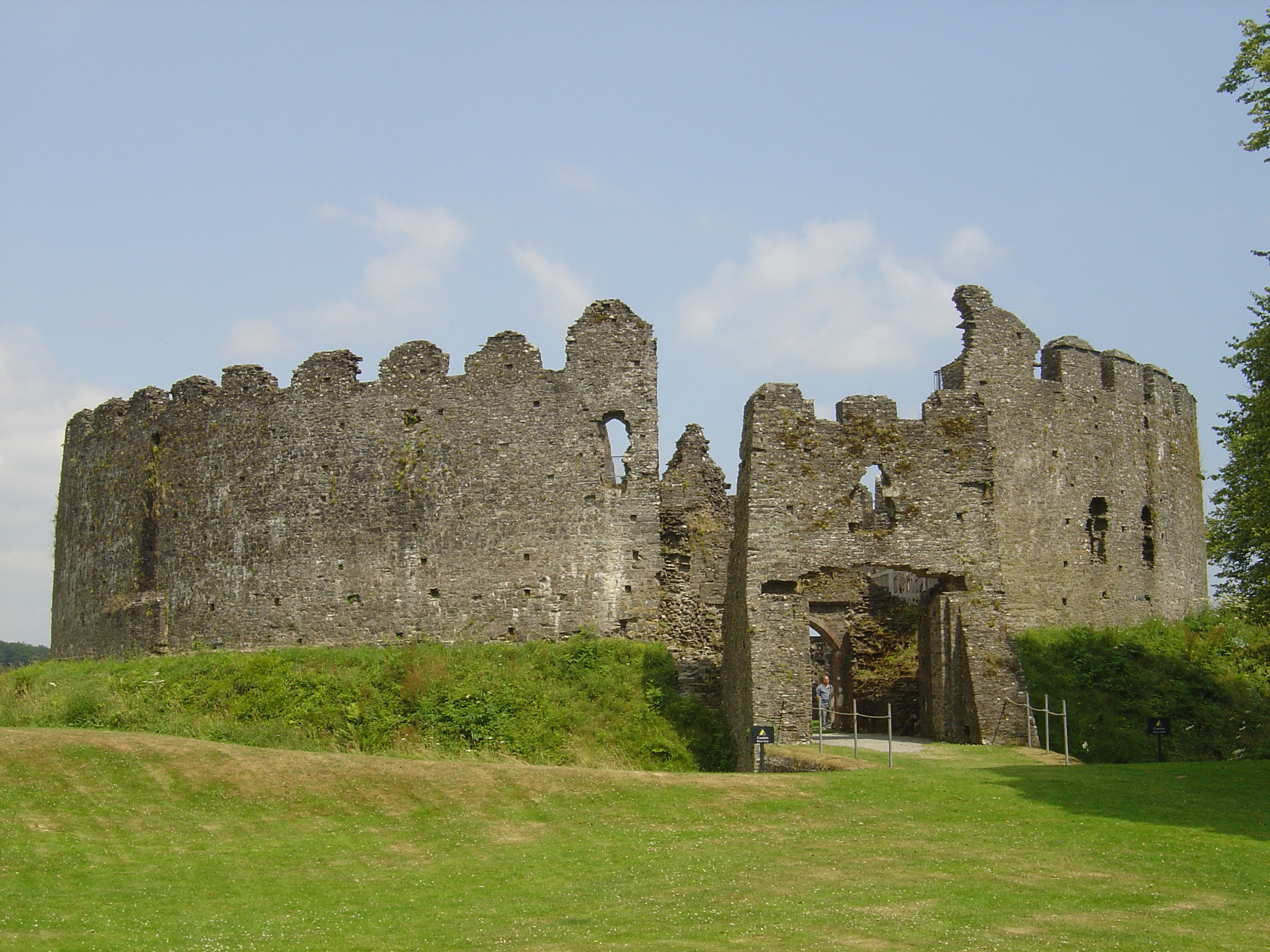
Restormel Castle's shell keep in Cornwall, England, converted to stone in the late 12th century

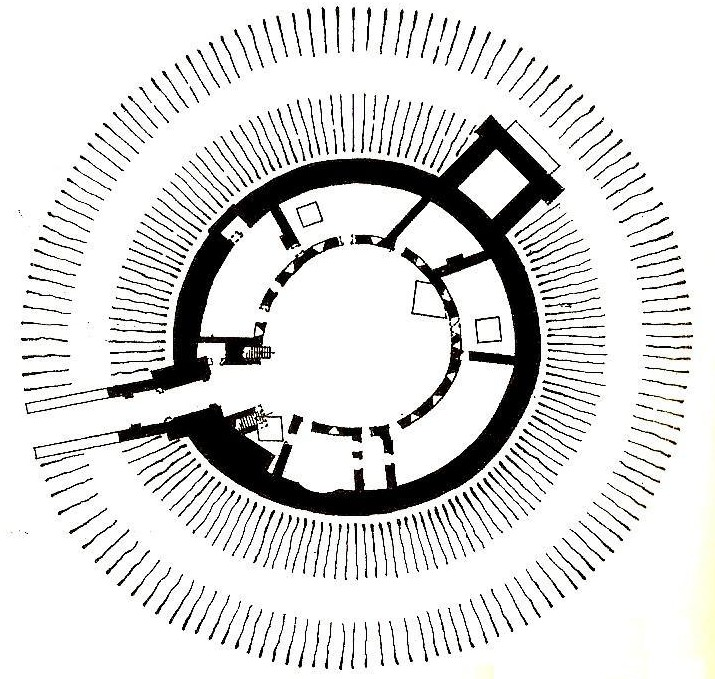

Nonetheless, many stone Norman keeps made considerable compromises to military utility. Norwich Castle, for example, included elaborate blind arcading on the outside of the building and appears to have had an entrance route designed for public ceremony, rather than for defence. The interior of the keep at Hedingham could certainly have hosted impressive ceremonies and events, but contained numerous flaws from a military perspective. Important early English and Welsh keeps such as the White Tower, Colchester, and Chepstow were all built in a distinctive Romanesque style, often reusing Roman materials and sites, and were almost certainly intended to impress and generate a political effect amongst local people. The political value of these keep designs, and the social prestige they lent to their builders, may help explain why they continued to be built in England into the late 12th century, beyond the point when military theory would have suggested that alternative designs were adopted.

The second early stone design, emerging from the 12th century onwards, was the shell keep, a donjon annulaire in French, which involved replacing the wooden keep on a motte, or the palisade on a ringwork, with a circular stone wall. Shell keeps were sometimes further protected by an additional low protective wall, called a chemise, around their base. Buildings could then be built around the inside of the shell, producing a small inner courtyard at the centre. The style was particularly popular in south-east England and across Normandy, although less so elsewhere. Restormel Castle is a classic example of this development, as is the later Launceston Castle; prominent Normandy and Low Country equivalents include Gisors and the Burcht van Leiden – these castles were amongst the most powerful fortifications of the period. Although the circular design held military advantages over one with square corners, as noted above these really mattered from only the end of the 12th century onwards; the major reason for adopting a shell keep design, in the 12th century at least, was the circular design of the original earthworks exploited to support the keep; indeed, some designs were less than circular in order to accommodate irregular mottes, such as that found at Windsor Castle.

=== Mid-medieval keeps (late 12th–14th centuries) ===
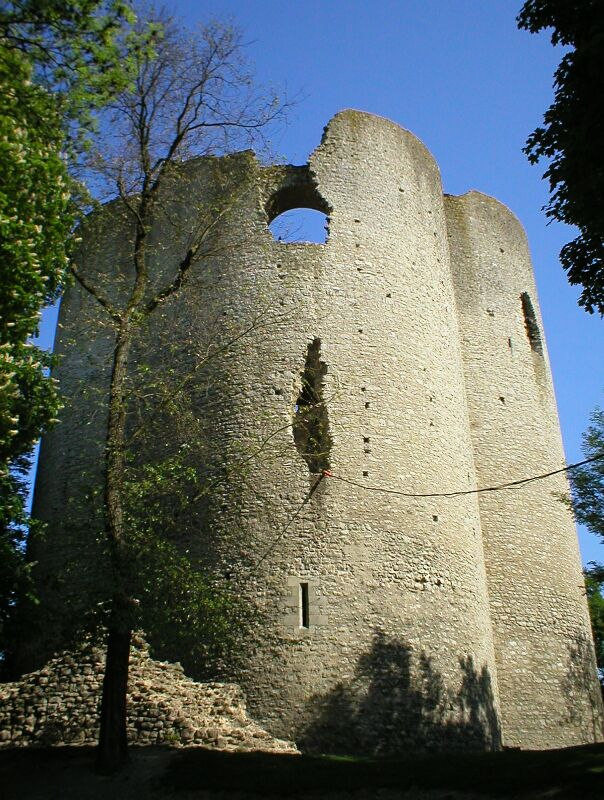

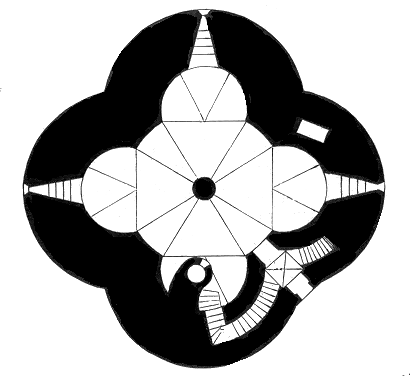
Keep at Château d'Étampes in France, a curved design begun in 1120

During the second half of the 12th century, a range of new keep designs began to appear across France and England, breaking the previous unity of the regional designs. The use of keeps in castles spread through Iberia, but some new castles never incorporated keeps in their designs. One traditional explanation for these developments emphasises the military utility of the new approaches, arguing, for example, that the curved surfaces of the new keeps helped to deflect attacks, or that they drew on lessons learnt during the Crusades from Islamic practices in the Levant. More recent historical analysis, however, has emphasised the political and social drivers that underlay these mid-medieval changes in keep design.

Through most of the 12th century, France was divided between the Capetian kings, ruling from the Île-de-France, and kings of England, who controlled Normandy and much of the west of France. Within the Capetian territories, early experimentation in new keep designs began at Houdan in 1120, where a circular keep was built with four round turrets; internally, however, the structure remained conventionally square. A few years later, Château d'Étampes adopted a quatrefoil design. (Note: Étampes may have influenced the later quatrefoil design of the keep at York Castle.) These designs, however, remained isolated experiments.

In the 1190s, however, the struggle for power in France began to swing in favour of Philip II, culminating in the Capetian capture of Normandy in 1204. Philip II started to construct completely circular keeps, such as the Tour Jeanne d'Arc, with most built in his newly acquired territories. The first of Philip's new keeps was begun at the Louvre in 1190 and at least another twenty followed, all built to a consistent standard and cost. The architectural idea of circular keeps may have come from Catalonia, where circular towers in castles formed a local tradition, and probably carried some military advantages, but Philip's intention in building these new keeps in a fresh style was clearly political, an attempt to demonstrate his new power and authority over his extended territories. As historian Philippe Durand suggests, these keeps provided military security and were a physical representation of the renouveau capétien, or Capetian renewal.

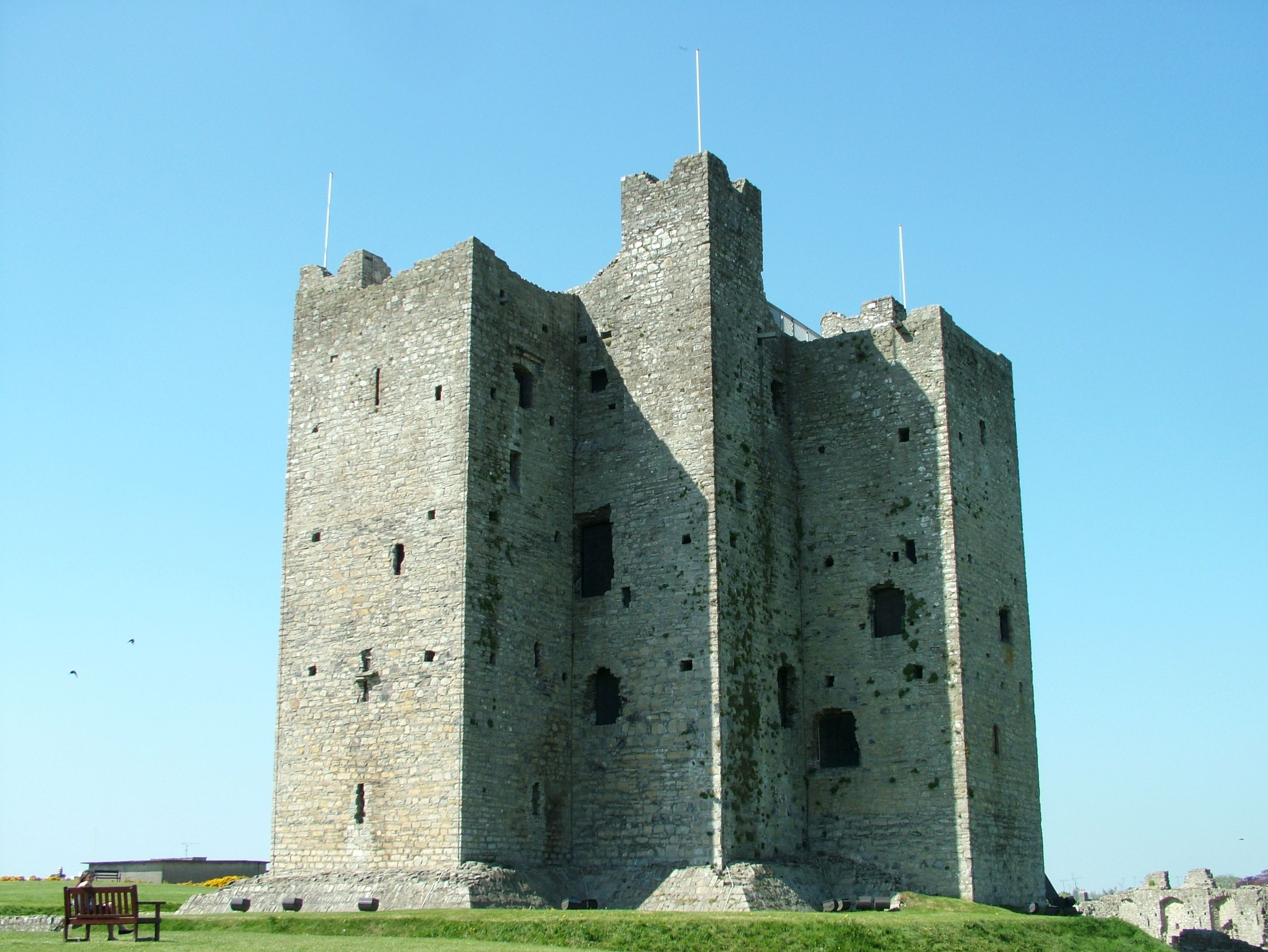
Keep at Trim Castle in Ireland, an angular design built in the late 12th century

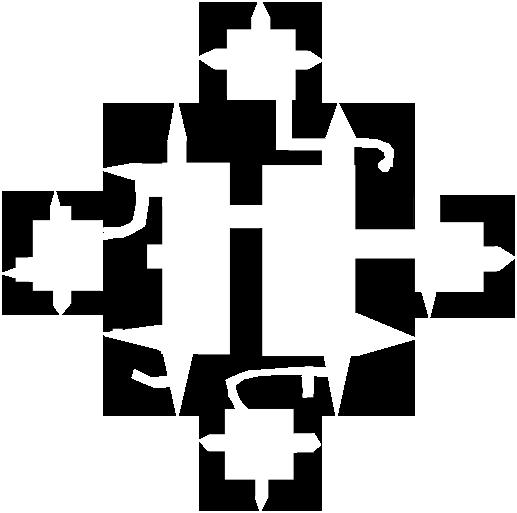

Keep design in England began to change only towards the end of the 12th century, later than in France. Wooden keeps on mottes ceased to be built across most of England by the 1150s, although they continued to be erected in Wales and along the Welsh Marches. By the end of the 12th century, England and Ireland saw a handful of innovative angular or polygonal keeps built, including the keep at Orford Castle, with three rectangular, clasping towers built out from the high, circular central tower; the cross-shaped keep of Trim Castle and the famous polygonal design at Conisborough. Despite these new designs, square keeps remained popular across much of England and, as late as the 1170s, square Norman great keeps were being built at Newcastle. Circular keep designs similar to those in France really became popular in Britain in the Welsh Marches and Scotland for only a short period during the early 13th century.

As with the new keeps constructed in France, these Anglo-Norman designs were informed both by military thinking and by political drivers. The keep at Orford has been particularly extensively analysed in this regard, and although traditional explanations suggested that its unusual plan was the result of an experimental military design, more recent analysis concludes that the design was instead probably driven by political symbolism and the need for Henry to dominate the contested lands of East Anglia. The architecture would, for mid-12th century nobility, have summoned up images of King Arthur or Constantinople, then the idealised versions of royal and imperial power. Even formidable military designs such as that at Château Gaillard were built with political effect in mind. Gaillard was designed to reaffirm Angevin authority in a fiercely disputed conflict zone and the keep, although militarily impressive, contained only an anteroom and a royal audience chamber, and was built on soft chalk and without an internal well, both serious defects from a defensive perspective.

During most of the medieval period, Iberia was divided between Christian and Islamic kingdoms, neither of which traditionally built keeps, instead building watchtowers or mural towers. By the 12th century, however, the influence of France and the various military orders was encouraging the development of square keeps in Christian castles across the region, and by the second half of the century this practice was spread across into the Islamic kingdoms.

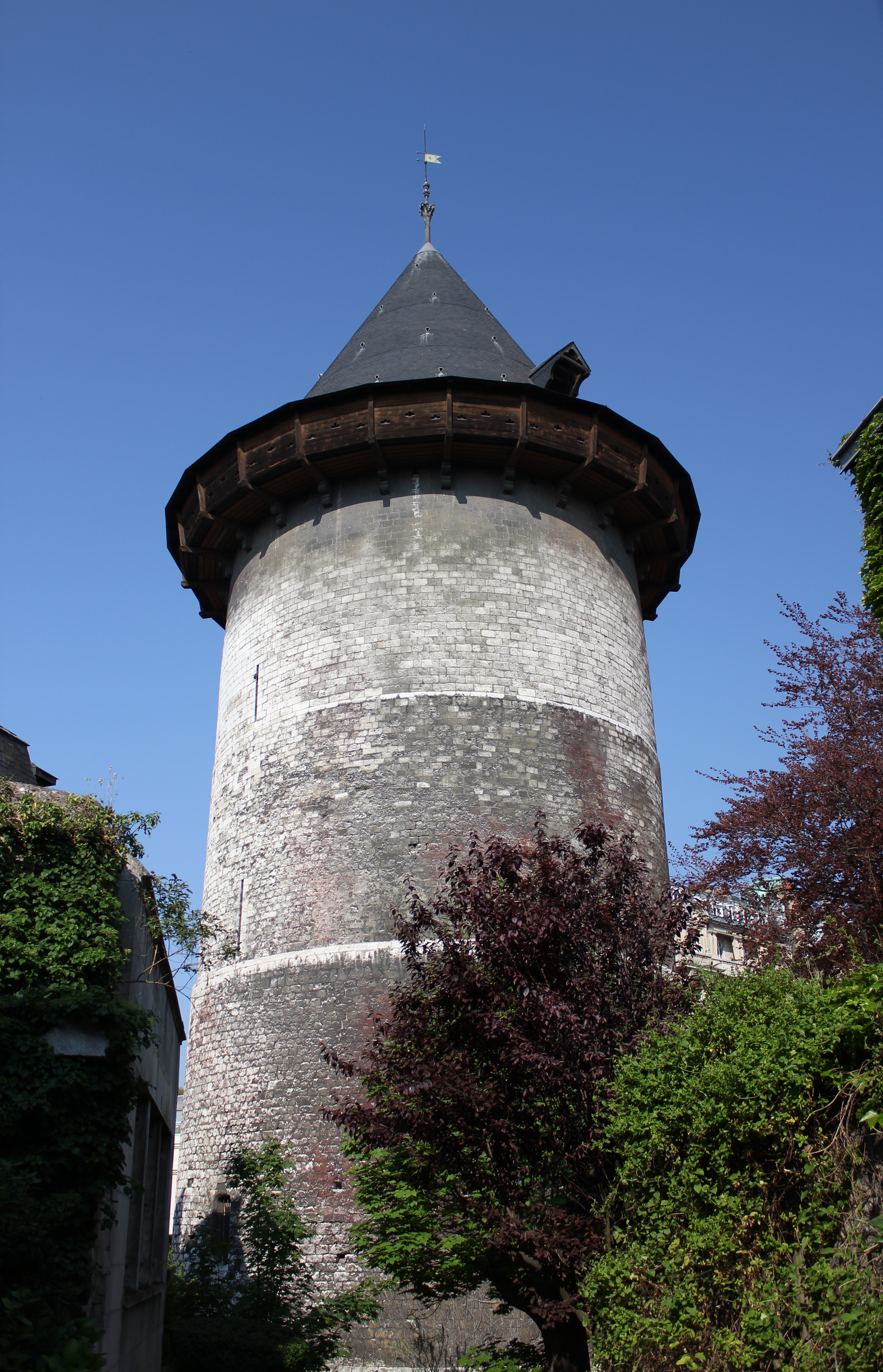

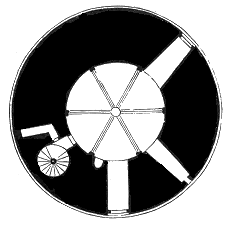
Tour Jeanne d'Arc at Rouen Castle in Normandy, France, a circular design built in 1204

By contrast, the remainder of Europe saw stone towers being used in castles, but not in a way that fulfilled the range of functions seen in the western European keeps. In the Low Countries, it became popular for the local nobility to build stand-alone, square towers, but rarely as part of a wider castle. Similarly, square stone towers became popular in Venice, but these did not fulfil the same role as western keeps. In Germany, rectangular stone castles began to replace motte-and-bailey castles from the 12th century onwards. These designs included stone versions of the traditional Bergfriede, which still remained distinct from the domestic keeps used in more western parts of Europe, with the occasional notable exception, such as the large, residential Bergfried at Eltville Castle.

Several designs for new castles emerged that made keeps unnecessary. One such design was the concentric approach, involving exterior walls guarded with towers, and perhaps supported by further, concentric layered defenses: thus castles such as Framlingham never had a central keep. Military factors may well have driven this development: R. Brown, for example, suggests that designs with a separate keep and bailey system inherently lacked a co-ordinated and combined defensive system, and that once bailey walls were sophisticated enough, a keep became militarily unnecessary. In England, gatehouses were also growing in size and sophistication until they too challenged the need for a keep in the same castle. The classic Edwardian gatehouse, with two large, flanking towers and multiple portcullises, designed to be defended from attacks both within and outside the main castle, has been often compared to the earlier Norman keeps: some of the largest gatehouses are called gatehouse keeps for this reason.

The quadrangular castle design that emerged in France during the 13th century was another development that removed the need for a keep. Castles had needed additional living space since their first emergence in the 9th century; initially this had been provided by halls in the bailey, then later by ranges of chambers alongside the inside of a bailey wall, such as at Goodrich. But French designs in the late 12th century took the layout of a contemporary unfortified manor house, whose rooms faced around a central, rectangular courtyard, and built a wall around them to form a castle. The result, illustrated initially at Yonne, and later at Château de Farcheville, was a characteristic quadrangular layout with four large, circular corner towers. It lacked a keep, which was not needed to support this design.

=== Late medieval keeps (14th–16th centuries) ===
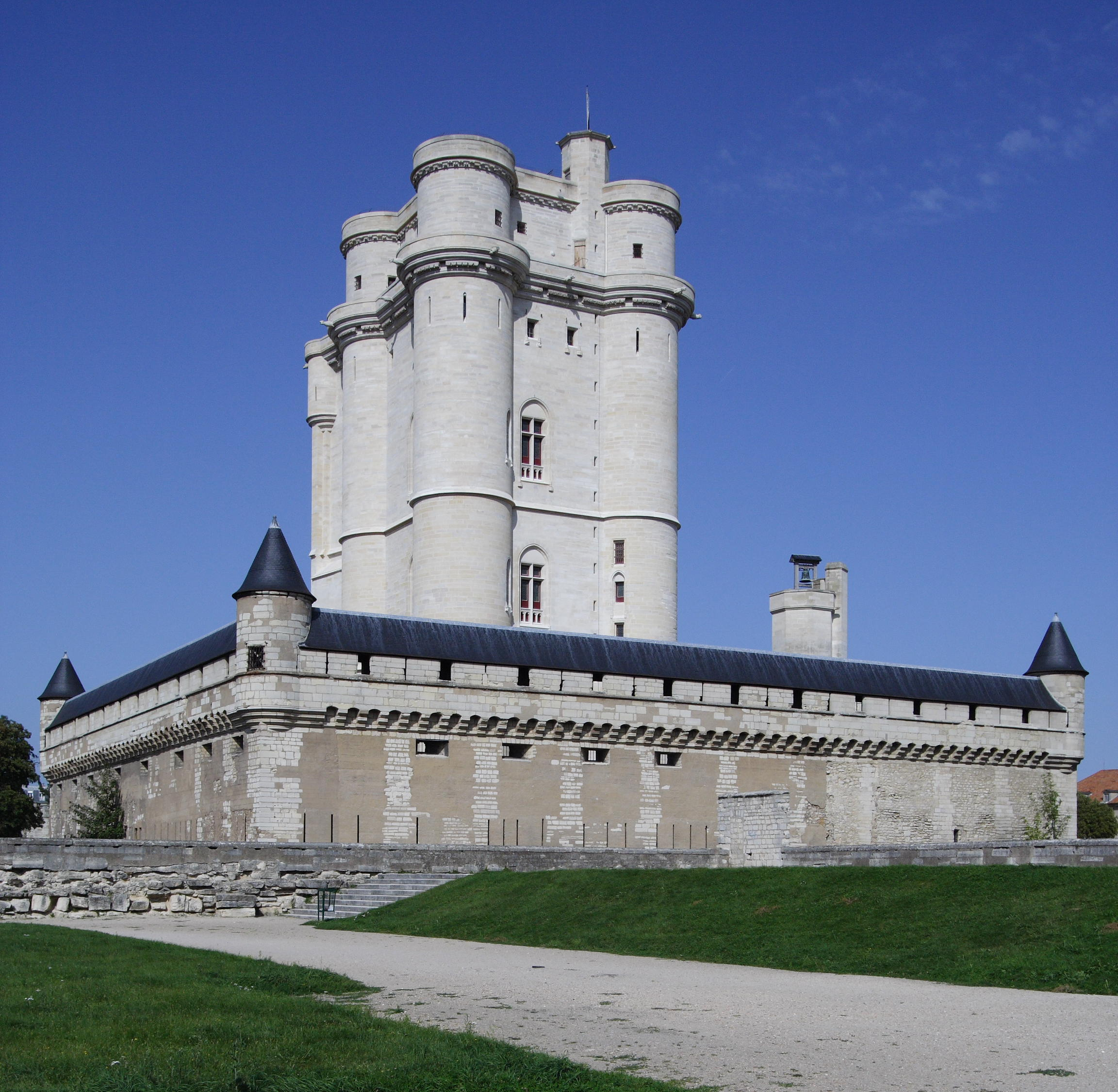
Keep at the Château de Vincennes in Paris, completed by 1360 as the heart of a palace fortress

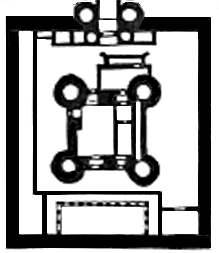

The end of the medieval period saw a fresh resurgence in the building of keeps in western castles. Some castles continued to be built without keeps: the Bastille in the 1370s, for example, combined a now traditional quadrangular design with machicolated corner towers, gatehouses and moat; the walls, innovatively, were of equal height to the towers. This fashion became copied across French and in England, particularly amongst the nouveau riche, for example at Nunney. The royalty and the very wealthiest in France, England and Spain, however, began to construct a small number of keeps on a much larger scale than before, in England sometimes termed tower keeps, as part of new palace fortresses. (Note: The term "tower house" is also used in the literature to describe this class of building.) This shift reflected political and social pressures, such as the desire of the wealthiest lords to have privacy from their growing households of retainers, as well as the various architectural ideas being exchanged across the region, despite the ongoing Hundred Years War between France and England.

The resurgence in French keep design began after the defeat of the royal armies at the battles of Crécy in 1346 and Poitiers in 1356, which caused high levels of social unrest across the remaining French territories. Charles V of France attempted to restore French royal authority and prestige through the construction of a new range of castles. The Château de Vincennes, where a new keep was completed under Charles by 1380, was the first example of these palace fortresses. The keep at Vincennes was highly innovative: six stories high, with a chemin de ronde running around the machicolated battlements; the luxuriously appointed building was protected by an enceinte wall that formed a "fortified envelope" around the keep. The Vincennes keep was copied elsewhere across France, particularly as the French kings reconquered territories from the English, encouraging a style that emphasised very tall keeps with prominent machicolations. No allowance for the emerging new gunpowder weapons was made in these keeps, although later in the century gunports were slowly being added, as for example by Charles VI to his keep at Saint-Malo.

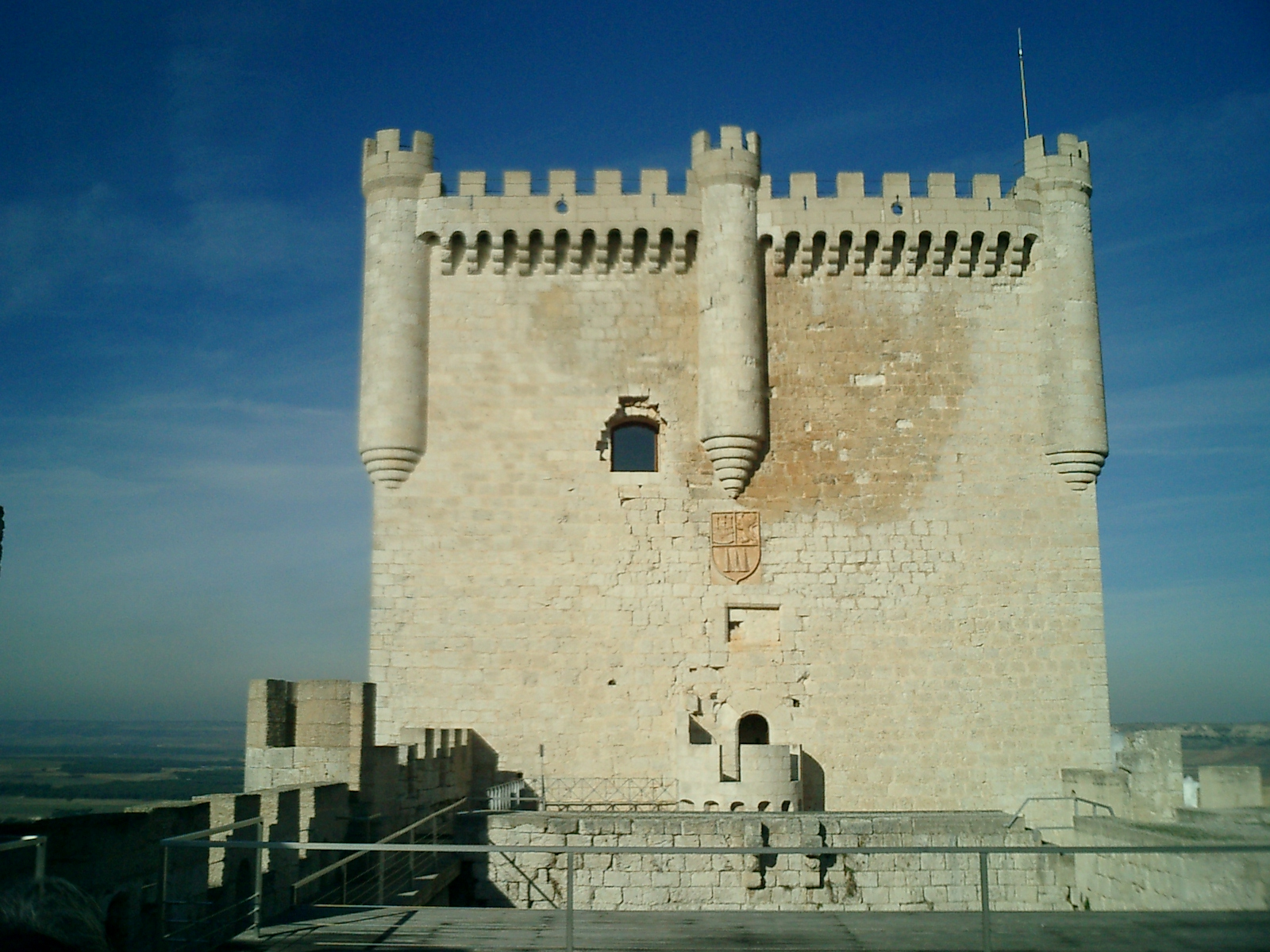
Keep at Peñafiel Castle in Spain, built in the mid-15th century

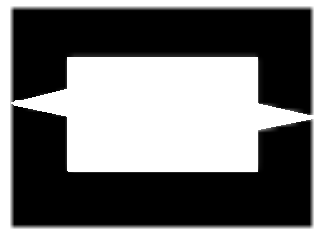

The French model spread into Iberia in the second half of the century, where the most powerful nobles in Castile built a number of similar tall keeps, such as that at Peñafiel, taking advantage of the weakness of the Castilian Crown during the period. Henry IV of Castile responded in the 15th century by creating a sequence of royal castles with prominent keeps at the Castle of La Mota, Portillo, and Alcázar of Segovia: built to particular proportions, these keeps became known as a key element of the Valladolid school of Spanish castle design (es:Escuela de Valladolid). Smaller versions of these keeps were subsequently built by many aspiring new aristocracy in Spain, including many converted Jews, keen to improve their social prestige and position in society. The French model of tall keeps was also echoed in some German castles, such as that at Karlštejn, although the layout and positioning of these towers still followed the existing bergfried model, rather than that in western castles. An other impressive 15th century metiterenian castle keep is the keep of the Kolossi Castle, in Cyprus, a three floor square keep, 21 meters high.

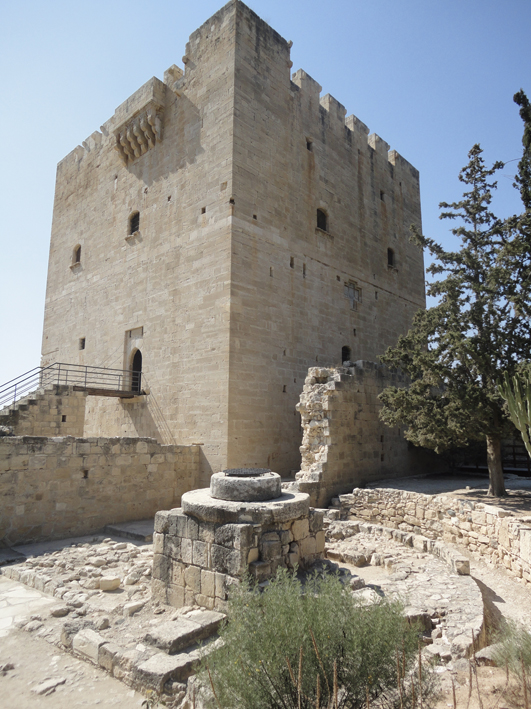
Keep at Kolossi Castle in Cyprus, built in the 1454

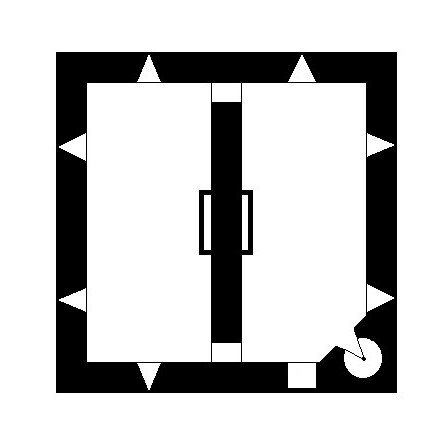

The 15th and 16th centuries saw a small number of English and occasional Welsh castles develop still grander keeps. The first of these large tower keeps were built in the north of England during the 14th century, at locations such as Warkworth. They were probably partially inspired by designs in France, but they also reflected the improvements in the security along the Scottish border during the period, and the regional rise of major noble families such as the Percies and the Nevilles, whose wealth encouraged a surge in castle building at the end of the 14th century. New castles at Raby, Bolton, and Warkworth Castle took the quadrangular castle styles of the south and combined them with exceptionally large tower keeps to form a distinctive, northern style. Built by major noble houses, these castles were typically even more opulent than the smaller castles like Nunney, built by the nouveau riche. They marked what historian Anthony Emery has described as a "...second peak of castle building in England and Wales," following on from the Edwardian designs at the end of the 14th century.

In the 15th century, the fashion for the creation of very expensive, French-influenced palatial castles featuring complex tower keeps spread, with new keeps being built at Wardour, Tattershall, and Raglan Castle. In central and eastern England, some keeps began to be built in brick, with Caister and Tattershall forming examples of this trend. In Scotland, the construction of Holyrood Great Tower between 1528 and 1532 drew on this English tradition, but incorporated additional French influences to produce a highly secure but comfortable keep, guarded by a gun park. These tower keeps were expensive buildings to construct, each built to a unique design for a specific lord and, as historian Norman Pounds has suggested, they "...were designed to allow very rich men to live in luxury and splendour."

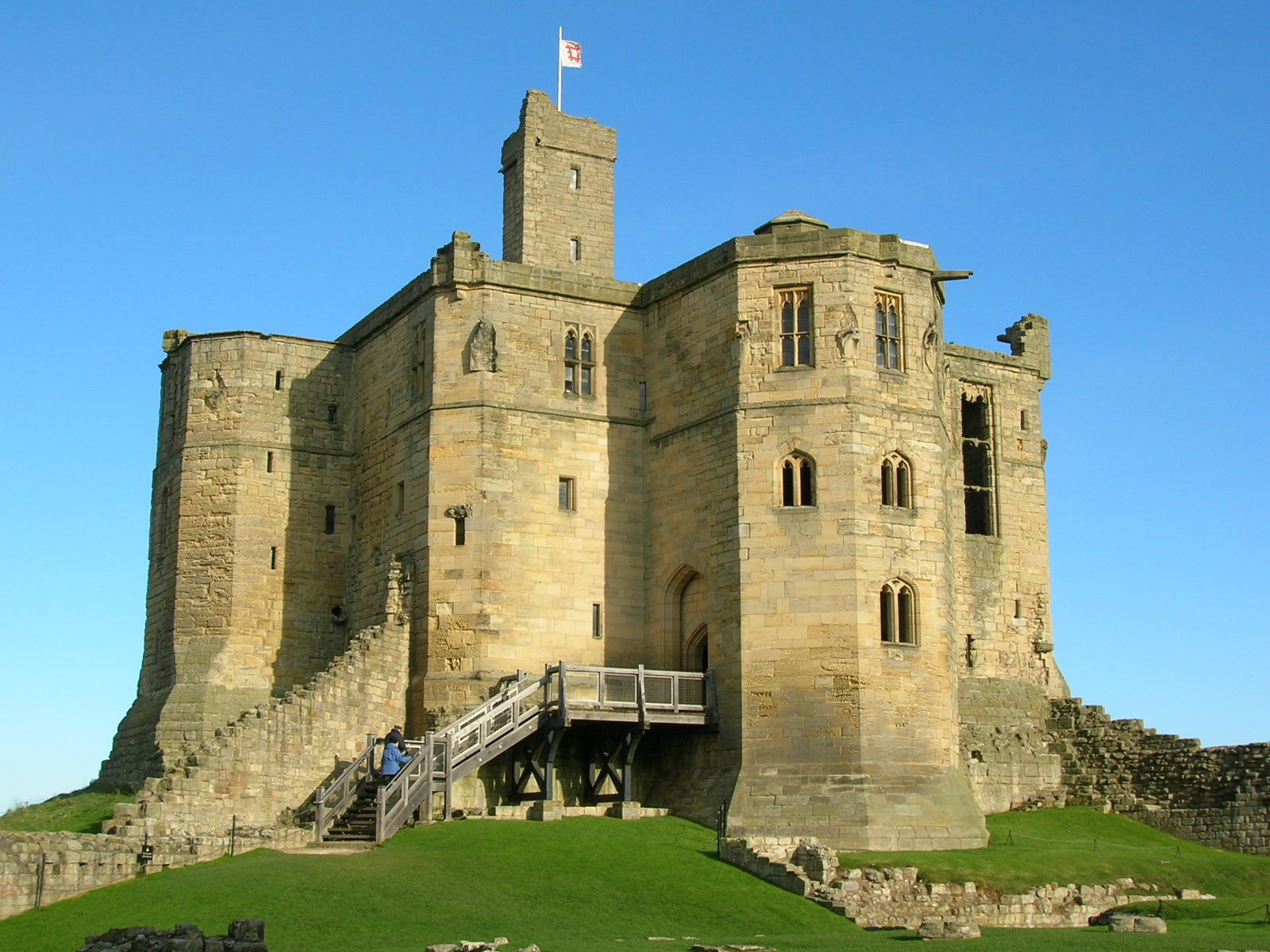
Keep at Warkworth Castle in Northumberland, England, a large tower keep built during the 1370s

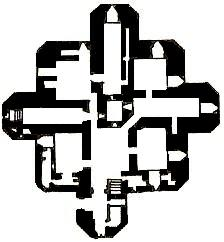

At the same time as these keeps were being built by the extremely wealthy, much smaller, keep-like structures called tower houses or peel towers were built across Ireland, Scotland, and northern England, often by relatively poorer local lords and landowners. (Note: Although tower houses are typically associated with smaller landowners, in Scotland larger tower houses were also built by the rich.) It was originally argued that Irish tower houses were based on the Scottish design, but the pattern of development of such castles in Ireland does not support this hypothesis. A tower house would typically be a tall, square, stone-built, crenelated building; Scottish and Ulster tower houses were often also surrounded by a barmkyn or bawn wall. Most academics have concluded that tower houses should not be classified as keeps but rather as a form of fortified house.

As the 16th century progressed, keeps fell out of fashion once again. In England, the gatehouse also began to supplant the keep as the key focus for a new castle development. By the 15th century, it was increasingly unusual for a lord to build both a keep and a large gatehouse at the same castle, and by the early 16th century, the gatehouse had easily overtaken the keep as the more fashionable feature: indeed, almost no new keeps were built in England after this period. The classical Palladian style began to dominate European architecture during the 17th century, causing a further move away from the use of keeps. Buildings in this style usually required considerable space for the enfiladed formal rooms that became essential for modern palaces by the middle of the century, and this style was impossible to fit into a traditional keep. (Note: As Edward Corp has illustrated in the case of the exiled James II, operating a modern 17th century court within an older style of building could be extremely challenging.) The keep at Bolsover Castle in England was one of the few to be built as part of a Palladian design.

=== Later use and destruction of keeps (17th–21st centuries) ===
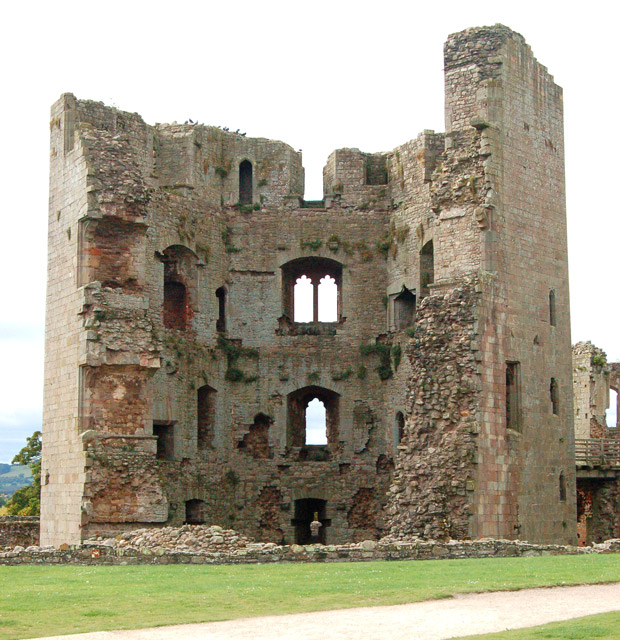

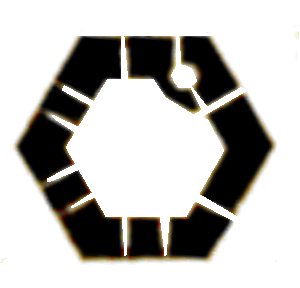
The slighted keep of Raglan Castle, Wales

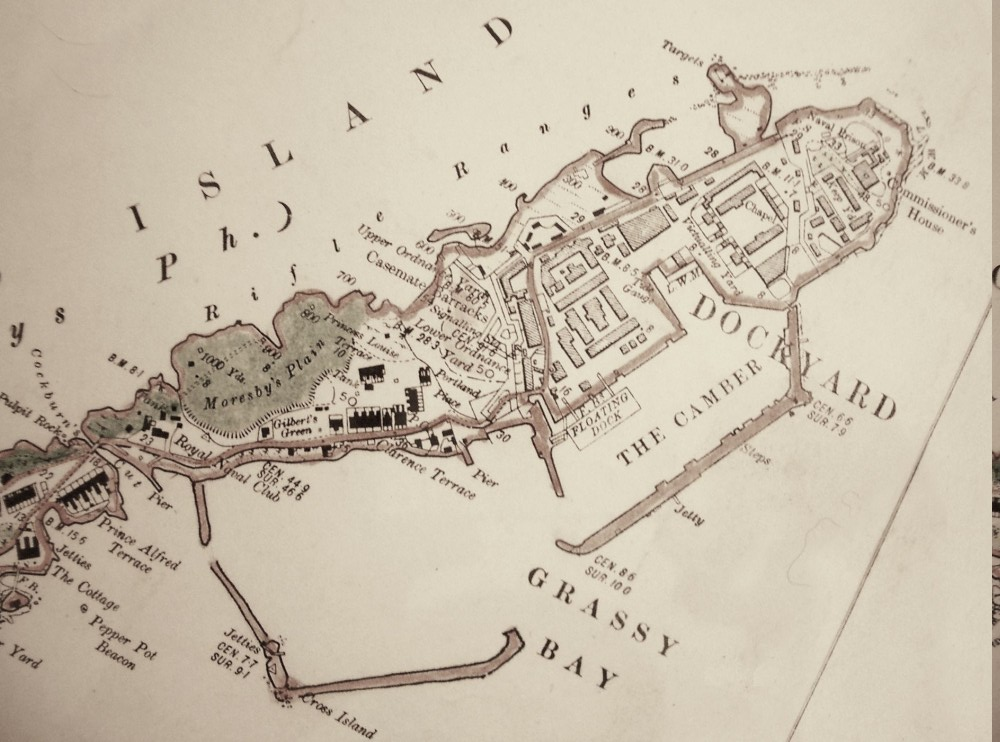
1899 Ordnance Survey map of the fortified Royal Naval Dockyard (to become the North Yard on completion of the South Yard, shown then under construction) in the Imperial fortress colony of Bermuda, with its Keep at the northern (right) end

From the 17th century onwards, some keeps were deliberately destroyed. In England, many were destroyed after the end of the Second English Civil War in 1649, when Parliament took steps to prevent another royalist uprising by slighting, or damaging, castles so as to prevent them from having any further military utility. Slighting was quite expensive and took considerable effort to carry out, so damage was usually done in the most cost-efficient fashion with only selected walls being destroyed. Keeps were singled out for particular attention in this process because of their continuing political and cultural importance, and the prestige they lent their former royalist owners – at Kenilworth, for example, only the keep was slighted, and at Raglan, the keep was the main focus of parliamentary activity. There was some equivalent destruction of keeps in France in the 17th and 18th centuries, such as the slighting of Montaiguillon by Cardinal Richelieu in 1624, but the catalogue of damage was far less than that of the 1640s and early 1650s in England.

In England, ruined medieval castles became fashionable again in the middle of the 18th century. They were considered an interesting counterpoint to Palladian classical architecture, and gave a degree of medieval allure to their owners. Some keeps were modified to exaggerate this effect: Hawarden, for example, was remodelled to appear taller but also more decayed, the better to produce a good silhouette. The interest continued and, in the late 18th and 19th century, it became fashionable to build intact, replica castles in England, resulting in what A. Rowan has called the Norman style of new castle building, characterised by the inclusion of large keeps; the final replica keep to be built in this way was at Penrhyn between 1820 and 1840.

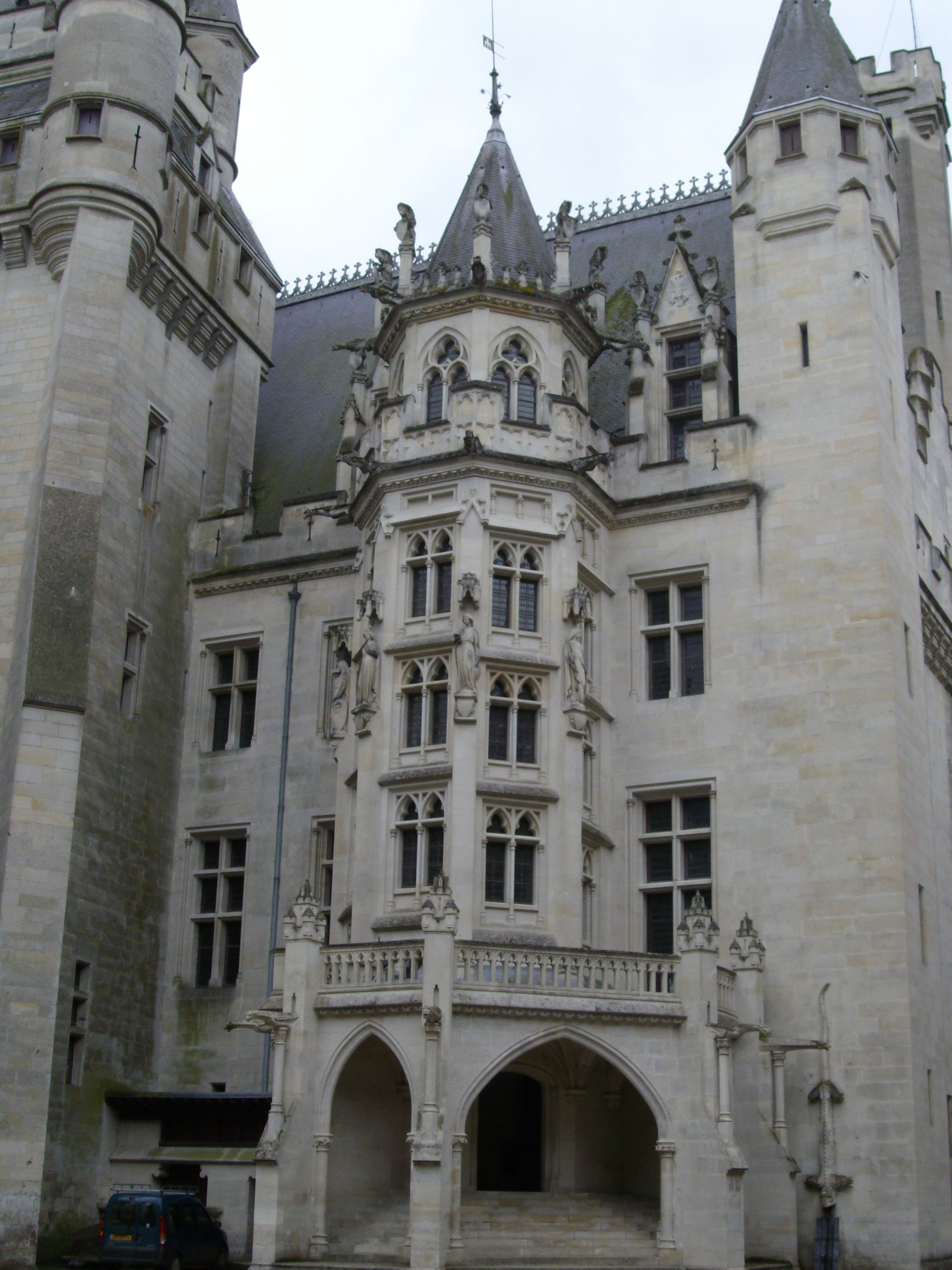

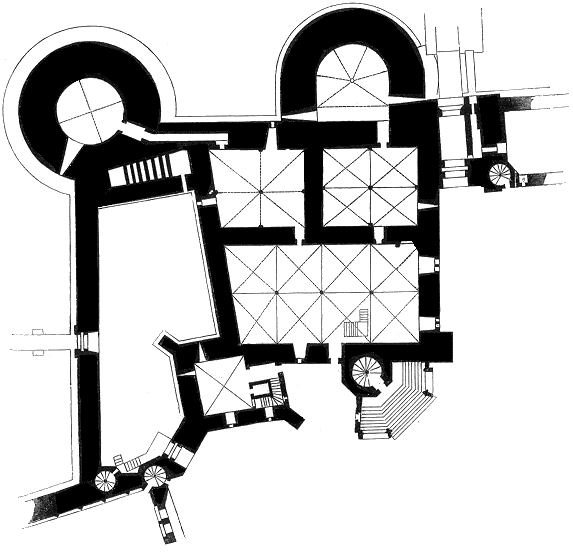
The keep of Château de Pierrefonds, France, rebuilt during the 19th century in a Gothic Revival style

Where there was an existing castle on a site, another response across 19th-century Europe was to attempt to improve the buildings, bringing their often chaotic historic features into line with a more integrated architectural aesthetic, in a style often termed Gothic Revivalism. There were numerous attempts to restore or rebuild keeps so as to produce this consistently Gothic style: in England, the architect Anthony Salvin was particularly prominent – as illustrated by reworking and heightening of the keep at Windsor Castle, while in France, Eugène Viollet-le-Duc reworked the keeps at castles in locations like Pierrefonds during the 1860s and 1870s, admittedly in a largely speculative fashion, since the original keep had been mostly destroyed in 1617.

The Spanish Civil War and First and Second World Wars in the 20th century caused damage to many castle keeps across Europe; in particular, the famous keep at Coucy was destroyed by the German Army in 1917. By the late 20th century the conservation of castle keeps formed part of government policy across France, England, Ireland, and Spain. In the 21st century in England, most keeps are in ruins and form part of the tourism and heritage industries, rather than being used as functioning buildings – the keep of Windsor Castle being a rare exception. In Germany, large numbers of the bergfried towers were restored as functional buildings in the late 19th and early 20th centuries, often as government offices or youth hostels, or the modern conversion of tower houses, which in many cases have become modernised domestic homes.

== See also ==
- Tenshu, the Japanese castle keep, often wooden
- Medieval architecture
- Semi-fortified Romanian culă
- Čardak, similar fortifications used by South Slavs

== Bibliography ==
- Anderson, William. (1980) Castles of Europe: From Charlemagne to the Renaissance. London: Ferndale. ISBN 0-905746-20-1.
- Armitage, Ella S. (1912) The Early Norman Castles of the British isles. London: J. Murray. OCLC 458514584.
- Baldwin, John W. (1991) The Government of Philip Augustus: Foundations of French Royal Power in the Middle Ages. Berkeley, US: University of California Press. ISBN 978-0-520-07391-3.
- Barroca, Mário Jorge. (1991) "Do Castelo da Reconquista ao Castelo Românico (Séc. IX a XII)", Portvgalia XI-XII, pp. 89–136.
- Brindle, Steven and Brian Kerr. (1997) Windsor Revealed: New Light on the History of the Castle. London: English Heritage. ISBN 978-1-85074-688-1.
- Brown, R. Allen. (1962) English Castles. London: Batsford. OCLC 1392314.
- Burton, Peter (2008), "Islamic Castles in Iberia" (PDF), The Castle Studies Group Journal, 21: 228–244
- Butler, Lawrence. (1997) Clifford's Tower and the Castles of York. London: English Heritage. ISBN 1-85074-673-7.
- Châtelain, André. (1983) Châteaux Forts et Féodalité en Ile de France, du XIème au XIIIème siècle. Nonette: Créer. ISBN 978-2-902894-16-1. (in French)
- Corp, Edward. (2009) "The Jacobite Court at Saint-Germain-en-Laye: Etiquette and the Use of the Royal Apartments", in
- Creighton, Oliver Hamilton and Robert Higham. (2003) Medieval Castles. Princes Risborough, UK: Shire Publications. ISBN 978-0-7478-0546-5.
- Creighton, Oliver Hamilton. (2005) Castles and Landscapes: Power, Community, and Fortification in Medieval England. London: Equinox. ISBN 978-1-904768-67-8.
- Cruickshanks, Eveline. (ed) (2009) The Stuart Courts. Stroud, UK: The History Press. ISBN 978-0-7524-5206-7.
- DeVries, Kelly. (2003) Medieval Military Technology. Toronto, Canada: University of Toronto Press. ISBN 978-0-921149-74-3.
- Dixon, Philip. (2002) "The Myth of the Keep", in Meirion-Jones, Impey and Jones (ed) (2002).
- Durand, Philippe. (1999) Le Château-fort. Paris: Gisserot. ISBN 978-2-87747-435-1. (in French)
- Emery, Anthony. (2006) Greater Medieval Houses of England and Wales, 1300–1500: Southern England. Cambridge: Cambridge University Press. ISBN 978-0-521-58132-5.
- Gomme, Andor and Alison Maguire. (2008) Design and Plan in the Country House: From Castle Donjons to Palladian Boxes. Yale: Yale University Press. ISBN 978-0-300-12645-7.
- Gondoin, Stéphane W. (2005) Châteaux-Forts: Assiéger et Fortifier au Moyen Âge. Paris: Cheminements. ISBN 978-2-84478-395-0. (in French)
- Hanser, David A. (2006) Architecture of France. Westport, US: Greenwood Press. ISBN 978-0-313-31902-0.
- Heslop, T. A. (2003) "Orford Castle: Nostalgia and Sophisticated Living", in Liddiard (ed) 2003.
- Higham, Robert and Philip Barker. (1992) Timber Castles. London: Batsford. ISBN 978-0-85989-754-9.
- Historic England (24 Oct 1950), "Rochester Castle (1336100)", National Heritage List for England
- Hull, Lise E. (2006) Britain's Medieval Castles. Westport: Praeger. ISBN 978-0-275-98414-4.
- Hulme, Richard (2008), "Twelfth Century Great Towers – The Case for the Defence" (PDF), The Castle Studies Group Journal, 21: 209–229
- Jones, Nigel R. (2005) Architecture of England, Scotland, and Wales. Westport, US: Greenwood Publishing. ISBN 978-0-313-31850-4.
- Kaufmann, J. E. and H. W. Kaufmann. (2004) The Medieval Fortress: Castles, Forts, and Walled Cities of the Middle Ages. Cambridge, US: Da Capo. ISBN 978-0-306-81358-0.
- Kenyon, J. and M. W. Thompson. (1995) "A Note on the Word 'keep'", Medieval Archaeology 38, pp. 175–6.
- Kenyon, John R. (2005) Medieval Fortifications. London: Continuum. ISBN 978-0-8264-7886-3.
- King, D. J. Cathcart. (1991) The Castle in England and Wales: An Interpretative History. London: Routledge. ISBN 0-415-00350-4.
- Liddiard, Robert. (ed) (2003) Anglo-Norman Castles. Woodbridge, UK: Boydell Press. ISBN 978-0-85115-904-1.
- Liddiard, Robert. (2005) Castles in Context: Power, Symbolism, and Landscape, 1066 to 1500. Macclesfield, UK: Windgather Press. ISBN 0-9545575-2-2.
- McNeill, Tom. (2000) Castles in Ireland: Feudal Power in a Gaelic World. London: Routledge. ISBN 978-0-415-22853-4.
- Meirion-Jones, Gwyn, Edward Impey and Michael Jones. (eds) (2002) The Seigneurial Residence in Western Europe AD c800-1600. Oxford: Archaeopress. ISBN 978-1-84171-466-0.
- Nicholson, Helen J. (2004) Medieval Warfare: Theory and Practice of War in Europe, 300–1500. Basingstoke, UK: Palgrave Macmillan. ISBN 978-0-333-76330-8.
- Pettifer, Adrian. (2000a) Welsh Castles: a Guide by Counties. Woodbridge, UK: Boydell Press. ISBN 978-0-85115-778-8.
- Pettifer, Adrian. (2000b) English Castles: a Guide by Counties. Woodbridge, UK: Boydell Press. ISBN 978-0-85115-782-5.
- Pounds, Norman John Greville. (1994) The Medieval Castle in England and Wales: a Social and Political History. Cambridge: Cambridge University Press. ISBN 978-0-521-45828-3.
- Purton, Peter. (2010) A History of the Late Medieval Siege, 1200–1500. Woodbridge, UK: Boydell Press. ISBN 978-1-84383-449-6.
- Rowan, A. J. (1952) The Castle Style in British Domestic Architecture in the 18th and 19th Centuries. Cambridge: Cambridge University, Unpublished Ph.D. thesis.
- Schulz, Juergen. (2004) The New Palaces of Medieval Venice. University Park, US: Pennsylvania State University Press. ISBN 978-0-271-02351-9.
- Stubbs, John H. and Emily G. Makaš. (2011) Architectural Conservation in Europe and the Americas. Hoboken, US: John Wiley. ISBN 978-0-470-60385-7.
- Tabraham, Chris J. (2005) Scotland's Castles. London: Batsford. ISBN 978-0-7134-8943-9.
- Taylor, Robert R. (1998) The Castles of the Rhine: Recreating the Middle Ages in Modern Germany. Ontario, Canada: Wilfrid Laurier University Press. ISBN 978-0-88920-268-9.
- Thompson, M. W. (1960) "Recent excavations in the keep of Farnham Castle, Surrey, Medieval Archaeology 4, pp. 81–94 doi:10.5284/1071364
- Thompson, M. W. (1994) The Decline of the Castle. Leicester, UK: Harveys Books. ISBN 1-85422-608-8.
- Thompson, M. W. (2008) The Rise of the Castle. Cambridge: Cambridge University Press. ISBN 978-0-521-08853-4.
- Toy, Sidney. (1933) "The Round Castles of Cornwall", Archaeologia 83, pp. 204–7. doi:10.1017/S0261340900005415
- Toy, Sidney. (1985) Castles: Their Construction and History. New York: Dover Publications. ISBN 978-0-486-24898-1.
- Turner, Rick. (2006) Chepstow Castle. Cardiff, UK: Cadw. ISBN 978-1-85760-229-6.
- Tuulse, Armin. (1958) Castles of the Western World. Newton Abbot, UK: David and Charles. ISBN 978-0-486-42332-6.
- Viollet-le-Duc, Eugène Emmanuel. (1854) Dictionnaire Raisonné de L'architecture Française du XIe au XVIe Siècle. Paris: Bance. OCLC 7056424. (in French)
