= Louan-Villegruis-Fontaine =

- Commune
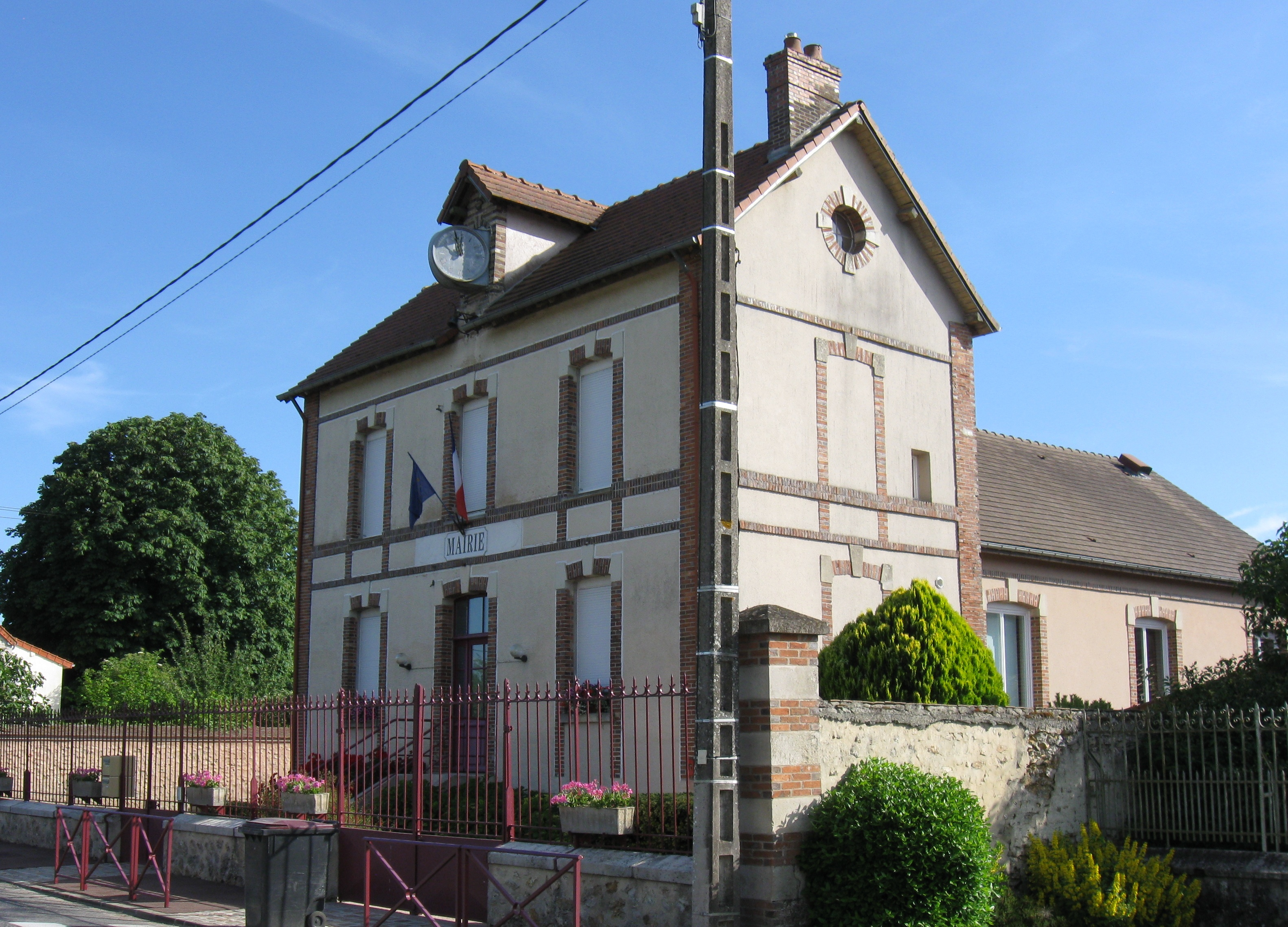
- The town hall in Louan-Villegruis-Fontaine

- Coat of arms
- Location of Louan-Villegruis-Fontaine
- Location within France Location within Île-de-France (region)
- Coordinates: 48°37′32″N 3°28′48″E
- Country: France
- Region: Île-de-France
- Department: Seine-et-Marne
- Arrondissement: Provins
- Canton: Provins
- Intercommunality: Provinois

Government
  - Mayor (2020–2026): James Dane
- Area^{1}: 38.05 km^{2} (14.69 sq mi)
- Highest elevation: 207 m (679 ft)
- Lowest elevation: 125 m (410 ft)
- Population (2023): 491
  - Density: 12.9/km^{2} (33.4/sq mi)
- Time zone: UTC+01:00 (CET)
  - Summer (DST): UTC+02:00 (CEST)
- INSEE/Postal code: 77262 /77560
- ^{1} French Land Register data, which excludes lakes, ponds, glaciers > 1 km^{2} (0.386 sq mi or 247 acres) and river estuaries.

Louan-Villegruis-Fontaine (French pronunciation: [lwɑ̃ vilɡʁɥi fɔ̃tɛn]) is a commune in the Seine-et-Marne department in the Île-de-France region in north-central France.

== Geography ==
The river Aubetin forms part of the commune's northern border.

== Demographics ==
Inhabitants are called Louannais.

== See also ==
- Château de Montaiguillon
- Communes of the Seine-et-Marne department
