= Kolossi Castle =

- Κάστρο του Κολοσσιού (Greek)
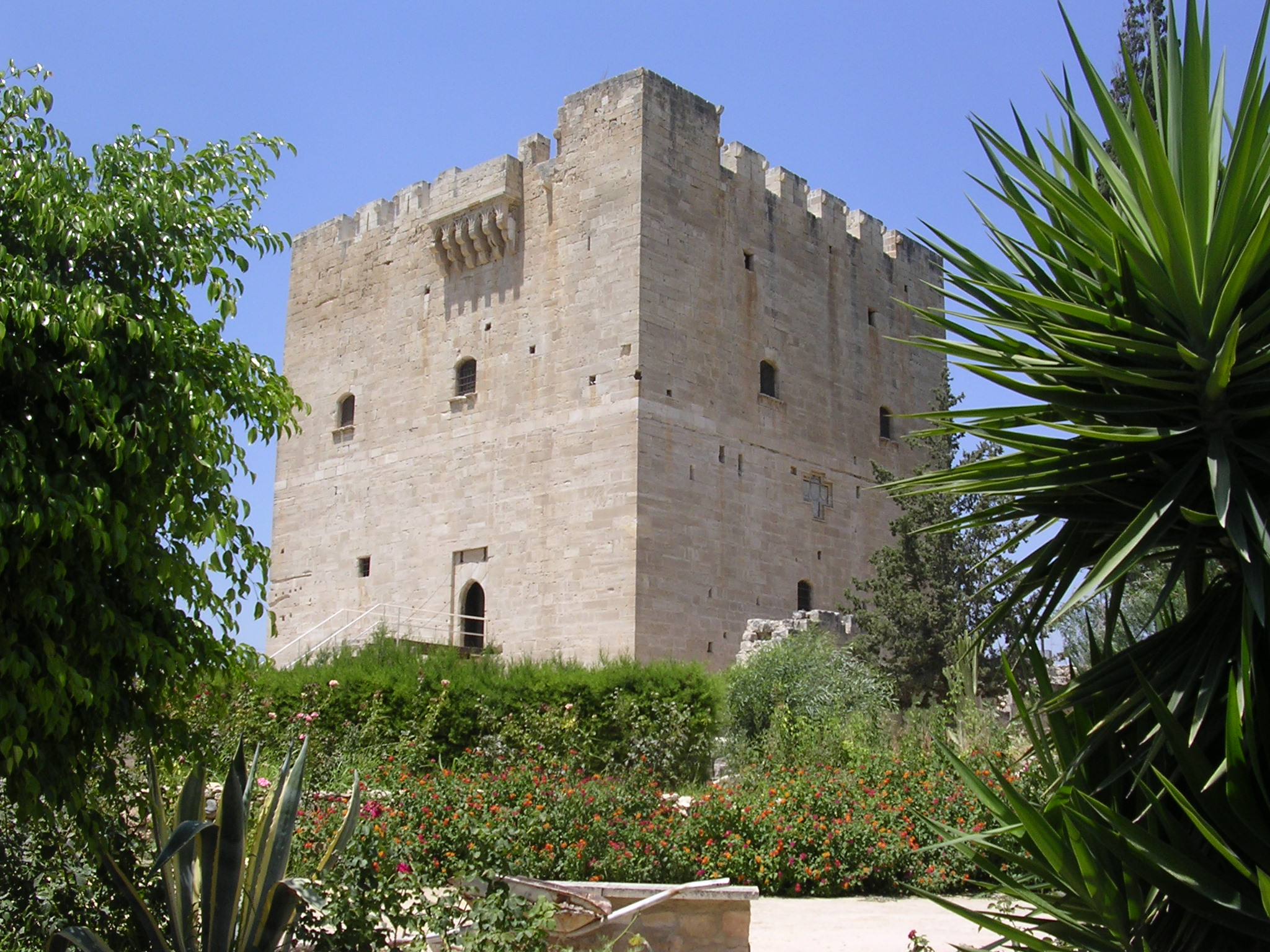
- Kolossi Castle

- Location within Cyprus

General information
- Architectural style: Gothic
- Location: Limassol, Cyprus
- Coordinates: 34.665273°N 32.933957°E
- Completed: 1454

Kolossi Castle is a former Crusader stronghold on the island of Cyprus, at the southwest edge of the village of Kolossi 14 kilometres (9 mi) west of the city of Limassol. It held great strategic importance in the Middle Ages, and contained large facilities for the production of sugar from the local sugarcane, one of Cyprus's main exports in the period. The original castle was possibly built in 1210 by the Frankish military, when the land of Kolossi was given by King Hugh I to the Knights Hospitaller.

The present castle was built in 1454 by the Hospitallers under the Commander of Kolossi, Louis de Magnac, whose coat-of-arms was carved into the castle's walls.

Owing to rivalry among the factions in the Crusader Kingdom of Cyprus, the castle was taken by the Knights Templar in 1306, but was returned to the Hospitallers in 1313 following the abolition of the Templars.

The castle today consists of a single three-storey square keep, 21 m (69 ft) high and with dimensions 17 m × 17 m (56 ft × 56 ft). It has an attached rectangular enclosure or bailey about 30 by 40 metres (98 by 131 ft).

As well as for its sugar, the area is also known for its sweet wine, Commandaria. At the wedding banquet after King Richard the Lionheart's marriage to Berengaria of Navarre at nearby Limassol, he allegedly declared it to be the "wine of kings and the king of wines." It has been produced in the region for millennia, and is thought to be the oldest continually-produced and named wine in the world, known for centuries as "Commandaria" after the Templars' grand commandery there.

== In literature ==
Kolossi Castle appears in many works of fiction, including La milicia de Dios by the Spanish writer Eduardo García-Ontiveros Cerdeño. It also appears in Snow Wasted by the Cypriot author Matthew Malekos and in the novels of several British writers, including Race of Scorpions: The House of Noccolo by Dorothy Dunnett, In Search of Sixpence by Michael Paraskos and Lionheart by Stewart Binns.

== Gallery ==
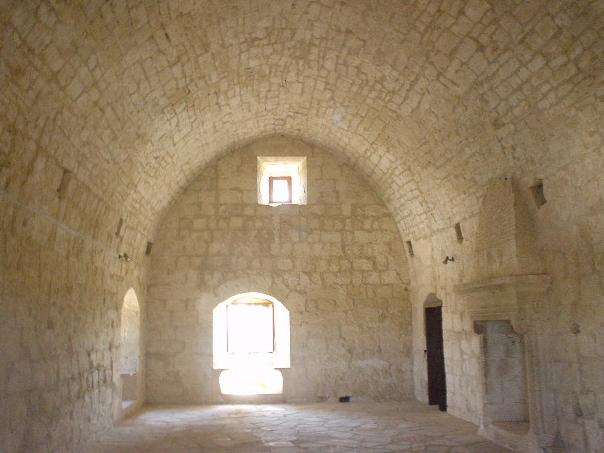
Ground-floor hall

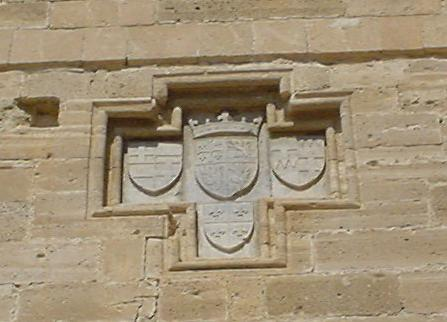
Lusignan escutcheon on eastern wall

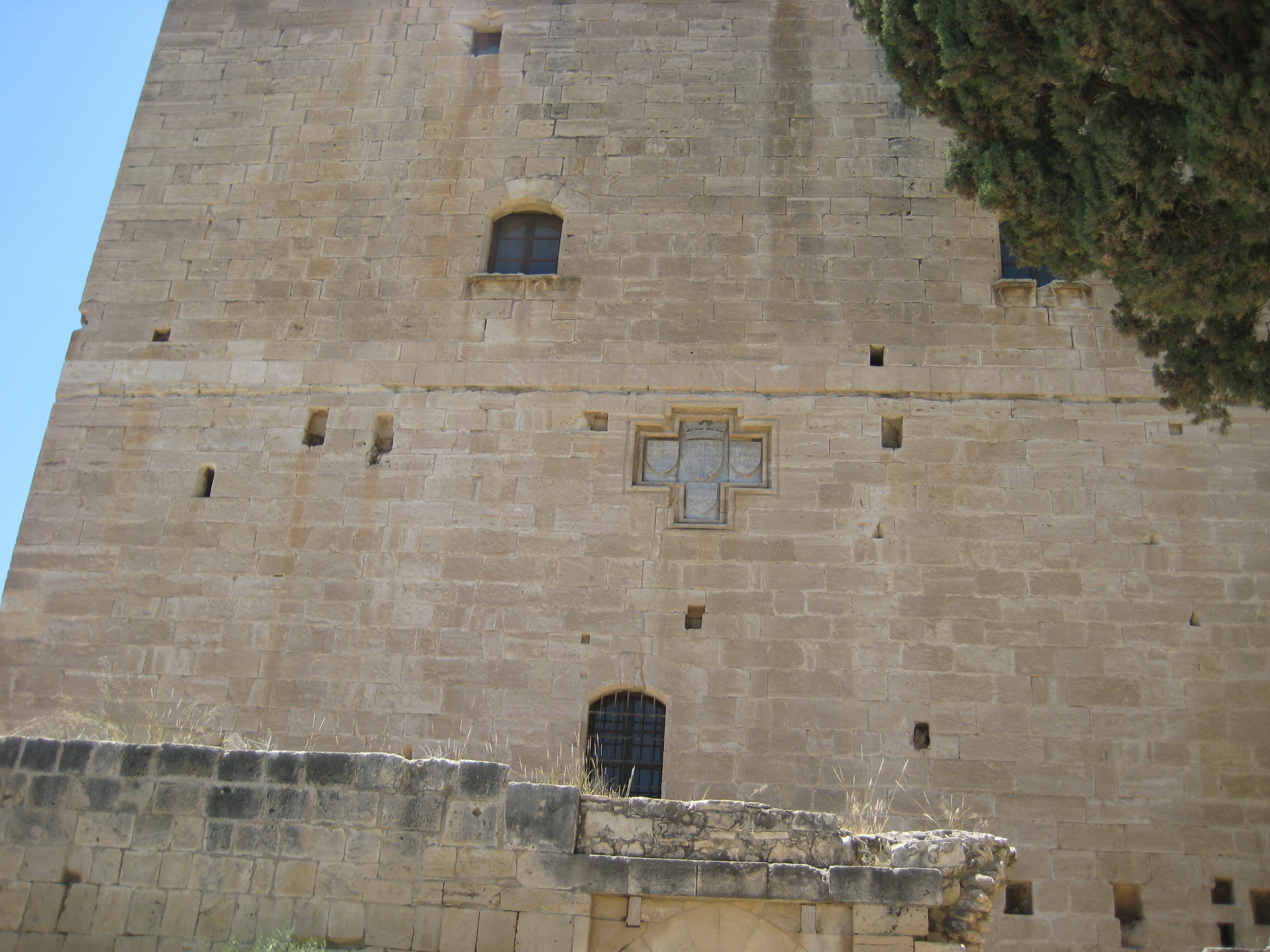
Lusignan-dynasty escutcheon

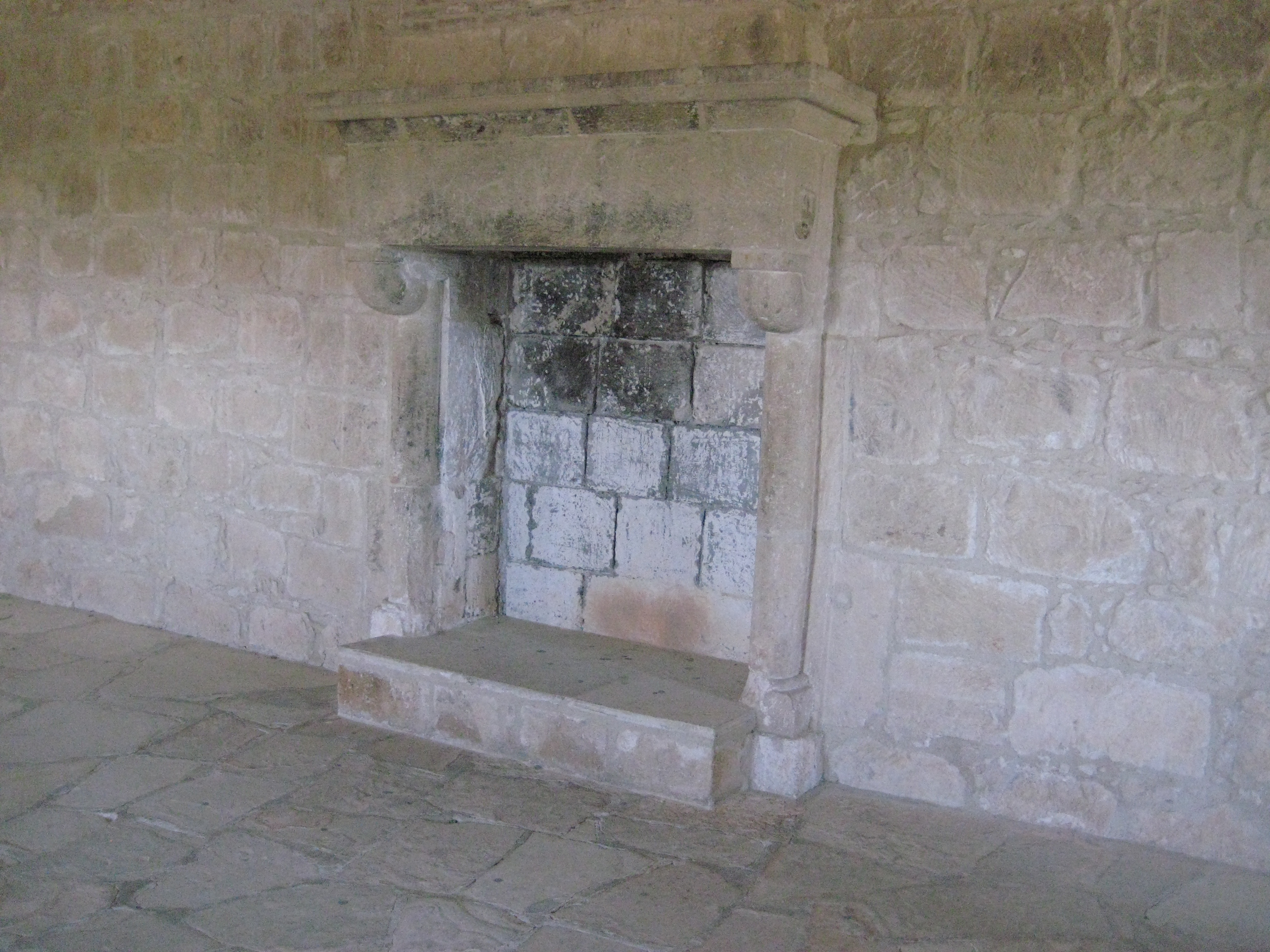
Fireplace

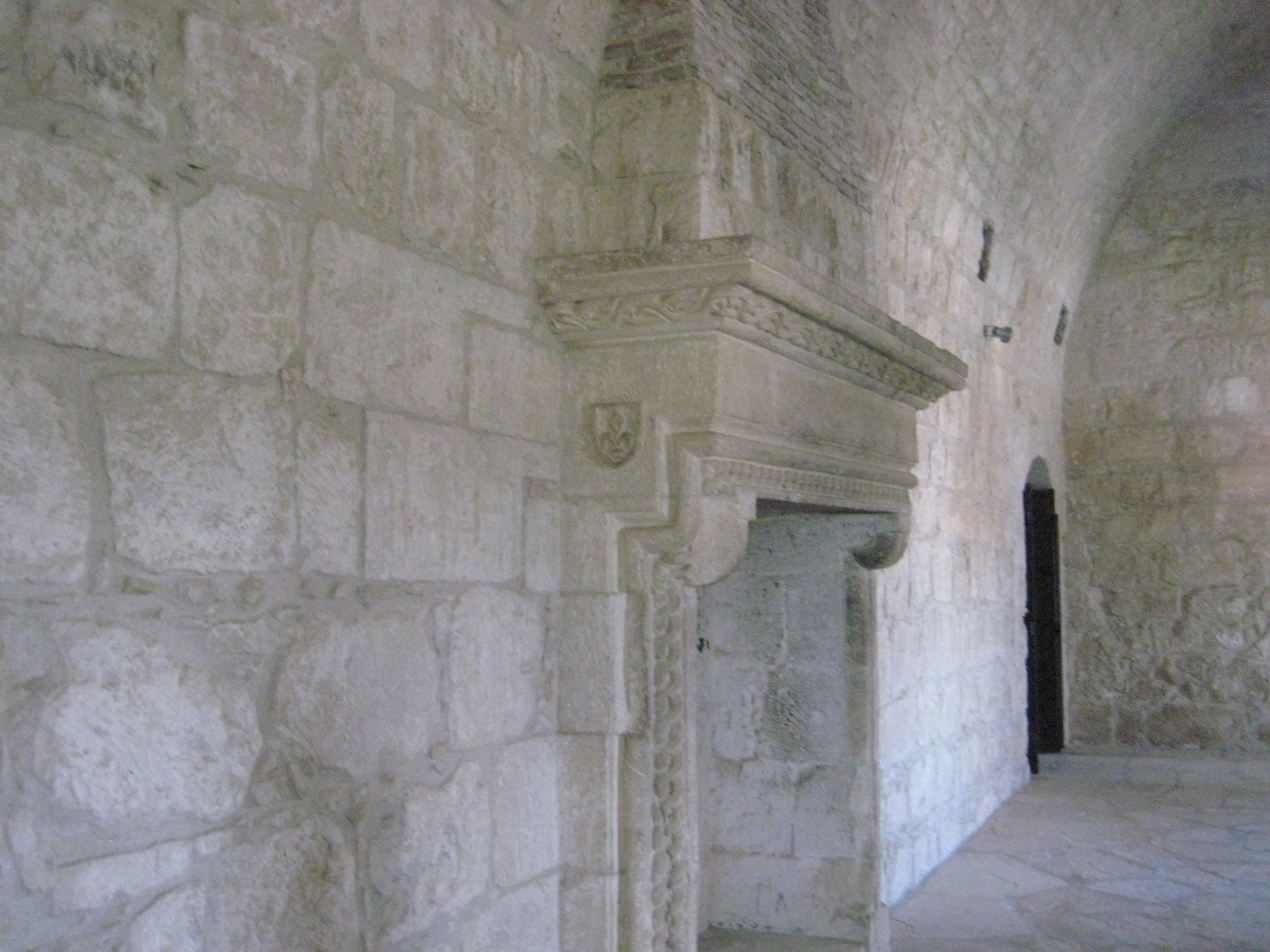
Fireplace, with lily (fleur-de-lis) bas relief

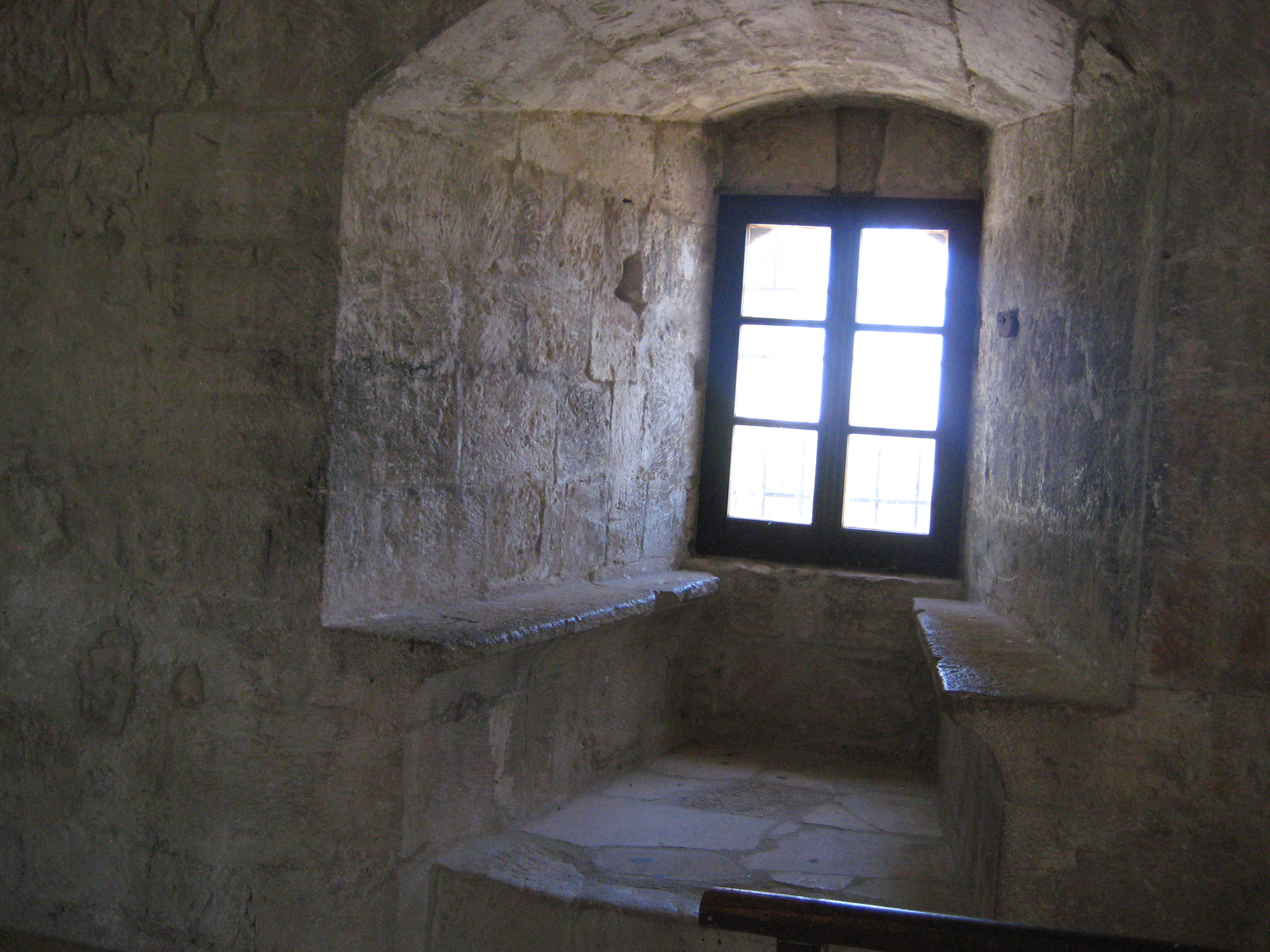
Ground-floor window

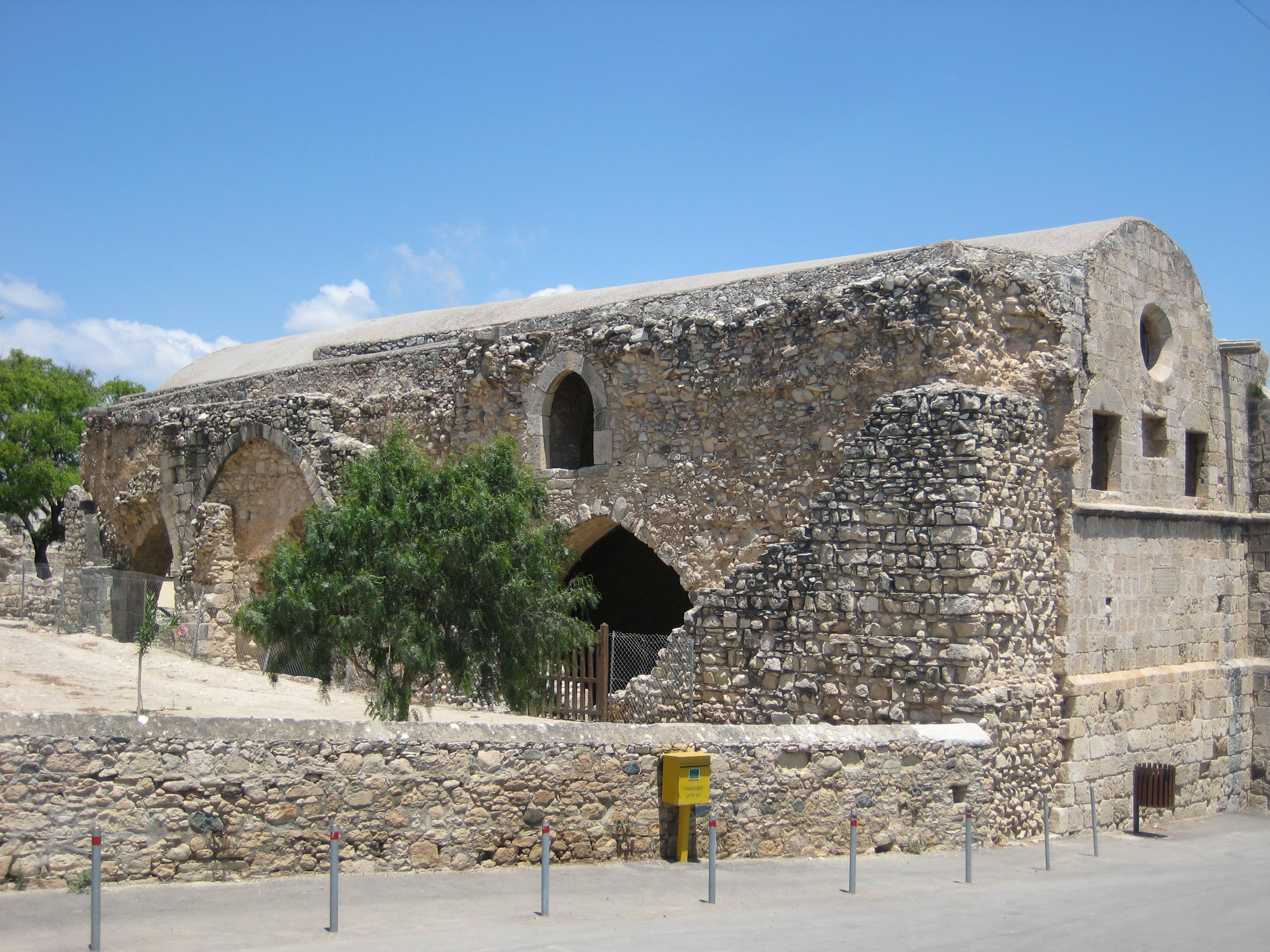
Ruins of sugar factory

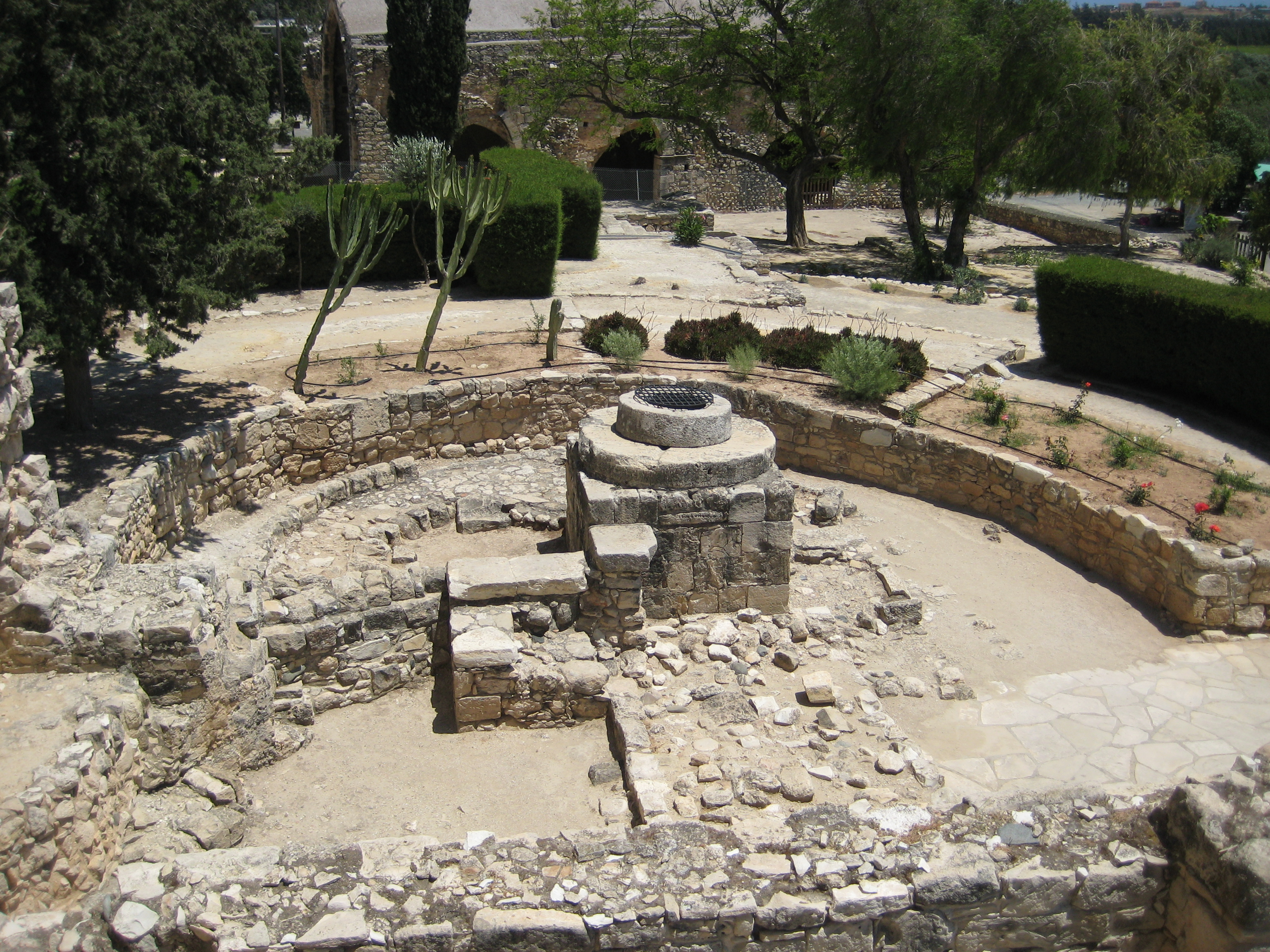
Castle ruins

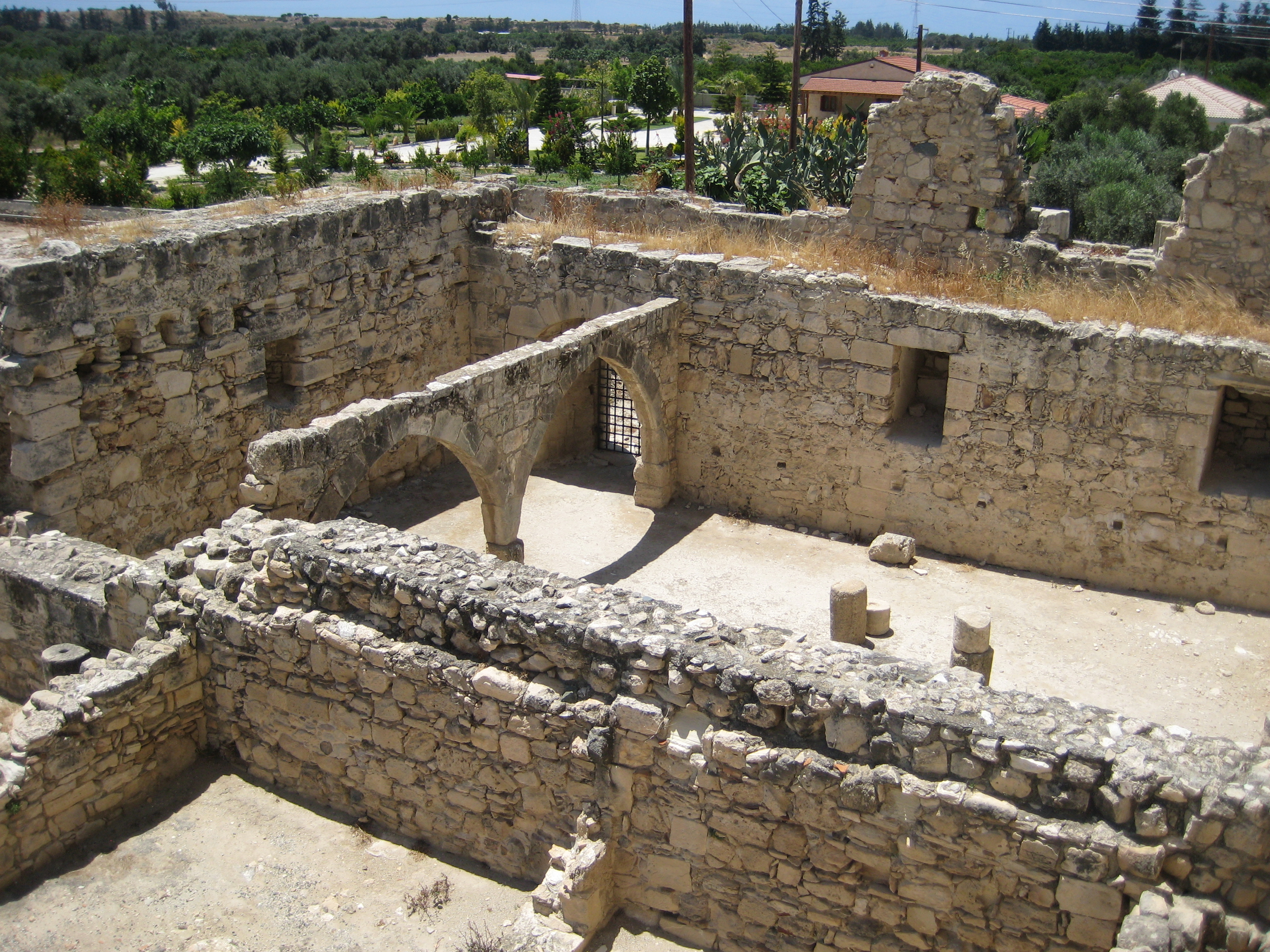
Castle ruins

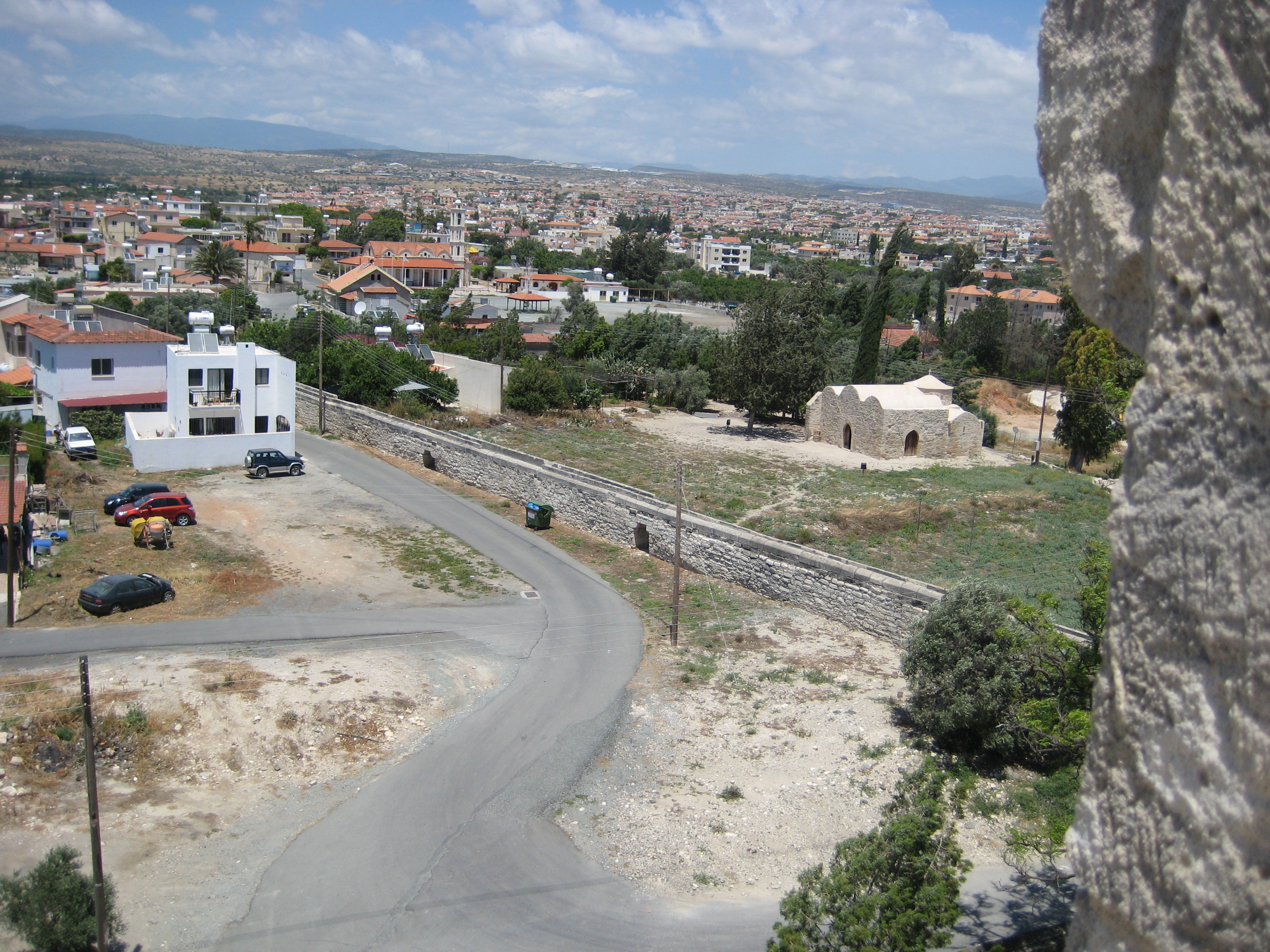
View from top of castle

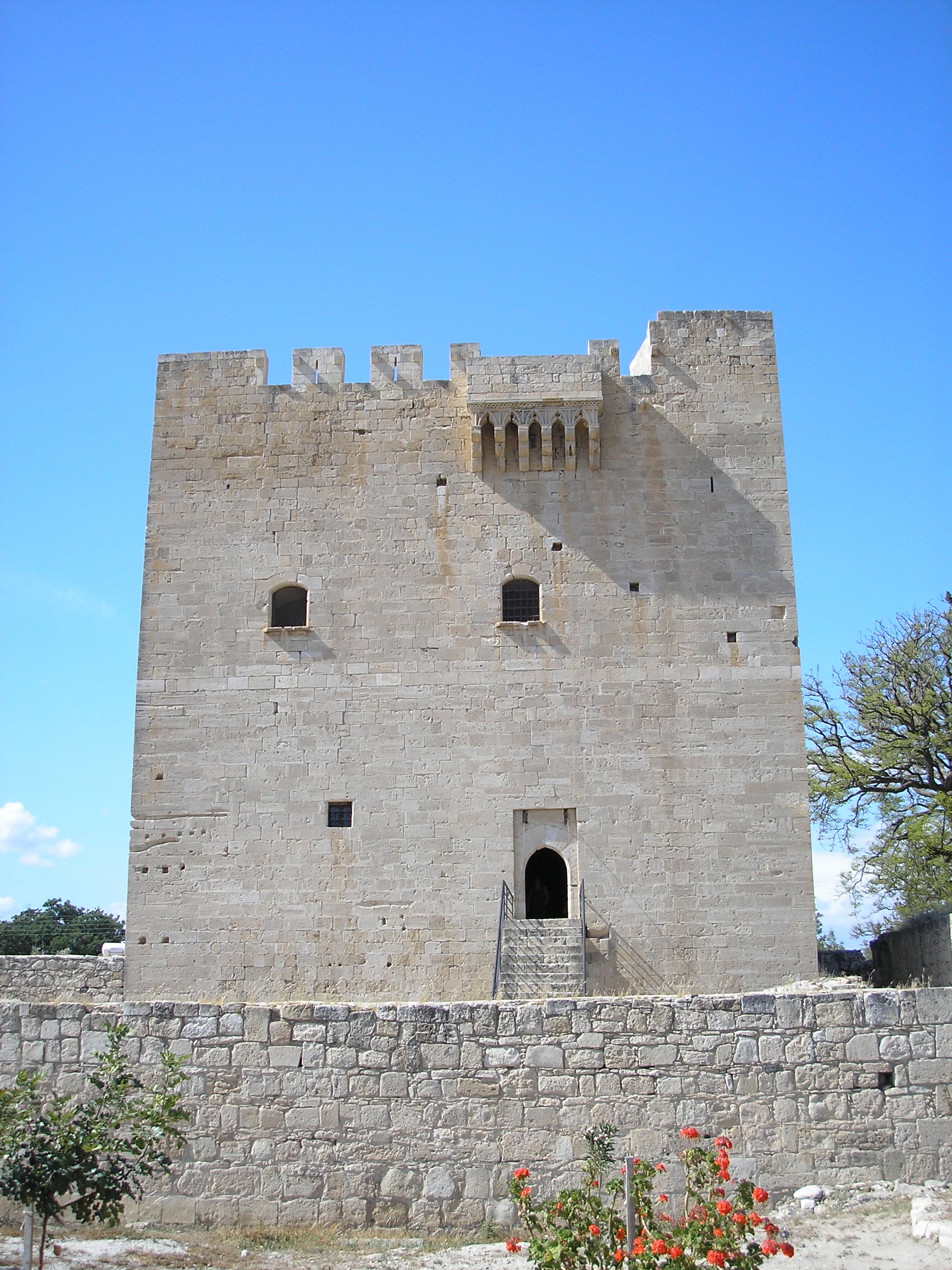
Southeast view of castle

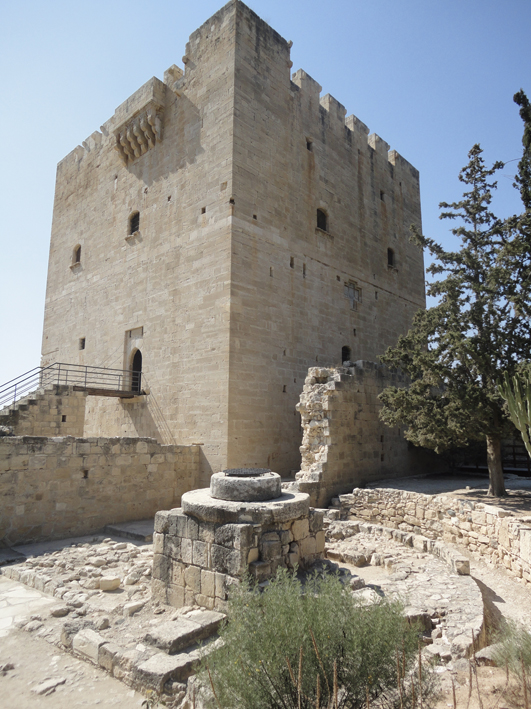
Southeast view of castle

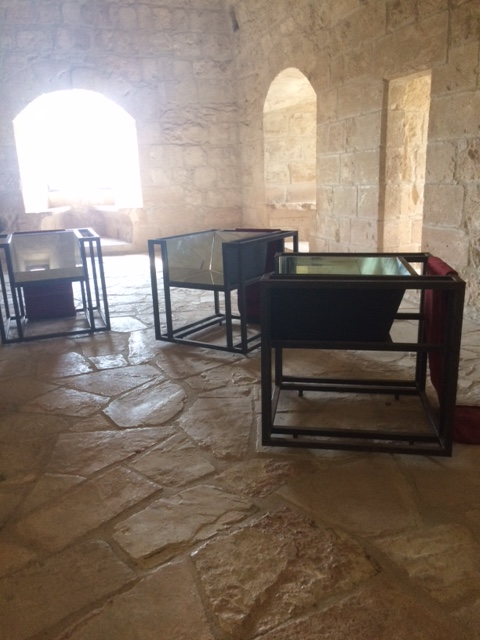
Main chamber

== See also ==
- List of Crusader castles
