= Château de Montaiguillon =

Ruined castle in France

Coordinates: 48°37′55″N 3°30′0″E

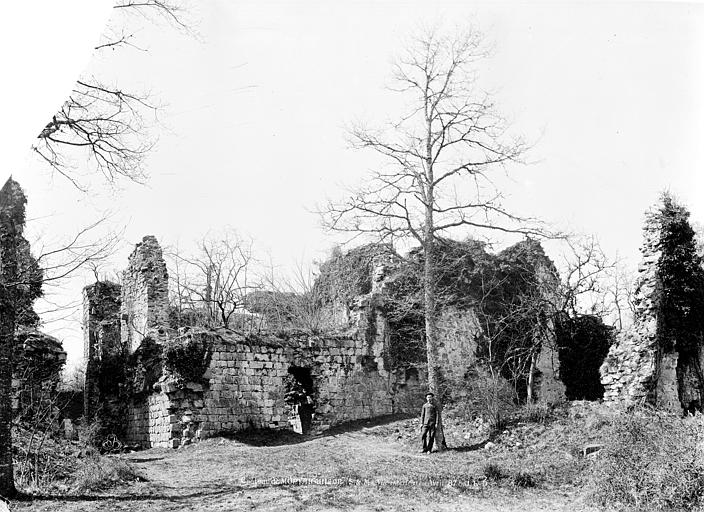
The ruins of Château de Montaiguillon

The Château de Montaiguillon is a ruined castle in the commune of Louan-Villegruis-Fontaine in the Seine-et-Marne département of France.

The castle dates from the 12th century. Partially ruined and abandoned, it is privately owned. It has been listed since 1875 as a monument historique by the French Ministry of Culture.

== See also ==
- List of castles in France
