= Condor of Cornwall =

Legendary Cornish nobleman

Attributed arms of Condor, from the Book of Baglan (1600–1607)

Condor (also Candorus, Cadoc and other variants) was a legendary Cornish nobleman. The first known mentions of Condor are from heralds and antiquarians in the late sixteenth century, who recorded claims that he had been earl of Cornwall at the time of the Norman Conquest in 1066, and paid homage to William the Conqueror to keep his position. William Hals speculated that he may have supported the rebels at the Siege of Exeter (1068) and lost his earldom; much of Cornwall was given to William's Breton supporters soon afterwards. Condor's son Cadoc may have regained the title under Henry I, and later passed it through his daughter to Reginald de Dunstanville.

== History ==
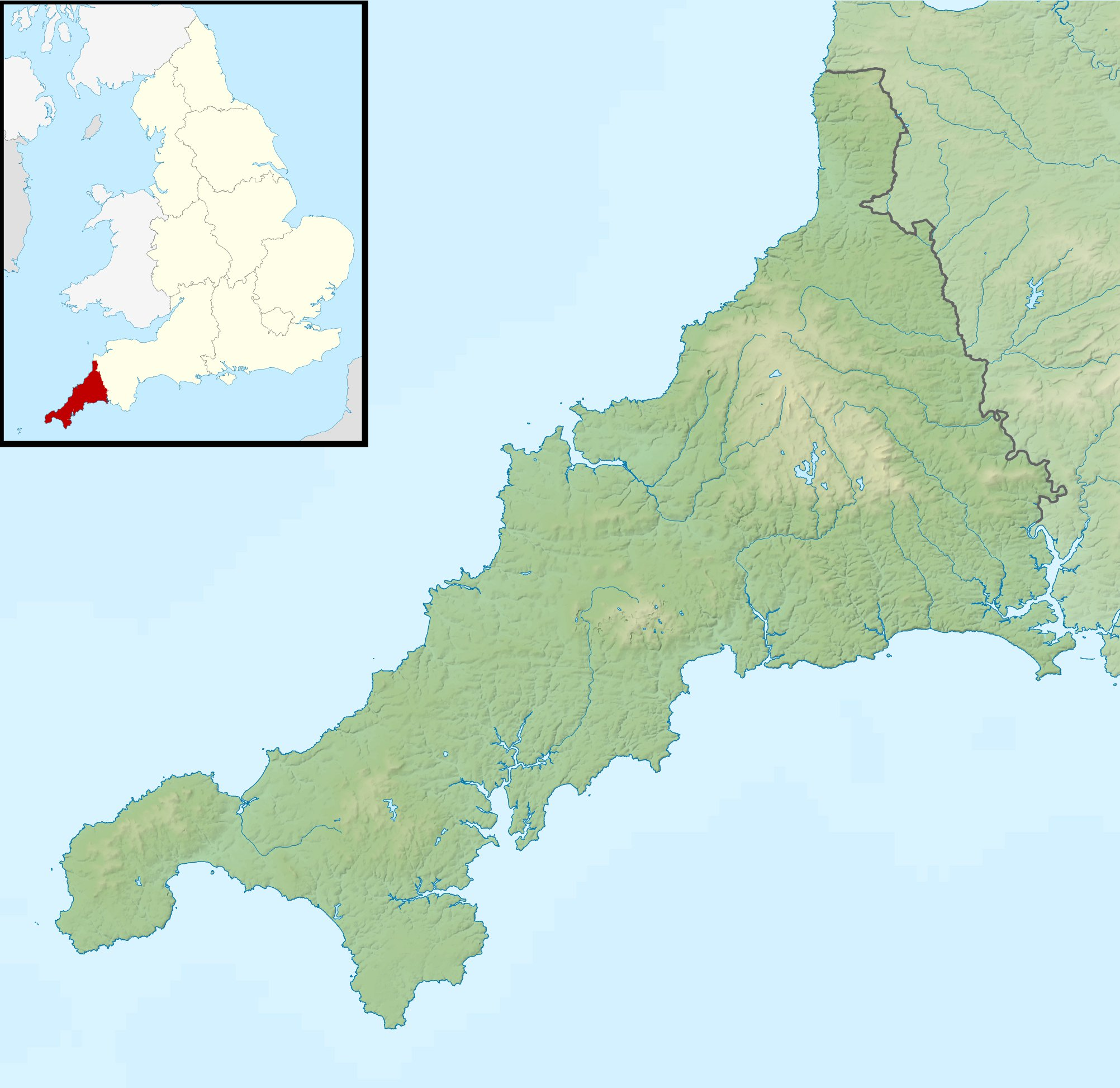
Locations in Cornwall associated with Condor

According to William Hals, writing in the eighteenth century, Condor may have been born in St Clement, or perhaps lived there. Hals also associates the Intsworth peninsula in St Anthony parish, the Condura and Tregarne manors in St Keverne parish, and Trematon manor with Condor. Early nineteenth century Cornish historian Richard Polwhele calls Launceston, Tintagel, and Trematon castles the residences of Condor and the ancient earls of Cornwall. Sixteenth century herald Robert Glover described Condor as being "ex Regio sanguine Britannorum" ('from the royal blood of the Britons'), while William Borlase, writing in the eighteenth century, said that Condor was "descended from a long train of Ancestors, sometime called Kings, sometime Dukes, and Earls of Cornwall". A sixteenth century armory even refers to Condor as "Erle of Devon". Some modern sources connect Condor with the last recorded king of Cornwall, Donyarth (died 875), and assert that Condor was his direct descendant.

Glover, and antiquaries Richard Carew and John Williams write that Condor was briefly appointed as the first Count (according to Glover) or Earl of Cornwall by William the Conqueror after the Norman Conquest of England, after paying homage to William for his earldom. Hals suggests that Condor may have supported the rebels at the Siege of Exeter in 1068 and lost his earldom as a result; William did travel to Cornwall following the siege in a show of strength. Brian of Brittany fought for the Normans at the siege, and was rewarded with lands in Devon and Cornwall; The Complete Peerage states that he received Cornwall and west Devon when they were taken by the Normans. (Note: Brian "is often considered to have been Earl of Cornwall" though the first record of this claim is in 1140 by his nephew Alan, which may just have been Alan's attempt to strengthen the legitimacy of his own claim to the title.) Brian was probably deposed after the revolt of the Earls in 1075, and his lands in Cornwall given to William's half-brother Robert, Count of Mortain who owned virtually all of Cornwall by the time of Domesday in 1086. (Note: Robert was often referred to informally as Earl of Cornwall in contemporary records, but was never given this title.)

When Robert's son William, Count of Mortain rebelled against King Henry I in 1104 his lands were stripped, and, according to McKenzie, Woolwater, and Polwhele, they may have been restored to Condor's son, Cadoc. Hooker, Carew, Williams, and Hals all write that Cadoc had one daughter and heir, called Hawisia, Avicia, Alicia, Amicia, Agnes, or Beatrix, (Note: Reginald had a mistress called Beatrice de Vaux (the daughter of Hubert I de Vaux) with whom he had several illegitimate children, including Henry Fitzcount.) who married Reginald de Dunstanville. Williams and Hals say that through her, Reginald claimed the title Earl of Cornwall, which he was later formally invested with by his half-sister Empress Matilda, after it was taken by Alan of Richmond during the Anarchy.

== Name ==
Condor's name is not certain, with Carew giving both his and his son's names as Condor, but noting that Camden referred to him as Cadoc. Camden's first editions of Britannia give his name as Cadocus, but from 1607 he revised that to "Candorus, called by others Cadocus" (Candorus alias Cadocus). Williams gives both his and his son's names as Candor. Hals gives his name as Cundor or Condor, and Condorus/Condurus/Condura in Latin, and his son as Cad-dock/Caddock/Cradock or Condor the Second. Frederick Lyde Caunter gives Contor as a variant spelling.

Hals wrote that the name Condor was in all probability taken from a place in St Clement called Conor or Condura, which Davies Gilbert says means 'the King or Prince's Water'. William Pryce instead suggested that the place name (which he gives as Condurra or Condourra) comes from con-dower 'the neck of water'. John Bannister gives Condora as possibly being from 'the head' (cean) 'between the two waters' (dourau), and Condurra/Condurrow as 'druid's down', 'the neck of water', or possibly 'oak' (deru) 'down' (goon).

Pryce suggests the meaning of the name Cadoc derives from Cad 'war', Cadwr 'a soldier' or 'a champion', and Cadgur 'a man of war'. Hals translates it as meaning to 'bear or carry-war'. Craig Weatherhill gives the meaning of Cadoc as 'man of battle'. Bannister says that the name Cadoc means 'warlike' (like the Welsh cadwg), while Cradock means 'beloved' (like the Welsh caradog).

== Early sources ==
Attributed arms of Condor, from Camden's Britannia (1610 edition)

Attributed arms of Condor's son Cadoc, from Hals' History of Cornwall (c. 1750)

The Names of the Gentlemen of Devonshire and Cornwall, with their Arms, a sixteenth century armory, lists:

Condor, Erle of Devon: Sa: besanted or.

Robert Glover's manuscript "De Ducibus Cornubiæ" (c. 1568–1588) mentions:

Hawisia, the only daughter and heir of Candor from the royal blood of the Britons, count of Cornwall at the time of the Conquest, and who rendered homage and fidelity to King William the Conqueror for the said county.

In Britannia (1586–1610), William Camden wrote:

As for the Earles, none of British blood, are mentioned but onely Candorus (called by others Cadocus) who is accounted by the late writers, the last Earle of Cornwall, of British race, & as they which are skilfull in Heraldry, have a tradition, bare XV. Besaunts V. IIII. III. II. and I. in a shield Sable. (Note: Camden's Latin first edition of Britannia (1586) gives Condor's name as Cadocus, and in the attributed arms only states globulis aureis distinctum ('distinct golden globes') without specifying how many. The 1607 edition names Condor Candorus alias Cadocus ('Candorus, called by others Cadocus'), and changes the attributed arms to have XV. globulis inspersum ('fifteen sprinkled globes') instead. The translation given in this article is from the 1610 first English edition, by Philemon Holland, which Camden contributed to; this section is very close to Camden's 1607 version, only adding the number of bezants on each line.)

John Hooker's manuscript "The Stem of the Earls and Dukes of Cornwall" (c. 1587–1601) states:

Reynold Earl of Bristowe, the base son of King Henry the First, married Amicia, the daughter and heir of Condor Lord of Bradninch and Earl of Cornwall; and after the death of the said Earl, Reynold, in the right of his wife, was Lord of Bradninch and Earl of Cornwall, and they had issue a son named Henry, and a daughter named Joan. Henry joined his father in incorporating the town and borough of Bradninch, but died before his father without issue; and for want of issue male, the barony and earldom returned to the Crown. Condor, the last Earl of Cornwall of British extraction, bore for his arms ten bezants on a field sable, which Earl Reynold took and quartered with his own, viz. Gules, two lions passant or, a bend sinister azure.

In his Survey of Cornwall (1602), the antiquary Richard Carew wrote:

What time William the bastard subdued this Realme, one Condor possessed the Earledome of Cornwall, and did homage for the same: he had issue another Condor, whose daughter and heire Agnes, was maried to Reignald Earle of Bristowe, base sonne to King Henry the first. This note I borrowed out of an industrious collection, which setteth downe all the noble mens creations, Armes, and principall descents, in euery Kings dayes since the conquest: but master Camden, our Clarentieulx, nameth him Cadoc, and saith farther, that Robert Morton, brother to William Conquerour, by his mother Herlot, was the first Earle of Norman blood, and that his sonne William succeeded him; who taking part with Duke Robert, against Henry the first, thereby got captiuity, and lost his honour, with which that King inuested the forementioned Reignald.

In the Book of Baglan (1600–1607), John Williams wrote:

Candor, a brittan, was at the Conq. tyme E. of Cornewal and did homag to the conq. w^{m} for his Earldom, and had issue a sone named Candor who was 2 E. of Cornwall next after the Conquest. Candor had a da. & h. called Avicia ma. to Raynold, E. of Bristow, and in her right was E. of Cornewall; beareth S., 10 beausants o., 4, 3, 2, 1.

In his History of Cornwall (c. 1750), William Hals wrote:

In this church town [St Clement's] is the well-known place of Conor, Condura, id est, the King or Prince's Water (viz. Cornwall), whose royalty is still over the same, and whose lands cover comparatively the whole parish; from which place in all probability was denominated Cundor or Condor, in Latin Condorus, i. e. Condura, Earl of Cornwall at the time of the Norman Conquest, who perhaps lived, or was born here. And moreover, the inhabitants of this church town and its neighbourhood will tell you, by tradition from age to age, that here once dwelt a great lord and lady called Condura.

This Condurus, as our historians tell us, in 1016 [sic] submitted to the Conqueror's jurisdiction, paid homage for his earldom, and made an oath of his fealty to him; but this report doth not look like a true one, for most certain it is, in the 3rd year of the Conqueror's reign, he was deprived of his earldom, the same being given to the Conqueror's half-brother, Robert Earl of Morton in Normandy, whose son William for a long time succeeded him in that dignity after his death. Is it not, therefore, more probable that this Earl Condurus confederated with his countrymen at Exeter, in that insurrection of the people against the Conqueror in the 3rd year of his reign, and for that reason was deprived of his earldom? Be it as it was, certain it is he married and had issue Cad-dock (id est, bear or carry-war), his son and heir, whom some authors call Condor the Second, who is by them taken for and celebrated as Earl of Cornwall.

But what part of the lands or estate thereof he enjoyed (whilst Robert and William, Earls of Morton aforesaid, his contemporaries, for thirty years were alive, and doubtless possessed thereof, as well as his title and dignity) hath not yet appeared to me. His chief dwelling and place of residence was at Jutsworth, near Saltash and Trematon, where he married and had issue one only daughter named Agnes, as some say, others Beatrix, who was married to Reginald Fitz-Harry, base son of King Henry I., by his concubine Anne Corbett, in whose right he was made Earl of Cornwall, after William Earl of Cornwall aforesaid had forfeited the same, by attainder of treason against the Conqueror and his sons, and was deprived thereof.

This Earl Caddock, or Condor the 2nd, departed this life 1120, and lies buried in the chancel of St. Stephen's Church, by Saltash, and gave for his arms, in a field Sable, 15 bezants palewise, 4, 4, 4, 2, 1.

William Borlase wrote in The Antiquities of Cornwall (1754):

For when the Conquerour came in, the last Earl of Cornwall of British blood (by some called Candorus; by Camden, Cadocus) descended from a long train of Ancestors, sometime called Kings, sometime Dukes, and Earls of Cornwall, was displaced, and his Lands as well as Honours given to Robert Earl of Moreton; and it is natural to think that, where the Residence of those ancient Earls of Cornwall was, there he occasionally fixed his Court, as at Lanceston, Tindagel, and Trematon. Mr. Carew, in his Survey gives us this account of an ancient Monument found in the parish Church of St. Stephen, to which this Castle belongs. "I have received information (he says) from one averring eye witness, that about fourscore years since, there was digged up in the parish chancel, a leaden coffin, which, being opened, shewed the proportion of a very big man. The partie farder told me, how a writing, graved in the lead, expressed the same to be the burial of a Duke, whose heir was married to the Prince, but who it should be, I cannot devise; albeit, my best pleasing conjecture lighteth upon Orgerius, because his daughter was married to Edgar." Now this Orgerius was Duke of Cornwall, A. D. 959 and might probably have lived at Trematon Castle in this parish; but he was buried in the monastery of Tavistock (as W. of Malmsbury says), so that probably the Duke of Cornwall buried here was Cadoc, hereafter mentioned. Farther of this Castle, before the Conquest, I have not yet seen. Under Robert, Earl of Moreton and Cornwall, it appears by the Exeter Domesday, that Reginald de Valletorta held the Castle; but the inheritance came to William Earl of Cornwall, from whom it passed by attainder to the crown, with his other lands and dignities; then, as some think, Cadoc, son of the Condorus above-mentioned, was restored to the Earldom of Cornwall, lived and died at the Castle of Trematon, leaving one only daughter and heir, Agnes, married to Reginald Fitz-Henry, natural son to Henry I. I conjecture, therefore, that this Cadoc must be that Duke (or rather Earl) of Cornwall, whose sepulchre was discovered as above, his daughter being married to a Prince of the Royal Blood.

== Claimed descent from Condor ==
The Liskeard lawyer Frederick Lyde Caunter reports that John the Chanter, Bishop of Exeter from 1184–1190, was said to be a great-grandson of Condor.

Caunter also states that "There has always been a legend in the family that the Devonshire Caunters are descended from Condor, sometimes written 'Contor', Earl of Cornwall". Caunter goes on to cite Charles Broughton, the author of a nineteenth century manuscript, Origin of the family of Caunter in Devonshire & Canter in Cornwall. Broughton, an Under-Secretary at the Foreign Office and apparently a friend of Richard MacDonald Caunter, wrote that "the Caunter family part of whom settled in Devonshire & part in Cornwall, are descended from Condor" and that Condor's descendants "in the direct line settled in that part of the County called 'the South Hams', & a younger branch retired to a more remote part of the County of Cornwall". Caunter adds, however, that he was unable to find confirmation for Broughton's statements.

Richard Charnock noted the Cornish surname Condor/Condura/Cundor in connection with Condor of Cornwall, but concluded that the name is derived from the place in St Clement parish.

== See also ==
- Cornish heraldry
- Higher Condurrow
