= Insworke =

Coordinates: 50.353°N 4.212°W

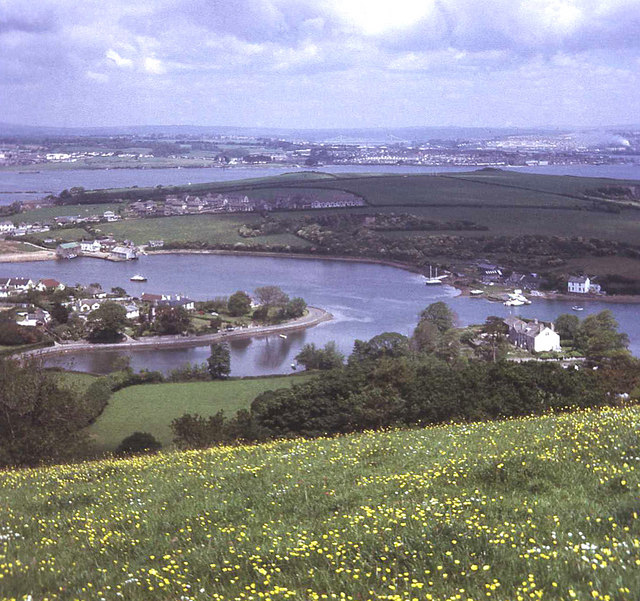
- View north from Maker Heights: below is Millbrook Lake with Foss Point splitting its headwaters to the left and Insworke village on the opposite side; St John's Lake, Torpoint and the Tamar Road Bridge are beyond

- Location within Cornwall
- OS grid reference: SX427526
- Unitary authority: Cornwall
- Ceremonial county: Cornwall
- Region: South West
- Country: England
- Sovereign state: United Kingdom
- Post town: Torpoint
- Postcode district: PL10

Insworke is a hamlet in the parish of Millbrook (before 1869 in the parish of Maker) in southeast Cornwall, England, UK. A fair and annual market were held here from 1319.

Antiquary William Hals wrote:

In this parish or manor, as I take it, stands Intsworh, alias Inis-worth, synonymous words signifying an island of worth, price, or value, viz. a peninsular formed by rivers of water, which leaves between them an angled or three-cornered promontory of land, called in British inis, signifying the same as amnicus mediamnis in Latin. This place, before the Norman Conquest, was the land of Condura and Cradock, Earls of Cornwall, by one of whose daughters or granddaughters, Agnes, it came by marriage to Reginald Fitz-Harry, base son of King Henry I. by Anne Corbet; who, in her right, long after William Earl of Cornwall, of the Norman race, forfeited the same to the King by attainder of treason, was made Earl thereof, from whose heirs it passed to the Dunstanvills and Valletorts; and by Valletort's daughter Joan, the widow of Sir Alexander Oakston, Knt. who turned concubine to Richard Earl of Cornwall, King of the Romans, who had by her a sole daughter named Joan, married to Richard Champernowne, a second son of Sir Champernowne, of Clift Champernowne, in Devon, in whose posterity it remained till Henry VII.'s days, when, his issue male failing, his three daughters and heirs were married to Monk, Fortescue, and Trevillian, from some of whose heirs it came by purchase to Edward Nosworthy, Esquire, Member of Parliament for Saltash, son of Edward Nosworthy, merchant and shopkeeper in Truro, temp. Charles II. who married Hill of that place, as his son aforesaid did Maynard and Jennings.
