= Trematon Castle =

Norman castle in Cornwall, England

- Kastel Tremen
- Saltash, Cornwall
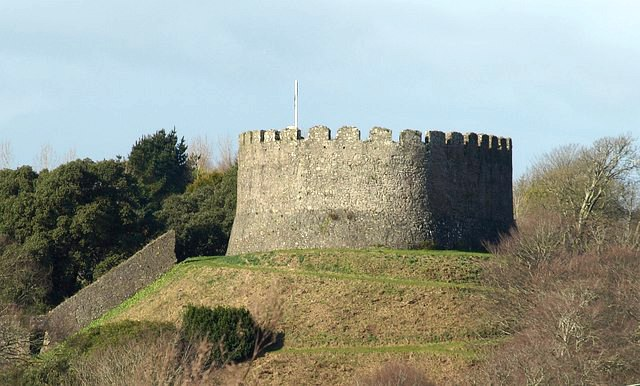
- Trematon Castle

Site information
- Type: Shell keep with bailey
- Condition: Ruined

Location
- Shown within Cornwall.
- Location within Cornwall
- Coordinates: 50°24′02″N 4°14′16″W

Scheduled monument
- Official name: Trematon Castle, a shell keep built on a motte and bailey castle
- Designated: 20 May 1960
- Reference no.: 1004384

Listed Building – Grade II*
- Official name: Higher Lodge at Trematon Castle
- Designated: 22 November 1982
- Reference no.: 1140409

Trematon Castle (Cornish: Kastel Tremen) is situated near Saltash in Cornwall, England, United Kingdom. It was the caput of the feudal barony of Trematon. It is similar in style to the later Restormel Castle, with a 12th-century keep. Trematon Castle overlooks the River Lynher and was built probably by Robert, Count of Mortain on the ruins of an earlier Roman fort: it is a motte-and-bailey castle and dates from soon after the Norman Conquest. It occupies a sentinel position one and a half miles south-east of Trematon village (grid reference SX41065801).

== Description ==
Trematon Castle, like Restormel Castle, has a stone shell keep raised on an earlier motte. Although in ruins, much of the Norman walls remain standing, so that the original form of the Castle and keep are clear. The keep is oval and has walls 10 feet thick and 30 feet high. The internal diameter is approximately 21 metres. A rectangular gatehouse, built in 1270, has two floors and a portcullis. Both are in good condition.

The military historian Sir Charles Oman said of the castle's situation "Trematon is high aloft, on one of the summits of the rather chaotic group of hill-tops which lie behind Saltash and its daring modern bridge."

Within the castle courtyard stands a Georgian house built in about 1808. This has four reception rooms and six main bedrooms, as well as servants' quarters. Part of the original castle wall was demolished to give this house a view into the surrounding countryside.

== History ==
The site of Trematon Castle predates the Norman Conquest. James McKenzie writes that an earthwork fortress on the site belonged to the earls of Cornwall, while historian William Woolwater calls it an "ancient palace of the Cornish Kings", built before 959. Cornish historian Richard Polwhele called it one of the residences of Condor of Cornwall and the "ancient earls of Cornwall", along with Launceston and Tintagel castles, and said that it was built before the Conquest. It was either bestowed by William the Conqueror to his half-brother Robert, Count of Mortain, or as Oman says, was established here by Robert soon after the Norman Conquest.

By the time of Domesday in 1086, it was owned by Robert, and its lord was Reginald de Vautort. Polwhele said that Cadoc of Cornwall may have been restored to the earldom of Cornwall after Robert's son William rebelled in 1104, and Cadoc may have lived and died there. In any case, the Vautorts were still lords of Trematon in 1166, and according to the Cartae Baronum held 59 knight's fees from the Earl of Cornwall, and one fee in-chief.

From the Conquest until 1270, the rights for the ferry from Saltash Passage on the Plymouth side of the River Tamar to Saltash also belonged to the Vautorts. When Roger de Vautort sold Trematon Castle and manor to Richard Earl of Cornwall, the rent was paid to the Earl's bailiff. In the thirteenth century, this amounted to nearly seven pounds sterling.

The Castle has remained the property of the Earls and Dukes of Cornwall without interruption since 1270, when Earl Richard bought it for £300.

Before the Duchy of Cornwall was created as an annex to the English crown in 1337, Trematon was one of four principal residences of the earls of Cornwall, along with Launceston, Restormel, and Liskeard castles.

In 1542, antiquary John Leland wrote: "The greaunt and auncient Castelle of Tremertoun is upon a Rokky Hille; wherof great peaces yet stond, and especially the Dungeon. The Ruines now serve for a prison. Great Liberties long to this Castelle."

When Sir Francis Drake returned from his circumnavigation voyage in 1580, he came into harbour in Plymouth, then slipped out to anchor behind St Nicholas Island until word came from Queen Elizabeth's Court for the treasures he had gathered to be stored in Trematon Castle. The hoard consisted of gold, silver, and precious stones, mainly emeralds, the result of piracy from Spanish ships along the west coast of South America. Before being moved for storage in the Tower of London, the treasure was temporarily stored in the Golden Hinde.

In 1961 the Duchy of Cornwall advertised the Castle to be let on a full repairing lease for 21 years, with breaks, at a rent of £250 a year. It subsequently became the home in Cornwall of Hugh Foot, Lord Caradon, and his son Paul Foot, a campaigning journalist, spent some of his youth there.

Queen Elizabeth II visited the Castle on 25 July 1962 accompanied by the Lord Lieutenant of Cornwall, Sir Edward Bolitho, before driving to Fowey and embarking in the royal yacht Britannia.

In 2012 the castle and grounds were leased from the Duchy of Cornwall by the landscape designers Julian and Isabel Bannerman, who created a garden there. In 2019 the lease was bought by interior designers Frieda Gormley and Javvy M Royle, co-founders of House of Hackney, who ran the castle as a pop-up hotel and redesigned the interiors.

== See also ==
- Castles in Great Britain and Ireland
- List of castles in England
- Ince castle
