= Trematon =

Village in Cornwall, England

Coordinates: 50.41°N 4.24°W

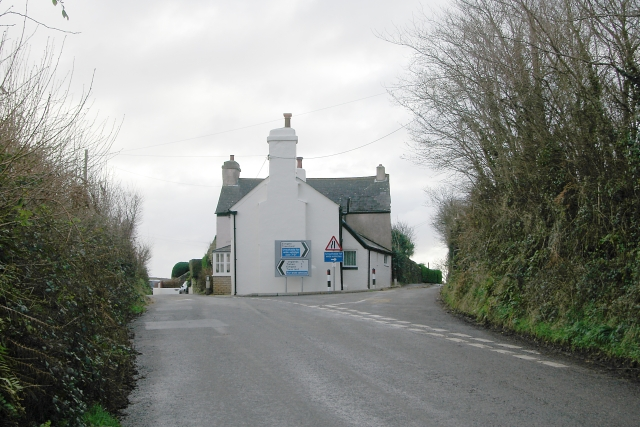
- A road junction

- Location within Cornwall
- Civil parish: St Stephens-by-Saltash
- Unitary authority: Cornwall
- Ceremonial county: Cornwall
- Region: South West
- Country: England
- Sovereign state: United Kingdom
- Post town: Saltash
- Postcode district: PL12
- Dialling code: 01752
- Police: Devon and Cornwall
- Fire: Cornwall
- Ambulance: South Western
- UK Parliament: South East Cornwall

Trematon is a village in Cornwall, England, UK, accessible via the A38 and about two miles (3 km) from the town of Saltash and part of the civil parish of St Stephens-by-Saltash.

== History ==
Trematon appears in the Domesday Book (1086) as the manor of "Tremetone", at 100 households it was one of the very largest settlements in Cornwall and West Devon, larger even than nearby St Germans.

William Camden says of Trematon

...you come to the Liver, a little river stored with oisters that runneth under S. Germans, a small towne... Some few miles from hence upon the same river standeth Trematon, bearing the name of a Castle, though the wall be halfe downe, in which, as we find in Domesday booke, William Earle of Moriton had his Castle and held his mercate, and was the capitall seat of the Baronie belonging to the Earles and Dukes of Cornwall, as we may see in the Inquisitions. When the Liver is past this Castle, neere unto Saltash, sometimes Esse... it runneth into the river Tamar, the bound of the whole country.

Trematon Castle, one and a half miles south-east of the village, stands in a sentinel position overlooking Plymouth Sound and dates from soon after the Norman Conquest. It is similar in style to Restormel, being a motte-and-bailey castle with a 12th-century keep. It was built on the ruins of an earlier Roman fort.

William Hals wrote that Caddock the son of Condor of Cornwall's "chief dwelling and place of residence was at Jutsworth, near Saltash and Trematon".

There was previously a Wesleyan Methodist chapel at Trematon.

There is a Cornish cross at a road junction between the village and the castle.

== Present day ==
Trematon Castle exists to this day and can be visited. Trematon is left of Trehan and approx 25 minutes from Tamar Bridge. Trematon Hall, a Private Georgian Period country house is set in twenty-five acres of grounds. The village also has a pub called the Crooked Inn.

== See also ==
- Feudal barony of Trematon
