= William Brewer (justice) =

13th-century English judge and administrator

Arms of Brewer: Gules, two bends wavy or

William Brewer (alias Briwere, Brigwer, etc.) (died 1226) of Tor Brewer in Devon, was a prominent administrator and judge in England during the reigns of kings Richard I, his brother King John, and John's son Henry III. He was a major landholder and the founder of several religious institutions. In 1204, he acquired the feudal barony of Horsley in Derbyshire.

== Biography ==
Brewer's ancestry is unclear, but he was probably the son of Henry Brewer and the grandson of William Brewer, Royal Forester of Bere, Hampshire, who founded the nunnery of Polsloe in Exeter. William Brewer, Bishop of Exeter, was one of his nephews.

He began his career as Forester of Bere, a hereditary title, and by 1179 had been appointed Sheriff of Devon. Under King Richard I (1189–1199) he was one of the justiciars appointed to administer the kingdom while the king was on the Third Crusade. He was present at Worms, Germany, in 1193 to aid in the negotiations for the ransom of King Richard. In about 1193 he began his career as a Baron of the Exchequer, an office that he exercised until the reign of King Henry III (1216–1272).

Under King John (1199–1216) Brewer was one of the most active figures in government, in terms of the number of royal charters he witnessed, together with Henry Marshal, Bishop of Exeter and Geoffrey FitzPeter, 1st Earl of Essex. During this period he was appointed Sheriff of Berkshire, Sheriff of Cornwall, Sheriff of Devon, Sheriff of Hampshire, Sheriff of Nottinghamshire and Derbyshire, Sheriff of Oxfordshire, Sheriff of Somerset and Dorset and Sheriff of Sussex and Sheriff of Wiltshire. He was often unpopular with the inhabitants of his counties, and the men of Cornwall, Somerset, and Dorset paid money to the king for his removal.

He founded and endowed three monasteries: Torre Abbey, which was sited within his manor of Tor Brewer in Devon, in 1196; Mottisfont Abbey in Hampshire in 1201; and Dunkeswell Abbey in Devon in 1201.

In 1224, he retired from the world to live as a Cistercian monk at Dunkeswell Abbey, where he died in 1226 and was buried with his wife before the high altar.

=== Marriage and children ===
Brewer married Beatrice de Vaux (died before 1220), (Latinised to de Vallibus, "from the valleys", the daughter of Hubert de Vaux and Grecia, who had been the mistress of Reginald de Dunstanville, 1st Earl of Cornwall (died 1175) and mother of Henry FitzCount (died 1221). Their children included:

- Richard (died 1213/5), who predeceased his father.
- William (died 1232), eldest surviving son and heir. He married Joan de Redvers, a daughter of William de Redvers, 5th Earl of Devon, but died childless, when his five sisters became his co-heiresses.
- Graecia, married Reginald de Braose (died 1227/8).
- Isabel, married Baldwin Wake (died 1213), feudal baron of Bourne, Cambridgeshire.
- Joan, married William de Percy, 6th Baron Percy (1197–1245), feudal baron of Topcliffe, Yorkshire. The wardship and marriage of William de Percy, who attained his majority of 21 in 1218, son of Henry de Percy (died 1198), had been acquired by her father.
- Alice, his fourth daughter, married twice. Her first marriage was to Reginald de Mohun (1185–1213) feudal baron of Dunster, of Dunster Castle in Somerset, and her second to William Paynel (died 1228), feudal baron of Bampton, Devon.
- Margaret (or Margery), married three times: firstly to William de la Ferté (died 1216), secondly to Eudo de Dammartin (died 1225), and thirdly to Geoffrey de Saye (died 1230) feudal baron of West Greenwich, Kent. Her moiety of the inheritance from her brother was subsequently annexed to the Duchy of Lancaster.

== Landholdings ==
Brewer was adept at acquiring lands, and obtained a substantial feudal barony from relatively humble beginnings. By 1219 he was assessed for scutage on over sixty knight's fees scattered over several shires.

According to Risdon, the lands of William Brewer in Devon formed a feudal barony, but this does not appear on the list of baronies given by Pole (died 1635), nor is it recognised by Sanders (1960). Risdon stated that Brewer held close to thirty knight's fees (usually synonymous with manors) in Devon, and that his barony ("honour") was "incorporated to the crown" together with the Dukedom of Lancaster, by King Henry IV. His Devonshire landholdings included:

- Buckland Brewer
- Tor Brewer, later called Tor Mohun, the inheritance of his daughter Alice, wife of Reginald de Mohun (1185–1213), and their descendants.
- Holsworthy, which descended to his daughter Margaret, wife of William de la Ferté (died 1216), and their descendants.
- Ugborough the inheritance of his daughter Alice, wife of Reginald de Mohun (1185–1213), and their descendants.
- Bradworthy He gave part of this manor to his foundation of Torre Abbey. The remainder was the inheritance of his daughter Alice.
- Wolborough, which he gave to his foundation of Torre Abbey.

== In popular culture ==
William Brewer is a possible original for the Sheriff of Nottingham in the Robin Hood legends. He was portrayed as one of King John's enforcers in the television series Robin of Sherwood (Episode: The Time Of The Wolf, written by Richard Carpenter, 1985), played by John Harding. He also appeared as a minor character in Richard Kluger's 1992 novel The Sheriff of Nottingham, and he is mentioned in Wilson Harp's 2013 novel The Ghost of Sherwood as the High Sheriff of Nottinghamshire, Derbyshire and the Royal Forests, but the acting sheriff in his name in the story is a fictional brother named Robert Brewer.
