= Antiqua maneria =

Original 17 manors belonging to the Earldom of Cornwall

The Antiqua maneria (ancient manors), also known as assessionable manors, were the original 17 manors belonging to the Earldom of Cornwall.

After March 1337, these manors were transferred to the new Duchy of Cornwall created by King Edward III to provide financial support to his son Edward, the Black Prince (1330–1376). These manors were referred to as assessionable manors because they were leased under assession leases, which were renewed periodically.

The table below shows the 17 Antiqua maneria, including the number and status of Customary tenants in the early fourteenth century. The manors vary greatly in both size and importance. The parishes listed are the modern parishes, rather than those that existed in the 14th century.

== Table of customary tenants in the early fourteenth century ==
Conventionarii = Conventionary tenants; Villani = Villeins; Nativi = Villeins; Liberi Conventionarii = Free tenants; Nativi Conventionarii = Conventionary tenants; Nativi de Stipite = Villeins by descent

Manor	1300		1327-32		1333-1340		
	Conventionarii	Villani	Conventionarii	Nativi	Liberi Conventionarii	Nativi Conventionarii	Nativi de Stipite
Calstock of Harewood House	14	53	–	–	29	49	8
Climsland	23	81	25	69	28	49	18
Helston in Kirrier	76	11	102	6	102	5	2
Helston in Trigg (Helstone in Lanteglos); and Penmayne	33	78	–	–	37	72	11
Liskeard	41	26	46	36	49	34	4
Moresk in St Clement parish	20	19	–	–	24	20	2
Penkneth in Lanlivery parish	9	6	–	–	7	3	7
Penlyne in Lostwithiel parish	22	2	–	–	20	1	1
Penmayne in St Minver parish	see	Helston in Trigg	–	–	–	–	–
Restormel in Lostwithiel parish	2	12	–	15	–	8	8
Rillaton in Linkinhorne parish	7	6	-	–	3	10	5
Talskiddy in St Columb Major parish	2	1	4	3	3	3	0
Tewington in Treverbyn parish	43	11	52	12	52	6	5
Tintagel (formerly Bossiney)	14	28	25	30	26	30	–
Trematon in St Stephens by Saltash parish	29	21	38	25	37	16	6
Tybesta, in Creed parish	28	21	37	16	36	14	4
Tywarnhaile in St Agnes parish	12	15	–	–	11	15	2

== See also ==
- Royal charters applying to Cornwall
