= Reginald de Dunstanville, Earl of Cornwall =

Illegitimate son of Henry I of England

Reginald de Dunstanville
- Earl of Cornwall; High Sheriff of Devon
- Born: c. 1100; Dénestanville, France
- Died: 1 July 1175 (aged 75); Chertsey, Surrey
- Spouse: Mabel FitzRichard
- Issue: Henry Fitzcount
- Father: Henry I of England
- Mother: Sybilla Corbet of Alcester

Reginald de Dunstanville (alias Reginald FitzRoy, Reginald FitzHenry, Rainald, etc.; French: Renaud de Donstanville or de Dénestanville; c. 1110 – 1 July 1175) was an Anglo-Norman nobleman and an illegitimate son of King Henry I (1100–1135). He became Earl of Cornwall and High Sheriff of Devon.

== Origins ==
Reginald was born in Dénestanville in the Duchy of Normandy, an illegitimate son of King Henry I (1100–1135) by his mistress Sybilla Corbet of Alcester who was a daughter and co-heiress of Sir Robert Corbet, lord of the manor of Alcester, Warwickshire, and wife (at some point) of "Herbert the King's Chamberlain".

== Career ==
Antiquaries Carew and Williams refer to Reginald as the Earl of Bristol, and with Hals report that he married Agnes (sometimes called Avicia, or Beatrix), granddaughter of Condor of Cornwall (the Earl of Cornwall at the time of the Conquest), and in her right was made Earl of Cornwall. According to Carew William Camden gave an alternative account, with Henry I investing Reginald as earl of Cornwall, after taking it from William, Count of Mortain who rebelled against him in 1104; however, Camden's own account has Henry II advancing Reginald to the position, while making preparations to fight Stephen.

During the war between Matilda and Stephen, Reginald, who supported Matilda, was in control of Cornwall. Subsequently, forced out of Cornwall by Stephen's forces, Reginald lost the earldom to Alan of Richmond. By 1141, Stephen's forces had been beaten and Reginald was invested with the Earldom of Cornwall by his half-sister Matilda in 1141. (Note: William of Malmesbury states Robert of Gloucester invested Reginald as Earl of Cornwall.) In about 1173 he granted a charter to his free burgesses of Truro in Cornwall and addressed his meetings at Truro to "All men both Cornish and English", suggesting a differentiation of nations. He served as Sheriff of Devon from 1173 to 1174.

== Marriage and progeny ==
Reginald married Mabel FitzWilliam, daughter of William FitzRichard, a substantial landholder in Cornwall, by whom he had the following progeny:

- Nicholas de Dunstanville (1136–1175), said to be illegitimate in some sources; had no known issue
- Hawyse (or Denise) de Dunstanville (1138 – 21 April 1162), wife of Richard de Redvers, 2nd Earl of Devon
- Maud (or Mathilda) FitzRoy de Dunstanville of Cornwall (b. 1143, Dunstanville, Kent, England), wife of Sir Robert de Beaumont, Count of Meulan
- Sarah (or Sara) de Dunstanville (b. 1147), wife of Ademar V, Viscount of Limoges

In addition, many authorities say he had a daughter, Ursula, who married Walter de Dunstanville, making Walter the baron of Castle Combe in her right. However, Robert William Eyton demonstrated that Castle Combe had belonged to the Dunstanville family before it was held by Reginald, that it was restored to Walter on Reginald's death, and that the documents given as evidence of Ursula's marriage were forgeries.

William Pole claimed that Reginald had another daughter, Joan, who married Roger de Valletort, but this is unproven, and Pole may well have been in error.

Albert A. Pomeroy's History and Genealogy of the Pomeroy Family (1912) assigns him two more daughters: Agnes de Cornwall who married Andre de Vitrei, and another Maud, who married Robert de Vere. These claims were included in The New Complete Peerage. However, no evidence is given for either, and they are likely to be among the several mistakes in the book.

=== Illegitimate progeny ===
Reginald also had illegitimate children by his mistress Beatrice de Vaux (also known as de Valle), the daughter of Hubert I de Vaux and later the wife of William Brewer:

- Henry FitzCount (d. 1222), Sheriff of Cornwall and Earl of Cornwall
- William FitzCount, nothing is known of him except his name
- John FitzCount, a godson of King John; became parson of Banbury

== Death and burial ==
Reginald died at Chertsey, Surrey, and was buried in Reading Abbey.

== Notes and references ==
=== Sources ===
- Baxter, Ron (2016). The Royal Abbey of Reading. The Boydell Press.
- Chibnall, Marjorie (1991). The Empress Matilda: Queen Consort, Queen Mother and Lady of the English. Basil Blackwell. ISBN 978-0-631-15737-3.
- Clark, Cecily (1995). Jackson, Peter (ed.). Words, Names, and History: Selected Writings of Cecily Clark. D.S. Brewer.
- Matthew, Donald (2002). King Stephen. Hambledon and London.
- de Pontfarcy, Yolande (1 October – 31 December 1995). "Si Marie de France était Marie de Meulan". Cahiers de Civilisation Médiévale (in French). 38 (152): 353–361. doi:10.3406/ccmed.1995.2630. ISSN 0007-9731 – via Persée.
- Powicke, F.M. (1933). "Loretta, Countess of Leicester". In Tait, James (ed.). Historical Essays in Honour of James Tait. Manchester University Press.
