= House of Hackney =

British clothing and interiors brand

Coordinates: 51.5266°N 0.0782°W

- Type: Private company
- Industry: Retail
- Genre: Brand
- Founded: 2011
- Founder: Javvy M Royle and Frieda Gormley
- Headquarters: London, United Kingdom,
- Products: Interior and apothecary goods
- Services: Interior design and herbalism
- Website: www.houseofhackney.com

House of Hackney is a luxury design house with a flagship store at St Michael's Clergy House, based in Shoreditch, London, and a showroom at the New York Design Center. The brand specialises in home and lifestyle goods and reinvents traditional designs and crafts. The company is B Corp certified and has a Mother Nature & Future Generations Directorship.

== History ==
House of Hackney was founded in London in 2011 by husband-and-wife team Frieda Gormley and Javvy M Royle, a former buyer for Topshop and product designer respectively. The bright colours of the brand's prints are inspired by Nature, Victorian ornamentation and William Morris. Products include wallpaper, fabric, paint, furniture and accessories, made in the United Kingdom where possible.

Along with a permanent space in Liberty and Bergdorf Goodman, House of Hackney opened its flagship store in Shoreditch in 2013. It was described by Time Out as "one of the most gorgeous retail establishments to land in London in years".

House of Hackney opened a new store space next to the Elizabeth Street Garden in New York in 2019.

In 2020, Gormley and Royle took on the stewardship of Trematon Castle in Cornwall, running it as a six-room bed and breakfast.

In January 2021, House of Hackney announced that they had been certified as a B Corporation for meeting the highest verified standards of social and environmental performance, transparency and accountability.. The brand recertified in January 2025 with a score of 109 points.

In March 2022, House of Hackney closed its Shoreditch High Street branch, and opened a new flagship store near to Old Street Station, at St Michael's Clergy House.

House of Hackney received a Queen's Award for Enterprise for International Trade in 2022, a King's Award for Sustainability in 2026, and is the subject of a Harvard Business School case study published in 2026.

In 2023, House of Hackney announced that the abstract concepts of Mother Nature and Future Generations had become directors on their board.

== See also ==
- Shoreditch High Street
