= Nicholas Halse =

Sir Nicholas Halse (also written as Hall and Hales; died 1636) was a landowner in Cornwall, England, governor of Pendennis Castle, an inventor, and a petitioner to Charles I of proposals for providing income for the treasury.

== Life ==
He was the son of John Halse or Halsey of Efford, near Plymouth. By 1596 he owned property in Cornwall. In that year or earlier, he married Grace, daughter of Sir John Arundell of Tolverne, and his wife Anne, daughter of Thomas Godolphin. The marriage connected him to families of the Cornish gentry. They had several children: his son James was the father of William Hals, known for his History of Cornwall.

He was knighted by James I at Greenwich on 22 May 1605, and in 1608 was made Governor of Pendennis Castle, in which capacity he approved of the foundation of the town of Falmouth. In 1608 and 1609 he addressed two discourses to James I on the Dutch fisheries on the English coast.

=== His invention, and petitions to Charles I ===
Halse invented an apparatus called a malt-kiln "for the dryinge of mault and hops with seacole, turffe, or any other fewell, without touching of smoake, and very usefull for baking, boyling, roasting, starchinge, and dryinge of lynnen, all at one and the same tyme and with one fyre". It was patented on 23 July 1635.

His name occurs many times as a petitioner to Charles I in 1634, 1635, and 1636 in connection with his invention, and also in connection with some proposals of his whereby his majesty might gain money to replenish the treasury and supplement the tax of ship money which was then being levied. He prays King Charles "to employ the first seven years' profit of the writer's invention of kilns for sweet-drying malt without touch of smoke". He suggests further that Charles should undertake to govern the Low Countries on behalf of the King of Spain, on consideration of an annual payment of £2 million by the latter, especially as the "Hollanders" had already become ungrateful and insolent to the English, and if not checked might soon keep the Newcastle coals from coming to London, and entirely deprive this country of the supply of cables, cordage, and other such matters.

In another petition, Halse estimates that his invention would save London alone £40,000 a year in wood and fuel, or £400,000 for all England and Ireland. In the following year, accordingly, an order dated Hampton Court, 11 June, directs that "malt-kilns erected by Halse be confirmed, and those by Page [his principal rival] be suppressed"; and 17 January 1637 "the assigns of Sir Nicholas Halse, deceased," petitioned the king "to take order for vacating all patents in prejudice to the grant to Sir N. Halse for the sole use of his new invented kilns".

During the same year a commission was appointed, dated 2 June, "to enquire whether Nicholas Page, clerk, or Sir Nicholas Halse was the first inventor of certaine kilns for the drying of malt"; and subsequent entries in the State Papers Collection (e.g. under 27 April) seem to establish the claims of the assigns of Halse.

== Posthumous volume ==
After Halse's death in 1636, his drafts of proposals were transcribed and edited into a manuscript volume, which was presented to the king by Francis Stewart, son of the Earl of Bothwell. It is now in the Egerton Collection (MS1140). It is entitled Great Britain's Treasure, unto the sacred majestie of the great and mightie monarch Charles the first of England, Scotland, France, and Ireland king, most humbly presenteth Francis Stewart — by whose loyall care the subsequent treatises have been painefully recollected out of the old papers and fragments of that worthy and lately deceased knight, your Majestie's faithfull and ingenuous servant, Sir Nicolas Halse, anno Domini 1636. There are five treatises, written in Old English character, and inscribed outside "Tibi soli O Rex Charissime".

The contents refer mainly to various revenues, giving Halse's estimate of the amount realised, and certain improvements that could be effected on behalf of the crown. King Charles is advised to increase his income "by ordaining, after the example of the King of France, that all foraigne shipps shall pay 15s. for eache tun" on landing. Another proposal is to grant "a Lease of 21 years of your Majesty's fishing unto the Hollenders". A treatise suggests the "coynage of Mundick and sinder Tinne" instead of the copper then current. Also proposed is the conversion "of 100,000 sturdie vagabonds and idle beggars" into "laborious and industrious tradesmen in the fishing craft". The book consists of 114 pages, followed by about forty unpaged, which contain an epilogue, several statistical notes, and a Medulla or abstract of the topics discussed.
