= Henry Fitzcount =

English nobleman

- Sheriff of Cornwall
- Died: 1222; Fifth Crusade

Henry Fitzcount (died 1222) was an English nobleman. He was the illegitimate son of Reginald de Dunstanville, 1st Earl of Cornwall. Dunstanville died with no legitimate heir and his earldom reverted to the crown upon his 1175 death. Fitzcount afterwards received several grants of land in Devon and Cornwall. A loyalist during the First Barons' War of 1215–17, he was appointed Sheriff of Cornwall in 1215. Fitzcount was stripped of the post within two months as he had assumed the title of Earl without the king's permission. John and Fitzcount reconciled and he was reappointed as sheriff in 1217, having also been granted farming rights across the whole of Cornwall. The grant of Cornwall was confirmed by John's successor Henry III but Fitzcount also incurred his displeasure and the county was taken into possession of the Crown in 1220. Fitzcount joined the Fifth Crusade around 1221 and died on that expedition in 1222.

== Biography ==
Henry Fitzcount was the illegitimate son of Reginald de Dunstanville, 1st Earl of Cornwall who was, in turn, an illegitimate son of King Henry I of England. Fitzcount's surname refers to his descent from the Earl, who administered the county of Cornwall. Dunstanville died without a legitimate heir in 1175 and his holdings in Cornwall, and the title of Earl, reverted to the Crown. Fitzcount was granted the manors of Kingskerswell and Diptford in Devon and Liskeard in Cornwall by an 1194 charter of Richard I of England.

In 1206, Fitzcount provided two ships to Richard's successor John in a cancelled expedition to recover Normandy from the French. Fitzcount received the barony of Totnes in Devon from John in 1209, it may have been seized by the king from Loretta de Braose, Countess of Leicester.

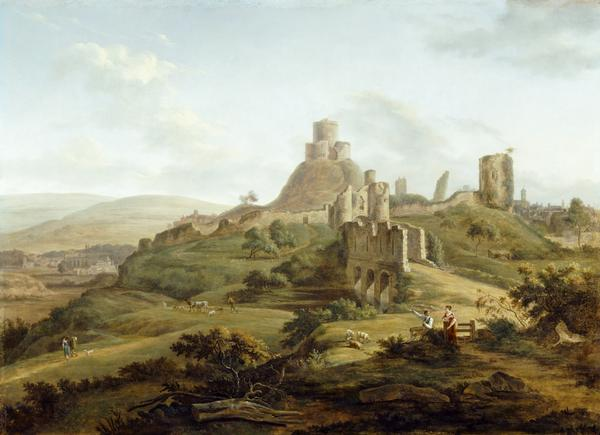
An 18th century depiction of Launceston Castle

Fitzcount remained loyal to John during the First Barons' War of 1215–17. He was one of a group of loyal barons that secured the south-west of England for the king. During the war Fitzcount was appointed High Sheriff of Cornwall on 17 September 1215. The king replaced him on 16 November 1215 with Robert de Cardinan as Fitzcount had assumed the title of Earl of Cornwall, without the permission of the king who planned to grant it to his son Richard. The king later reconciled with Fitzcount and in the 17th year of his rule (circa 1216), he was granted permission to farm all of Cornwall, until such time as the "Realm should be at Peace and the King is satisfied whether he ought to hold it as Part of his Inheritance, or as a Desmesne of the Crown". The grant is thought to have been made with the intention that Fitzcount would hold the land in trust for Richard. At the same time, he was awarded the holding of Launceston, Cornwall including its castle.

After Henry III succeeded John, Fitzcount received a further grant of the entire county including all demesnes. He was reappointed as high sheriff on 7 February 1217 by Henry III in recognition of his loyalty to John during the First Barons' War. Fitzcount incurred the king's displeasure and he soon took the grant back, taking Cornwall into crown ownership in 1220. Fitzcount's appointment as sheriff was terminated on 10 July 1220. Henry III commanded the new sheriff of Cornwall, William Lunet, to oversee the returning of all lands held or given out by Fitzcount to the crown, with the exception of those which had been given to Robert de Tintagel.

After he lost Cornwall, Fitzcount went on the Fifth Crusade to the Holy Land and died either there or at Gascony, while travelling, in 1222.
