= William Hals =

Cornish historian

William Hals (1655–1737) was a Cornish historian who compiled a History of Cornwall, the first work of any magnitude that was printed in Cornwall. He was born at Tresawsan, in the parish of Merther in Cornwall. Much of his work was never published but was used by other Cornish historians, including Davies Gilbert, Thomas Tonkin, and John Whitaker. Some of his original work is now held by the British Library.

== Family ==
His parents were James Hals of Fentongollan, and Anne, daughter of John Martin of Hurston, Devon. James was a son of Sir Nicholas Halse.

He married three times. His first wife was an Evans of Landrini in Wales, his second a Carveth of Perranzabuloe, and his last wife was a Courtenay of Tremere. He died without issue in 1737 or 1739 at Tregury (Tregurtha), in the parish of St Wenn, of which he owned the rectorial tithes.

== Parochial History of Cornwall ==
Hals began his work on the history of Cornwall in 1685, forming a collection which he continued until 1736, but it was never actually finished.

In about 1750 Andrew Brice, a publisher from Exeter, published Hals's Complete History of Cornwall, Part II being the Parochial History, containing accounts of seventy-two parishes, Advent to Helston. The fascicules were printed progressively at Truro (160 pages in all). However the first part was never published.

It is believed that the scandalous details included by Hals caused a discontinuance of the publication. Hals's incomplete History is very rare. The most complete copy is in the Grenville Library at the British Library.

The Parochial History of Cornwall by Davies Gilbert was based on the collections of Hals, with additional collections by Thomas Tonkin. Much of Hals's digressions and gossip is omitted. The manuscripts of Hals's History passed through various hands, and belonged at one time to Dr John Whitaker. They were given by Whitaker's daughter, Mrs Taunton, to Henry Sewell Stokes of Bodmin, Cornwall. Mr Stokes transferred them to Sir John Maclean, from whom they were acquired in 1875 for the British Museum.

== Other works ==
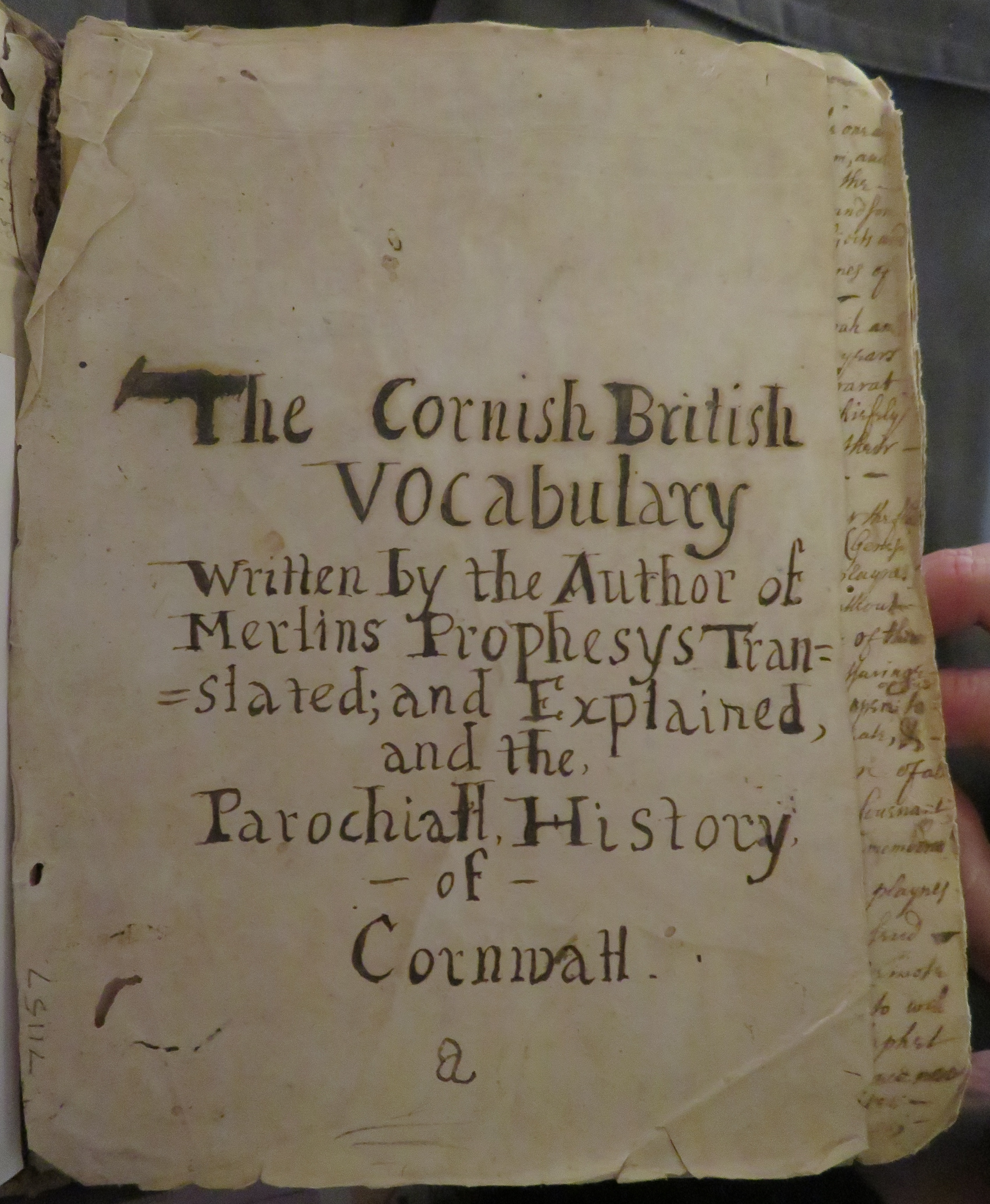
Title page of Hals' Cornish British Vocabulary [Add. MS 71157]

Other works in manuscript form held in the British Library

- The History of St. Michael's Mount
- Cornish British Vocabulary [Add. MS 71157] (c. 1701)
- An Latimer ay Kernow, a Dictionary of the Cornish Language
- John Keigwin's MS. of Mount Calvary (Pascon agan Arluth), (1679–1680) (amended transcript)

== Sources ==
- Boase and Courtney's Bibl. Cornub. 1874, i. 204, iii. 1214
- Polwhele's Hist. of Cornwall, 1806, v. 203
- D. Gilbert's Parochial Hist. of Cornwall, passim
- Notes and Queries, 3rd ser. xii. 22
- Gent. Mag. 1790 pt. ii. pp. 608, 711, 1791 pt. i. p. 32
- William Thomas Lowndes's Bibliographer's Manual 1858, i. 525
- Lysons's Magna Britannia, 1814, cv. 2
- H. Merivale's Historical Studies, 1865, p. 357
- Journal of Brit. Archæol. Assoc. xxxiii. 37
- Information from Mr. Stokes; see also note in Mr Stokes's Voyage of Arundel.
