= Earl of Cornwall =

Title superseded in 1337 by the Duke of Cornwall

The title of Earl of Cornwall was created several times in the Peerage of England before 1337, when it was superseded by the title Duke of Cornwall, which became attached to heirs-apparent to the throne.

== Condor of Cornwall ==
- Condor of Cornwall, probably legendary Earl of Cornwall before the Conquest, said to have paid homage to William for the Earldom

== Earls of Cornwall, 1st creation (1068) ==
- Brian of Brittany (c. 1040–1084 or 85), resigned c. 1072

== Earls of Cornwall, 2nd creation (c. 1072) ==
- Robert, Count of Mortain (c. 1038–1095), half-brother of William the Conqueror
- William, Count of Mortain (1084–1140), peerage forfeit 1106

== Cadoc II of Cornwall (c. 1106) ==
- Cadoc II (or Candor), son of Cadoc of Cornwall

== Earls of Cornwall, 1st creation (revived 1140) ==
- Alan (died 1146), nephew of Brian, deprived 1141

== Earls of Cornwall, 3rd creation (1141) ==
- Reginald de Dunstanville, Earl of Cornwall (died 1175), illegitimate son of King Henry I of England

== Earls of Cornwall, 4th creation (1225) ==
- Richard, 1st Earl of Cornwall, King of the Romans (1209–1272), second son of John, King of England
- Edmund, 2nd Earl of Cornwall (1249–1300), son

== Earls of Cornwall, 5th creation (1307) ==
- Piers Gaveston, Earl of Cornwall (1284–1312)

== Earls of Cornwall, 6th creation (1330) ==
- John of Eltham, Earl of Cornwall (1316–1336), second son of king Edward II of England and his queen Isabella of France

== See also ==
- Constitutional status of Cornwall
- Antiqua maneria, the original 17 manors belonging to the Earldom of Cornwall
- Duchy of Cornwall
- Kingdom of Cornwall
- List of legendary rulers of Cornwall
