= William of Mortain =

British Earl

- Earl of Cornwall; Earl of Kent

Count of Mortain
- Reign: 1095 - c. 1140
- Predecessor: Robert I
- Successor: Robert II
- Born: c. 1084
- Died: After 1140
- Father: Robert of Mortain
- Mother: Maud de Montgomery

William of Mortain (bef. 1084–aft. 1140) was Count of Mortain and the second Earl of Cornwall of 2nd creation.

== Life ==
William was the son of Robert, Count of Mortain, the half-brother of William I of England and Maud de Montgomery, daughter of Roger de Montgomerie, 1st Earl of Shrewsbury and Mabel de Bellême. William was born before 1084.

From childhood, he harboured a bitter dislike for his cousin Henry I of England, (Note: Among the reasons for intensely disliking Henry I, almost certainly included his mother's family, specifically his uncles Robert of Bellême, 3rd Earl of Shrewsbury, Hugh of Montgomery, 2nd Earl of Shrewsbury, Arnulf of Montgomery, and Roger the Poitevin who were all devout enemies of Henry. They had all been dispossessed of their English holdings and exiled from England shortly after Henry became king. See: J. F. A. Mason, 'Roger de Montgomery and His Sons (1067-1102)', Transactions of the Royal Historical Society, 5th series vol. 13 (1963), pp. 1-28.) and proudly demanded from him not only his father's earldoms of Mortain and Cornwall, but his uncle Odo, Bishop of Bayeux's Earldom of Kent. Clues to the character of William are to be found in the Hyde Chronicle, calling him "incorrigibly turbulent" and in William of Malmesbury's depiction of William as having "shameless arrogance." The king kept putting off William's demands for the earldom of Kent and instead offered him the hand of Mary of Scotland, Queen Matilda's sister, which William promptly rejected. Henry in turn gave her in marriage to Eustace III, Count of Boulogne. Henry continued to stall William's demands until he had dealt with the Montgomerys, William's uncles, and exiled them from England. Henry then removed lands in Cornwall from William he had allegedly misappropriated, after which William angrily left for Normandy joining forces with Robert Curthose. In Normandy William attacked several of Henry's holdings giving the king ample reasons to strip William of all his English honours.

He was captured with Duke Robert at the Battle of Tinchebrai (1106) and stripped of Mortain. William was imprisoned for many years in the Tower of London, and in 1140 became a Cluniac monk at Bermondsey Abbey, just across the River Thames from the Tower of London.

== Notes ==
French nobility
Preceded by Robert	Count of Mortain; 1095–1106	Succeeded by Robert II
Peerage of England
Preceded by Robert	Earl of Cornwall; 1095–1104	Succeeded by Forfeit
