= Josh Powell (disambiguation) =

Josh Powell is an American basketball player. It might also refer to:

- Joshua Powell, British conservation biologist
- Josh Powell (footballer), British footballer
- Josh Powell (murderer), perpetrator of a murder-suicide in Utah
- Josh Powell (politician), American politician
