= Chysauster Ancient Village =

Ruins in Cornwall, England

Chysauster
- Chisylvester Goth (Cornish)
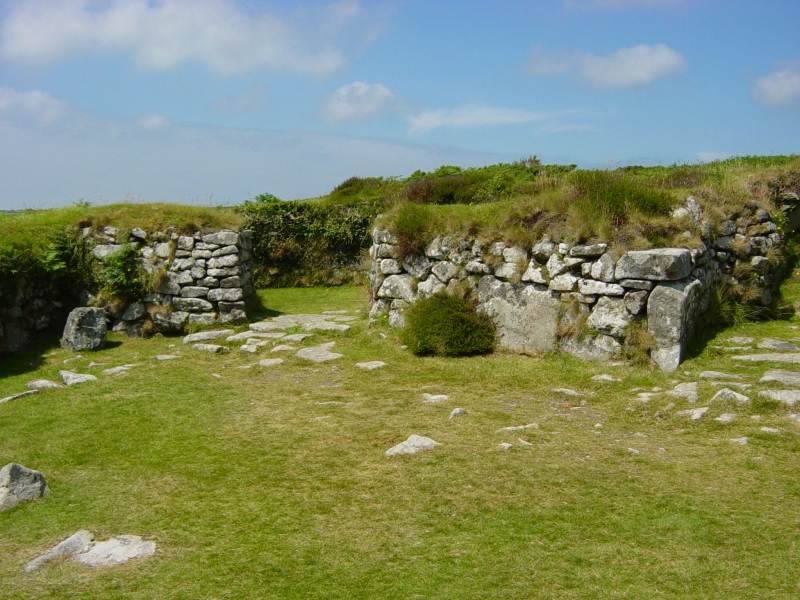
- Rooms in a building within Chysauster village

- Location within Southwest Cornwall
- 50.16103°N 5.54022°W
- Type: Ancient village
- Periods: Iron Age/Roman
- Cultures: Romano-British
- Location: New Mill, Cornwall grid reference SW471350

History
- Built: c. 100 BC
- Abandoned: c. 300 AD

Site notes
- Condition: Ruins
- Owner: English Heritage
- Public access: Yes

Scheduled monument
- Official name: Chysauster courtyard house settlement, fogou, round cairn and part of a prehistoric field system
- Designated: 03 February 1984
- Reference no.: 1006726

Chysauster Ancient Village (Cornish: Chisylvester Goth, meaning Sylvester's old house) is a late Iron Age and Romano-British village of courtyard houses in Cornwall, England, United Kingdom, which is currently in the care of English Heritage. The village included eight to ten houses, each with its own internal courtyard. To the southeast is the remains of a fogou, an underground structure of uncertain function.

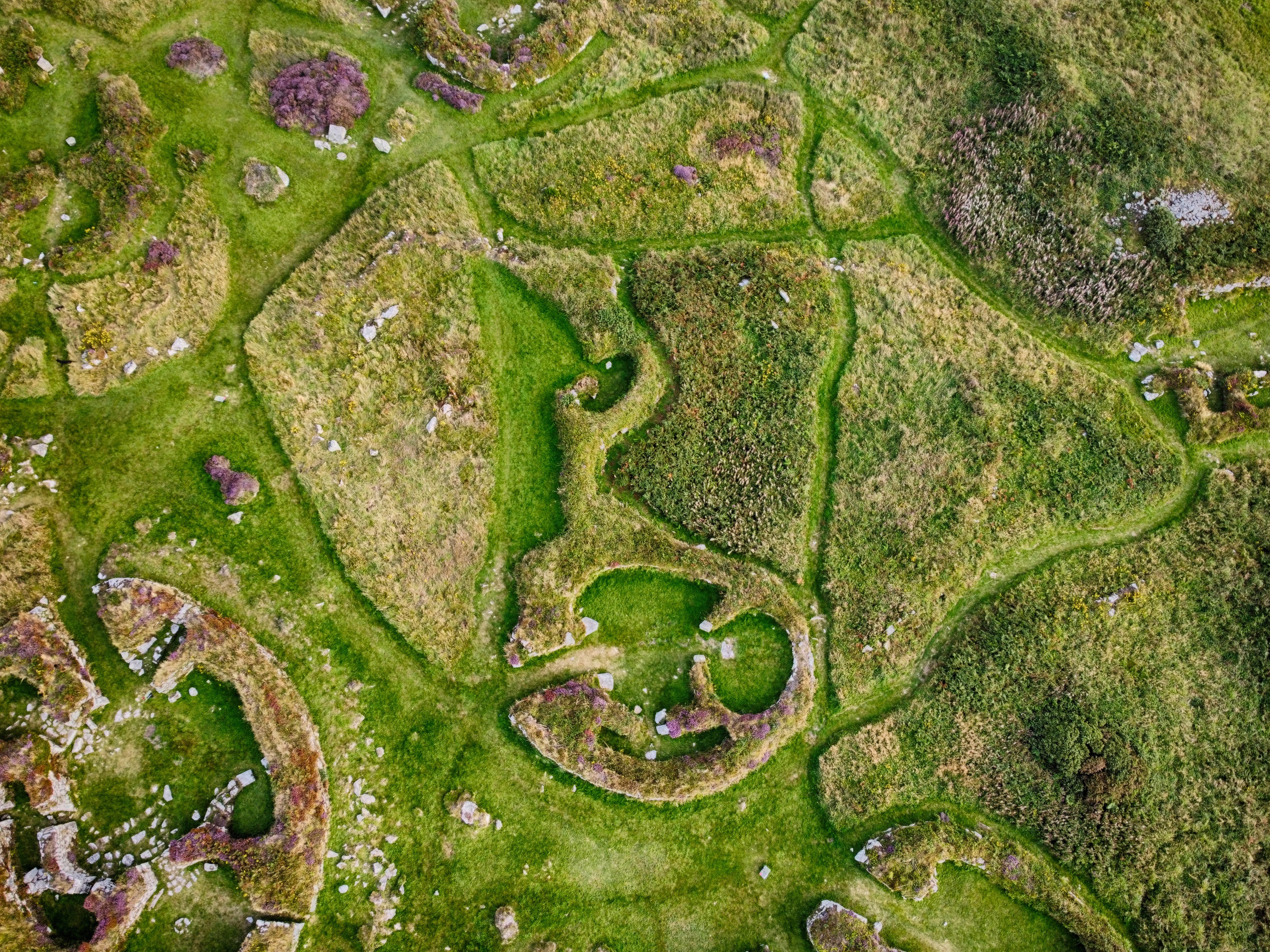
Over the top of Chysauster Ancient Village

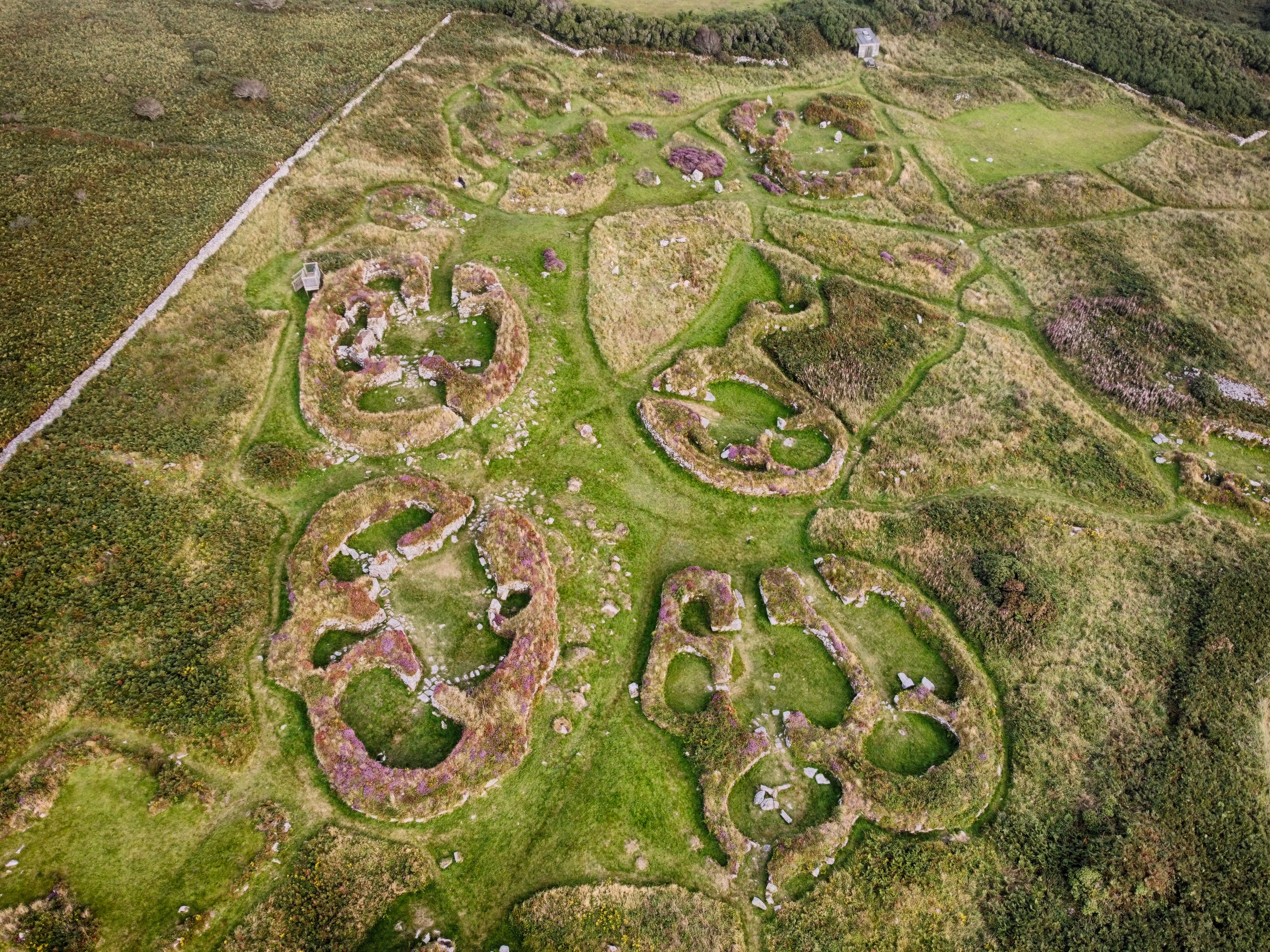
Aerial View of Chysauster Ancient Village

== Location ==
Chysauster lies in southwest Cornwall in the Penwith District. It is located about 5 km north of Penzance at 175 m above sea level. The site is open from March/April to early November, and it is in the care of English Heritage, who charge an admission fee. The iron-age hill fort of Castle An Dinas is just over 1 km to the east. Another similar Iron Age settlement is Carn Euny about 10 km to the southwest and comparisons can be made with the contemporary Atlantic Castro culture.

== Settlement ==
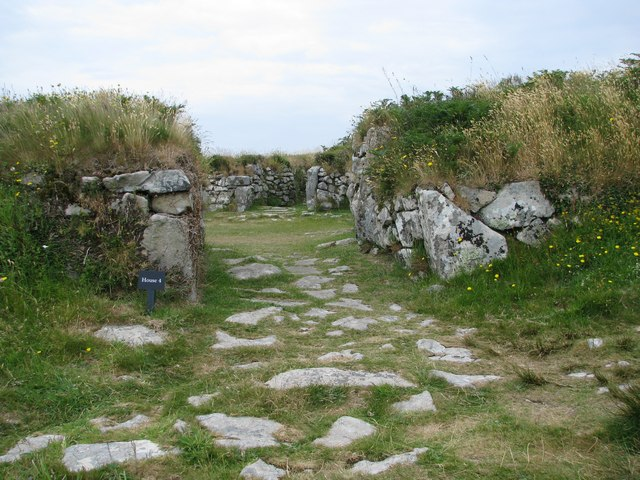
Entrance to one of the houses

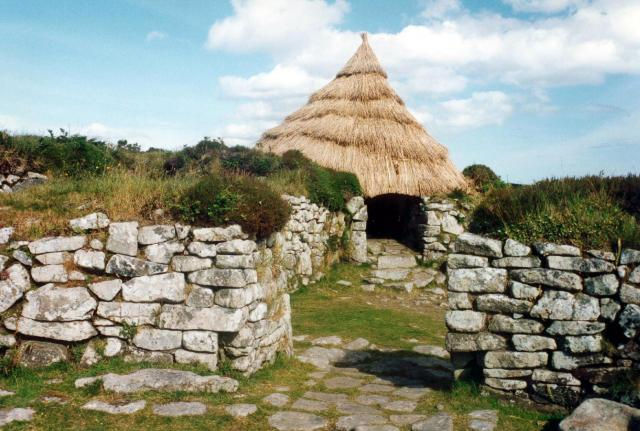
Temporary roof placed over one of the rooms, July 1993

Chysauster village is believed to have been inhabited from about 100 BC until the 3rd century AD; it was primarily agricultural and unfortified and probably occupied by members of the Dumnonii tribe. The village consists of the remains of around 10 courtyard houses, each around 30 metres in diameter. Eight of the houses form two distinct rows, and each house had an open central courtyard surrounded by a number of thatched rooms. The houses have a similar layout. The buildings are oriented on an east-west axis, with the entrance facing east. The walls survive to heights of up to 3 metres. A field system in the vicinity attests to the site's farming connections.

Chysauster has been excavated several times, including a dig by the antiquarian William Copeland Borlase in 1873. Reconstruction work has been carried out on several occasions.

== Fogou ==
To the south of the settlement is an underground passage of a type known locally as fogou (from the permanently lenited form of mogow, Cornish for cave). Fogous can be found in other places in the UK and Ireland, and are known more generally as souterrains; their purpose is unclear. The fogou at Chysauster was originally recorded as running well over 16 metres in length but was blocked up in the late 20th century for safety reasons. It was recorded around 1847 by Henry Crozier who described it as a "voe or sepulchral chamber".
