= Subterranea (geography) =

Underground space, natural and man-made underground structures

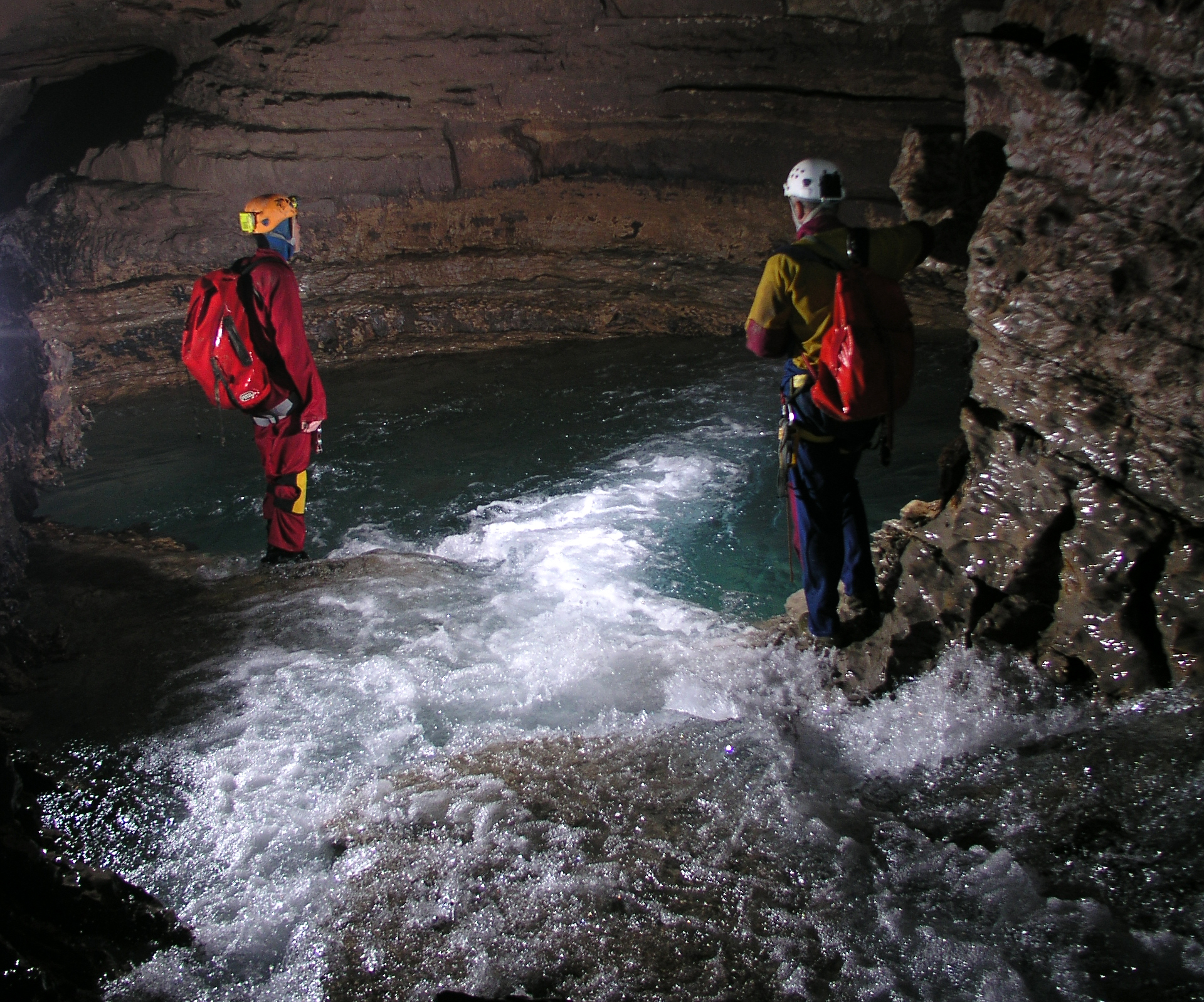
Subterranean river in Castellet-lès-Sausses

Subterranea are underground structures, both natural (such as caves) and human-made (such as mines).

Some subterranea and related topics include:

== Natural ==
- Caves
  - Cenote
  - Ice cave
  - Sea cave
  - Sinkhole
- Karst
- Lava tube
  - Lunar and Martian lava tubes
- Subterranean river
- Subterranean waterfall
- Underground lake
- Volcanic pipe

== Human-made or human-related by common function ==
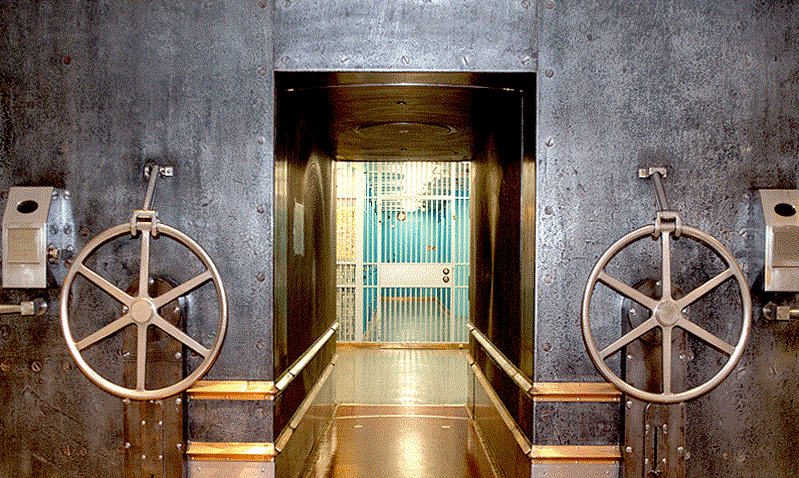
Entrance to the underground vault of the Federal Reserve Bank of New York Building

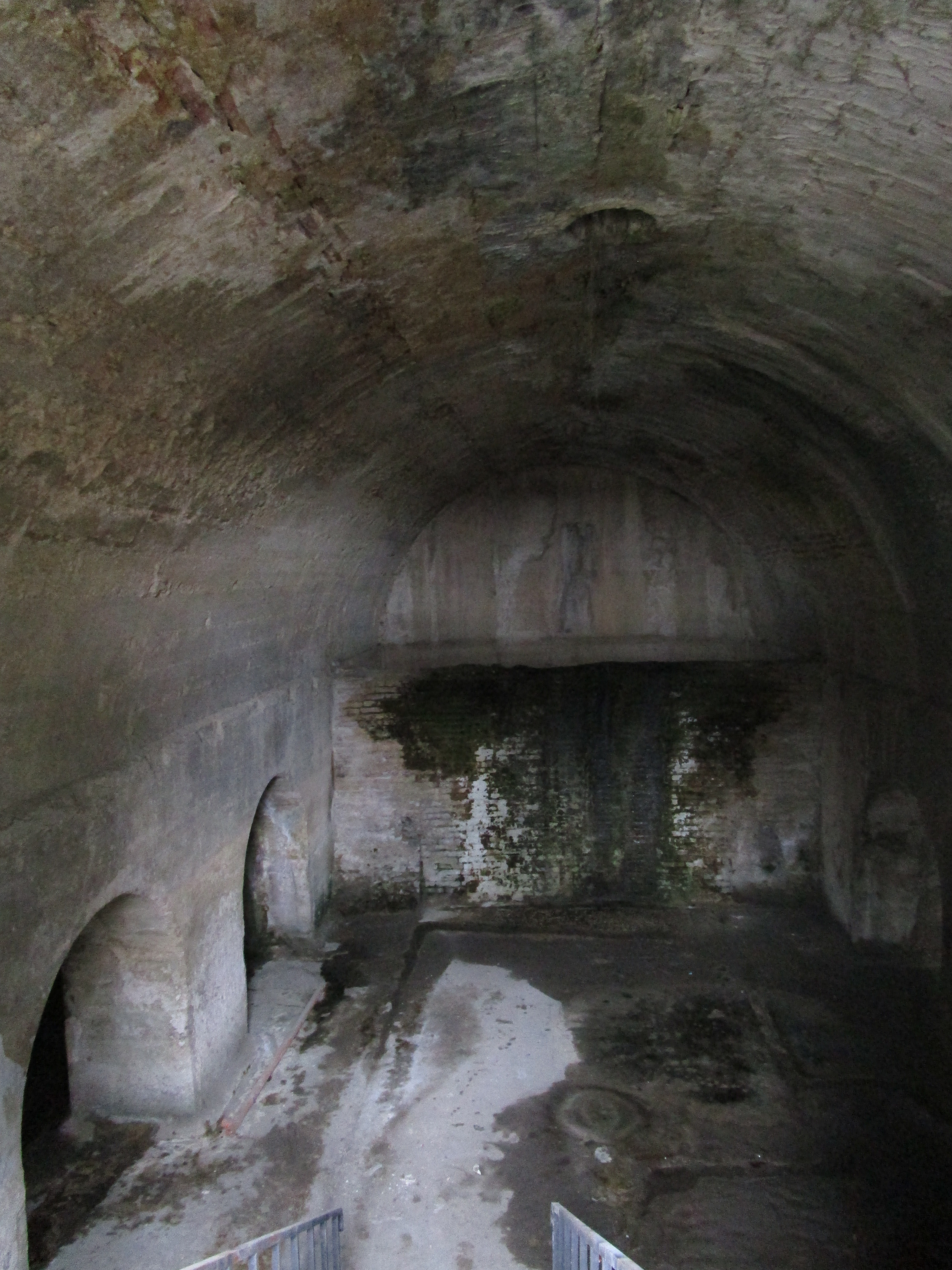
Large underground Ancient Roman cistern in Chieti, Italy

The following is a list of examples of structures which are or can be underground.

- Civil defense
  - Air raid shelter
  - Blast shelter
  - Fallout shelter
  - Storm cellar
- Cultural heritage
  - Catacombs
  - Dungeon
  - Erdstall
  - Fogou
  - Hypogeum
  - Passage grave
  - Rock-cut architecture
    - Rock-cut tomb
- Disposal of corpses or religion:
  - Burial vault
  - Crypt
- Living
  - Basement
  - Cave dwelling
  - Dugout
  - Earth shelter
  - Underground city
- Maintenance
  - Manhole
  - Utility vault
- Extractive activities
  - Mine
  - Quarry
- Military
  - Bunker
  - Casemate
  - Foxhole
  - Missile launch facility
  - Spiderhole
  - Underground base
  - Underground hangar
- Storage
  - Bank vault
  - Root cellar
  - Wine cave
- Transport
  - Tunnel
    - Smuggling tunnel
  - Secret passage
  - Underground rapid transit system
- Water supply, wastewater or drainage
  - Dry well
  - Stepwell
  - Sewerage
  - Well
- Other or multiple functions
  - Borehole
  - Ventilation shaft

== See also ==
- Boring (earth)
- Seattle Underground
- Subterranean London
