= Halliggye Fogou =

Underground structure in Cornwall, England

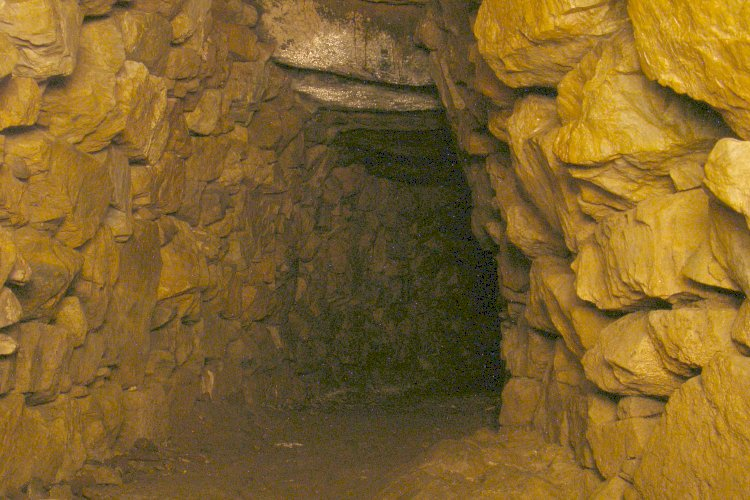
- Main chamber of the fogou

- Location within Southwest Cornwall
- 50°04′15″N 5°11′46″W
- Type: Fogou
- Periods: Iron Age
- Cultures: Cornish
- Location: Mawgan-in-Meneage
- OS grid reference: SW71322394

Site notes
- Owner: English Heritage
- Public access: Yes

Scheduled monument
- Part of: Later prehistoric to Roman round incorporating contemporary fogou at Halliggye

Halliggye Fogou is one of many fogous in Cornwall, England, United Kingdom.

The site is under the guardianship of English Heritage, and managed by the Trelowarren Estate, where the fogou is located. Entry to the fogou is free.

== Description ==
The Halliggye Fogou is set within a round, a type of embanked and ditched enclosure dating from the later Iron Age and Roman periods. The enclosure, including the fogou, is a designated scheduled monument.

The fogou consists of a long narrow tunnel leading to three sectioned chambers. A window-like entrance which was dug in Victorian times by supposed treasure hunters has since been filled in.

The complex of passages has a roof and walls of stone, and is the largest and best-preserved of several mysterious tunnels associated with Cornish Iron Age settlements.

== Archaeological history ==
It was described by Sir Richard Vyvyan in his "Account of the ‘fogou’ or cave at Halligey, Trelowarren", in the Journal of the Royal Institution of Cornwall (1885, viii. 256–58). In 1861, J. T. Blight wrote a comprehensive description and drafted plans of the fogou in conjunction with Sir Richard Vyvyan, the landowner who listed finds as a vase containing ashes and a roughly made cup, both of Celtic manufacture, and animal bones possibly from a deer.

In the 1980s, a series of small excavations were carried out by English Heritage mainly to clear debris from the passage to aid examination and repair work after routine ploughing of the field, when the blade of the plough breached the roof of the main chamber: this hole has since been turned into an entrance stairway for visitors. Pottery found during excavations has included local Iron Age cordoned wares and some sherds of Roman Samian ware from southern Gaul.

It was used during the Second World War by the Manaccan Auxiliary Unit as an explosives and ammunition store.

== See also ==
- Petrosomatoglyph Symbolism
