= Festival of History =

British history event

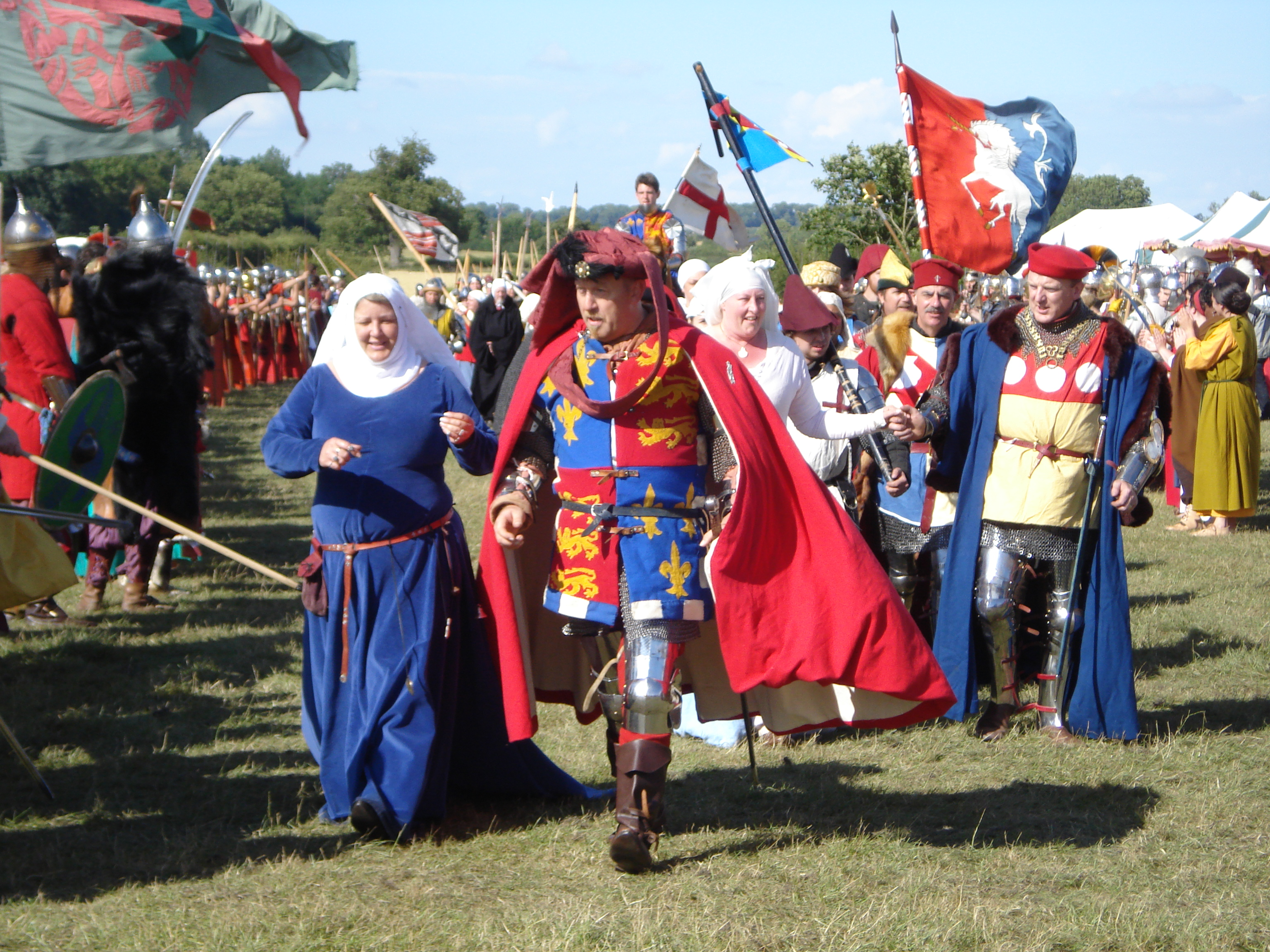
Performers at Kelmarsh in 2010

History Live (formerly The Festival of History) was an annual summer event held by English Heritage. The event focused on historical re-enactment. The first event was held in 2003 in the grounds of Stoneleigh Park in Warwickshire and attracted 10,000 visitors. It was held once more at Stoneleigh Park in 2004, before moving to Kelmarsh Hall in Northamptonshire, where it was held either in July or August from 2005 onwards. At the time it was Europe's biggest historical event.

== Aims ==
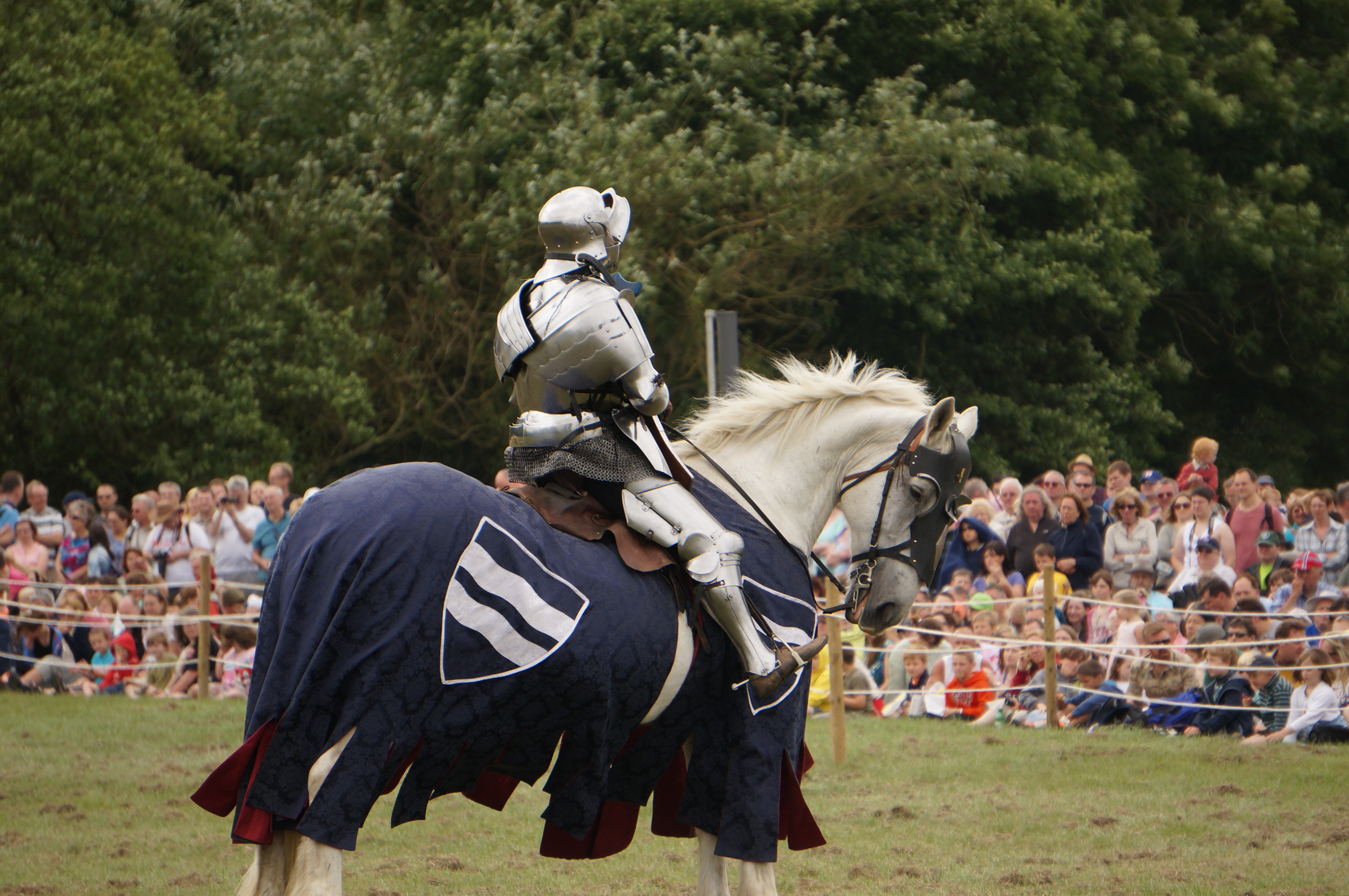
A jousting reenactment at Kelmarsh in 2013

English Heritage is the executive non-departmental public body of the British Government sponsored by the Department for Culture, Media and Sport which is responsible for the historic built environment in the UK. Public education on the history of England is a large part of the body's remit. At the time it was held, English Heritage described the Festival of History as its "flagship event" and the "highlight of its event calendar".

Features of the event included historical re-enactments involving several thousand people in all, aerial displays, demonstrations, specialist talks, story-telling, theatre and hands-on events for children.

== History ==
=== At Stoneleigh Park ===
- 2003, 9–10 August, 10,000 visitors. Set piece re-enactment: The Battle of Edgehill
- 2004, 11–12 August, 14,000 visitors. Set piece re-enactment: Boudica's final battle.

=== At Kelmarsh Hall ===
- 2005, 13–14 August. Set piece re-enactment: The Battle of Naseby.
- 2006, 12–13 August.
- 2007, 11–12 August, 17,215 visitors.
- 2008, 19–20 July, 17,784 visitors.
- 2009, 25–26 July, 19,000 visitors. Set piece re-enactments: The Siege of Harfleur; the Battle of Agincourt; the Battle of Waterloo.
- 2010, 17–18 July.
- 2012, Arranged for 14–15 July. Due to torrential rain & flooding in the early hours of Saturday morning it had to be cancelled.

== 2011 event ==
The 2011 event on 16 and 17 July 2011 at Kelmarsh Hall includes re-enactments of the Imperial Roman Army and gladiatorial fighting; armoured knights and medieval jousting; a display of "tent-pegging", a medieval Indian sport; the Duke of Wellington's redcoats; a Victorian gymkhana; a replica World War I trench and World War II action including a Spitfire flypast. As well as re-enactments there were family activities and sideshows, as well as public talks given by well-known historians and archaeologists.

2011 saw the inaugural Festival of Historical Writing at the event, in partnership with the Historical Writers' Association. Guest speakers include Michael Morpurgo, the author of War Horse, and Manda Scott.

== History Live! ==
In 2014, the event was renamed History Live! and was still held at Kelmarsh Hall. In February 2015, English Heritage announced there would be no History Live! in 2015 stating "History Live! will not be returning this year, in order to concentrate on delivering a wider range of events across England."
