= Fortress House =

Former UK government building

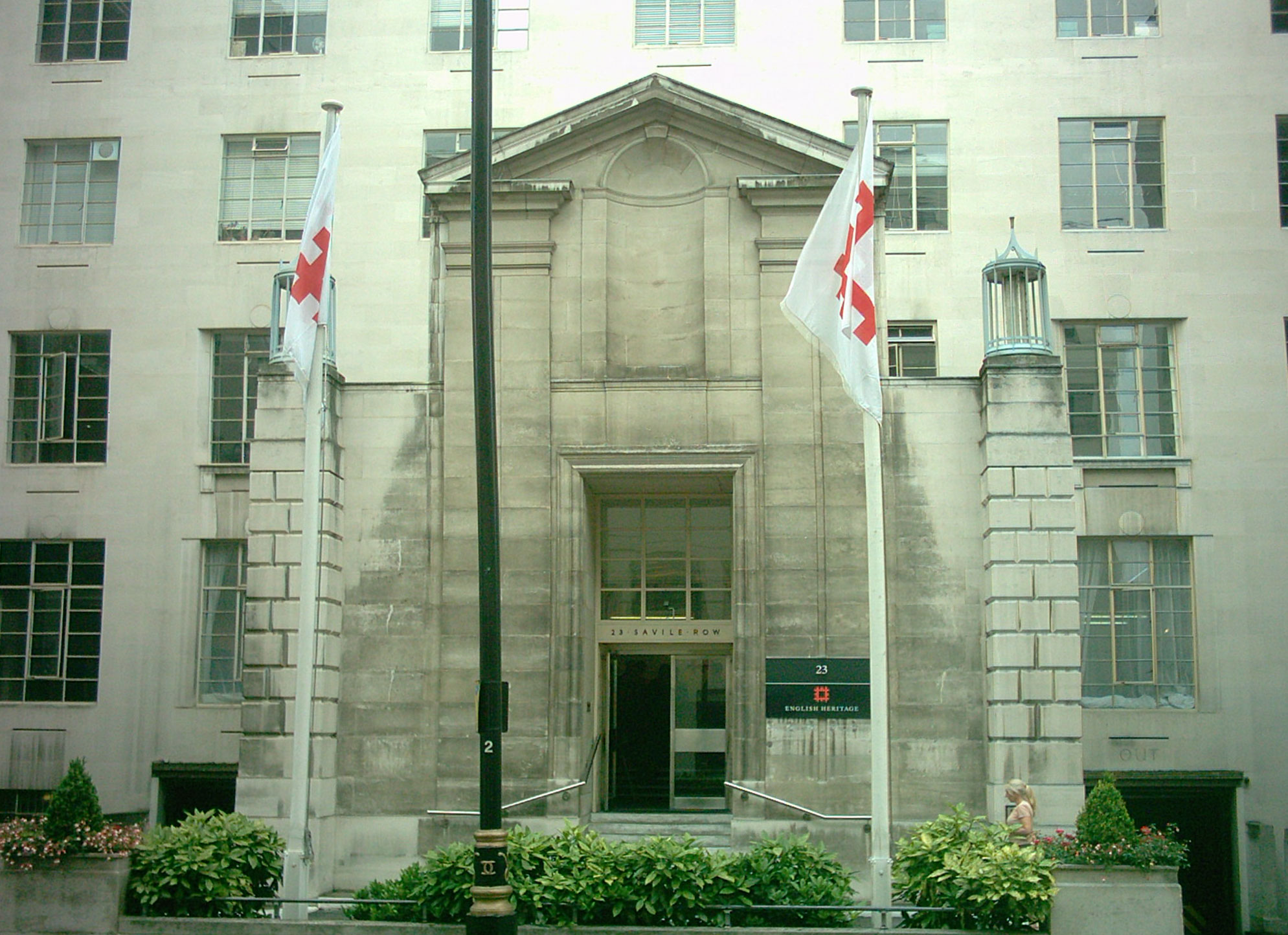
- Fortress House, the former London headquarters of English Heritage at 23 Savile Row

- Location within Central London Location within England Location within the United Kingdom

General information
- Location: London, United Kingdom
- Coordinates: 51.5119°N 0.1411°W
- Construction started: 1949
- Construction stopped: 1950
- Demolished: 2009

Fortress House was a building with its main entrance at 23 Savile Row in London W1, also including 5–9 New Burlington Street. It was built in 1949–50 to a design by Anthony Lloyd, and demolished in 2009. At first it housed arms of central government, then from 1971 to 2006 it was the headquarters of the body that became English Heritage.

== Site ==
The building was located on the eastern side of Savile Row, to the north of New Burlington Street and south of New Burlington Place. Until the 1930s, Savile Row ended at its junction with Boyle Street, just north of New Burlington Street. The route north continued through a narrow passageway, Savile Place, between No 22 and No 23 Savile Row, and then became Mill Street, which crossed Conduit Street on a slightly different alignment. No 22 was demolished around 1937 to allow Savile Row to continue to the north without interruption, to improve access to a new police station across the road at no 27, on the corner of Savile Row and Boyle Street. As a result of the slight misalignment of the road, the site where Fortress House was built occupied a prominent site where the road veered, clearly visible from both directions.

== Design ==
The main designer was Anthony Lloyd, although his partner, who was his father-in-law William Curtis Green RA (1875–1960), may also have been involved in the design. Lloyd adopted an austere style, with some classical motifs. The building was described by Nikolaus Pevsner as "large and monumental and self-consciously Lutyens, though with occasional rococo bits".

Lloyd adopted a symmetrical "H" plan, with the main rectangular block of eight stories set back from the street with courtyard in front, and wings of seven stories to either side. The design maximised light and air, but broke the building line along Savile Row. It was constructed using a reinforced concrete frame with reinforced concrete floors and a flat roof. The façades on Savile Row and New Burlington Street were faced with Portland stone; other sides, including New Burlington Place, and internal courtyards were faced in brown Uxbridge flint bricks. The building had little ornamentation: rustication on the ground floor disguised a change in levels along Savile Row, and a dental cornice at the top of the central block. A large entrance porch to central block, with pilasters surmounted by a recessed semi-circular headed niche within an open triangular pediment. Decorative sculptural motifs were carved by Laurence Turner.

== History ==
The building was constructed by Sir Robert McAlpine and Sons in 1949–50. It was later occupied by the Ministry of Town and Country Planning. Next it became the headquarters of the Ministry of Health in 1951, and later the headquarters of the Civil Service Commission.

Finally, in 1971 it became the headquarters of the government office that became English Heritage in 1983 (the present day Historic England agency and English Heritage Trust charity). English Heritage was paid £3m to leave in 2006, ten years before the end of its lease, and moved to the old Prudential building at Holborn Bars.

In 2006, the Secretary of State for Culture, Media and Sport issued a certificate of exemption from listing effective until December 2010. Westminster City Council granted Conservation Area consent authorising demolition. SAVE Britain's Heritage and the 20th Century Society campaigned for it to be saved, but the building and consent for its site's redevelopment, was sold by Legal & General in 2006 for around £110m.

It was demolished in 2009 and replaced by a mixed-use development, designed by Eric Parry Architects. A public art sculpture by Joel Shapiro is located above the Savile Row entrance. The new building was sold in 2012 for around £220m.
