= Pendeen Vau =

Archaeological site in England

- Fow Penndin (Cornish)
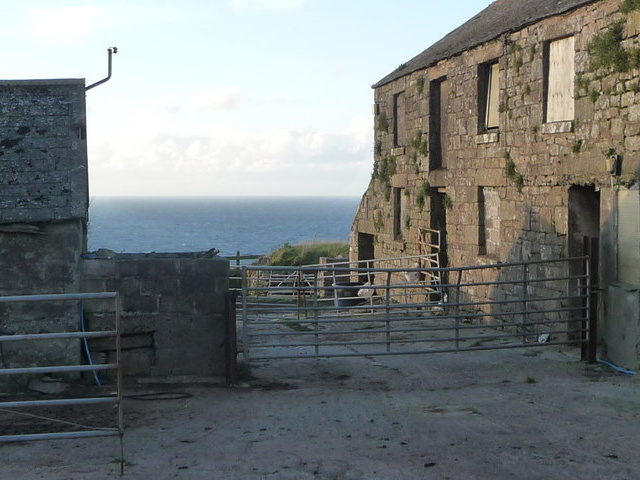
- Pendeen Manor with the fogou in the background

- Location within Southwest Cornwall
- 50.1620°N 5.6647°W
- Type: Fogou
- Periods: Iron Age / Romano-British
- Location: Pendeen, Cornwall

Pendeen Vau (Cornish: Fow Penndin) is a fogou on the Cornish coast of England, near the village of Pendeen. It is situated at Pendeen (Manor) farm, once the home of the renowned historian William Borlase about half a mile from Pendeen Lighthouse. As the fogou is on private land, it is only accessible by asking permission at Pendeen Manor farm.
