= Treveneague =

Coordinates: 50°08′33″N 5°25′59″W

Treveneague is an area near Goldsithney, Penzance, in the civil parish of St Hilary. It was originally composed of two places, North Treveneague and South Treveneague. The Grade II listed early 19th century North Treveneague Farmhouse and Farm Buildings North of Treveneague Farmhouse are located here. In the 1860s, an Iron Age fogou was discovered at Treveneague. The location of the fogou was located using Geophysics during a 1996 Time Team episode.
