= Souterrain =

Underground structure associated mainly with the Atlantic Iron Age

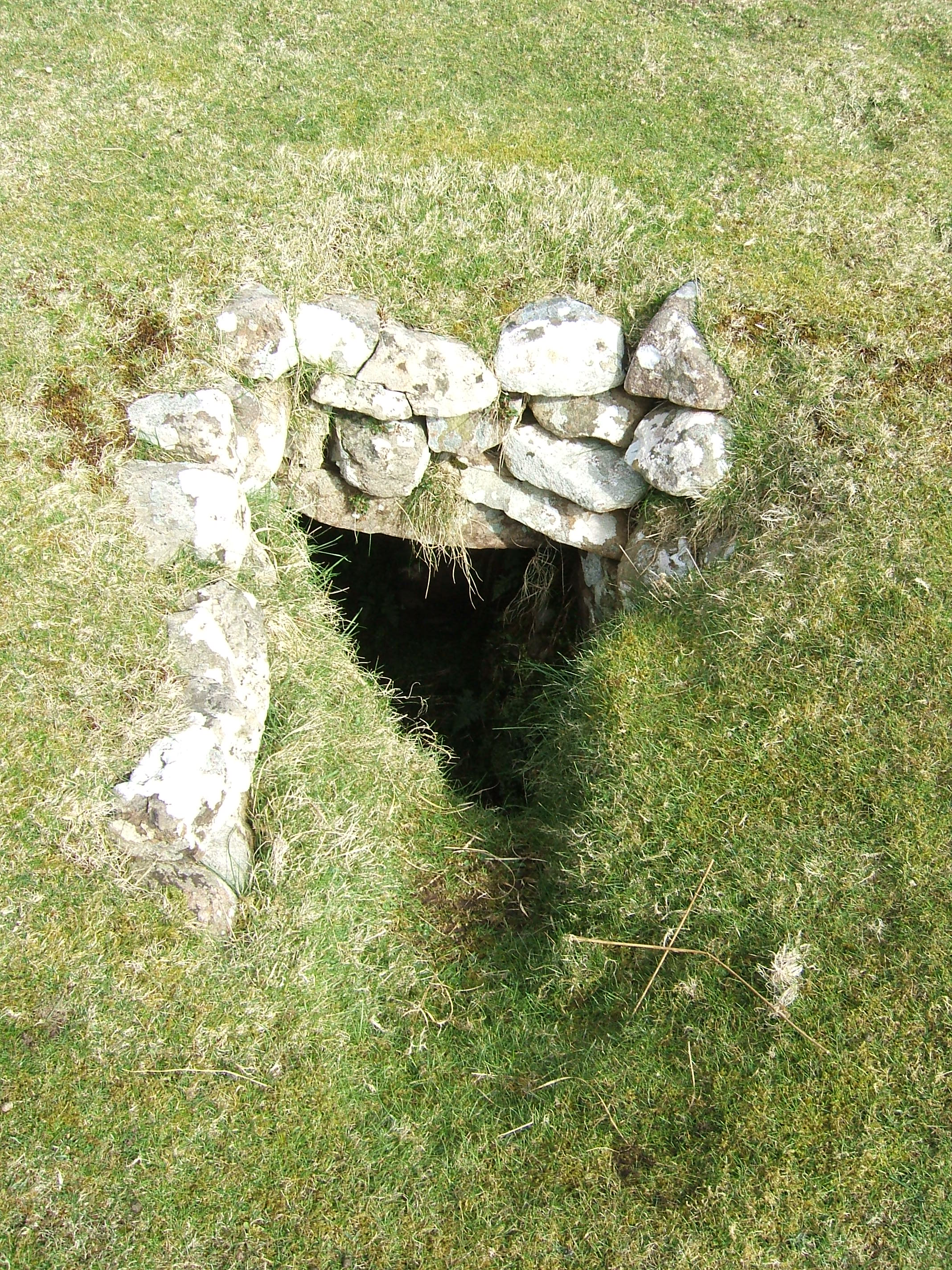
Souterrain on Canna in the Hebrides

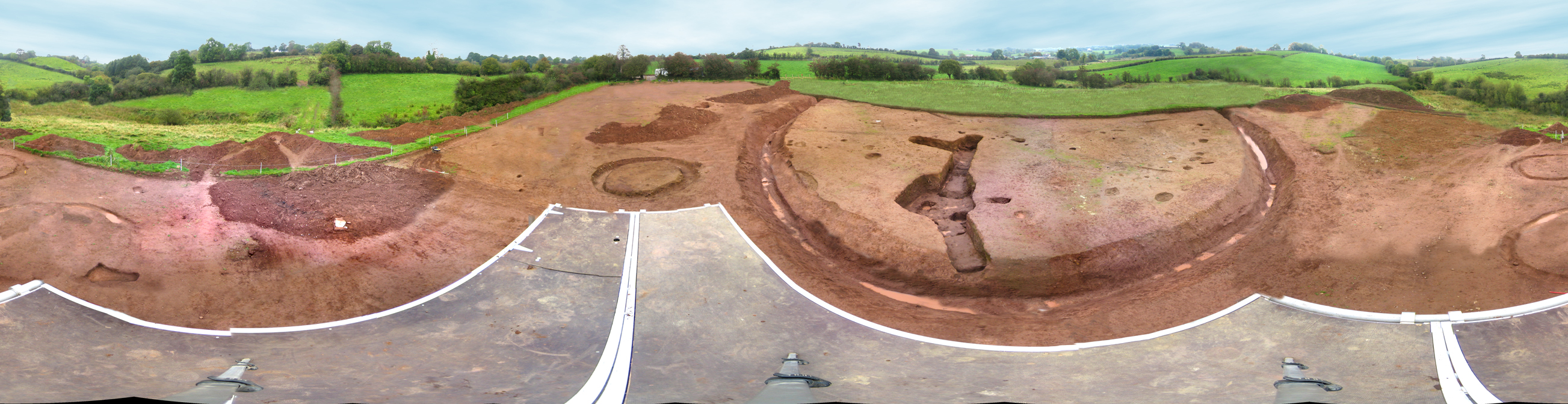
Panoramic view of a souterrain contemporary with a ringfort dating to around 700 AD, built within a much earlier barrow cemetery, in County Armagh, Northern Ireland

Souterrain (from French sous terrain), meaning "subterrain", is a name given by archaeologists to a type of underground structure associated mainly with the European Atlantic Iron Age.

These structures appear to have been brought northwards from Gaul during the late Iron Age. Regional names include earth houses, fogous and Pictish houses. The term souterrain has been used as a distinct term from fogou meaning 'cave'. In Cornwall the regional name of fogou (Cornish for 'cave') is applied to souterrain structures. The design of underground structures has been shown to differ among regions; for example, in western Cornwall the design and function of the fogou appears to correlate with a larder use.

== Etymology ==
The name souterrain comes from the French language (sous-terrain or souterrain), in which it means "underground passageway" or refers to subterranea in general. In languages other than English, it is sometimes used to mean "basement", especially in warehouses, or semi-basement.

== Construction and suggested purpose ==
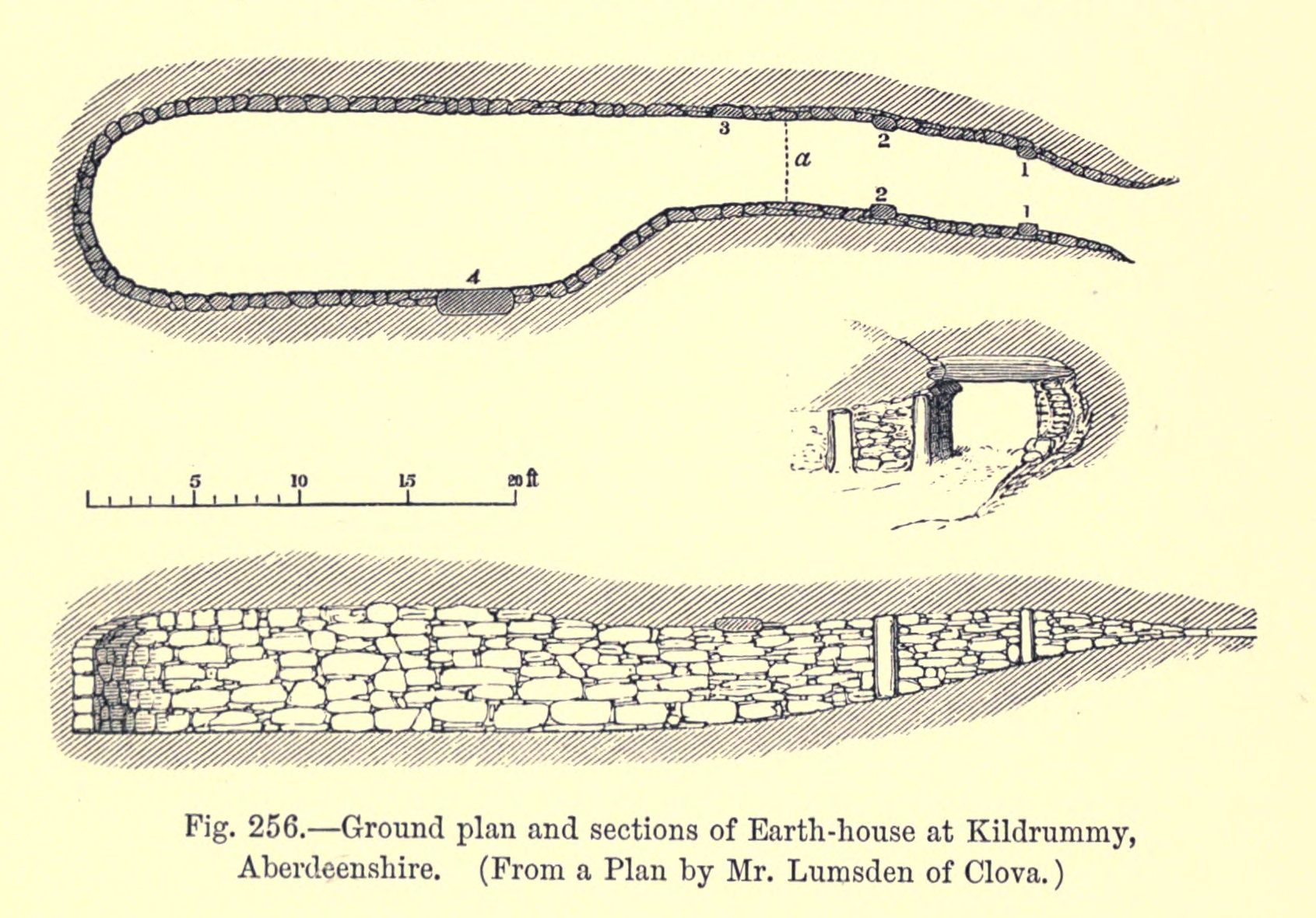
Plan and sections of an earth-house at Kildrummy, Aberdeenshire

Souterrains are underground galleries and, in their early stages, were always associated with a settlement. The galleries were dug out and then lined with stone slabs or wood before being reburied. In cases where they were cut into rock this was not always necessary. They do not appear to have been used for burial or ritual purposes and it has been suggested that they were food stores or hiding places during times of strife, although some of them would have had very obvious entrances.

== Examples ==
=== Brechin ===
An example of a wood-lined Iron Age souterrain with a possible water tank was excavated in 2016 at Brechin Farm, Angus by Headland Archaeology. It was 15 metres (50 feet) in total length and was constructed in a 'C' shape with two distinct chambers. A linear ditch was located immediately adjacent to the souterrain and was connected to the southwest chamber by a tunnel. This tunnel sloped gently downwards towards the chamber and its edges were iron-panned, indicating that water had run through it for a significant amount of time. This indicates the southwest chamber was used as some kind of water collection and storage system. The soil into which the souterrain was dug was soft sand that would have been impossible to maintain without a lining; the presence of stake holes along the edge of the northeast chamber and the lack of stones means that the walls would have been wood-lined. Radiocarbon dating suggests occupation between the 1st and 3rd centuries AD.

=== Rosal ===
An example of an excavated souterrain is the site at Rosal, Strathnaver, Sutherland. In this excavation, no artefacts or other finds were made inside the structure and the roof may have been only partially covered with stones, a timber roof being present on part of it. It was suggested that the souterrain could have been used as a byre or barn and it was associated with an abandoned settlement.

=== Castle Bloody ===
An example of a partially explored souterrain in northern Scotland, on Shapinsay in the Orkney Islands is Castle Bloody, situated near the seacoast. Another example has been excavated in Perthshire near Alyth.

In Scotland some souterrains may be connected with the same people who built brochs.

=== Newtownbalregan ===
A well-illustrated account of a souterrain excavated at Newtownbalregan, County Louth, one of the many souterrains discovered during a road-building project in Ireland, may be found in Archaeology Ireland Winter 2003 issue.

=== Farrandreg ===
A full report on the excavation of a three-level souterrain at Farrandreg, County Louth, in 1998 gives references for the 14 souterrains previously excavated in this souterrain-rich county. Finds included a rotary quern-stone (a grinding stone), a bone comb, a copper-alloy stick pin, three bone needles and the greater part of a tub-shaped pottery vessel in ‘Souterrain ware.’ Based on the finds, the excavator concluded the souterrain had been closed up in the 12th century.

=== Other Irish souterrains ===
Souterrains often are referred to in Ireland simply as 'caves'. A. T. Lucas, a folklorist and director of the National Museum of Ireland in the 1960s, published a series of articles on the references to souterrains in the early Irish annals. Donaghmore Souterrain, discovered in County Louth in 1960, and Drumlohan Souterrain in County Waterford are the only souterrains to be an Irish National Monument.

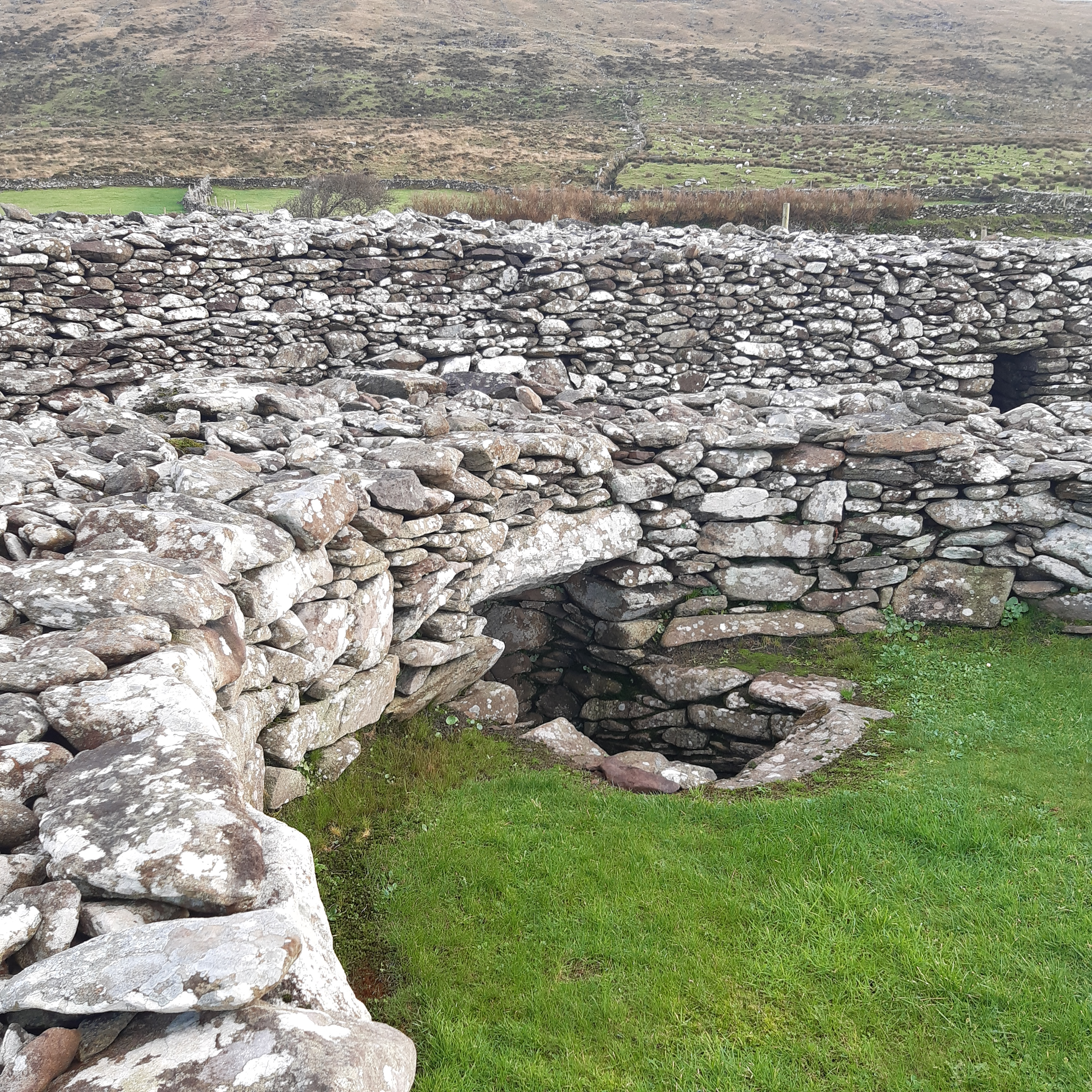
Entrance to a souterrain at Ballynavenooragh stone fort, County Kerry, Ireland

In Ireland, souterrains often are found inside or in close proximity to a ringfort and as such are thought to be mainly contemporary with them, making them somewhat later in date than in other countries. This date is reinforced by many examples where ogham stones dating to around the 6th century have been reused as roofing lintels or door posts, most notably at the widened natural limestone fissure at the 'Cave of the Cats' in Rathcrogan.

The distribution of souterrains is very uneven in Ireland, with the greatest concentrations occurring in north Louth, north Antrim, south Galway, and west Cork and Kerry. Lesser numbers are found in counties Meath, Westmeath, Mayo, north Donegal, and Waterford. Other counties, such as Limerick, Carlow, and Wexford, are almost completely lacking in examples.

An article by Warner on the archaeology of souterrains, although published 47 years ago, still is possibly the best general overview of the subject.

The most comprehensive study of Irish souterrains is M. Clinton's 2001 work, containing chapters on distribution, associated settlements, function, finds, chronology and 13 appendices on various structural aspects of souterrains.

A short summary account of souterrains in Ireland appeared in the quarterly magazine Archaeology Ireland in 2004.

== See also ==
- Erdstall – Type of tunnel found across Europe
- Pit-house – Type of earth shelter with ancient origins
