= English Heritage =

Charity responsible for the National Heritage Collection of England

- Logo
- Predecessor: The Historic Buildings and Monuments Commission for England, also known as English Heritage
- Formation: 1 April 2015; Preceding English Heritage government agency, formed 1983
- Type: Charity
- Registration no.: 1140351
- Headquarters: The Engine House, Swindon
- Region served: England
- Fields: Heritage
- Members: 1.18 million (2022/23)
- Chairman: Tony Hales CBE
- Chief Executive: Geoff Parkin
- Revenue: £141 million (2023/24)
- Expenses: £155.4 million (2023/24)
- Staff: 2,507 (2023)
- Volunteers: 4,922 (2023)
- Website: www.english-heritage.org.uk

English Heritage (officially the English Heritage Trust) is a charity that manages over 400 historic monuments, buildings and places. These include prehistoric sites, a battlefield, medieval castles, Roman forts, historic industrial sites, listed ruins, architecturally notable English country houses and historic designed landscapes.

The charity states that it uses these properties to "bring the story of England to life for over 10 million people each year". Within its portfolio are Stonehenge, Dover Castle, Tintagel Castle, and the "best-preserved" parts of Hadrian's Wall. English Heritage also manages the London blue plaque scheme, which links influential historical figures to particular buildings.

When formed in 1983, English Heritage was the operating name of an executive non-departmental public body of the British Government, officially titled the Historic Buildings and Monuments Commission for England, that ran the national system of heritage protection and managed a range of historic properties. It was created to combine the roles of existing bodies that had emerged from a long period of state involvement in heritage protection. In 1999, the organisation merged with the Royal Commission on the Historical Monuments of England and the National Monuments Record, bringing together resources for the identification and survey of England's historic environment.

On 1 April 2015, English Heritage was divided into two parts: Historic England, which inherited the regulatory, statutory, and protection functions of the old organisation, and the new English Heritage Trust, a business and charity that would operate the historic properties, and which took on the English Heritage operating name and logo. The British government gave the new charity an £80 million grant to help establish it as an independent trust, although the historic properties remain in the ownership of the state.

== History ==
=== Non-departmental public body ===
Over the centuries, what is now called "heritage" has been the responsibility of a series of state departments. There was the "Kings Works" after the Norman Conquest, the Office of Works (1378–1832), the Office of Woods, Forests, Land Revenues and Works (1832–1851), and the Ministry of Works (1851–1962). Responsibility subsequently transferred to the Ministry of Public Building and Works (1962–1970), then to the Department of the Environment (1970–1997), and it is now with the Department for Culture, Media and Sport (DCMS). The state's legal responsibility for the historic environment goes back to the Ancient Monuments Protection Act 1882. The central government subsequently developed several systems of heritage protection for different types of assets, introducing listing for buildings after the Second World War, and for conservation areas in the 1960s.

In 1983, Secretary of State for the Environment Michael Heseltine gave national responsibility for the historic environment to a semi‑autonomous agency (or "quango") to operate under ministerial guidelines and to government policy. The Historic Buildings and Monuments Commission was formed under the terms of the National Heritage Act 1983 on 1 April 1984. The 1983 Act also dissolved the bodies that had previously provided independent advice – the Ancient Monuments Board for England and the Historic Buildings Council for England – and incorporated those functions into the new body. Soon after, the commission was given the operating name of English Heritage by its first chairman, Lord Montagu of Beaulieu.

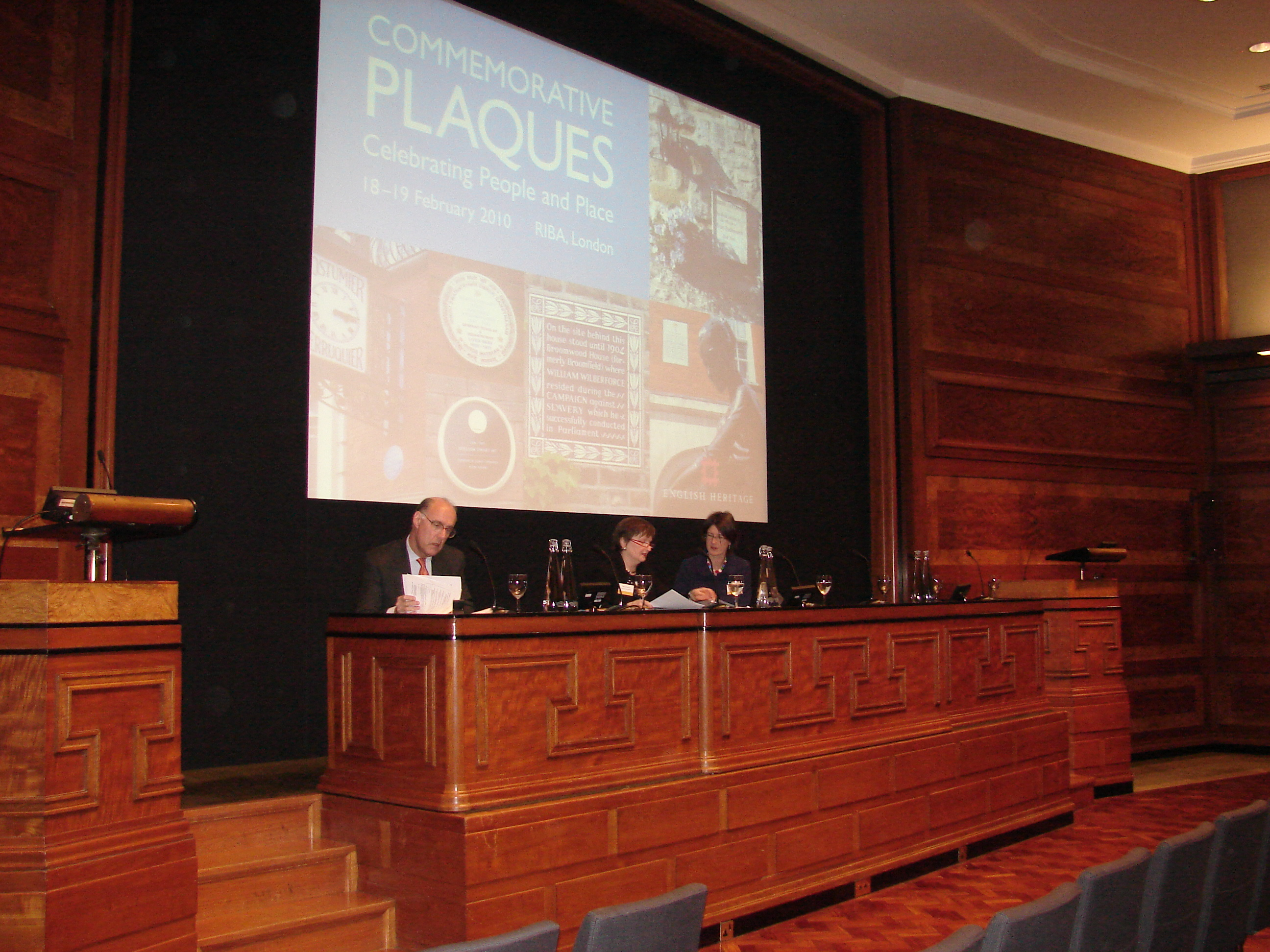
English Heritage commemorative plaques conference, 2010. English Heritage began administering the London blue plaque scheme in 1986.

A national register of historic parks and gardens, (e.g. Rangers House, Greenwich) was set up in 1984, and a register for historic battlefields (e.g. the Battle of Tewkesbury) was created in March 1995. 'Registration' is a material consideration in the planning process. In April 1999 English Heritage merged with the Royal Commission on the Historical Monuments of England (RCHME) and the National Monuments Record (NMR), bringing together resources for the identification and survey of England's historic environment. By adoption, that included responsibility for the national record of archaeological sites from the Ordnance Survey, the National Library of Aerial Photographs, and two million RAF and Ordnance Survey aerial photographs. Those, together with other nationally important external acquisitions, meant that English Heritage was one of the largest publicly accessible archives in the UK: 2.53 million records are available online, including more than 426,000 images. In 2010–11, it recorded 4.3 million unique online user sessions and over 110,000 people visited NMR exhibitions held around the country in 2009–10. In 2012, the section responsible for archive collections was renamed the English Heritage Archive.

As a result of the National Heritage Act 2002, English Heritage acquired administrative responsibility for historic wrecks and submerged landscapes within 12 miles (19 km) of the English coast. The administration of the listed building system was transferred from DCMS to English Heritage in 2006. However, actual listing decisions still remained the responsibility of the Secretary of State for Culture, Media and Sport, who was required by the Planning (Listed Buildings and Conservation Areas) Act 1990 to approve a list of buildings of special architectural or historic interest.

Following the Public Bodies Reform in 2010, English Heritage was confirmed as the government's statutory adviser on the historic environment, and the largest source of non-lottery grant funding for heritage assets. It was retained on grounds of "performing a technical function which should remain independent from Government". However, the department also suffered from budget cuts during the recession of the 2010s, resulting in a repairs deficit of £100 million.

=== Charitable trust ===
In June 2013 the British Government announced plans to provide an £80 million grant to enable English Heritage to become a self-financing charity (roughly following the precedent set by the transformation of the nationally owned British Waterways into the Canal & River Trust). The national portfolio of historic properties remain in public ownership, but the new English Heritage will be licensed to manage them.

The change occurred on 1 April 2015 with the statutory planning and heritage protection functions remaining an independent, non-departmental public body, rebranded as Historic England. The care of the properties in the National Collection and the visitor experience attached to them were transferred to the new English Heritage Trust, although the English Heritage name and logo remains. The trust has a licence to operate the properties until at least 2035.

== National Collection ==
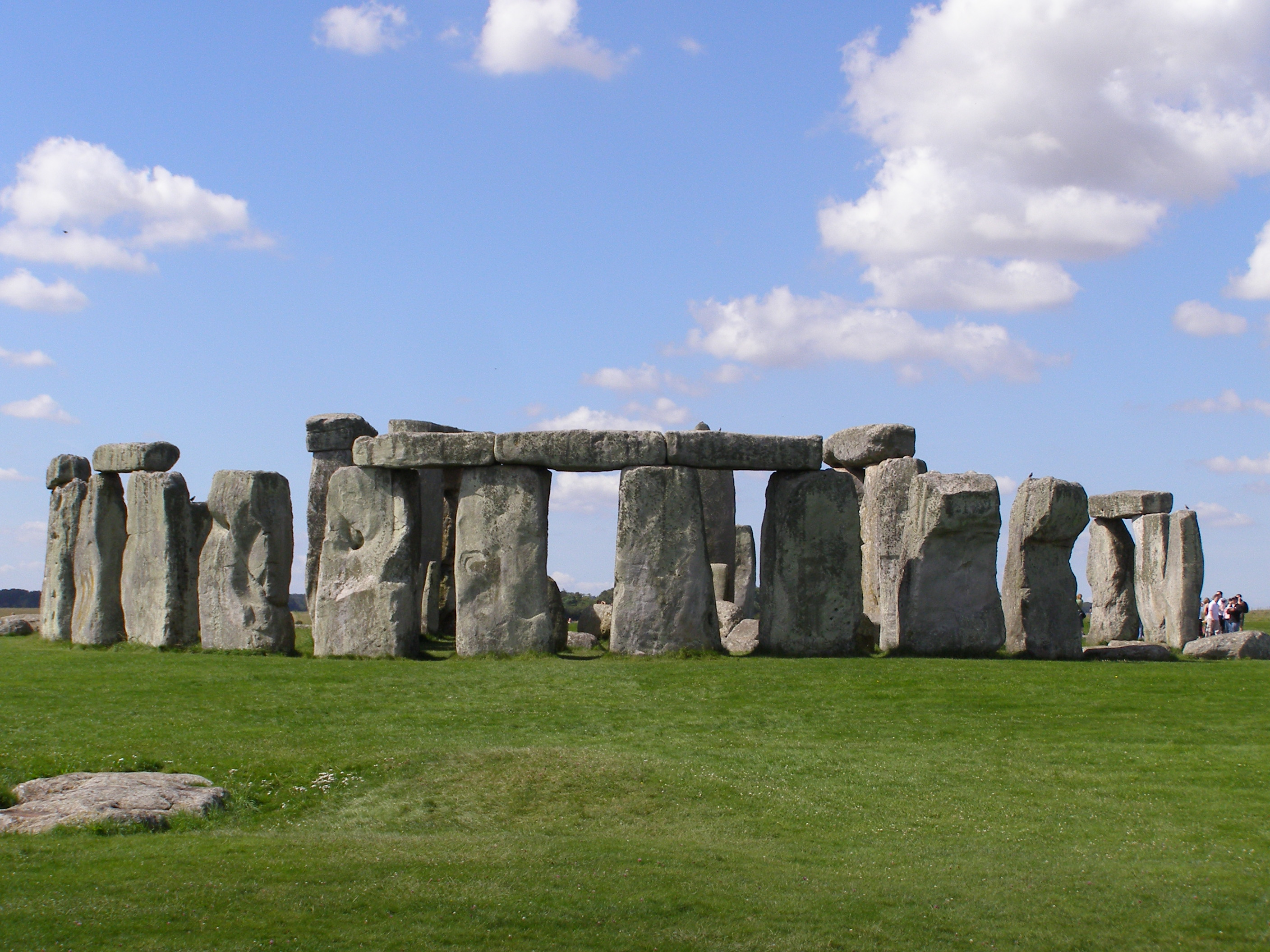
Stonehenge is one of English Heritage's best-known sites.

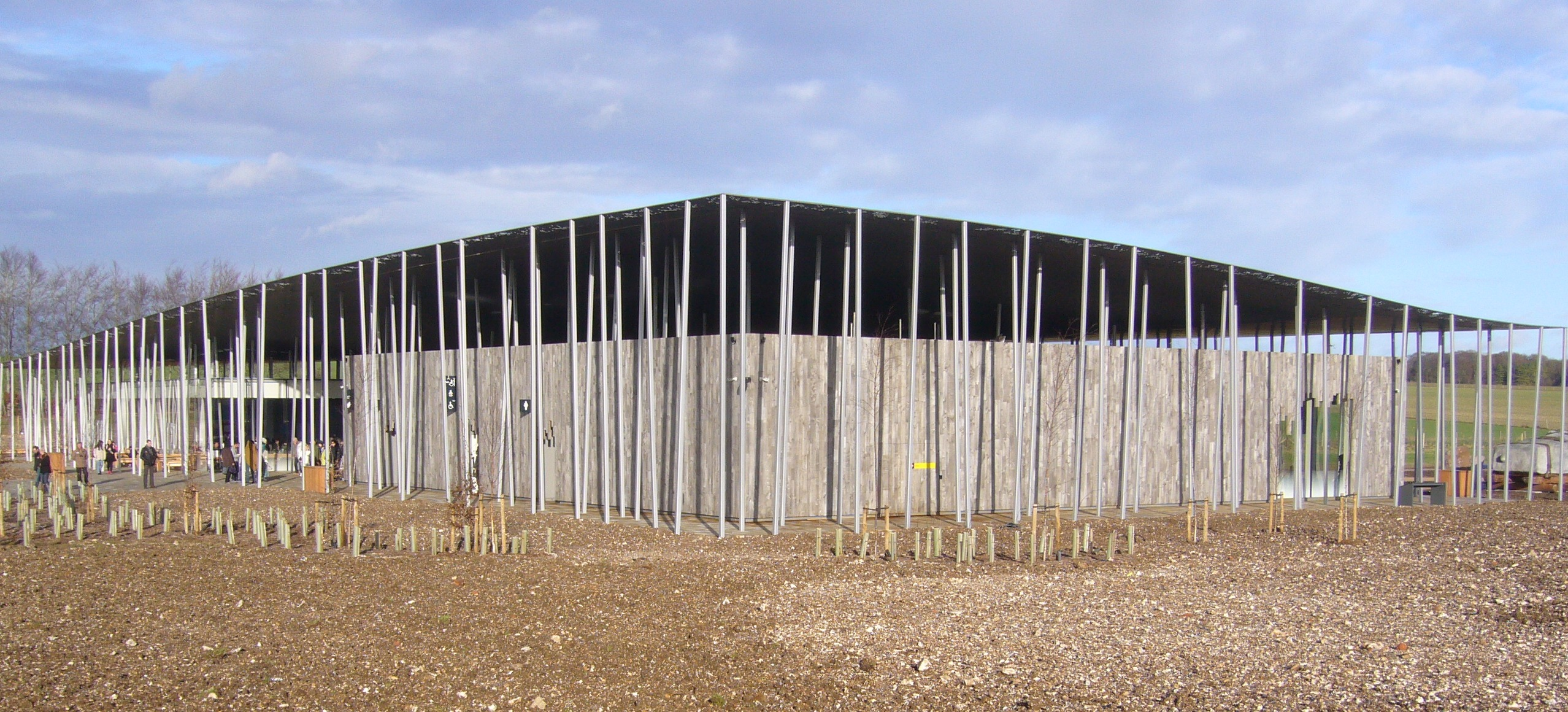
The Stonehenge visitor centre was opened in December 2013, some 1.4 mi (2.3 km) west of the monument.

English Heritage is the guardian of over 400 sites and monuments, the most famous of which include Stonehenge, Osborne, Iron Bridge, Tintagel Castle, and Dover Castle. Whilst many have an entry charge, more than 250 properties are free to enter including Maiden Castle, Dorset and St Catherine's Oratory.

The sites are part of the portfolio of over 880 historical places across the UK amassed by the British Government between the 1880s and the 1970s to form the National Collection of built and archaeological heritage. (The balance is in the care of Historic Scotland and Cadw.) These sites represent a deliberate attempt by the state in the 19th and early 20th century to take the nation's most significant prehistoric sites and medieval sites, which were no longer in active use, into public ownership. This national property collection performs the same function as pictures in the National Gallery and the archaeological material in the British Museum.

Unlike the National Trust, English Heritage holds few furnished properties, although Charles Darwin's home at Down, Kent (where he wrote On the Origin of Species) and Brodsworth Hall, South Yorkshire are major exceptions to this. New sites are rarely added to the collection as other charities and institutions are now encouraged to care for them and open them to the public. Recent acquisitions include Harmondsworth Barn in west London, close to Heathrow airport, in late 2011 and Carrawburgh Roman Fort in January 2020.

The properties are held by English Heritage under various arrangements. The majority are in the guardianship of the Secretary of State for the Department for Culture, Media and Sport, with the freehold being retained by the owner. The remaining properties are owned either by English Heritage, other government departments or the Crown Estate.

In 2013–14 there were 5.73 million visits to staffed sites, with 713,000 free educational visits to sites, collections and tailored learning activities and resources.

In February 2024, English Heritage reported that the previous year had seen record numbers of families visiting their sites, with numbers up 50% over the past decade. 2023 also proved to be a record-breaking year for a number of sites, such as Tintagel Castle.

== Selected collection highlights ==
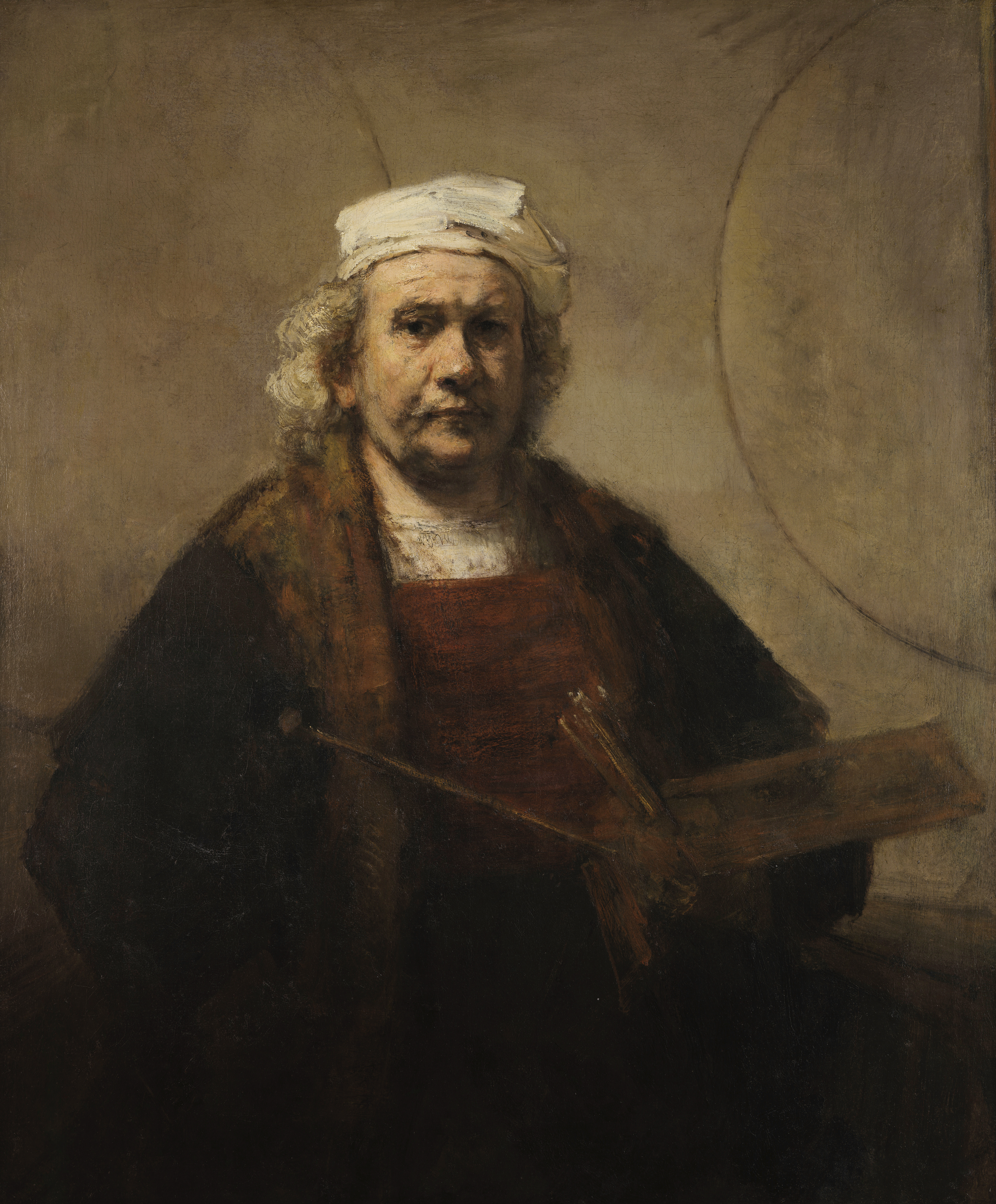
Rembrandt: Self-Portrait with Two Circles

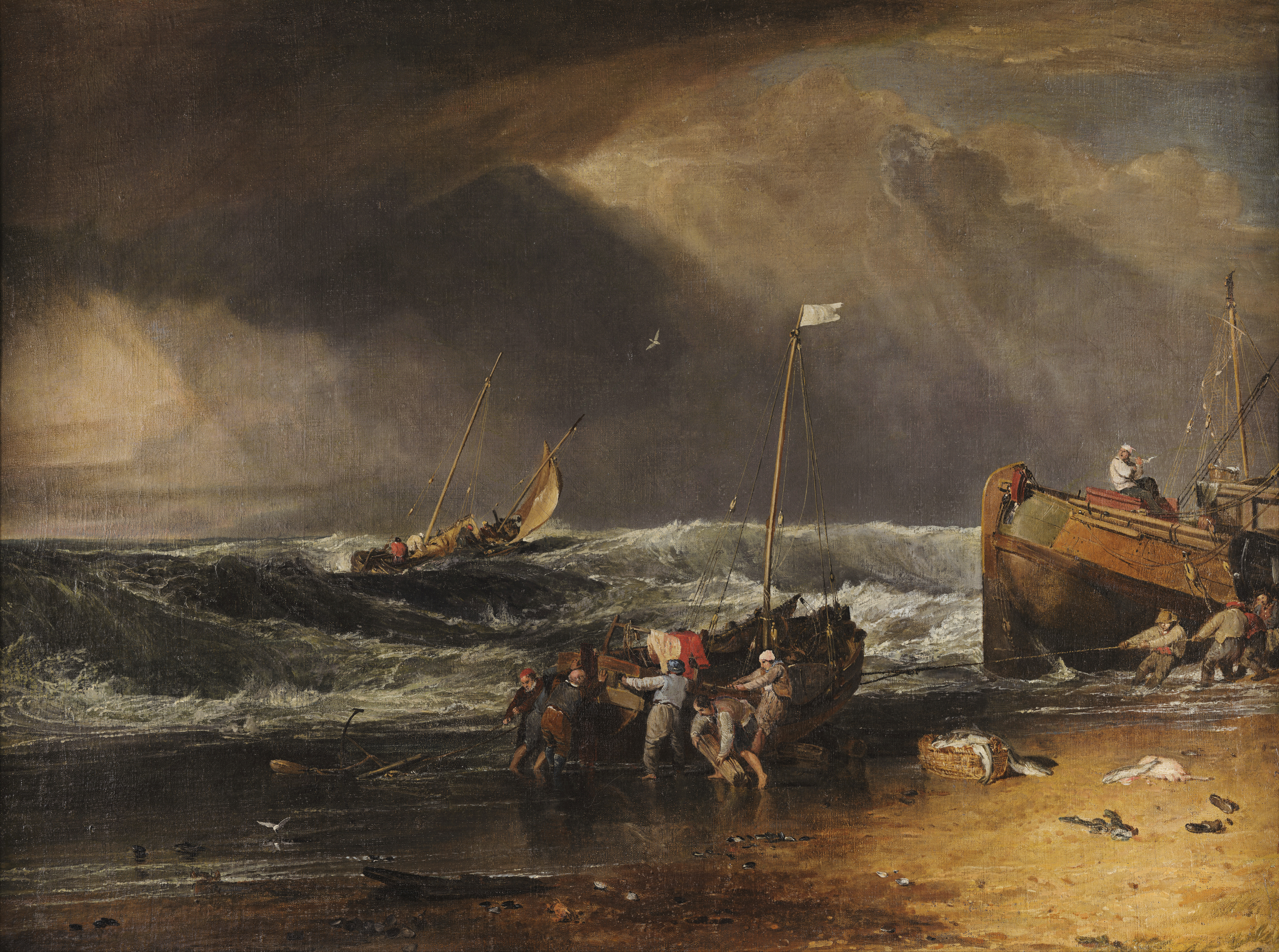
J. M. W. Turner: A Coast Scene with Fishermen Hauling a Boat Ashore

== Funding ==
As a charitable trust, English Heritage relies on the income generated from admission fees to its properties, membership fees and trading income from (e.g.) catering, holiday cottages and shops. It also has income from fundraising and grants. To ease the transition, the government has supplied a total of £80 million in yearly subsidies until 2023 to cover the backlog of maintenance to the sites in English Heritage's care.

Previously, when English Heritage was a non-departmental public body and included the functions of planning, listing, awarding grants, heritage research and advice, most of its funding came from government. In 2013–2014, English Heritage had a total income of £186.55 million, of which £99.85 million came from grant-in-aid, with the remaining £86.7 million from earned sources. This included £17.47 million from property admissions, £14.96 million from catering and retail, £22.91 million from membership and £26.39 million from donations and grants.

The trust's financial plan saw the annual requirement for subsidy being cut from £15.6 million in 2015/16 to £10.1 million in 2020/21 and zero in 2022/23.

== Membership ==
Members of the public are encouraged to join English Heritage as "members". Membership provides benefits such as free admission to its properties and member-only events as well as reduced-cost admission to associated properties. Members also get access for free or reduced cost to properties managed by Cadw in Wales, Historic Scotland, the Office of Public Works in the Republic of Ireland, Manx National Heritage on the Isle of Man and Heritage New Zealand. In 2014/15 there were 1.34 million members. However, membership does not convey voting rights or influence over the way English Heritage is run.

Participation in consultations and web-based surveys by English Heritage is not restricted to its membership. It invites various groups and members of the public to give views on specific issues, most notably in recent years about the Stonehenge road tunnel project proposals.

== Volunteering ==
The organisation welcomes volunteers. Roles range from room stewarding, running education workshops and gardening, to curatorial cleaning and research.

In 2014/15 the number of regular volunteers reached 1,872, up from 1,473 in 2013/14.

=== 1066 March ===
In 2016, to mark the 950th anniversary of the Battle of Hastings and the Norman Conquest of 1066, English Heritage organised the 1066 March from Clifford's Tower in York to Battle Abbey in East Sussex. A team of volunteers led by Nigel Amos and composed of Dominic Sewell, Brian Mahoney, Joshua Powell, William Ballance, Lucy Amos, Karlos Moir, Clive Hart and Matthew Clarke, completed the journey over 3 weeks, arriving at Battle Abbey on 14 October 2016.

== Management and governance ==
English Heritage is governed by a trustee board who set the strategic direction of the organisation and ensure that the organisation delivers its goals and objectives. It is led by the chairman, currently Gerard Lemos. Other trustees are Sarah Staniforth, Vicky Barnsley, Kay Boycott, Liz Bromley, Tony Cates, Tanvi Gokhale, Sir Laurie Magnus, Kunle Olulode, Sue Wilkinson and William Whyte.

Operational management is delegated to the chief executive, Nick Merriman. The chief executive is supported by an executive board of eight directors.

In 2013/14, prior to becoming a charity, English Heritage employed 2,578 staff.

== Blue plaque ==
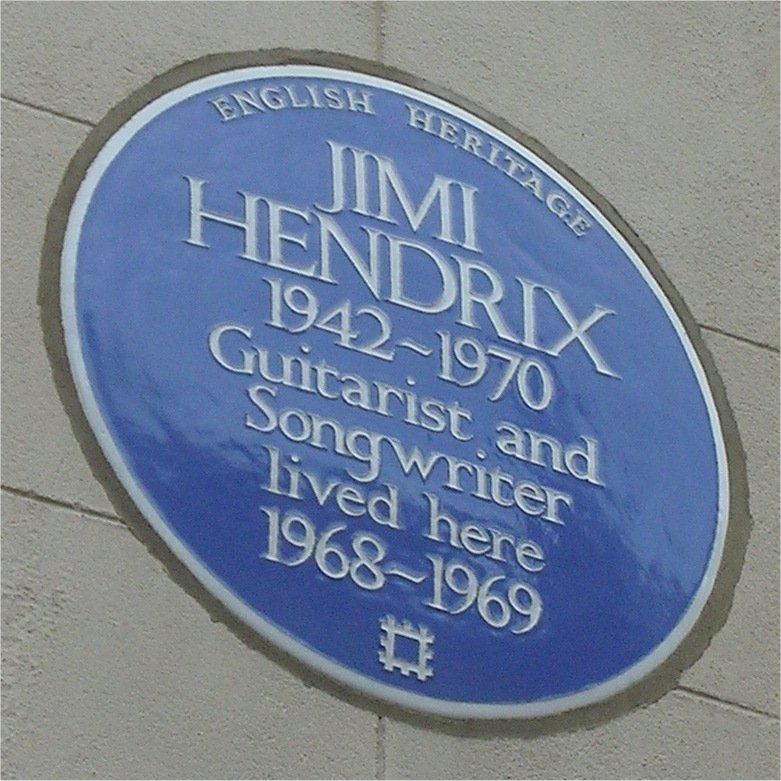
An English Heritage blue plaque, here marking the former London residence of guitarist Jimi Hendrix at 23 Brook Street, London

English Heritage has administered the blue plaque scheme in London since 1986. The plaques mark buildings in the capital that were the homes of (or otherwise associated with) people of historical significance. The scheme remains the responsibility of English Heritage following the transfer to the voluntary sector in 2015.

For a short period from 1998 English Heritage trialled plaques outside the Greater London area. Plaques were erected in Merseyside, Birmingham and elsewhere; but the scheme was discontinued in 2005.

Many other plaques, sometimes informally described as "blue plaques", have been erected throughout the UK (including London) by town councils, district councils, civic societies, historical societies, fan clubs, companies, and individuals. These are not managed by and do not require approval from English Heritage. An open register is available at Open Plaques.

== Controversies ==
=== English Heritage sites in Cornwall ===
In 1999 a pressure group, the Revived Cornish Stannary Parliament, wrote to English Heritage asking them to remove all signs bearing their name from Cornish sites by July 1999 as they regarded the ancient sites as Cornish heritage, not English. Over a period of eleven months members of the Cornish Stannary removed 18 signs and a letter was sent to English Heritage saying "The signs have been confiscated and held as evidence of English cultural aggression in Cornwall. Such racially motivated signs are deeply offensive and cause distress to many Cornish people". On 18 January 2002, at Truro Crown Court, after the prosecution successfully applied for a Public Immunity Certificate to suppress defence evidence (these are normally issued in cases involving national security), three members of the group agreed to return the signs and pay £4,500 in compensation to English Heritage and to be bound over to keep the peace. In return, the prosecution dropped charges of conspiracy to cause criminal damage.

In 2011, George Eustice, Conservative MP for the Cornish constituency of Camborne and Redruth, stated that Cornish heritage "is not English" and that there is "a growing feeling that Cornwall should have its own heritage organisation, taking over from English Heritage". He suggested that English Heritage be replaced "with a Cornish Heritage group, just like they have for instance in Wales and Scotland". The then Culture Secretary Jeremy Hunt was called upon to give cash to a new autonomous body in Cornwall by "top slicing" English Heritage's budget. The Cornish Heritage Trust manages a number of sites on behalf of English Heritage.

To avoid damage, English Heritage signs in Cornwall tend not to have the organisation's name, instead bearing just its logo or no logo at all. The name of the heritage site is also often bilingual in Cornish.

Sign outside Chysauster Ancient Village without the English Heritage name or logo

A similar sign outside Restormel Castle

=== Fortress House ===
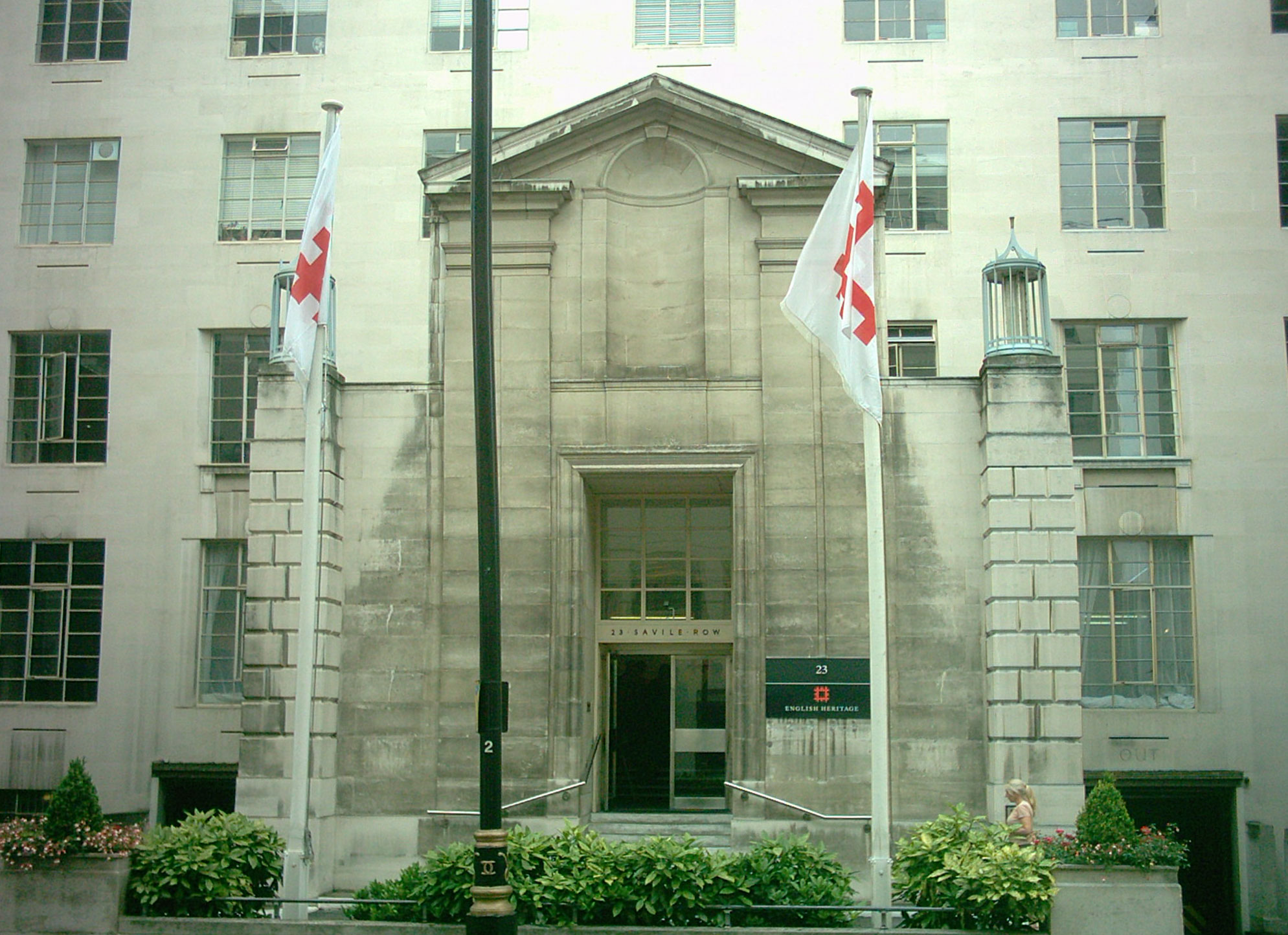
Fortress House: the former London headquarters of English Heritage at 23 Savile Row, now demolished

In 2006, the Secretary of State at the DCMS issued a certificate of exemption from listing for Fortress House, the then English Heritage headquarters. In 2009, it was demolished and the site redeveloped for a commercial office building.

=== Photography ===
In 2010 the organisation sent an email to open access photograph agency fotoLibra, attempting to ban the unauthorised commercial use of photographs of Stonehenge. A subsequent statement of regret was issued, clarifying that "We do not control the copyright of all images of Stonehenge and have never tried to do so." The organisation added that they request that commercial photographers pay fees and abide by certain conditions.

== Youth engagement ==
Since 2018, English Heritage's successful national youth engagement project, Shout Out Loud, has provided a platform for young people to explore heritage sites and collections across England, helping them to uncover untold stories from our past. By amplifying their voices, the now permanent youth engagement programme continues to put young people's ideas and stories at the heart of English Heritage, engendering feelings of inclusion and relevance via increased representation and creative opportunities for involvement. Shout Out Loud was originally funded by the National Lottery Heritage Fund as part of Kick the Dust.

Shout Out Loud established a successful consortium of partners between 2018 and 2022 including Photoworks, the Council for British Archaeology, National Youth Theatre and Sound Connections. A number of high-profile projects were delivered with these partners including: Reverberate, a project aimed at connecting grassroot youth organisations with their local heritage (with Sound Connections); England's New Lenses, a photography project resulting in new bodies of work connected to English Heritage sites from four emerging photographers (with Photoworks); 'The Ancestors', a performance based project exploring Black prisoners of War at Portchester Castle (with the National Youth Theatre and Warwick University) and 'Our House', exploring LGBTQ+ history at Eltham Palace (with the National Youth Theatre and Metro Charity); 'From Ordinary to Extraordinary', a project supporting national Young Archaeologists' Clubs to creatively explore and share their local history with new audiences (with the Council for British Archaeology).

Shout Out Loud was awarded the 2019 UK Heritage Award for Best Event, Festival or Exhibition for 'Our House' and shortlisted for the 2022 Museums and Heritage Award for Community Engagement Programme of the Year for the programme as a whole.

Young People are able to get involved with the ongoing youth engagement programme via online mass participation projects, creative residency or participation opportunities (often shared on the dedicated Instagram channel @eh_shoutoutloud), via projects as part of a youth group, or by joining one of the ongoing schemes 'Young Associates' (ages 16–25, no application necessary, join at any time) or Young Producers (ages 18–25, applications open once a year). Paid six month placement opportunities are also available once or twice per year. Previous placement holders have gone on to positions with the BBC, The National Archives, Netflix, Warner Brothers and the National Trust.

== See also ==
- Battle of the Beanfield
- Castles in Great Britain and Ireland
- Festival of History
- Historic Chapels Trust
- List of English Heritage properties
- List of monastic houses in England

=== Similar organisations ===
- Cadw
- Historic Environment Scotland
- Manx National Heritage
- National Trust for Places of Historic Interest or Natural Beauty
