= Fred Patton =

American politician

Member of the Kansas House of Representatives from the 50th district
- In office January 12, 2015 – September 25, 2023
- Preceded by: Josh Powell
- Succeeded by: Kyle McNorton

Personal details
- Born: March 3, 1974 (age 52)
- Party: Republican
- Spouse: Kim
- Children: 3
- Education: Washburn University; University of Kansas

Frederick "Fred" Colovin Patton (born March 3, 1974) is an American politician who represented the 50th District in the Kansas House of Representatives from January 12, 2015, to October 16, 2023. He was first elected to the House of Representatives in November 2014.

Before his resignation, he served as the chairman of the House Judiciary Committee and of the House Rules and Journal Committee. Patton also served on the House Capitol Preservation Committee, the Corrections & Juvenile Justice Committee, and the House Redistricting Committee. He previously served as chairman of the Joint Special Committee on Kansas Emergency Management Act and the House K-12 Budget Committee and as vice-chairman of the House Judiciary Committee and the Joint Special Committee on Judiciary.

Patton also served on the Seaman U.S.D. 345 Board of Education. He was first elected to the school board in 2003. He served five terms as president of the board. Patton served as president of the Kansas Association of School Boards from 2010 to 2012.

Patton has been married to Kim Patton, a library media specialist at North Fairview Elementary School, since 1997. They live in Topeka, Kansas with their three children.
