= Boleigh Fogou =

Fogou in Cornwall, England

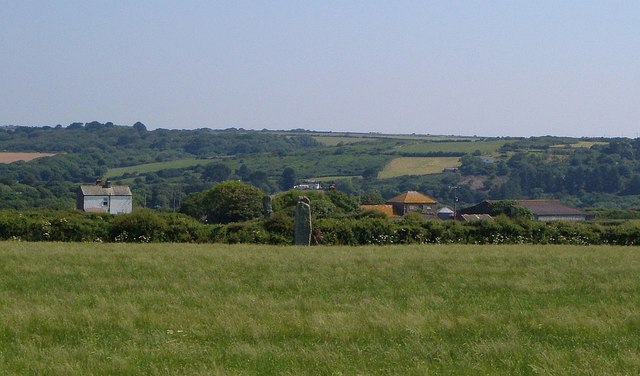
- The Pipers standing stones near Boleigh Fogou

- Location within Southwest Cornwall
- 50.0715°N 5.5829°W
- Type: Fogou
- Periods: Iron Age / Romano-British
- Location: Cornwall

Boleigh Fogou is a fogou near St. Buryan in Cornwall, England. Iron Age pottery was found at the fogou along with carvings that may have been brought from elsewhere. It is unusual in structure as it has more than one entranceway.

The Boleigh fogou was the subject of a 1996 episode of Channel 4's Time Team.
