= Fogou =

Ancient dry-stone underground structures in Cornwall, England

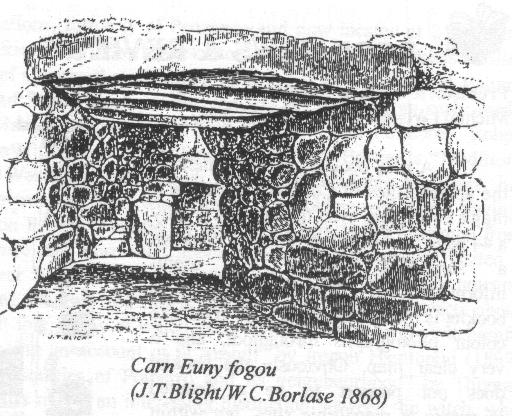
A view inside the fogou at Carn Euny in 1868

A fogou or fougou (pronounced "foo-goo") is an underground, dry-stone structure found on Iron Age or Romano-British-defended settlement sites in Cornwall, England. The original purpose of a fogou is uncertain today. Colloquially called vugs, vows, foggos, giant holts, or fuggy holes in various dialects, fogous have similarities with souterrains or earth-houses of northern Europe and particularly Scotland, including Orkney. Fewer than 15 confirmed fogous have been found.

== Construction ==
Fogous consist of a buried, usually corbelled stone wall, tapering at the top and capped by stone slabs. They were mainly constructed by excavating a sloping trench about 5 ft (1.5 m) wide and 6 ft (1.8 m) deep, lining it with drystone walling as stated, which was battered inwards and roofed with flat slabs; soil from excavation was heaped on top as at Pendeen Vau or incorporated in the rampart of the enclosure as at Halliggye Fogou, Trelowarren.

== Function ==
It has been conjectured that they were made as refuges, or for religious purposes, or for food storage.

Fogous' central locations inside settlements and the work that evidently went into constructing them indicates their importance to the community, but their original purpose is no longer known. Many are oriented southwest–northeast, with the opening facing the prevailing wind. Excavated examples at Halliggye, Carn Euny, and Boden suggest fogous may have been deliberately filled back in after use, or upon abandonment of the surrounding settlement.

Iron-age ritual use seems unlikely, given the Celtic druids' known custom of worship in outdoor spaces open to the sky.

=== Refuge hypothesis ===
Currently, both documentary and subsequent archaeological evidence support their use as refuges, possibly to survive raids, as first suggested by Kenneth MacGregor (2004).

Nancy Edwards wrote that "evidence would support this: Creeps, hidden chambers, and sally ports, as well as the fact that most souterrains were invisible above ground, would all have helped to provide protection in the case of sudden attack. They could, however, turn into death-traps if the aggression was prolonged."

=== Cold storage hypothesis ===
Although in their present damp condition, use for food storage seems impractical, Diodorus Siculus stated that Iron Age people in Britain stored their grain in "underground repositories", adding contemporary evidence to speculation that their main purpose was food storage. Where they were open at both ends, a fogou could provide suitable conditions for storing some foods, especially the drying of meat, or storage of dairy products such as milk, butter, and cheese where natural moulds would assist in preservation of perishable foodstuffs.

Ashpits found at Trewardreva and in the circular side-chamber at Carn Euny were probably for preserving gulls' eggs, as was done on Saint Kilda in Scotland. A layer of black greasy mould with charcoal, animal and bird bones at Treveneague is also very suggestive of food storage.

== Etymology ==
The word may be related to the Cornish words fow (plural fowys) and/or gogow (plural gogowyow), both meaning "cave". In the past, locals in Cornwall have called them "fuggy-holes" but this term is seldom used today.

== History and archaeology ==
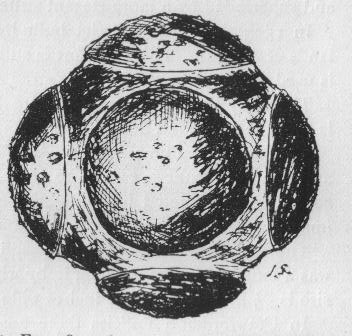
A carved stone ball (petrosphere) found at Jock's Thorn farm in Kilmaurs, East Ayrshire, Scotland.

One function of the souterrains of Gaul and early medieval Ireland is to hide in boltholes to escape detection by raiders. Fogous may have had a similar function to the underground kivas of the Puebloans.

Other underground structures such as "earth houses" or souterrains have some similarities with fogous. An example of an excavated souterrain is the site at Rosal, Strathnaver, Sutherland. In this example no finds were made inside the structure and the roof may have been only partially covered with stones, a timber roof being present on part of it. It was suggested that souterrains could have been used as barns. Fogous are often associated with dwellings such as Iron Age villages.

Petrospheres or "stone balls" have been found in souterrains and, as possible symbols of power within prehistoric society, this discovery suggest a use other than basic storage of food and resources.

Two fogous have been excavated by Time Team, Boleigh Fogou in Series 3 (1995) and Boden Vean in Series 21 (2021).

== Sites ==
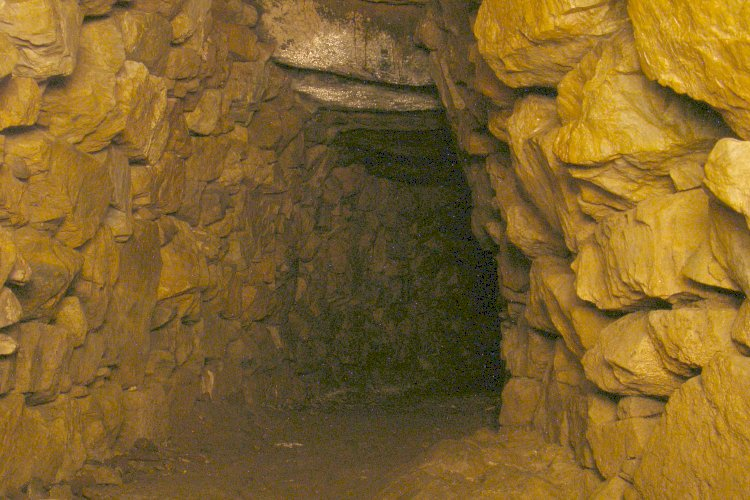
Inside the main chamber of Halliggye Fogou, Trelowarren, Cornwall

Halliggye Fogou on the Trelowarren estate is generally accepted to be the largest and best surviving fogou.

Other unspoiled fogous survive at Carn Euny, Boleigh Fogou near Lamorna, Pendeen Vau and Trewardreva near Constantine, the last of which is known locally as Pixie's Hall or Piskey Hall.

Partially destroyed fogous exist at Chysauster, which is in the care of English Heritage and which has been blocked up for safety; at Boden Vean near Manaccan and at Lower Boscaswell close to Pendeen.

Evidence of possible former fogous can be found at Porthmeor; at Higher Bodinar; at Castallack and at Treveneague. Another was found during rescue excavations at Penhale Round on the A30, the most easterly example, but this has since been destroyed.

== See also ==
- Petrosomatoglyph – Supposed image of parts of a human or animal body in rock symbolism
- Kiva – Room used by Puebloans for religious rituals and political meetings
- Erdstall – Type of tunnel found across Europe
- Castle Bloody – Prehistoric feature on the island of Shapinsay, Scotland

== Bibliography ==
- May, Jo (1996). Fogou – A Journey into the Underworld. Gothic Image Publications. ISBN 0-906362-34-2.
- Rowe, Toni-maree (2005). Cornwall in prehistory. Tempus Publishing Limited. pp. 127–132. ISBN 0-7524-3440-3.
- Weatherhill, Craig (1985). Cornovia – Ancient Sites of Cornwall & Scilly. Cornwall Books. p. 135. ISBN 1-871060-31-1.
- Weatherhill, Craig (1981). Belerion – Ancient Sites of Land's End. Alison Hodge. p. 87. ISBN 0-906720-01-X.
- Cooke, Ian (1987). Journey to the Stones – Mermaid to the Merrymaid. p. 160. ISBN 0-9512371-1-X.
