= Josh Powell (politician) =

American politician

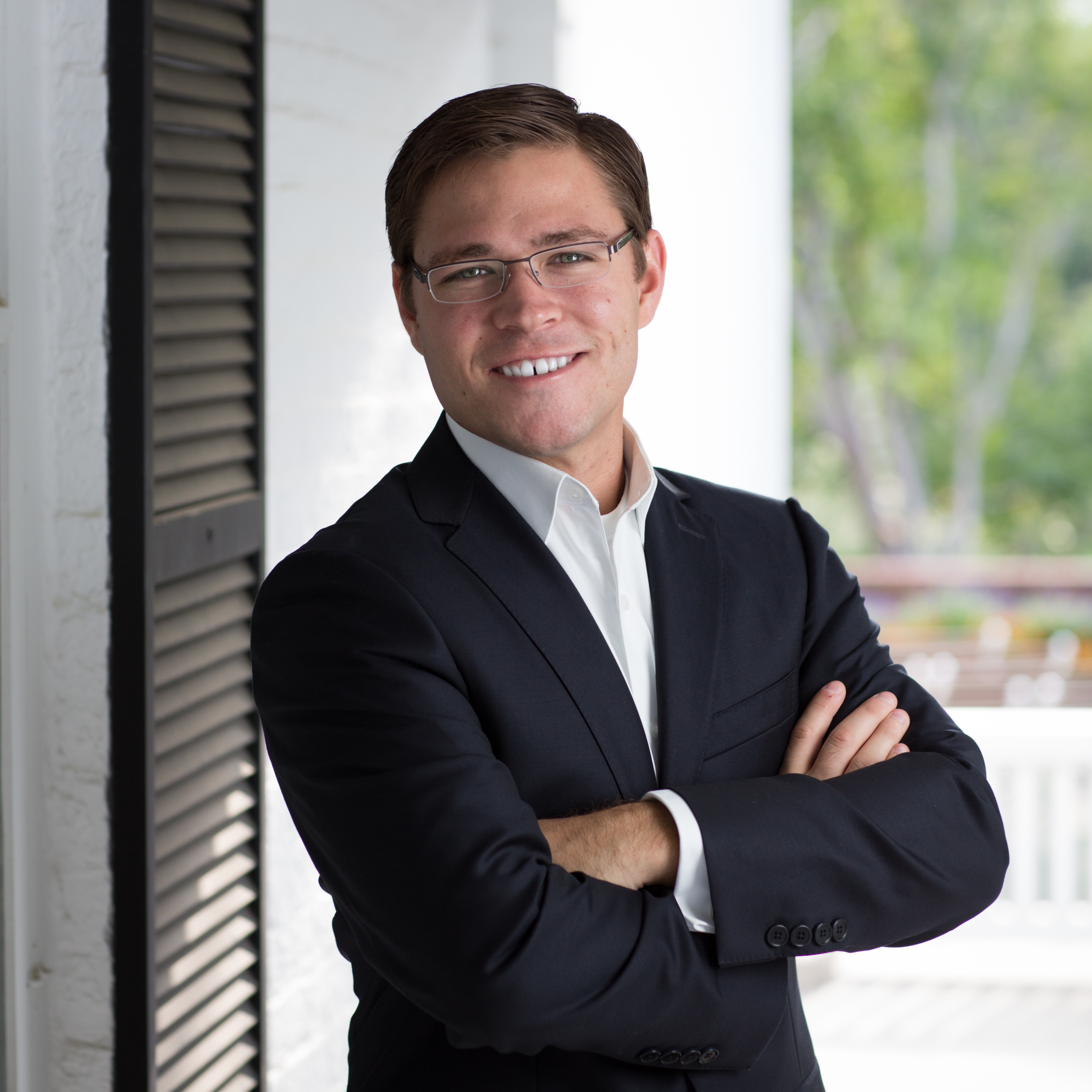

Member of the Kansas House of Representatives from the 50th district
- In office January 14, 2013 – January 12, 2015
- Preceded by: Trent LeDoux
- Succeeded by: Fred Patton

Personal details
- Born: March 14, 1986 (age 40) Topeka, Kansas, U.S.
- Party: Republican
- Spouse: Joanna Powell

Josh Powell is an American politician who served as a Republican member of the Kansas House of Representatives, representing the 50th district from 2013 to 2015.

== Committee Membership ==
- Commerce, Labor and Economic Development
- Energy and Environment
- Taxation

== Electoral history ==
2012 Republican primary

Republican Primary results, August 7, 2012
Party	Candidate	Votes	%
Republican	Joshua Powell	1,641	57.8
Republican	Jason "Jake" Fisher	1,195	42.1
Total votes		2,836	100

2012 General Election

General Election results, November 2, 2012
Party	Candidate	Votes	%
Republican	Joshua Powell	5,986	54.9
Democratic	Sean Gatewood	4,913	45.0
Total votes		10,899	100
