= Erdstall =

Type of tunnel found across Europe

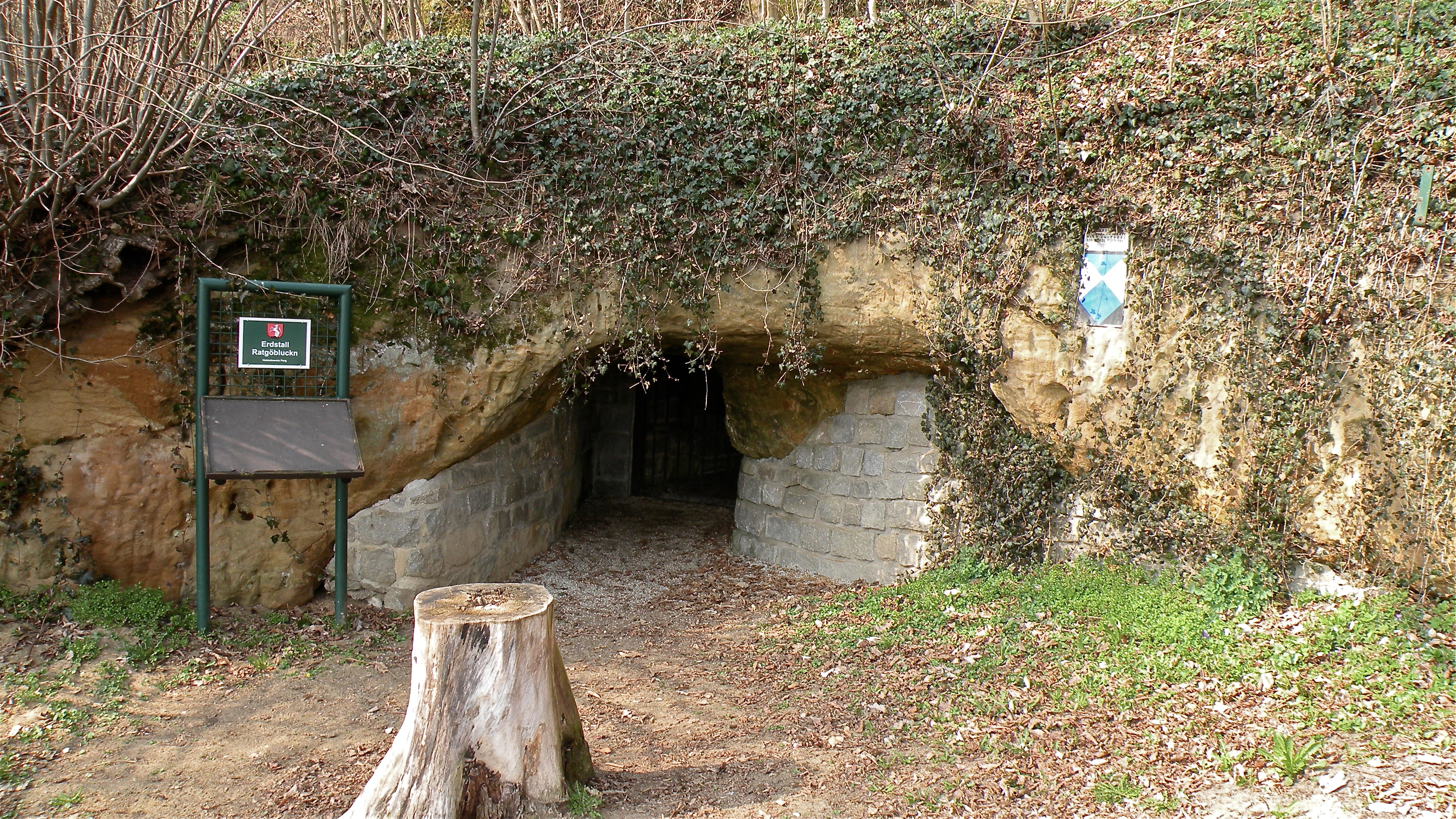
Entry to the Ratgöbluckn erdstall at Perg, Austria–its passages are high enough for tourists to access (electric lights since 2002).

An erdstall is a type of tunnel found across Europe. They are of unknown origin but are believed to date from the Middle Ages. A variety of purposes have been theorized, including that they were used as escape routes or hiding places, but the most prominent theory is that they served a religious or spiritual purpose.

== Etymology ==
The word Erdstall is derived from the medieval (Middle High German) forms of German Erde ("earth") and either Stelle ("place") or 'Stollen' ("mineshaft"). There are very few historical references—a document from 1449 names the area above the tunnels as 'auf den erdstelln'.

Alternate regional names include "schratzlloch" (Bavaria), "zwergloch", and "grufen" (Austria).

== Construction ==
Erdstalls are very low and narrow—they have a height of 1.0 to 1.4 metres (3 ft 3 in to 4 ft 7 in) and a maximum width of about 60 centimetres (24 in). Additionally, they feature very tight passages connecting one tunnel to a lower tunnel called a "schlupf" (slip out), which are typically extremely narrow and impassable for some, as crawling under the slip hole, and then standing up to slide the shoulders through, is necessary to crawl into the higher tunnel.

There is only one narrow concealed entry point, with no second exit tunnel, as is common with an escape tunnel system. Some tunnel systems feature loop tunnels at the end of a tunnel. Most tunnel systems are no longer than 50 metres (160 ft).

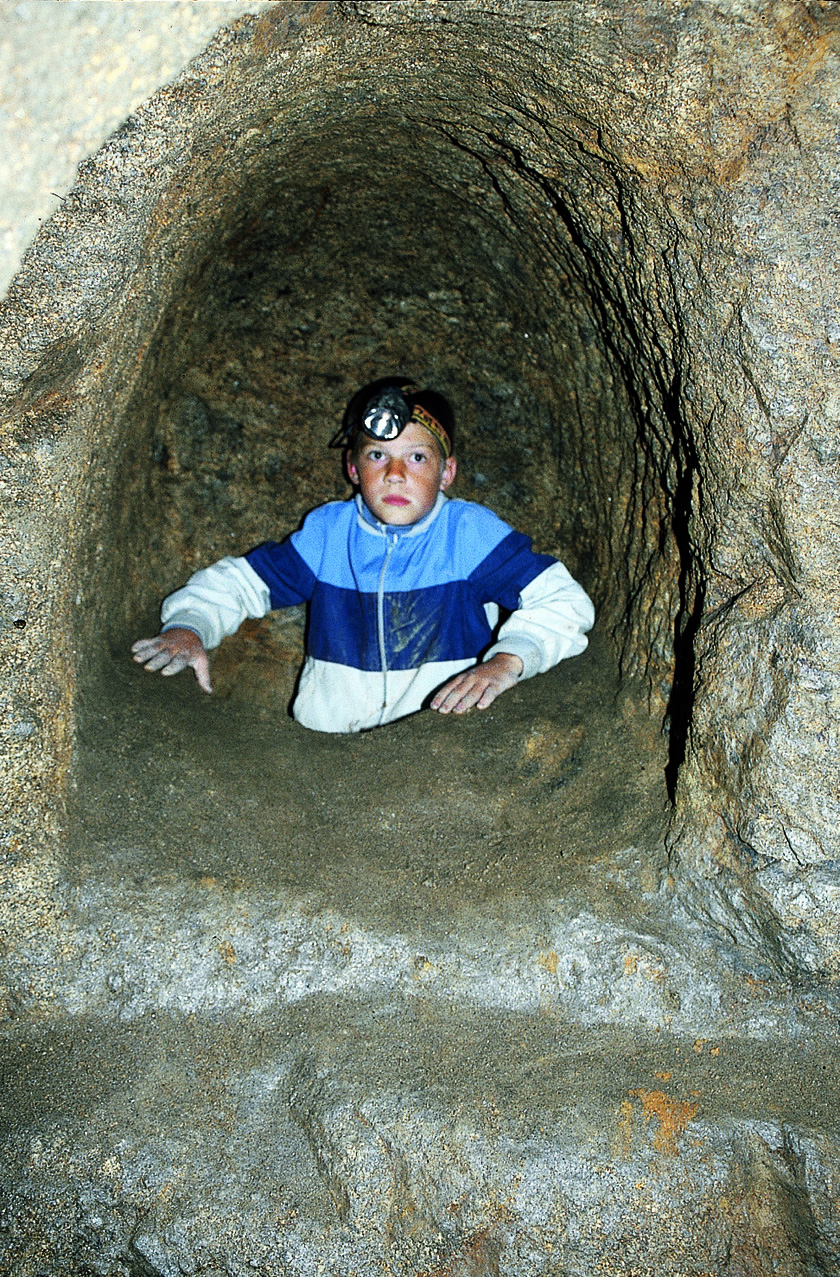
Vertical passage (slip hole)

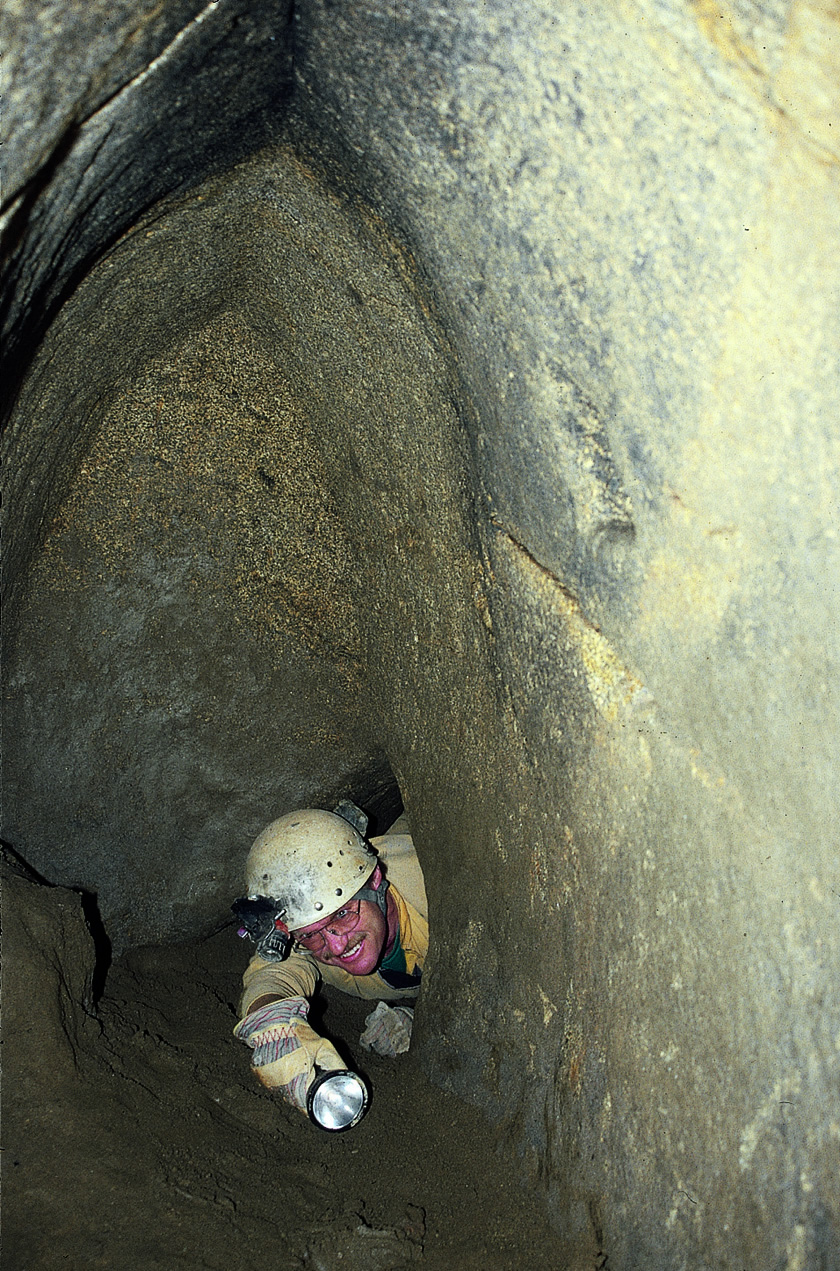
Horizontal passage

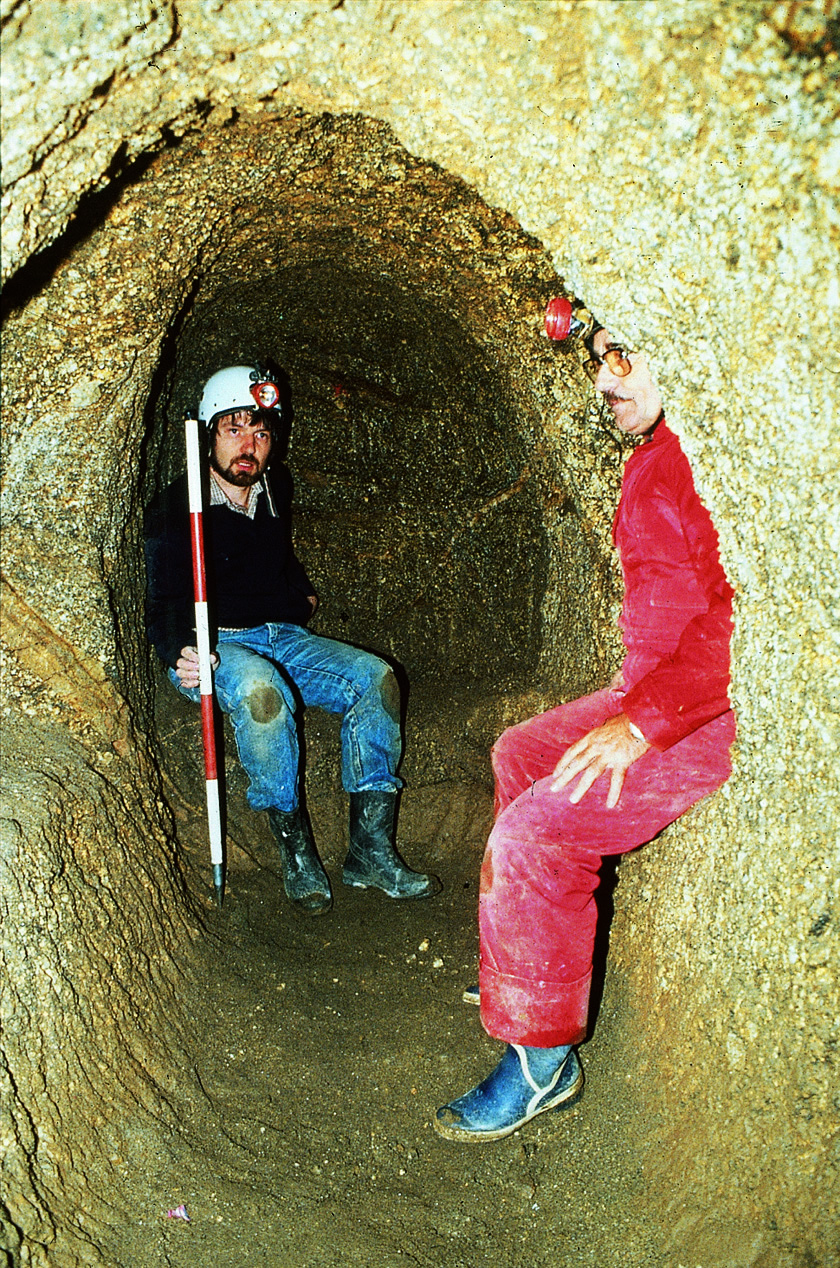
Sitting recess at the end of the tunnel

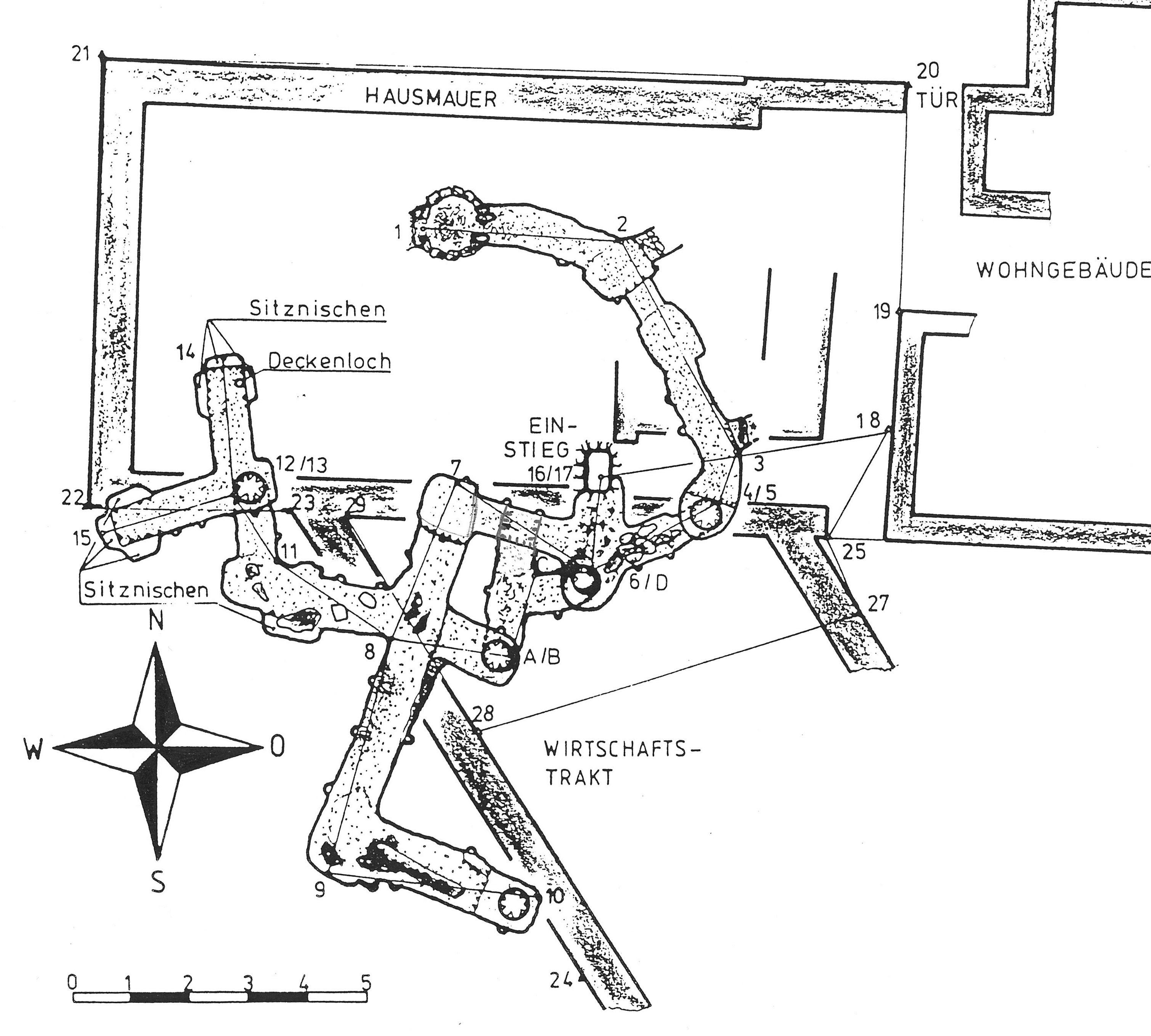
Map of the large erdstall in Bad Zell

=== Classification ===
In his 2000 publication Die Regional-Typisierung der Erdställe, Herbert Wimmer created a rough classification system for varying types of erdstalls:

- Type A has a single long gallery with slip passages and short side slopes
- Type B has multiple levels connected at multiple places by vertical slip passages. Auxiliary construction tunnels have been found that were closed after completion. At the end of each tunnel, seating niches have been cut out, or the tunnel is widened with a longer seating bench.
- Type C has multiple horizontal slip passages, and there is a round-trip tunnel at the end or in the middle that is high enough to walk through upright.
- Type D has multiple chambers that are connected with tunnels. The slip passages are mostly horizontal in this type.

== Archaeology ==
Although erdstalls exist in abundance in Central Europe, with more than 700 in Bavaria alone, there is almost no archaeological material to be found in them. The archaeological evidence is so slim that even age determination is difficult. Coal from a fire pit at Bad Zell has been dated to between 1030 and 1210. Coal from a heading in Höcherlmühle has been dated to between the late 10th and mid-11th century. A slip passage at Rot am See has been enhanced with stones to make it narrower, with the stone additions dated to between 1034 and 1268. Coal from Trebersdorf was dated to 950–1050, and coal from Kühlried was dated to 950–1160. Ceramics found in St. Agatha have been dated to the 12th century, which seems to be the latest date of usage.

== Museums ==
Most erdstall sites are too narrow to be usable for general tourism. A larger, walkable site is the Erdstall Ratgöbluckn in Perg (Upper Austria), which is open to the public as part of the local museum. The Erdstall am Kapellenberg in Großkrut (Lower Austria) was opened in 2007 to visitors of the Erdstallmuseum Althöflein.

== See also ==
- Punarjani Guha – natural tunnel in a rocky cliff in Thiruvilwamala, Kerala, India
- Fogou – ancient dry-stone underground structures in Cornwall, England
- Souterrain – underground structure associated mainly with the Atlantic Iron Age
