= Joshua Powell =

British conservation biologist (born 1993)

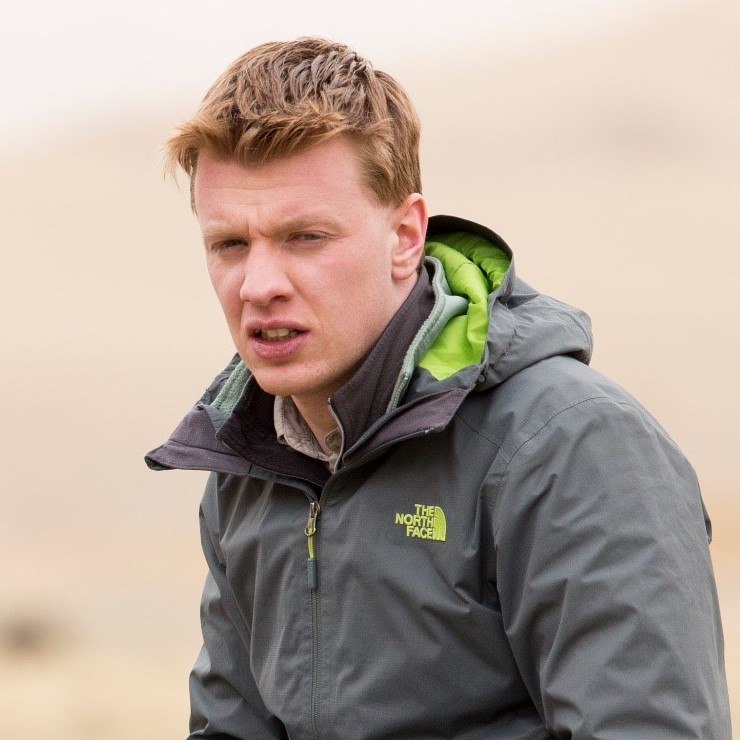
- Powell in Kyrgyzstan
- Born: 16 July 1993 (age 33); Eastbourne, East Sussex, England
- Education: University of Nottingham (BSc); University of Pennsylvania (MES)
- Awards: CF

Joshua John Powell CF (born 16 July 1993) is a British conservation biologist. He is one of the faces of WWF's #WWFVoices campaign on global biodiversity.

== Education ==
Powell attended Cranbrook School, Kent. Powell subsequently attended the University of Nottingham and graduated with a first-class Honours Bachelor of Science degree in geography in 2014, before receiving a Thouron Award to complete his master's degree at the University of Pennsylvania.

== Career ==
Powell received a UK Churchill Fellowship in 2017 to study island conservation strategy in Australia, New Zealand and Fiji, followed by South Georgia and the Falkland Islands. In 2021, Powell produced and featured in Saving Britain's Islands, a short educational film on island conservation, funded by the British Ecological Society. The film featured conservation projects in New Zealand and South Georgia.

Powell then received a grant from the National Geographic Society to establish Rangers Without Borders, a conservation research program he subsequently founded with Peter Coals, a friend from the Wildlife Conservation Research Unit (WildCRU) at the University of Oxford, with Powell becoming a National Geographic Explorer.

Powell is one of the faces of WWF's #WWFVoices campaign on global biodiversity, for which he has hosted series on polar science and Arctic conservation in Svalbard and Arctic Russia, island and marine conservation in the North Atlantic and biodiversity in South Georgia. Powell featured in promotional videos for Earth Hour in 2019 and 2021, appearing alongside other youth advocates and Australian actress, Margot Robbie.

In 2020, Powell became an advisor for The Queen's Commonwealth Trust, a charity that funds, champions and assists the projects of youth advocates throughout the Commonwealth.

== Awards and honours ==
Powell received a UK Churchill Fellowship in 2017, receiving the honorific CF in 2019.

In 2019, Powell was awarded the Scientific Exploration Society's Explorer Award for Inspiration & Scientific Trail-blazing. In 2021, Powell was named one of the Explorers Club 50: Fifty people changing the world.
