= Brane (disambiguation) =

A brane is a spatially extended mathematical concept that appears in M-theory. It may also refer to:

- Brane cosmology, several theories in particle physics and cosmology related to superstring theory and M-theory
- BRANE (acronym for Bombing Radar Navigation Equipment) - the airborne computer built by IBM in the 1950s for the B-52 strategic bomber
- Brane, Cornwall, a hamlet in Cornwall, England, with a chambered tomb known as Brane Barrow
- Brane, archaic name of Bordeaux wine producer Château Brane-Cantenac
- Brane-Mouton, archaic name of Bordeaux wine producer Château Mouton Rothschild
- Branko Oblak (born 1947), Yugoslav/Slovenian football player and manager
- Brane Mozetič (born 1958), Slovenian poet and editor

== See also ==
- Branne (disambiguation)
- Brain
