= Sancreed Beacon =

Archaeological site in Cornwall, England

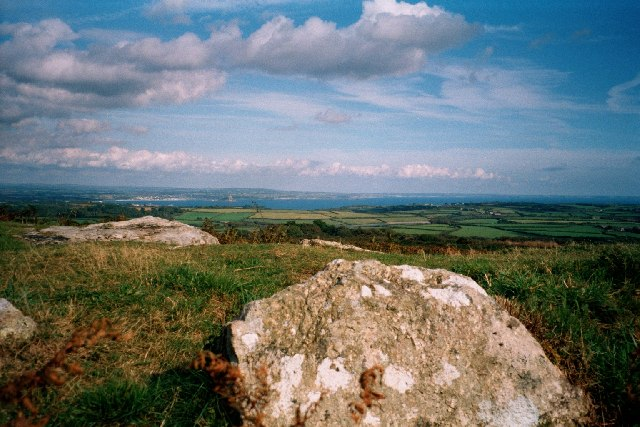

Highest point
- Coordinates: 50°06′33″N 5°37′06″W

Naming
- Native name: Tansys Sankres (Cornish)

Geography
- Location: West Penwith, Cornwall
- OS grid: SW414295
- Topo map: OS Landranger 203, Explorer 102

Sancreed Beacon (Cornish: Tansys Sankres) is a Bronze Age archaeological site near the village of Sancreed in the Penwith peninsula of Cornwall maintained by the Cornwall Heritage Trust. On top of the hill are several stone cists and Bronze Age archaeological remains comprising burial mounds and the remains of a Bronze Age hut on the Western slope.

This site can be taken in the context of a rich variety of archaeological evidence in the vicinity from the Iron Age, Bronze Age and dating as far back as Neolithic times including Carn Euny Iron Age village 1 mile to the southwest, Caer Bran Hill Fort half a mile southwest, Sancreed Holy Well to the southeast, and Bartinney Castle to the west about 1 mile.

== Mining ==
Long linear earthworks between 10 and 16 metre wide, covering 3 hectares are the remains of medieval (or later) opencast tin workings. An 8-metre diameter shaft was also found in an archaeological field survey in 1985. Wheal Argus worked the old lodes between 1873 and 1875 raising 20 ton of black tin. The Ordnance Survey 1:2500 map of 1875 shows the disused engine house of Wheal Argus along with four shafts, a windlass and smithy. By April 1885 the engine of Sancreed Beacon mine, which according to The Cornishman newspaper had been unused for many years and was being transferred to the East Blue Hills Mine at St Agnes. The 1908 Ordnance Survey map refers to the mine as Beacon Hill Mine, showing the position of four shafts but the mine buildings have disappeared.
