= Pilade =

Pilade may refer to:

- Lorenzo Pilat, an Italian singer-songwriter also known as Pilade
- Pilade, a character in the 1819 opera Ermione by Rossini
- Pilade, or Pylades, a character in the 1779 opera Iphigénie en Tauride by Gluck
- HMS Vimiera (1808), formerly French Navy brig Pylade or Pilade

== See also ==
- Pylades, in Greek mythology
- Pilades, a genus of beetles
- HMS Surinam (1804), formerly Batavian corvette or sloop Pilades
- Pilates
