= Scobell =

Scobell is a surname. Notable people with the surname include:

- Edward Scobell (naval officer) (1784–1825), British Royal Navy officer
- Edward Scobell (priest) (1850–1917), Anglican priest
- George Treweeke Scobell (1785–1869), British politician
- Henry Jenner Scobell (1859–1912), British military officer
- Henry Scobell (c. 1610–1660), British official
- John Scobell (1879–1955), British army officer
- Walker Scobell (born 2009), American actor

== See also ==
- Scobell House, residential hall at Carnegie Mellon University
