= Edward Scobell =

Edward Scobell may refer to:

- Edward Scobell (Royal Navy officer) (1784–1825), English naval officer
- Edward Scobell (priest) (1850–1917), English Anglican priest
