= Brane Barrow =

Neolithic entrance grave in Cornwall

- Hirvedh Bosvran (Cornish)
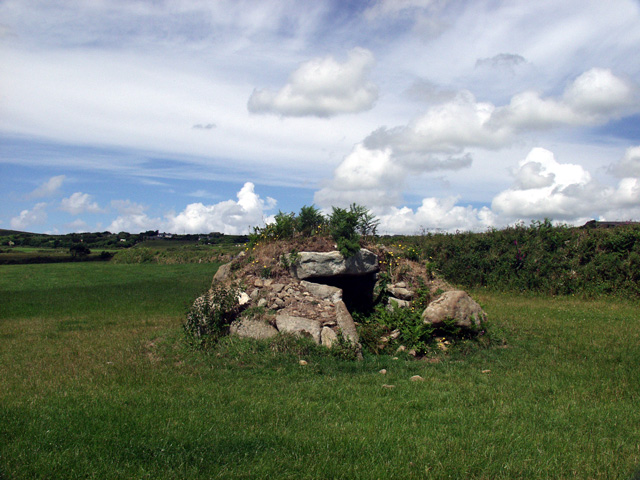
- The entrance grave in 2004
- Interactive map of Brane Barrow
- 50.0968°N 5.6350°W
- Type: Entrance grave
- Location: Penwith, Cornwall

History
- Built: c. 1750 BC

Site notes
- Material: Granite
- Diameter: 6.1 m (20 ft)
- Discovered: 1863 by William Borlase

Brane Barrow (Cornish: Hirvedh Bosvran), or Chapel Euny Barrow, is a Neolithic entrance grave located near the hamlet of Brane, Cornwall, England, United Kingdom. It is considered to be one of the smallest and best preserved burial monuments in Britain.

== History ==
Entrance graves date to the later Neolithic era and Bronze Age (c. 2500-1000 BC). Circular in shape, most entrance graves were built with a mound of heaped rubble and soil, typically up to 82 feet (25m) in diameter. The perimeter of the mound was marked with kerbstone. It held a rectangular chamber built of stone slabs or coursed rubble stone, or a combination of the two. The chamber roof was made of stone slabs, called capstones. Access to the chamber was through an opening in the mound's kerb or outer edge.

Brane barrow was first discovered by William Borlase in 1863 while he was exploring an underground structure, probably Carn Euny, a short distance away. Borlase refers to the structure as the barrow near Chapel Euny, because of its location near the village of Chapel Euny. The farmer who owned the site told Borlase that he did not destroy the barrow because it was provided a good shelter for sheep and pigs.

== Description ==
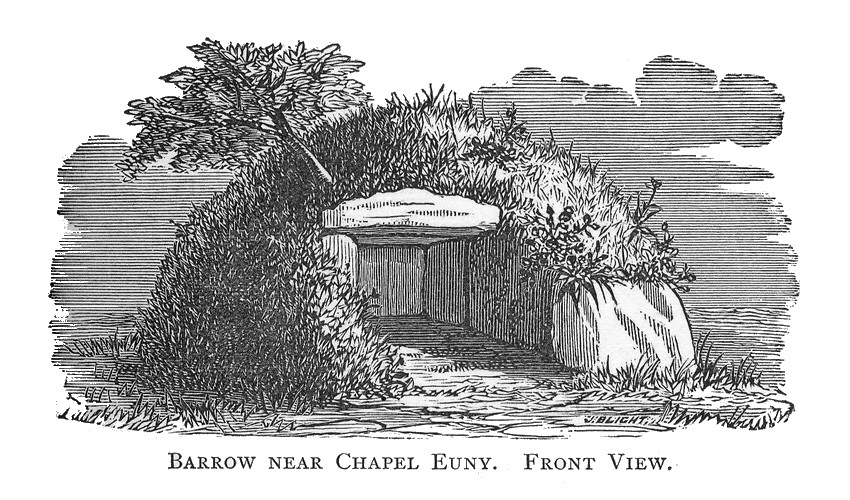
Drawing of barrow by William Borlase, 1872

Brane Barrow is a scheduled burial monument located 317 yards (290m) south west of Brane End Farm, and 1.2 miles (2 km) southwest of the village of Sancreed, in Cornwall. The monument includes an entrance grave, situated in a low-lying pasture close to the upper Lamorna River.

The barrow is a circular mound of earth and stones, measuring up to 20 feet (6.1 m) in diameter. The mound is surrounded and retained by a border of large granite blocks. It contains a rectangular stone-lined chamber measuring 7.5 ft (2.3 m) long by 4 ft (1.2 m) wide and 3 ft (90 cm) high. The chamber is roofed with two capstones: a third capstone was removed at some point. On the southeast is an entrance passage that leads directly into the chamber. It is unusual that the mound was constructed to just barely cover the chamber. The mound is damaged on the south side where the earth has been removed to expose the chamber. The burial monument can be visited with permission at Brane farm.
