= Bartinney Castle =

Iron Age enclosure in Cornwall, England

- Din Barrteni (Cornish)
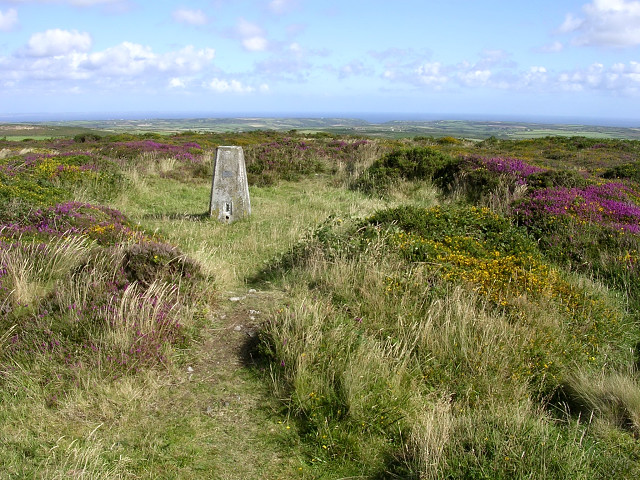
- Bartinney Castle and trig point
- Interactive map of Bartinney Castle
- 50.106474°N 5.645986°W
- Location: Penwith, Cornwall
- OS grid reference: SW3940429300

Bartinney Castle (Cornish: Din Barrteni, meaning fort of Teni's summit) is an Iron Age enclosure located in the Penwith Peninsula of Southwest Cornwall, England, it is surrounded by a circular earthwork standing on a hill surrounded by various archaeological prehistoric remains, including ancient settlements, field systems, tumuli and cairns.

One mile to the southwest is Carn Brea, the westernmost hill in Britain; and a mile to the southeast is Carn Euny Iron Age village and fogou, and the neighbouring Caer Bran hillfort and Sancreed Beacon.

On the hilltop are the remains of a circular bank, about 250 feet across, and an encircling ditch. This bank may have been much higher and there are suggestions the site could have been a sacred enclosure or Plen an Gwarry, which was a type of amphitheatre with rows of stone seats where feast days or fire festivals celebrating the Celtic solar god, Belenos, were held or where mystery plays were staged. Other theories suggest a large disc barrow or an unfinished hill fort; the outer wall is not high enough to have been of any defensive value. In the centre of the enclosure are three smaller circles arranged in a triangle, originally made of contiguous stones which have since been removed. The largest of these is forty feet in diameter; the other two are about 25 and 30 feet across.

Local parish records suggest that Bartinney Castle was the site of a Celtic fire festival marking the harvest or Samhain, the Celtic New Year's Day.

The name Bartinè signifies the lighted eminence, or the hill of fires (Cornish - Bretanow). The Druids, it is said, had their fires on the eve of November, when the people were obliged to resort and re-kindle the private fires in their houses from the consecrated fires of the Druids, the domestic fire having been first carefully extinguished.

On Midsummer's Day, in recent times, the inhabitants, of this parish were greeted with sounds resembling the discharge of musketry in different directions, proceeding from holes bored in rocks, which being charged with powder were exploded in succession; and on the same day a new flag was displayed on every mine, and the night was ushered in with noisy festivities, and bonfires blazing on many of the hills.

The name may also be derived from Tinne, the Druid name for the holly tree, the burning of which was associated with the death of the old year and the coming of the new one on Samhain or 31 October. Tinne also means a metal ingot or iron bar according to the Bríatharogam.
