= St. Erc's Hermitage =

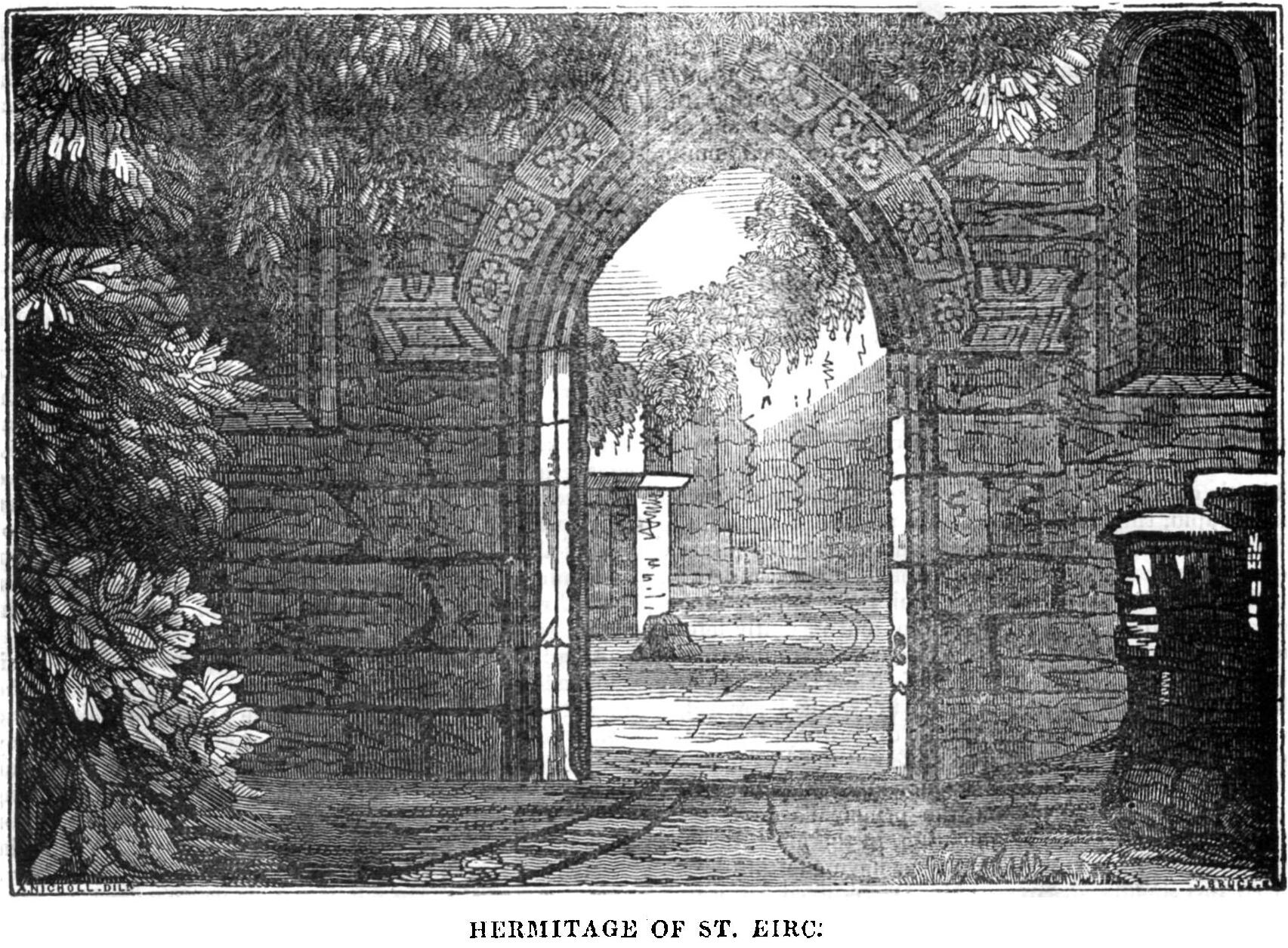
Hermitage of St. Eirc, 1834, sketched by Andrew Nicholl for the Dublin Penny Journal

St. Erc's Hermitage is a ruin in the grounds of Slane Castle, between the Church of Ireland church and the Boyne. The building consists of a nave, a chancel and a tower between them. While it is traditionally associated with Saint Erc, the visible ruins have been dated to the 15th or 16th century.
