= Diocese of Slane =

Defunct Irish diocese

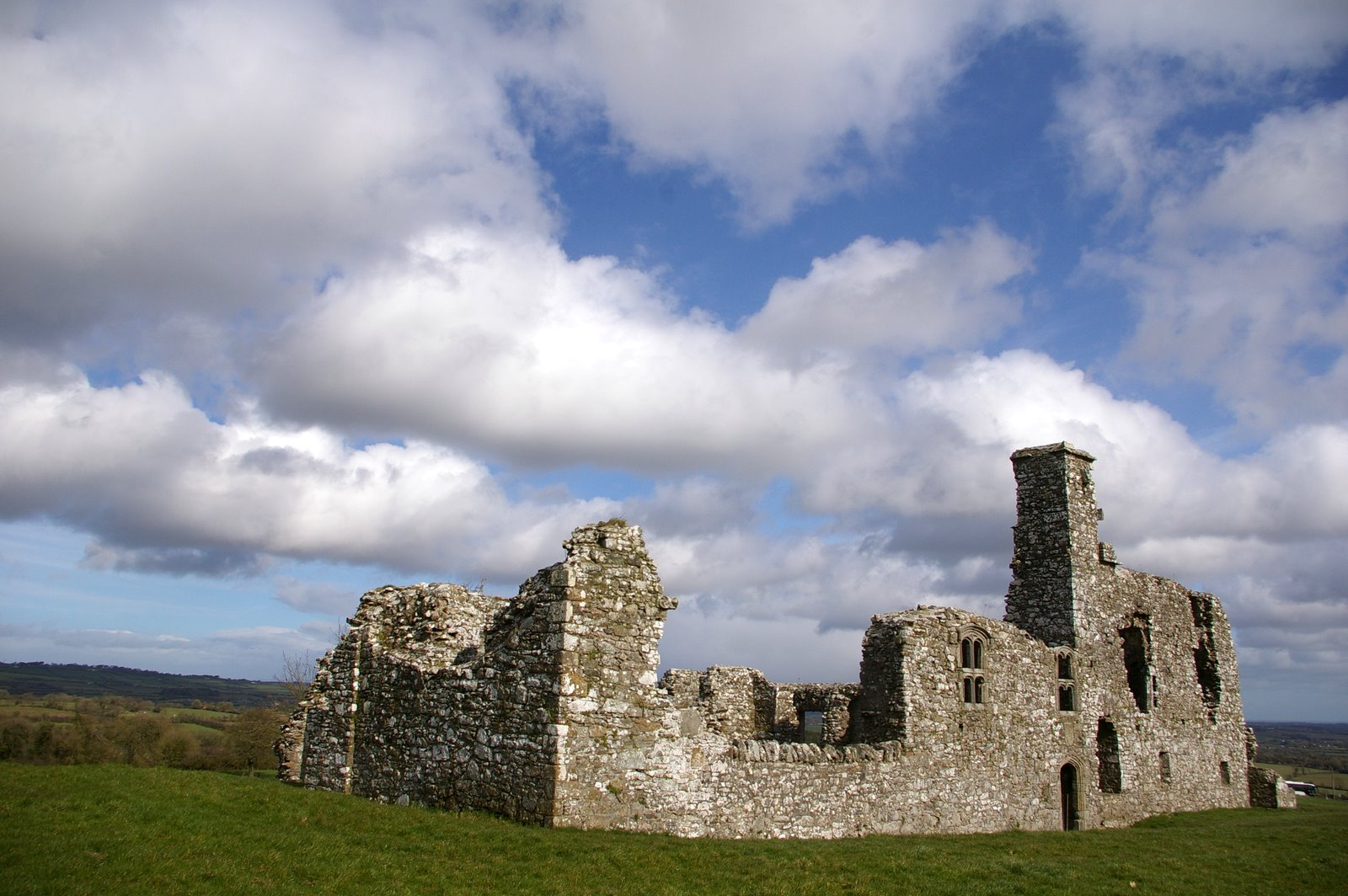
Ruins on the Hill of Slane, Ireland.

The Diocese of Slane was an Irish diocese created in 513 by St Erc with its seat at Slane. It was first subsumed by the Diocese of Meath and is now within the Diocese of Meath and Kildare.

== Bishops ==
Pre-Reformation Bishops of Slane
From	Until	Incumbent	Notes
unknown	847	Onchu	
847	854	Sodamna	Martyred by the Ostmen
854	867	Niallan	
867	874	Maol Breedi	

== Other senior clergy ==
Archdeacons of Slane
From	Until	Incumbent	Notes
unknown	1042	Eochagan	A celebrated author, Professor of Swords, he died at Cologne (Archdall)
1042	1053	Donell O'Cele	
