= Caer Bran =

Archaeological site in Cornwall, England

Coordinates: 50.104667°N 5.627000°W

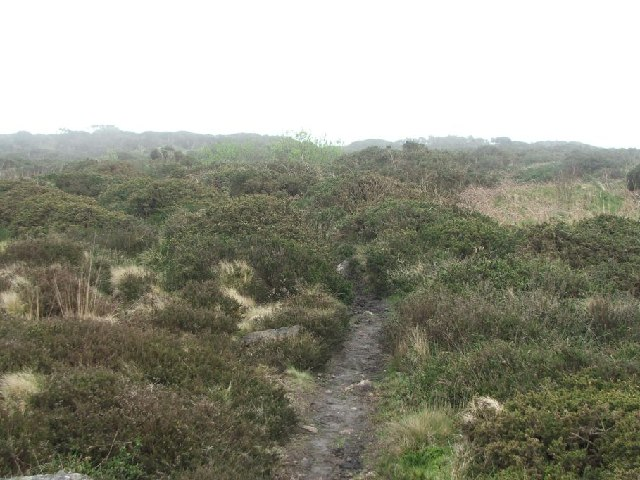
Caer Bran

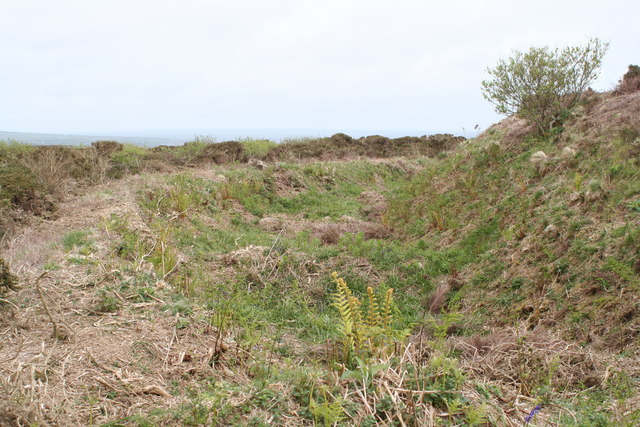
Ditch and rampart at Caer Bran hill fort

Caer Bran Hill Fort (Cornish: Ker Bosvran, meaning fort of Bran's dwelling) is an archaeological site near Sancreed and Carn Euny Iron Age village, on the Penwith peninsula in Cornwall.

== Site ==
It is a popular location for walkers and antiquarians because it commands a stunning 360 degree panorama of the southern end of the Penwith peninsula, which probably accounts for its defensive importance.

The site consists of an Iron Age hill fort which originally included a circular stone-lined inner wall, twelve feet thick, enclosing a space 200 feet in diameter. Surrounding this was a ditch forty-five feet wide and seven feet deep, an earthen rampart fifteen feet high with stone revetment and a slight counterscarp outer bank. There are remnants of a stone-lined causeway over the ditch at the original entrance to the North West adjacent to the ancient trackway linking Penzance with Land's End. In the centre are the remains of a large circular stone building, of about fifty feet in diameter.

There are three Bronze Age ring cairns within the outer ramparts according to a Cornwall Archaeological Unit Survey. Most of the original stonework was robbed for building purposes during the nineteenth century.

The fort was probably built to protect locally mined metals in particular tin, copper and silver before transportation to nearby ports in Mount's Bay or the Hayle estuary. It overlooked at least three Iron Age settlements within a half mile radius.

== Folklore ==
The name derives from Caer, the Cornish word for fortress and the name Bran means "Raven" or Crow. The association with Bran probably relates to the nearby hamlet of Brane, a contraction of Bosvran 'the house of Bran'. This may be the same Bran the Blessed from the Mabinogion in Welsh folklore, a giant and King of Britain with parallels to the Fisher King, the keeper of the Holy Grail in Arthurian legend who lived at a castle called Corbenic which is similar to Corben the old French word for Crow.

In Cornish folklore the name Bran is associated with the Mên Scryfa granite pillar which contains the inscription 'rialobrani cunovali fili' which means 'royal raven glorious prince'. An invader attacked the glorious prince and occupied a hill fort, at Penzance driving Bran back to his hill fort at Caer Bran. A battle was fought, and Bran was killed possibly on his way to Chun Castle and a stone was erected at the site which was said to correspond to the height of the dead warrior.

In local legend Caer Bran was said to be a sanctuary from evil spirits and the abode of the Pobel Vean (Cornish: Little people) or faeries.

== Landmarks ==
- Carn Euny Iron Age Village and fogou is about half a mile to the west.
- Bartinney Castle is an Iron Age Enclosure 1 mile to the west.
- Sancreed Beacon is to the North East about half a mile.
