= HMS Thais (1806) =

Sloop of the Royal Navy

- Plan of the Thais

History

United Kingdom
- Name: HMS Thais
- Ordered: 1 October 1805
- Builder: Benjamin Tanner, Dartmouth
- Laid down: October 1805
- Launched: 19 August 1806
- Out of service: June 1815
- Fate: Sold 1818

United Kingdom
- Name: Thais
- Owner: Brown & Co.
- Acquired: 1818, by purchase
- Fate: Last listed in 1826

General characteristics
- Class & type: Thais-class fireship
- Tons burthen: 4317/94 (bm)
- Length: 108 ft 9 in (33.1 m) (overall); 90 ft 9 5/8 in (27.7 m) (keel)
- Beam: 29 ft 10 1/2 in (9.1 m)
- Depth of hold: 9 ft 0 in (2.7 m)
- Propulsion: Sail
- Complement: 121
- Armament: Designed; Upper deck (D):16 × 24-pounder carronades; QD:6 × 18-pounder carronades; Fc:2 × 6-pounder Chase guns + 2 × 18-pounder carronades; Later; UD:14 × 18-pounder carronades; Fc:2 × 6-pounder guns

HMS Thais was built for the British Royal Navy in 1806 and was the name-vessel of her class of fire ships. Between 1811 and 1813 she served in the West Africa Squadron, which was attempting to suppress the slave trade. During this service she captured several slave traders and an American privateer. She made one voyage to the East Indies. Thais was sold in 1818. She then became a merchantman. She was last listed in 1826.

== Design ==
John Henslow designed the Thais class as 18-gun fireships, with a design close to that of the Tisiphone class of sloops. The Royal Navy used the class as sloops and re-rated them as such in March 1808. In early 1811 most of the class, including Thais, were re-rated as post ships.

== Naval career ==
Commander Isaac Ferrieres commissioned Thais in June 1807 as a fireship. Thais was among the naval vessels at Plymouth on 27 and 28 August 1807 and so shared in the proceeds arising from the detention of the Danish vessels Elizabeth, Tiesco, and Aurora, in the run-up to the Gunboat War with Denmark. (Note: A captain's share of the proceeds was worth £2 19s 6d; a seaman's share was worth 2 1/2d.) Ferrieres sailed Thais on 9 September for the West Indies. There she participated in the capture of the Danish West Indies during December. (Note: A prize money notice in the London Gazette in 1816 gives a list of the vessels, and the army units that participated in the campaign. The two commanders-in-chief each received £1293 3s 5 3/4d. A naval captain or commander received a first-class share, which was worth £398 10s 3 1/2d. A fifth-class share, that of a seaman, was worth £1 18s 10d.)

By February 1808 Thais was back at Plymouth and undergoing refitting as a sloop, a process that took into April. On 21 January 1809 Thais was at Cape Town. There Admiral Bertie, admiral in charge of the Cape of Good Hope Station, sent her out to look for Diana, which had been reported damaged, and for the East Indiamen Experiment, Glory, and Lord Nelson, which were overdue. It turned out that the three East Indiamen had foundered without a trace. Later in 1809 Thais served in the North Sea. In August Thais was part of a squadron under the command of Sir Home Riggs Popham in the Scheldt during the Walcheren Campaign. On 23 May 1810 she escorted a convoy to the Mediterranean.

In November 1810 Commander Edward Scobell assumed command. On 14 December Thais left Gibraltar as an escort to a convoy for Britain.

=== West Africa Squadron ===
Thais was re-rated as a sixth rate in 1811, and on 3 April Scobell received promotion to post captain. Thais and Scobell then sailed for the West Coast of Africa and service with the West Africa Squadron. (Note: Admiralty records only note her sailing on 2 May 1812, but this may either represent a typographical error for the year, or represent a second voyage as Thais captured three slave traders off the African coast in 1811.)

On 28 July 1811 Thais captured the brig Havannah. The capture took place off "Trade Town". Havannah was suspected to be a British vessel sailing under a foreign flag. She had 100 slaves aboard, of whom 98 survived to be landed at Freetown, where the Vice admiralty court condemned her. On 30 August, Thais captured the Portuguese brig Venus off Badagry. She too was condemned at Freetown, and 21 slaves were landed there. Three days later, Thais captured another Portuguese brig, Calypso, off Lagos. She landed 13 slaves at Freetown, but the court returned her to her owners.

On 24 June 1812 Thais captured the American schooner Dolphin south of Gorée. She landed 79 slaves at Freetown, where the court condemned her.

Then on 14 August Thais captured the Spanish brig Carlotta at Loango Bay. She had no slaves aboard. On 29 August, Thais captured the Portuguese brig Flor d'America, also at Loango, that was carrying 364 slaves. The court at Freetown condemned both vessels.

On 5 September Thais captured the Portuguese schooner Orizonte at Mayumba Bay. She landed 18 slaves at Freetown, where the court condemned her. (Note: A first-class share of the prize money was worth £379 15s 7d; a sixth-class share, that of an ordinary seaman, was worth £5 12s.)

On 31 March 1813 Thais captured the U.S. brig Rambler. Rambler, of 160 tons (bm), was armed with twelve 9 & 6-pounder guns, and had a crew of 88 men. She had sailed from Rhode Island on 28 January and had not made any captures. (Note: Rambler, Captain J. Appleby, had on a prior cruise chased one British vessel on shore, and had captured the 16-gun Union. The Royal Navy had recaptured Union, which was, however, subsequently wrecked.) The capture took place off Cape Mount.

Then on 28 May 1813 Thais was involved in apprehending Juan a ship sailing near the Rio Pongo, which was then taken to Sierra Leone. She was an American sloop carrying no slaves; British records indicate that the capture took place off Cape Sierra Leone. The court at Freetown condemned her.

Thais assisted the privateer Kitty after Kitty captured two slave traders, San Jose Triumfo and Phoenix, on 4 June. On 27 June Thais and the colonial armed schooner Princess Charlotte captured three small craft off Cape Mesurado.

In January 1814 Captain Henry Weir replaced Scobell, who had resigned his commission. (Note: The owners of Juan successfully contested the legality of the seizure of Juan. Scobell resigned his commission in January 1814. Even so, in 1829 there was a distribution of prize money for vessel and cargo. A first-class share was worth £239 17s 11d; a sixth-class share was worth £3 6s 9 1/2d.)

=== Subsequent service ===
In late March 1814 Thais was at Hellevoetsluis to transport French coins that Nathan Rothschild had collected. Rothschild had a contract to deliver £600,000 to the south of France by 14 March. By the time Thais and Comus were able to deliver to Bordeaux the £450,000 that Rothschild had gathered Napoleon had abdicated. From Bordeaux Thais carried General Henry Bayly and his staff to Plymouth.

Between October and December 1814 Thais was at Plymouth being cut down, losing her spar deck, and having her armament being reduced to 16 guns.

In 1815 she sailed to the East Indies, escorting East Indiamen. On 6 April Thais took Mercury, Browsse, master, into Madeira. Mercury had been sailing from Bordeaux to Martinique when Thais intercepted her. Thais then sent Mercury to England. Mercure, Brouessett, master, reached Lisbon. There she was released to resume her voyage to Martinique.

On 10 September Thais left Penang for China.

Between 6 and 11 April 1816, Weir was president of a court-martial that took place on HMS Cornwallis in Madras roads. The board found that Captain Robert O'Brien, captain of Cornwallis, had exceeded his authority in appointing himself a commodore and dismissed him from the service. (Note: In 1817 O'Brien was reinstated in the Navy. He contested the court-martial with one of his grounds being that every member of the board was junior to him. Weir then assumed command of Cornwallis.)

Weir returned to Thais. Under his command she arrived at St Helena on 28 September from India, and sailed two days later for England.

== Disposal ==
By 1817 Thais was in ordinary at Plymouth. The "Principal Officers and Commissioners of His Majesty's Navy" offered "Thais, of 22 guns and 431 tons", lying at Plymouth, for sale on 13 August 1818. She sold on that day for £1,400.

== Merchantman ==
Thais appeared in Lloyd's Register for 1819 at London with Robson, master, and Brown & Co. owners. This entry continued unchanged until 1826, which was the last time Thais was listed.
