= Kitty (1810 ship) =

History

France
- Launched: 1805
- Captured: c.1810

United Kingdom
- Name: Kitty
- Owner: 1810: "Crutchlw"; 1811:Roach & Co.
- Acquired: 1810, by purchase of a prize
- Fate: Captured and burnt 1814

General characteristics
- Type: Brig
- Tons burthen: 115, or 116 (bm)
- Complement: 18
- Armament: 1811:6 × 6-pounder guns; 1812:10 × 6-pounder guns

Kitty was a French vessel taken in prize c. 1810. She became a West Indiaman and then, following a change of ownership, a privateer. She was one of only two British privateers to target slave traders. She captured three off Sierra Leone before one of her targets captured her in 1814, killing her master, enslaving some of her crew, and setting fire to her.

== British career ==
Kitty enters Lloyd's Register in 1810.

Year	Master	Owner	Trade
1810	R. Banks	"Crutchlw"	London-Barbados
1811	R.Banks; J. Gibbs	"Crutchlw"; Roach & Co.	London-Barbados; Liverpool-Africa
1812	J.B.Gibbs; Roach	Roach & Co.	Liverpool-Africa
1813	J. Roach	Roach & Co.	Liverpool-Africa
1814	J. Roach	Roach & Co.	Liverpool-Africa

John Roach acquired Kitty in 1811. He received a letter of marque for her on 2 October 1812.

In early 1813 Kitty captured three slave ships off Sierra Leone, all of which she took into Freetown where the Vice admiralty court condemned them:

Date	Name	Nationality	Type	Slaves landed
1813	Amelia			85
4 June 1813	San Jose Triumfo	Spanish	Brig	96
4 June 1813	Phoenix	Portuguese	Brig	1

The need to put prize crews aboard San Jose Triumfo and Phoenix strained Roach's resources. Instead, at the cost of sharing the proceeds, he arranged for HMS Thais to take them into Freetown.

== Fate ==
Lloyd's List reported on 27 May 1814 that Kitty had been totally lost sometime in February off the coast of Africa while chasing a Spanish vessel. An English slave trader called Crawford was working with a Spanish schooner carrying slaves that Crawford had gathered. The schooner captured Kitty and the schooner's master murdered Roach. The Spaniards plundered Kitty before scuttling her. The schooner also enslaved the black crew on Kitty, including two freed Negroes from Sierra Leone, and sold them into slavery at Havana. HMS Spitfire rescued the surviving crew members and captured Crawford's launch and trade goods, but was unable to capture either Crawford or the Spanish schooner.
