= Walter Hobhouse =

British Archdeacon (1862–1928)

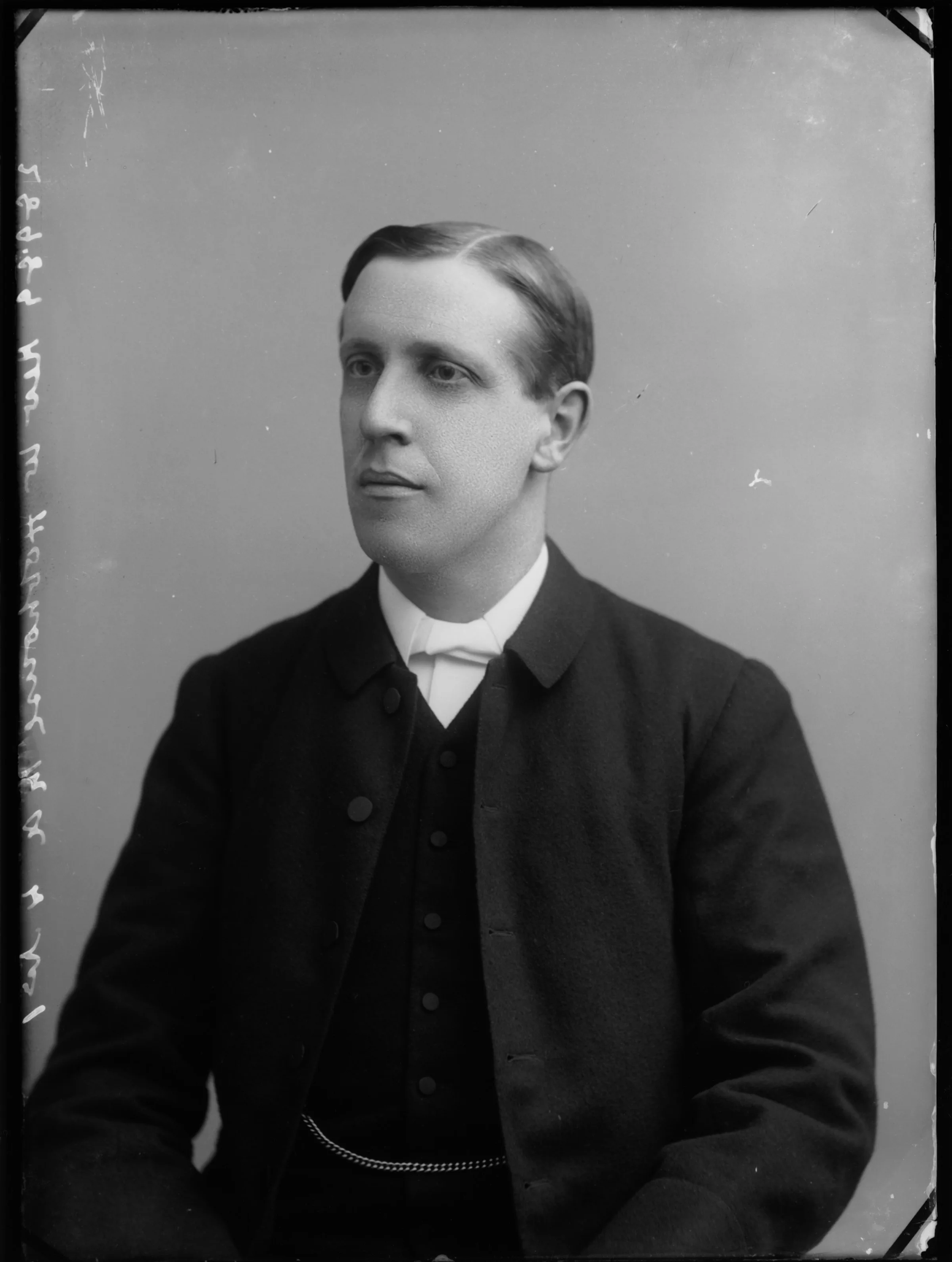
Portrait by Alexander Bassano, 1899

Walter Hobhouse (5 April 1862 – 30 October 1928) was an eminent Anglican priest and author in the late nineteenth and early twentieth centuries.

The second son of Bishop Edmund Hobhouse he was born on 5 April 1862 and educated at Eton and New College, Oxford. He was Fellow and Lecturer of Hertford College, Oxford, from 1884 to 1887; and then a Student and Tutor of Christ Church, Oxford, from 1887 to 1894. He was Headmaster of Durham School from 1894 to 1899; Editor of The Guardian from 1900 to 1905; Chancellor of St Philip's Cathedral, Birmingham, from 1905 to 1913; Archdeacon of Aston from 1912 to 1913; and Archdeacon of Gloucester from 1917 to 1919.

He died on 30 October 1928.

Church of England titles
Preceded by Edward Scobell	Archdeacon of Gloucester; 1903–1907	Succeeded by Charles Ridsdale
Preceded by Mansfield Owen	Archdeacon of Aston; 1912–1913	Succeeded by George Gardner
