= List of headmasters of Durham School =

This is a sub-article of Durham School.

Durham School, tracing its history back to Thomas Langley in 1414 and earlier, has had a number of Headmasters (but, to date, no Headmistresses).

== 1414 to 1541 ==
This incomplete list comes from The Durham School Register, 1991. The list is derived from The Account Rolls of the Receiver General which show that two chaplains, the forerunners of the Headmasters, were paid, one for the Langley Grammar School (which became Durham School) and one for the Langley Song School (which became the Chorister School). They do not make it clear which chaplain was for which school however, so two names are often given here.

- 1414 - William Browne
- 1416 to 1419 - John Claiton John Arteys (or Ortas
- 1424 to 1435 - John Arteys
- 1438 to 1439 - John Arteys Robert Sotheron
- 1453 to 1461 - Robert Sotheron Robert Grene
- 1464 to 1466 - Robert Sotheron John Spicer
- 1466 to 1467 - Robert Sotheron Nicholas Kelchith
- 1467 to 1479 - Robert Sotheron Hugh Forster
- 1479 to 1480(?) - James Eversleet William Dosse
- 1484 to 1497 - Thomas Todd William Dosse
- 1504 to 1511 - John Hochonson (or Hotchinson) William Dosse
- 1511 to 1512 - Thomas Sanderson
- 1512 to 1513 - Thomas Sanderson William Watson
- 1513 to 1519 - Thomas Sanderson Edward Watson
- 1520 to 1521 - Thomas Sanderson George Fowberry
- 1523 to 1529 - William Cokey George Fowberry
- 1529 to 1535 - William Cokey Ralph Todd
- 1537 to 1541 - William Cokey Henry Stafford

== 1541 to 1844 ==
This list comes from The Durham School Register supplemented as indicated.

After the Dissolution in 1541, Henry VIII reconstituted the school.

- ... to 1546 (or earlier) - Henry Stafford
- 1546 (or earlier) to 1558 - Robert Hartburn
- 1158 to 1568 - Thomas Reve
- 1568 to 1579 - Robert Cooke
- 1579 to 1593 - Francis Kaye
- 1593 to 1596 - James Caufield (after his resignation the school was, for some months, in the charge of the undermaster, R. Bolton)
- 1597 to 1609 - Peter Smart
- 1610 to 1613 - Thomas Ingmethorpe
- 1614 to 1628 - Nicholas Walton
- 1629 to 1632 - Thomas Miller
- 1633 to 1640 - Richard Smelt
- 1640 to 1666 - Elias Smith
- 1666/7 to 1690 - Thomas Battersby
- 1691 to 1699 - Thomas Rudd
- 1699 to 1703 - Nicholas Burton
- 1709 to 1711 - Thomas Rudd
- 1711 to 1732 - John Rymer
- 1732 to 1761 - Richard Dongworth
- 1761 to 1768 - Thomas Randall
- 1768 to 1783 - Jonathan Branfoot
- 1783 to 1812 - James Britton
- 1812 to 1833 - John Carr
- 1833 to 1839 - Matthew Buckle
- 1839 to ... - Edward Elder

== Post-1844 ==
Originally located on Palace Green outside Durham Cathedral, the school moved to its present site in 1844.

Headmasters since then have been:

- ... to 1853 - Edward Elder
- 1853 to 1882 - Henry Holden
- 1882 to 1884 - William Fearon
- 1884 to 1894 - James Marshall
- 1894 to 1899 - Walter Hobhouse
- 1899 to 1905 - Albert Hillard
- 1905 to 1907 - Harry Ward McKenzie
- 1907 to 1932 - Richard Budworth (the School sport centre is dedicated to Budworth)
- 1932 to 1958 - Henry Kenneth Luce (the School theatre is dedicated to Luce)
- 1958 to 1967 - John Brett (the School's inner quadrangle is dedicated to Brett)
- 1967 to 1972 - William Birkett Cook
- 1972 to 1982 - Michael Vallance (the school's learning support building is named Vallance Building)
- 1982 to 1997 - Michael Lang
- 1997 to 2008 - Neil Kern
- 2008 to 2009 - Derek R. Best (the building that he taught in was renamed the Derek Best Building)
- 2009 to 2014 - E. Martin George
- 2014 to 2025 - Kieran McLaughlin
- 2025 to date - Dr Michael Alderson
