= Euny =

Saint Euny or Uny (6th century) is the patron saint of the churches of Lelant and Redruth in west Cornwall, England, UK.

== Life ==
William Worcester in his account of travels in Cornwall in 1478 records that St Uny, the brother of St Herygh, was buried at the parish church of St Uny near the town of Lelant, and that his feast day was 1 February. According to him Uny and Herygh (patron of St Erth) were the brothers of St Ia, patron of St Ives (St Ia was an Irish princess who evangelised part of Cornwall). This account is the first record of the spelling "Uny", no doubt because it was recorded as spoken rather than written. The correct spelling is "Euny" though the spelling "Uny" is used after the mid 16th century; at Truro Cathedral there is a honorary canon's stall of St Euni.

As well as being the patron of Lelant and Redruth, Euny is the joint patron of Crowan. In all three churches the feast day is the Sunday nearest to 1 February, the day mentioned by William Worcester. In some 18th-century documents there is evidence that the parish of Crowan was called Uni-Crowan and this may be connected to the fact that the parish was in two parts, one in Penwith and one in Kerrier Hundred. The Kerrier portion was once a separate chapelry and may have had St Euny as its patron saint.

Lelant was the centre of Euny's missionary work and the focus of the cult after his death; it was until the Middle Ages an important port at the north end of the short land crossing to St Michael's Mount. Redruth church stands below Carn Brea where there are remains of a prehistoric town. The town must have been the capital of the district 2000 years ago. This collocation suggests that St Euny was able to convert the chieftain of this land and was given a site for the church.

== Legacy ==
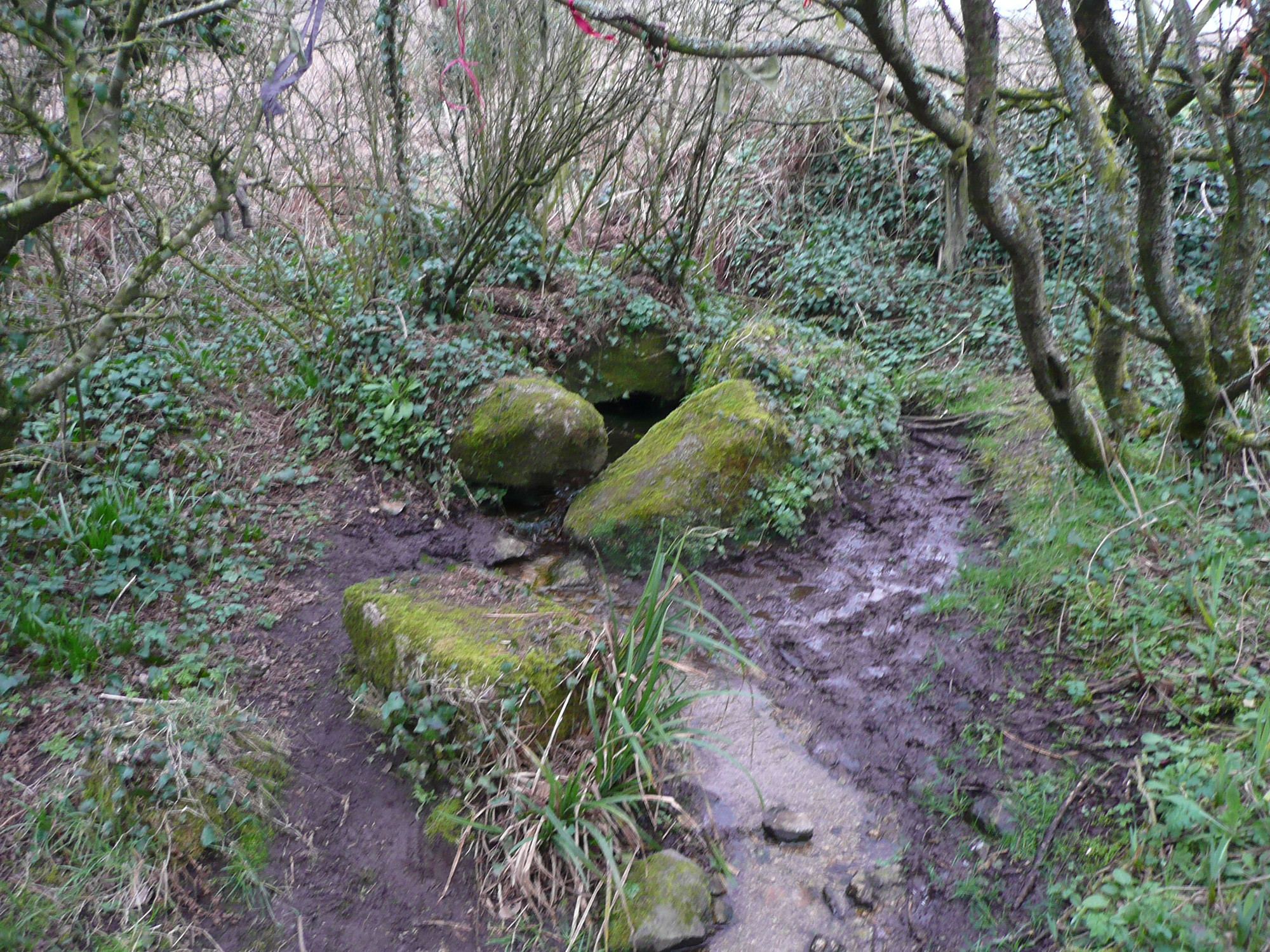
One of St Euny's wells, St Buryan

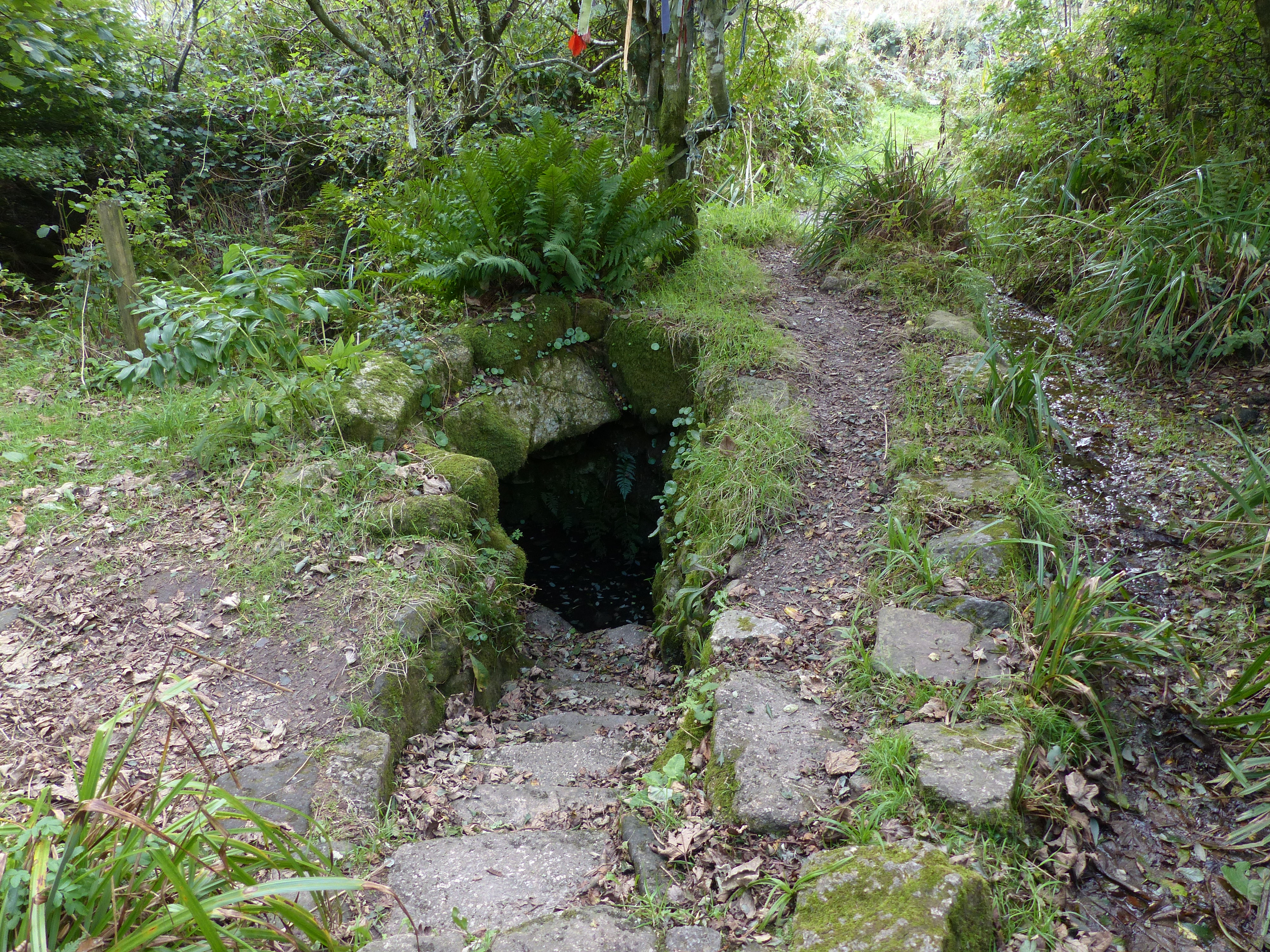
The holy well of St Euny, Sancreed

In the parish of Wendron is a farm called Marooney. (It was recorded as Mertharuny in 1751 and Metheruny in 1756.) In a circular garden still known as "the churchyard" in which human bones have been dug up are the remains of a small chapel. Nearby is "a magnificent Celtic cross of an enriched and most original design". This chapel is on the site of a very ancient church in honour of St Euny. After the Reformation it was allowed to decay. In Brittany are two parishes, Plevin and Plouyé; their names have been interpreted by Joseph Loth as containing the names of St Euny and St Ia.

There are several holy wells dedicated to St Euny in West Cornwall, including the famous holy well called Chapel Euny in the parish of Sancreed.

== See also ==
- Carn Euny
