= Eochagan =

Archdeacon of Slane until the mid 11th century

Eochagan (d 1042) was Archdeacon of Slane until his death in the mid 11th century.

He was a celebrated author, Professor of Swords and a chronographer. He died at Cologne in Germany.
