= Edward Scobell (Royal Navy officer) =

British Royal Navy officer (1783–1825)

Captain Edward Scobell
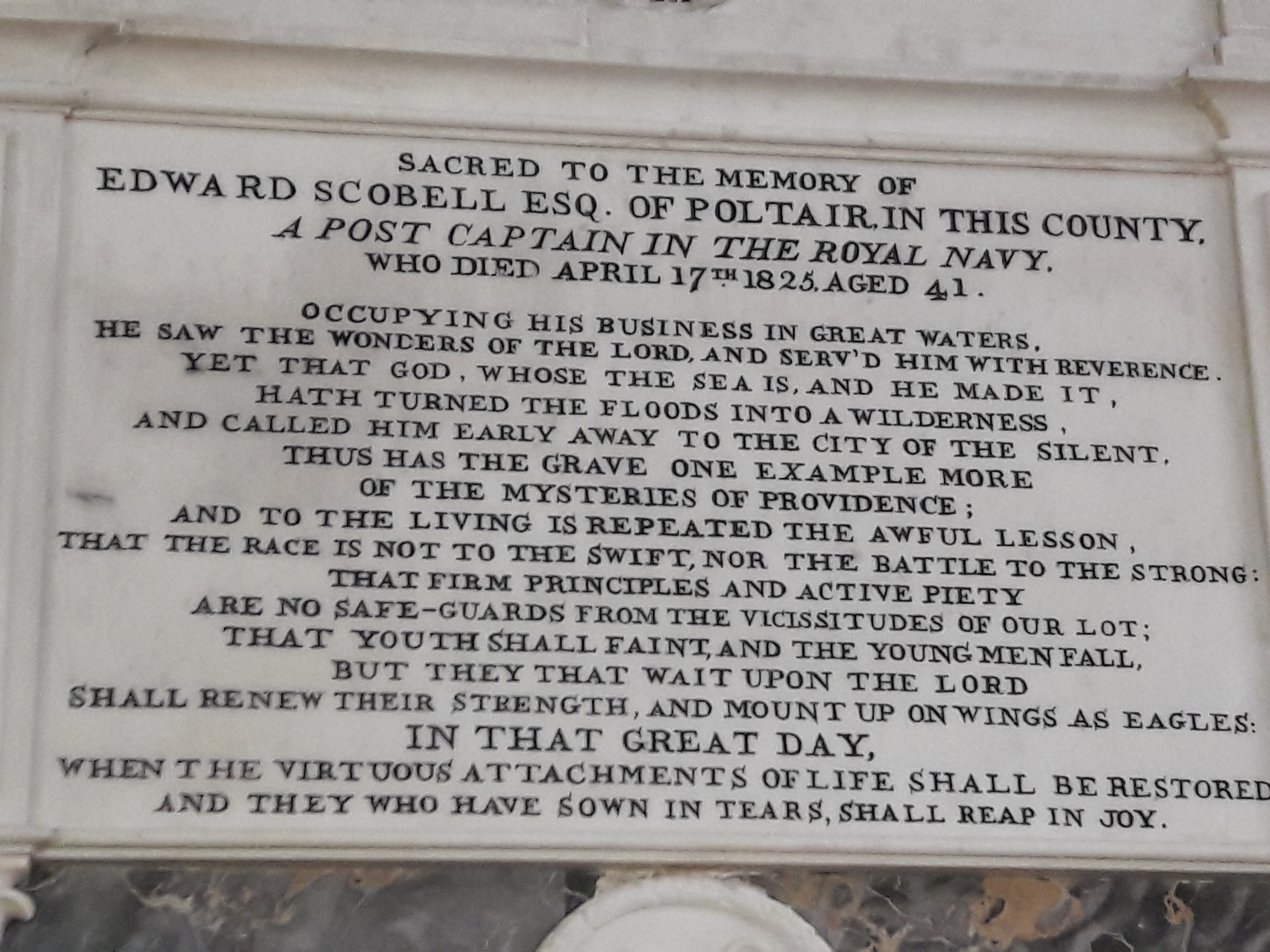
- Memorial in St Sancredus Church, Sancreed. Cornwall
- Born: baptized 12 September 1783; Sancreed
- Died: 17 April 1825 (aged 41); Poltair, Madron
- Burial place: St Sancredus Church, Sancreed
- Military career
- Allegiance: United Kingdom
- Branch: Royal Navy
- Rank: Captain
- Commands: HMS Vimiera; HMS Thais
- Conflicts: Napoleonic Wars; Caribbean campaign

Captain Edward Scobell (c.12 September 1783 – 17 April 1825) was a British Royal Navy officer who served with the West Africa Squadron.

== Family ==
Edward Scobell was baptized privately on 12 September 1783, and later on 30 December publicly baptized at Sancreed, Cornwall, to Elizabeth Stark (died 1808) and the Reverend George Pender Scobell (1748–1811). His father was vicar of St Sancredus Church, Sancreed and his mother came from Tiverton, Devon, inheriting land from her parents. Edward was the third child of seven; four boys and three girls.

Scobell purchased land at Poltair, from Richard HItchens, partly with a loan from his father.

He married Rebecca Anne Collins (c.1787–1840) on 19 April 1816 at Alverstoke, Hampshire. She was the only child of Richard Collins of Brockhurst Lodge, Hampshire; they had three children,

- Anne Margaretha (1817–1892)
- Edward Calvert (born 1818)
- Henry Sales (born 1824)

== Naval career ==
Scobell became a lieutenant in 1801 and a commander on 29 September 1808. He took command of HMS Vimiera and took part in the British capture of St Martin, St Eustatius and Saba in February 1810. He received his Commission and took command of HMS Thais as part of the West Africa Squadron.

== Death ==
Edward Scobell died on 17 April 1825 at Poltair, near Penzance, after repeated attacks of apoplexy.
