= Branne =

Branne is the name or part of the name of several communes in France:

- Branne, Doubs, in the Doubs department
- Branne, Gironde, in the Gironde department
- Saint-Aubin-de-Branne, in the Gironde department

== Other ==
- Branne (grape), another name for the French wine grape Gouais blanc
