= Sancreed Parish Church =

Church in Cornwall, England

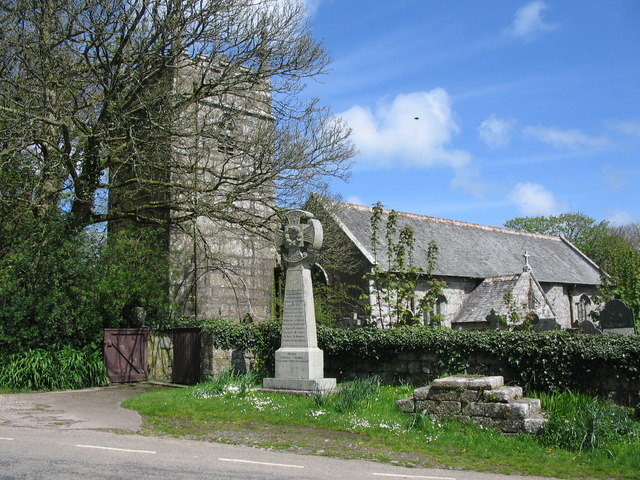
- Sancreed Parish Church
- Sancreed Parish Church
- 50.10808°N 5.60945°W
- OS grid reference: SW371174
- Denomination: Church of England

Administration
- Province: Canterbury
- Diocese: Truro
- Archdeaconry: Cornwall
- Deanery: Penwith

Sancreed Parish Church (Grade II Listed) is the parish church of Sancreed, Cornwall, England, UK. It is an Anglican church in the Diocese of Truro.

Sancreed Parish Church only uses the traditional Book of Common Prayer for all services, whereas churches now generally use the more modern Common Worship order of service. Sancreed is steeped in tradition in preserving the order of service, as held in the church for hundreds of years. There is a service every Sunday at 9.30am. Sancreed Parish Church is a corporate member of the Prayer Book Society (England).

Sancreed Parish church lies at the heart of the village and is dedicated to St Sancredus. The church is built of granite, parts of which date back to the 13th and 14th centuries; the church was originally built in a cruciform shape. The current church has an unbuttressed west tower of two stages, a north transept and a 15th-century south aisle of five bays. Features of interest include the fine font, which is of the St Ives type dating from the 14th century, decorated with carved angels holding heraldic shields, and the wooden 15th century rood screen, which has curious carvings at the base to which traces of the original paint still clings in places.

Much of the church was restored in 1881 by the architect J D Sedding and the contractor, Mr Bone of Liskeard. A report in The Cornishman newspaper stated,

There was nothing striking about the old Church except its hoary and depressing appearance. It contained a few pieces of good carved work, which doubtless will be utilized in the restoration, but very few other specimens of art.

The churchyard and church have, within the late 19th and first part of the 20th-century, made a strong appeal to painters of the Newlyn School of Art, some of whom worshipped regularly at the church and are buried in the churchyard (including Stanhope Forbes RA).

Sancreed Churchyard is also known for its five ‘Celtic’ crosses, which are medieval granite wayside crosses. The two tall crosses would have been made as churchyard crosses, while the other three were originally wayside crosses from the 12th or 13th century, later brought to the churchyard from other parts of Sancreed Parish. The five crosses are: a 10th century churchyard cross, a 13th century churchyard cross (set on a possible 7th century base), The cross from Trannack, The Sellan Cross, and The Anjarden Cross. The 13th century churchyard cross, a large cross stands immediately beside the path that angles from the porch to the southeast gate to the churchyard, strikes cross about 9 feet high, though some of that length is buried in the ground. The shaft and head are carved on all sides, and the quality of the carving is outstanding; it is reckoned to be one of the finest incised Celtic crosses in Cornwall.

Work on replacing the church roof began in 2017 following a grant from the Heritage Lottery Fund of £227,100 and more than £11,000 from charities.
