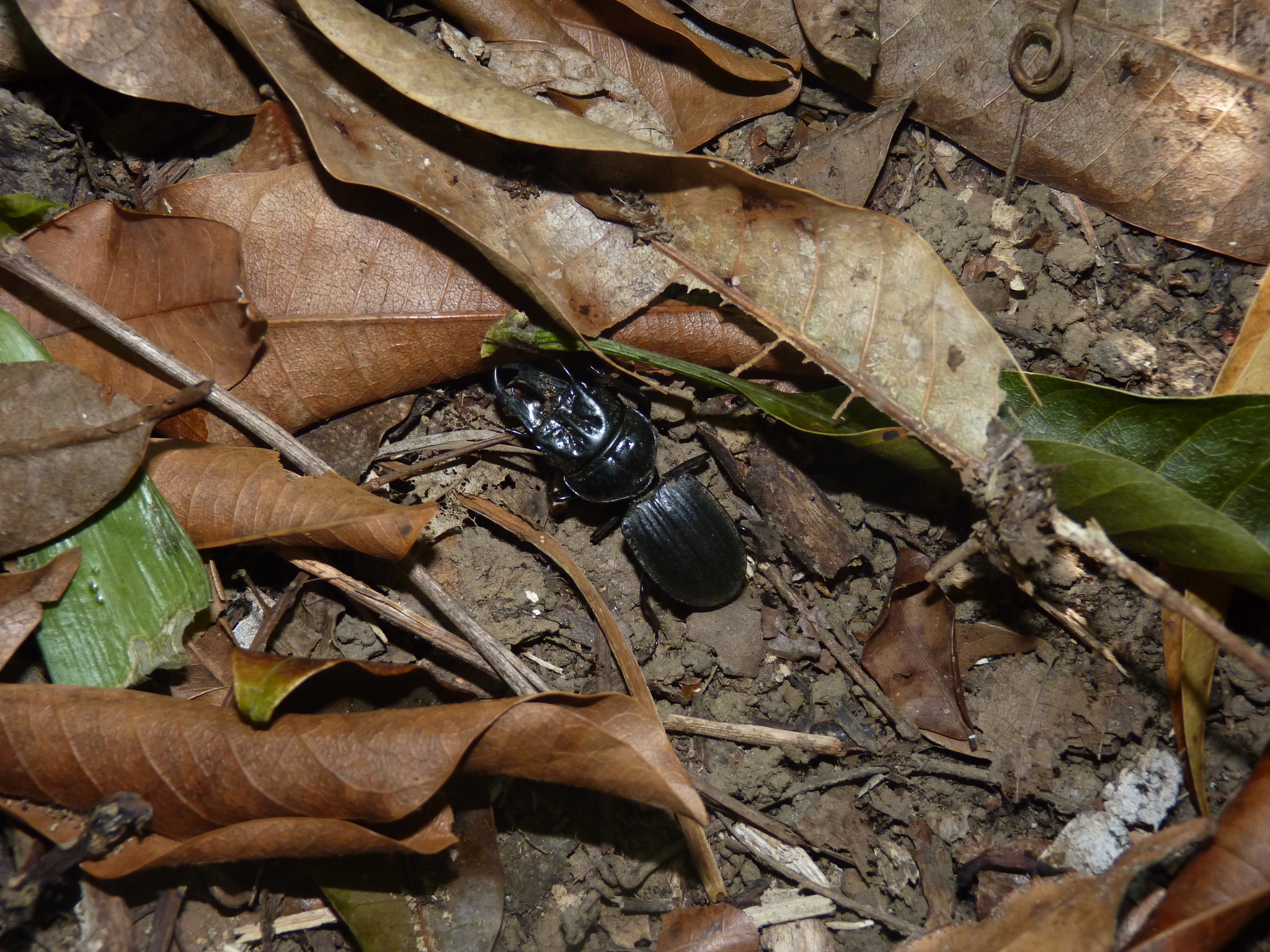
- Pilades, Madagascar

Scientific classification
- Kingdom: Animalia
- Phylum: Arthropoda
- Clade: Pancrustacea
- Class: Insecta
- Order: Coleoptera
- Suborder: Adephaga
- Family: Carabidae
- Subfamily: Scaritinae
- Tribe: Scaritini
- Subtribe: Scaritina
- Genus: Pilades; Heyne, 1895

Synonyms
- Selenoscaris Jeannel, 1946

= Pilades =

Genus of beetles

Pilades is a genus in the ground beetle family Carabidae. There are at least four described species in Pilades, found in Madagascar.

== Species ==
These four species belong to the genus Pilades:

- Pilades coquerelii (Fairmaire, 1868)
- Pilades ferus (Tschitscherine, 1894)
- Pilades sakalava (Alluaud, 1902)
- Pilades seyriganus Lorenz, 1998
