= BRANE =

Airborne computer built by IBM in the 1950s for the B-52 strategic bomber

BRANE (Bombing Radar Navigation Equipment) was an airborne computer designed and built by IBM in the 1950s during the Cold War. BRANE was developed under contract to the United States Air Force for the Boeing B-52 Stratofortress nuclear bomber. At a time when computers were the size of large rooms, in order to build a computer that could function on an aircraft, engineers at IBM solved the problems of size, weight, power, reliability and maintenance by using a modular design; with parts that could be located where space was available and components replaced in-flight when they failed. IBM built a facility in Owego, New York to boost production capacity.
