= HMS Vimiera (1808) =

French (1805–1808) and UK (1808–1814) naval brig

History

France
- Name: Pylade
- Namesake: Pylades
- Builder: Le Havre
- Laid down: August 1804
- Launched: 17 April 1805
- Captured: 20 October 1808

United Kingdom
- Name: HMS Vimiera
- Namesake: Battle of Vimeiro
- Acquired: 1808 by purchase of a prize
- Honours and awards: Naval General Service Medal with clasp "Guadaloupe"
- Fate: Sold January 1814

General characteristics
- Tons burthen: 30440/94 (bm)
- Length: Overall: 91 ft 0 in (27.7 m), or 83 ft 6 in (25.5 m); Keel: 73 ft 0 in (22.3 m), or 75 ft 0 in (22.9 m)
- Beam: 28 ft 0 in (8.5 m), or 26 ft 0 in (7.9 m)
- Depth of hold: 6 ft 10 in (2.1 m), or 13 ft 0 in (4.0 m)
- Sail plan: Brig
- Complement: At capture: 109; RN:100
- Armament: Originally: 16 × 6-pounder guns; 1806: 12 × 6-pounder guns + 4 × 32-pounder carronades; At capture: 14 × 24-pounder carronades + 2 × 9-pounder guns; RN: 14 × 24-pounder carronades + 2 × 6-pounder guns

HMS Vimiera was launched in 1805 at Havre as the French Navy brig Pylade (or Pilade). The Royal Navy captured her in 1808 and commissioned her. She participated in one campaign that earned her crew a clasp to the Naval General Service Medal. She was laid up in 1810 and sold in 1814.

== French Navy ==
Pylade was launched in 1805 to a one-off design by Jean-François Chaumont.

Pylade was commissioned at Havre to serve at Rochefort. Between 19 March 1806 and 31 May she was at Cherbourg, then cruising in the western part of the Channel, and arrived at Rochefort.

Pylade carried troops from Rochefort to Martinique, and then sailed to Guadeloupe.

The sloop HMS Goree was lying at anchor off Marie-Galante on 22 April 1808, when two brigs were spotted sailing northwards. Commander Joseph Spear determined that they were enemies after they made no response to his private signal, and set off in pursuit. The two brigs, mounting 16 guns each and so constituting the superior force, hauled up and fired on Goree, badly damaging her sails and rigging, and disabling her. They fled, however, when the 14-gun HMS Superieure arrived on the scene. Goree had one man killed and four wounded in the brief engagement, while the two brigs had combined losses of eight killed and twenty-one wounded.Superieure and Pilade maintained a running fight until the French brigs reached the protection of shore batteries at the Saintes. The brigs were later discovered to be the French Pylade and Palinure.

After this Pylade cruised off the coast of the United States and in the Caribbean.

== Capture ==
The 74-gun ship of the line HMS Pompee was on her way to Barbados on 20 October 1808 when she encountered Pylade. After a chase of 18 hours, Pompee was able to catch Pylade, which struck. Pilade was under the command of lieutenant de vaisseau Cocherel. She was eight days out of Martinique but had not made any captures. Captain George Cockburn of Pompee described Pylade as "only Three Years old, in perfect good State, and in every Respect fit for His Majesty's Service." Her officers had also told him that she was "the fastest sailing Vessel the French had in these Seas."

== Royal Navy ==
The Navy renamed Pilade Vimiera in honour of General Arthur Wellesley's victory at Vimeiro on 21 August 1808. Commander Edward Scobell, was promoted to Commander on 29 September 1808. He commissioned Vimiera in October.

In early 1810 Vimiera was one of the many vessels that participated in the invasion of Guadeloupe. During the campaign she was present on 22 February at the surrender of the Dutch colonies of Sint Maarten, Sint Eustatius and Saba. Four decades after the operation, the Admiralty issued the clasp "Guadaloupe" to the Naval General Service Medal, awarded upon application to all British participants still living in 1847.

Vimiera arrived at Portsmouth on 20 August 1810 and was laid up. Commander Scobell was promoted to post captain on 3 April 1811.

== Fate ==
The "Principal Officers and Commissioners of His Majesty's Navy" first offered the "Vimiera sloop, of 304 tons", lying at Portsmouth, for sale on 9 June 1814. She finally sold for £460 on 1 September.
