= Brane, Cornwall =

Hamlet in Cornwall, England

Coordinates: 50.0985°N 5.6322°W

Brane: Cornish: Bosvran
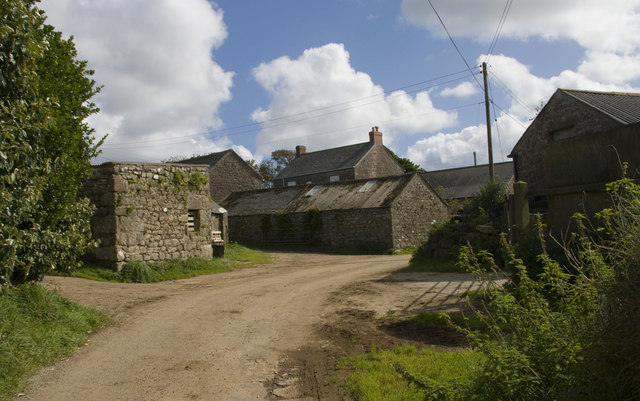
- Farm buildings at Brane

- Location within Cornwall
- OS grid reference: SW403284
- Civil parish: Sancreed
- Unitary authority: Cornwall
- Ceremonial county: Cornwall
- Region: South West
- Country: England
- Sovereign state: United Kingdom
- Post town: Penzance
- Postcode district: TR20 8
- Police: Devon and Cornwall
- Fire: Cornwall
- Ambulance: South Western

Brane (Cornish: Bosvran, meaning Crow Ford) is a hamlet southwest of Sancreed in west Cornwall, England, UK. It is in the civil parish of Sancreed. It is noted for the Carn Euny Iron Age site which lies to the north. Other prehistoric sites nearby include the Iron-Age hill fort of Caer Bran, and chambered tomb known as Brane Barrow.

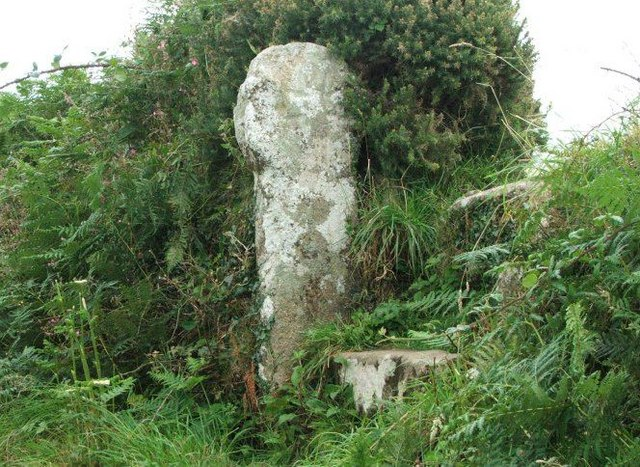
Brane Cross
