= Erc of Slane =

Irish saint (died 514)

- Died: 513
- Venerated in: Roman Catholic Church; Eastern Orthodox Church
- Feast: Ireland: 2 November; Cornwall: 31 October; Orthodox Church Calendar: 2 November

Erc mac Dega (Latin: Ercus; Cornish: Erth), also known (incorrectly) as Herygh, was an Irish saint. He was active in Cornwall. Tradition ascribes the foundation of the original monastery on the Hill of Slane to him.

== Early life ==
Erc, son of Dago, is believed to have been a pagan druid and the only member of King Laoghaire's retinue to pay homage to Saint Patrick during the latter's confrontation with the druids at the Hill of Slane in 433. Dubhthach maccu Lugar was also a druid who paid tribute to St. Patrick and converted. Erc mac Dega was converted to Christianity by St. Patrick and appointed the first Bishop of Slane. St. Erc's foundation at Slane stayed active for at least six hundred years.

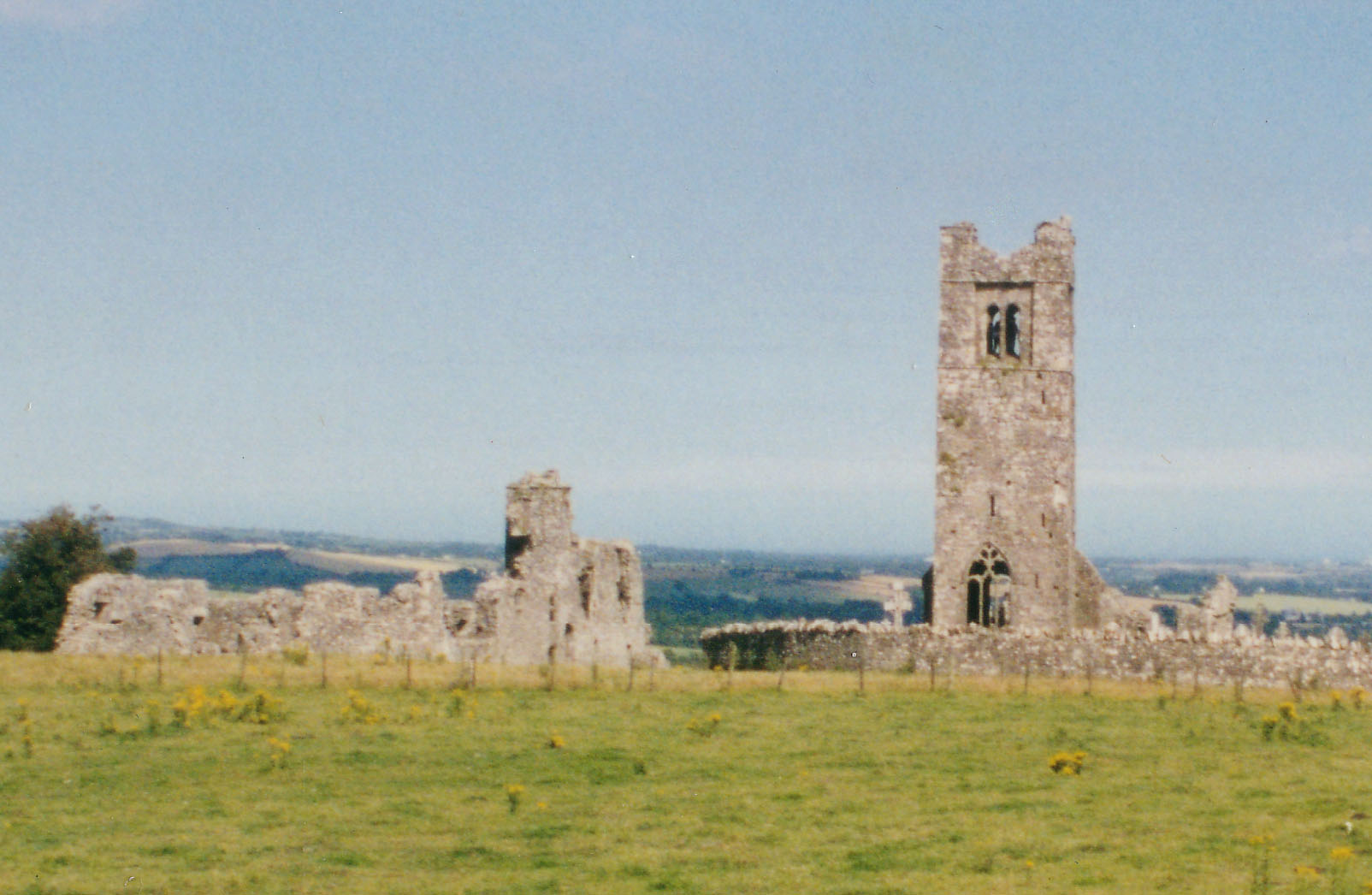
Hill of Slane

Erc may have arrived in Kerry soon after the mission of St. Benignus, who was sent by St. Patrick to preach to the tribes of West Munster in 450. Benignus's visit was comparatively short since he was called away to North Clare and Connaught. St. Patrick sent Erc to complete the conversion of Kerry. Erc had spiritual charge over Kerry and a wide range of southwest Limerick (in the heart of which lay the convent of Ita at Killeedy).

Before Saint Patrick died in 461, he sent Bishop Erc south to Munster.

Around the year 484, Brigit of Kildare was his travelling companion to his native province.

Erc was the friend and tutor of St. Brendan the Navigator, the patron of Kerry. Erc is said to have trained the young Brendan at his church in Ardfert in 512. Erc established the school at Slane where King Dagobert II is said to have received his early education.

In the nineteenth century, historian Dean Cogan (a native of Slane) called Erc a man of great sanctity and usefulness. St. Patrick is reputed to have said: "Bishop Erc – Everything he judged was just; Everyone that passes a just judgement – Shall receive the blessing of Bishop Erc".

In the 16th century, the hilltop monastery became a Franciscan friary supported by the Flemings. In the grounds of Slane Castle are the ruins of St. Erc's Hermitage. This consists of a late fifteenth or early sixteenth century chapel and an earlier dwelling. The 12th century martyrology of Gorman called him: "Erc of Slane, bishop of Lilcach and from Ferta Fer Feic beside Sid Truim from the West" (Ferta Fear Fiac means "the Graves of the Men of Fiac").

The Cornish Saint Erc is generally believed to be the same man. He was the brother of Saints Uny and Ia. He crossed from Ireland to Cornwall, where a church and the village of St Erth were dedicated to him. His feast in Cornwall is held on 31 October and his feast in Ireland is held on 2 November.

Little is recorded of him apart from what William of Worcester wrote in 1478: "Saint Herygh, the brother of Saint Uny, a bishop, lies in a certain church situated under the cross of the church of Saint Paul in London; his day is kept on the vigil of All Saints, that is, the last day of October ... Saint Hya ... the sister of Saint Herygh ..." (quoted in Doble, G. H. (1960)). The statement about St. Paul's may be due to a mistaken identification with St Erconwald.

A chapel of St Ercus was built at Trevessa in the parish of St Erth in 1403.

Erc finally returned to Slane and lived out the rest of his life in prayer and solitude at a quiet hermitage beside the Boyne. Erc died on 2 November 514, at age 93.
