= Edward Scobell (priest) =

Anglican priest

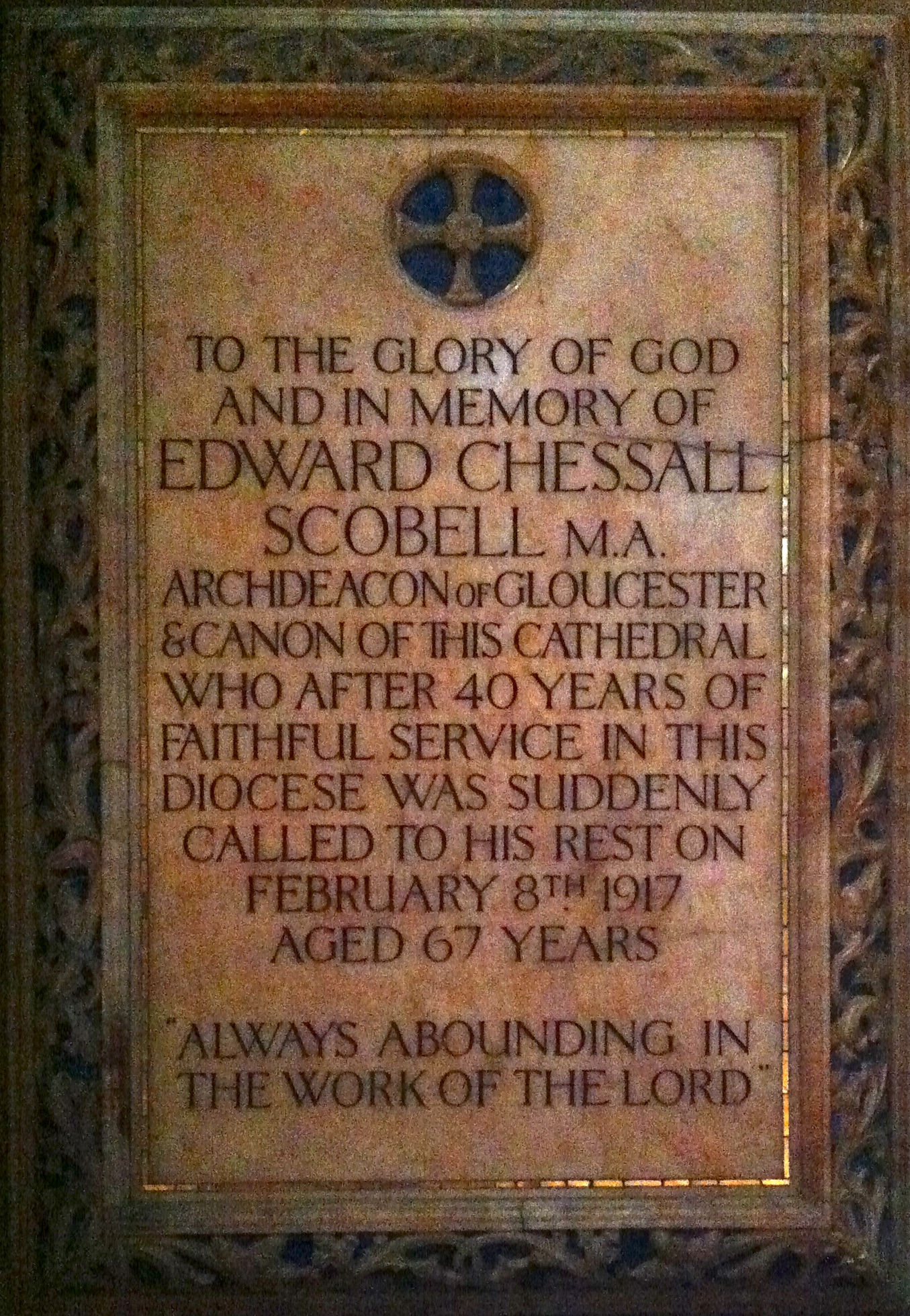
Memorial to Edward Scobell in Gloucester Cathedral

Edward Chessall Scobell (27 January 1850 – 8 February 1917) was an Anglican priest who served as Archdeacon of Gloucester from 1903 until his death.

He was born into an ecclesiastical family, son of Sanford George Scobell, vicar of Market Rasen. Educated at Marlborough College, he attended Pembroke College, Oxford and was ordained in 1874. After curacies in Horsham and Gloucester he was a Lecturer at Gloucester Theological College from 1877 to 1881. After this he was Vicar of St Luke's, Gloucester (1881–89); Examining Chaplain to the Bishops of Gloucester (1883–1917); Rector of Upton St Leonards (1889–1912); Rural Dean of Gloucester (1890–1903); and Residentiary Canon of Gloucester Cathedral (1912–1917).

Church of England titles
Preceded by John Bowers	Archdeacon of Gloucester; 1903–1907	Succeeded by Walter Hobhouse
