= Carn Euny =

Archaeological site in Cornwall, England

- Hendra Chapeluni (Cornish)
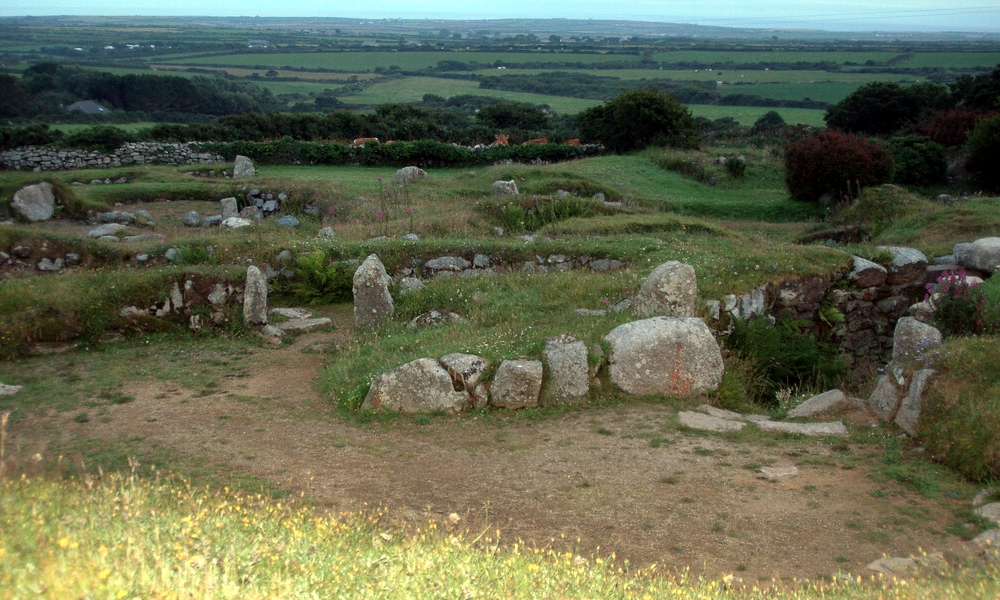
- Carn Euny ancient village

- Location within Southwest Cornwall
- 50.10234°N 5.63448°W
- Type: Ancient village
- Periods: Iron Age/Roman
- Cultures: Romano-British
- Location: Brane, Cornwall grid reference SW402288

History
- Built: c. 200 BC
- Abandoned: c. 400 AD

Site notes
- Condition: Ruins
- Owner: Cornwall Heritage Trust
- Public access: Yes

Carn Euny (Cornish: Hendra Chapeluni) is an archaeological site near Sancreed, on the Penwith peninsula in Cornwall, United Kingdom. It consists of evidence of both Iron Age and post-Iron Age settlement, with excavation on the site showing activity at Carn Euny as early as the Neolithic period. The first timber huts there were built about 500 BC, and 400–500 years later were replaced by stone huts, the remains of which are still visible.

Carn Euny is best known for the well-preserved state of the large fogou, an underground passageway, which is more than 65 feet (20 metres) long. This fogou runs just below the surface of the ground and is roofed with massive stone slabs.

The site was abandoned late in the Roman period.

== Location ==
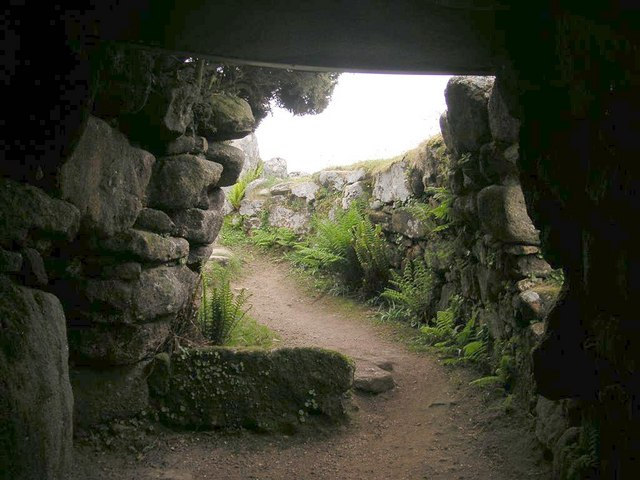
View from the Fogou

Carn Euny lies in southwest Cornwall in the Penwith District, near the village of Sancreed. The archaeological site can be accessed at any time and the admission is free. Parking can be found in the nearby hamlet of Brane. The site is overlooked by the Iron Age hill fort of Caer Bran. Another similar Romano-British settlement is Chysauster about 10 km to the northeast. Carn Euny is managed by the Cornwall Heritage Trust.

== Construction ==
Traces of human activity in Carn Euny have been detected from the early Neolithic period. Iron Age round houses of wattle and daub, mud and wood were built around 500-400 BC, and replaced by stone houses starting in the 1st century BC. Some of these stone houses were "replaced with larger, stone ‘courtyard’ houses" between 200-400 AD, the remains of which are the ruins still visible above ground as the older roundhouses are only left as sub-surface ruins. Seven single-room stone houses, of both a round and oval form, and three courtyard houses are in evidence; courtyard houses only being found in Cornwall.

The most important structure of the site is the fogou (Ogo being Cornish for cave), a man-made underground passage which is covered with massive stone slabs. Fogous can be found in other places in the UK and Ireland, and are known more generally as souterrains. Their purpose is unclear. The fogou at Carn Euny is in particularly good condition and consists of a 20 m-long (66 ft) corridor, with a side passage that leads to a round stone chamber with a collapsed roof, and a small tunnel which may be a second entrance.

At this time the people of Carn Euny lived from agriculture, livestock, trade, and perhaps tin mining. Evidence of farming here includes 40 acres enclosed within a field boundary, which is most likely the area farmed by this settlement. The inhabitants likely grew oats, barley and rye, and kept sheep, goats and cattle. The courtyard houses "may have been used for stabling livestock, crop processing and outdoor cooking."

== Excavations ==
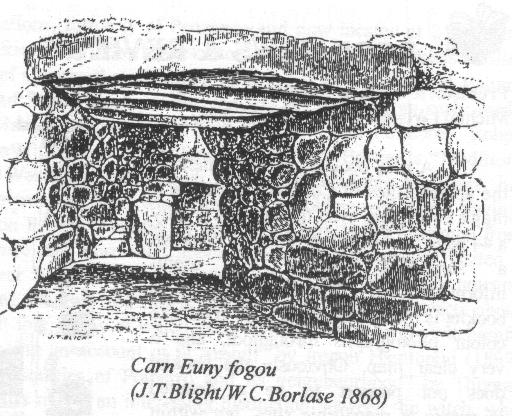
Drawing by John Thomas Blight, 1868

The site was discovered in the early 19th Century by prospectors searching for tin deposits. Between 1863 and 1868, the antiquarian William Copeland Borlase examined the archaeological site and exposed the fogou. The graphic artist John Thomas Blight made corresponding engravings for the excavation report. During the 1920s, Dr. Favell and Canon Taylor discovered the foundation walls of the houses with courtyards. Between 1964 and 1972, extensive excavations were carried out, in which nine hut foundations were discovered. The fogou and the circular chamber were investigated and restored. Four main occupation phases between the 5th century BC and the 4th century AD were found.

== Chapel Euny Well ==
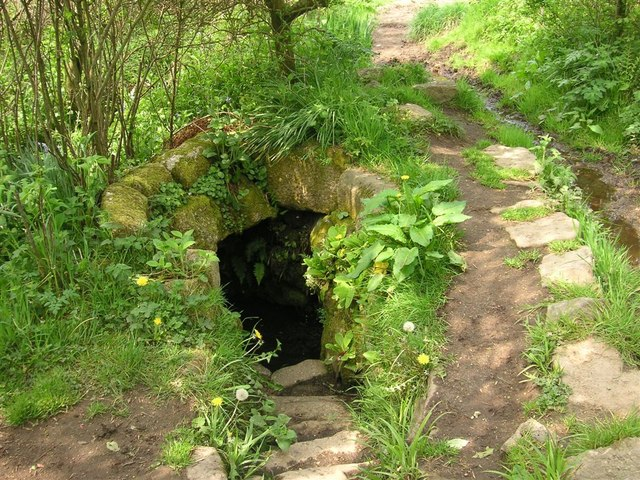
Chapel Euny well

West of the settlement are a pair of ancient wells. One is mentioned in The Legendary Lore of the Holy Wells of England of 1893 where William Borlase states (writing in the 1750s):

"I happened luckily to be at this well upon the last day of the year, on which, according to vulgar opinion, it exerts its principal and most salutary powers. Two women were here, who came from a neighbouring parish, and were busily employed in bathing a child. They both assured me that people who had a mind to receive any benefit from St. Euny's Well must come and wash upon the three first Wednesdays in May. Children suffering from mesenteric disease should be dipped three times in Chapel Uny widderschynnes, and widderschynnes dragged three times round the well."

It is also referred to as St. Eurinus' or Uny's Well (i.e. well of St Euny) and may be confused with Saint Euny's Well at Carn Brea.

== See also ==
- Chysauster
- Petrosomatoglyph Symbolism
- Ringfort
