= Sancreed =

Village in Cornwall, England

Coordinates: 50.109°N 5.610°W

Sancreed: Cornish: Eglossankres
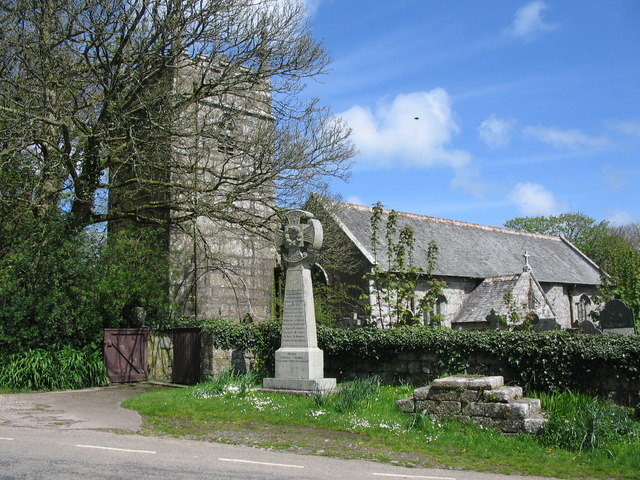
- Sancreed parish church

- Location within Cornwall
- Population: 649 (2011 census including Brane and Catchall)
- OS grid reference: SW418293
- Civil parish: Sancreed
- Unitary authority: Cornwall
- Ceremonial county: Cornwall
- Region: South West
- Country: England
- Sovereign state: United Kingdom
- Post town: Penzance
- Postcode district: TR19, TR20
- Dialling code: 01736
- Police: Devon and Cornwall
- Fire: Cornwall
- Ambulance: South Western
- UK Parliament: St Ives

Sancreed (Cornish: Eglossankres) is a village and civil parish in Cornwall, England, United Kingdom, approximately three miles (5 km) west of Penzance.

Sancreed civil parish encompasses the settlements of Bejouans, Bosvennen, Botreah, Drift, Sancreed Churchtown, Trenuggo, and Tregonnebris. It is bounded by St Just parish to the west, Madron parish to the northeast, and St Buryan and Paul parishes to the south. The parish comprises 4,608 acres (18.65 km^{2}) of land including Drift Reservoir, which provides drinking water for the area.

== Geography ==
Sancreed is an inland parish in the former Hundred of Penwith, about three miles from Penzance. The civil parish encompasses the settlements of Bejouans, Bosvennen, Botreath, Drift, Sancreed Churchtown, Trenuggo and Tregonnebris. It is bounded by St Just to the west, Madron parish to the north-east and St Buryan and Paul parishes to the south. Within the parish is a noteworthy prehistoric settlement at Carn Euny. A few hundred metres west of the church there is a holy well and baptistry, which predate the parish church. The parish comprises 4,608 acres of land wholly situated on granite and has, with a light loam, covering used chiefly for mixed agriculture, a population of 628 (2001), many of whom look outside of the parish for employment and the provision of commercial, recreational and social services.

This is a sizeable change from the mid-1800s when Sancreed was a 'significant' village with a population of approximately 1,400. Up until the 1940s there was a village public house (the Bird-in-Hand Inn) opposite the church, and a thriving school. Today's smaller community however still makes good use of the village community hall, which close to the church, hosts popular and well attended events.

== History ==
At Carn Euny is a noteworthy prehistoric settlement with considerable evidence of both Iron Age and post-Iron Age settlement. Excavations on this site have shown that there was activity at Carn Euny as early as the Neolithic period. There is evidence that shows that the first timber huts were built about 200 BC, but by the 1st century BC, these had been replaced by stone huts. The remains of these stone huts are still visible today as is the fogou, an underground man-made passage of unknown purpose.

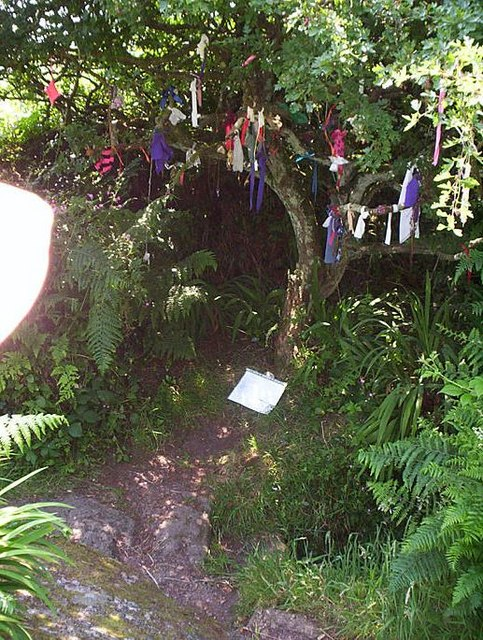
Sancreed holy well

Like many Cornish communities Sancreed can trace its foundation by a legendary saint, in this case St Credan or Sancredus, a follower of St Petroc of Bodmin and Padstow. The church itself is pre-dated by the holy well and baptistry of Sancreed, a few hundred metres west of the church; the site was rediscovered by the vicar of Sancreed in the late 19th century. The wells and baptistry are of a similar age in both respects to those at Madron; as at Madron there is a tradition of hanging clooties (small strips of cloth) on the trees surrounding the well (a clootie well). The well is also known as St Uny's well. Next to the grade II listed baptistry ruin there is a modern Celtic cross (erected in 1910) which is a copy of a medieval cross in Illogan churchyard.

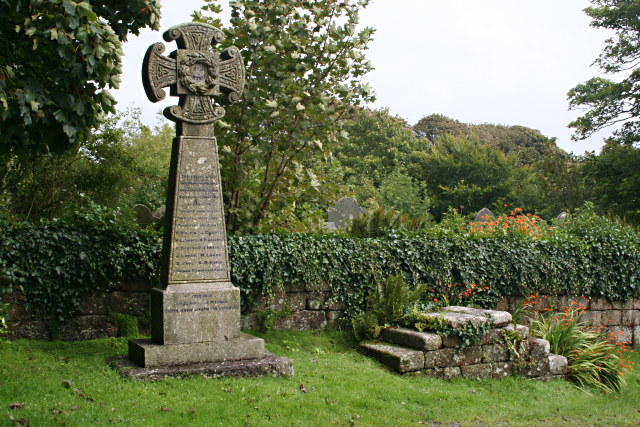
Sancreed war memorial

At the heart of the village lies the Parish Church itself (Grade II listed), parts of the which date back to the 13th and 14th century following the usual early cruciform plan. It has an unbuttressed west tower of two stages, a north transept, and a 15th-century south aisle of five bays. Within the building is a fine font of the St Ives type which also dates from the 14th century, and the rood screen has curious carvings at the base. Much of the church was restored in the late Victorian period and together with the churchyard and church have within the late 19th and first part of the 20th century held a strong appeal to painters of the Newlyn School, some of whom worshipped regularly at the church and are buried in the churchyard (including Stanhope Alexander Forbes, Elizabeth Adela Forbes and Thomas Cooper Gotch).

About 1150 the church was given to Tewkesbury Abbey but in 1242 it was transferred to the Dean and Chapter of Exeter. It was appropriated to the Dean and Chapter in 1300 and the benefice became a vicarage. In 1667 the parishioners took action against the vicar in the episcopal court for making jokes at their expense when preaching.

As well as the holy well near the church there are remains of "the famous healing springs of St Uny" at Chapel Uny. At Bosence are the remains of a 13th-century chapel.

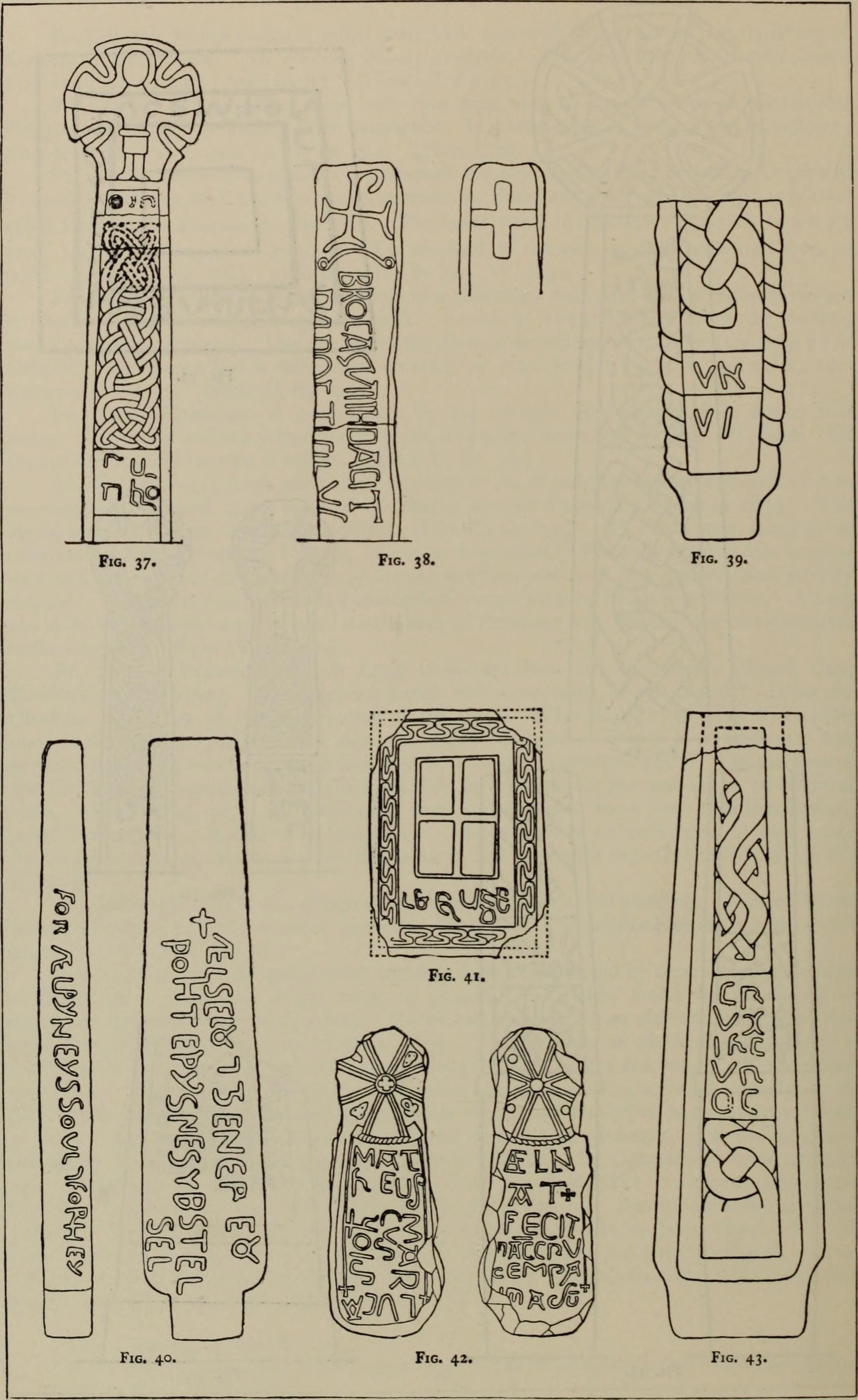
An illustration from The Victoria History of the County of Cornwall (1906); fig. 37 shows one of the ornamented crosses in the churchyard

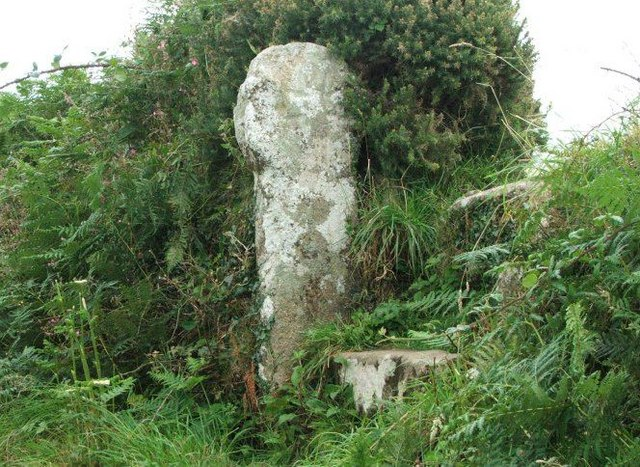
Brane cross

Arthur Langdon (1896) recorded the existence of eight stone crosses in the parish, including four in the churchyard. One is at Anjarden; one of the crosses in the churchyard was found at Trannack and another at Sellan. Two more crosses in the churchyard are ornamented; the heads are unusual and the only ones of their type and the shafts are ornamented, in one case on all four sides and in the other on three sides. These two crosses are Hiberno-Saxon and both have the same unusual shape of the heads, with a crucifixus on one side. There is also a cross at Brane which serves as a boundary stone between Brane and Boswarthen. Another cross at Lower Drift was found about 1850 and there is yet another at Trenuggo Hill.

== Local government ==
For the purposes of local government Sancreed is a civil parish and elects its own parish council every four years. The principal local authority is Cornwall Council.

== Famous people ==
- George Grenfell was born on 21 August 1849, in Sancreed and was a missionary and explorer. He died of Blackwater fever on 1 July 1906, in Basoko, Congo Free State (now the Democratic Republic of the Congo).

== See also ==
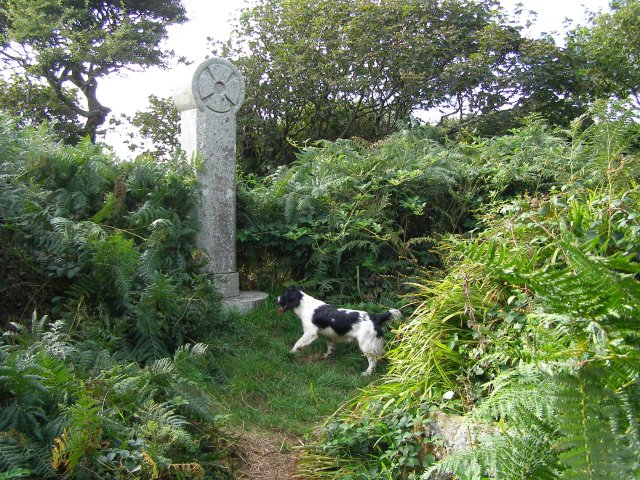
Stone cross at Sancreed Chapel and Well

- Wish Tree
