= List of United Kingdom locations: Low-Loz =

The United Kingdom

This is part of the list of United Kingdom locations: a gazetteer of place names in the United Kingdom showing each place's locality and geographical coordinates.

== Low ==
=== Low A – Low El ===
| Location | Locality | Coordinates (links to map & photo sources) | OS grid reference |
|---|---|---|---|
| Low Ackworth | Wakefield | 53.64°N 01.33°W | SE4417 |
| Low Alwinton | Northumberland | 55.33°N 02.12°W | NT9205 |
| Low Angerton | Northumberland | 55.15°N 01.86°W | NZ0984 |
| Lowbands | Gloucestershire | 51.97°N 02.33°W | SO7731 |
| Low Barlings | Lincolnshire | 53.24°N 00.38°W | TF0873 |
| Low Barugh | Barnsley | 53.56°N 01.53°W | SE3108 |
| Low Bentham | North Yorkshire | 54.11°N 02.55°W | SD6469 |
| Low Biggins | Cumbria | 54.19°N 02.61°W | SD6078 |
| Low Blantyre | South Lanarkshire | 55.78°N 04.09°W | NS6957 |
| Low Borrowbridge | Cumbria | 54.40°N 02.60°W | NY6101 |
| Low Bradfield | Sheffield | 53.41°N 01.61°W | SK2691 |
| Low Bradley | North Yorkshire | 53.92°N 02.00°W | SE0048 |
| Low Braithwaite | Cumbria | 54.77°N 02.90°W | NY4242 |
| Low Bridge | Wiltshire | 51.45°N 02.03°W | ST9873 |
| Low Burnham | North Lincolnshire | 53.50°N 00.82°W | SE7802 |
| Lowca | Cumbria | 54.57°N 03.57°W | NX9821 |
| Low Catton | East Riding of Yorkshire | 53.97°N 00.92°W | SE7053 |
| Low Common | Norfolk | 52.47°N 01.14°E | TM1491 |
| Low Common | Oldham | 53.56°N 02.12°W | SD9208 |
| Low Coniscliffe | North Yorkshire | 54.51°N 01.63°W | NZ2413 |
| Low Cotehill | Cumbria | 54.84°N 02.82°W | NY4750 |
| Low Coylton | South Ayrshire | 55.43°N 04.49°W | NS4219 |
| Lowcross Hill | Cheshire | 53.05°N 02.80°W | SJ4651 |
| Low Dalby | North Yorkshire | 54.27°N 00.69°W | SE8587 |
| Lowdham | Nottinghamshire | 53.00°N 01.01°W | SK6646 |
| Low Dinsdale | Darlington | 54.49°N 01.47°W | NZ3411 |
| Lowe | Shropshire | 52.86°N 02.75°W | SJ4930 |
| Lowedges | Sheffield | 53.32°N 01.48°W | SK3580 |
| Lowe Hill | Staffordshire | 53.09°N 02.01°W | SJ9955 |
| Low Eighton | Gateshead | 54.90°N 01.59°W | NZ2657 |
| Low Ellington | North Yorkshire | 54.24°N 01.69°W | SE2083 |

=== Lower A – Lower E ===
| Location | Locality | Coordinates (links to map & photo sources) | OS grid reference |
|---|---|---|---|
| Lower Aisholt | Somerset | 51.10°N 03.14°W | ST2035 |
| Lower Allscott | Shropshire | 52.56°N 02.39°W | SO7396 |
| Lower Altofts | Wakefield | 53.71°N 01.42°W | SE3824 |
| Lower Amble | Cornwall | 50.53°N 04.85°W | SW9874 |
| Lower Ansty | Dorset | 50.82°N 02.34°W | ST7603 |
| Lower Arboll | Highland | 57.81°N 03.92°W | NH8682 |
| Lower Ardtun | Argyll and Bute | 56.31°N 06.23°W | NM3822 |
| Lower Arncott | Oxfordshire | 51.85°N 01.13°W | SP6018 |
| Lower Ashtead | Surrey | 51.30°N 00.32°W | TQ1757 |
| Lower Ashton | Devon | 50.64°N 03.64°W | SX8484 |
| Lower Assendon | Oxfordshire | 51.55°N 00.93°W | SU7484 |
| Lower Auchenreath | Moray | 57.65°N 03.05°W | NJ3763 |
| Lower Badcall | Highland | 58.32°N 05.14°W | NC1642 |
| Lower Ballam | Lancashire | 53.76°N 02.97°W | SD3630 |
| Lower Bartle | Lancashire | 53.79°N 02.77°W | SD4933 |
| Lower Basildon | Berkshire | 51.49°N 01.12°W | SU6178 |
| Lower Bassingthorpe | Lincolnshire | 52.85°N 00.57°W | SK9629 |
| Lower Bearwood | Herefordshire | 52.20°N 02.89°W | SO3957 |
| Lower Bebington | Wirral | 53.34°N 03.00°W | SJ3383 |
| Lower Beeding | West Sussex | 51.02°N 00.26°W | TQ2227 |
| Lower Belvedere | Bexley | 51.497°N 00.158°E | TQ499798 |
| Lower Benefield | Northamptonshire | 52.48°N 00.55°W | SP9888 |
| Lower Bentley | Worcestershire | 52.28°N 02.03°W | SO9865 |
| Lower Beobridge | Shropshire | 52.51°N 02.32°W | SO7891 |
| Lower Berry Hill | Gloucestershire | 51.79°N 02.62°W | SO5711 |
| Lower Binton | Warwickshire | 52.17°N 01.79°W | SP1453 |
| Lower Birchwood | Derbyshire | 53.08°N 01.35°W | SK4354 |
| Lower Bitchet | Kent | 51.26°N 00.23°E | TQ5654 |
| Lower Blandford St Mary | Dorset | 50.84°N 02.15°W | ST8905 |
| Lower Blunsdon | Swindon | 51.61°N 01.79°W | SU1491 |
| Lower Bobbingworth Green | Essex | 51.72°N 00.19°E | TL5205 |
| Lower Bockhampton | Dorset | 50.70°N 02.39°W | SY7290 |
| Lower Boddington | Northamptonshire | 52.16°N 01.29°W | SP4852 |
| Lower Bodham | Norfolk | 52.90°N 01.13°E | TG1139 |
| Lower Bodinnar | Cornwall | 50.13°N 05.61°W | SW4232 |
| Lower Bois | Buckinghamshire | 51.69°N 00.61°W | SP9600 |
| Lower Bordean | Hampshire | 51.01°N 01.01°W | SU6924 |
| Lower Boscaswell | Cornwall | 50.14°N 05.68°W | SW3734 |
| Lower Bourne | Surrey | 51.18°N 00.79°W | SU8444 |
| Lower Bradley | Wolverhampton | 52.55°N 02.07°W | SO9595 |
| Lower Brailes | Warwickshire | 52.04°N 01.54°W | SP3139 |
| Lower Breakish | Highland | 57.23°N 05.86°W | NG6723 |
| Lower Bredbury | Stockport | 53.41°N 02.13°W | SJ9191 |
| Lower Breinton | Herefordshire | 52.04°N 02.77°W | SO4739 |
| Lower Broadheath | Worcestershire | 52.21°N 02.27°W | SO8157 |
| Lower Brook | Hampshire | 51.04°N 01.53°W | SU3327 |
| Lower Broughton | Salford | 53.48°N 02.27°W | SJ8299 |
| Lower Brynamman | Neath Port Talbot | 51.80°N 03.88°W | SN7013 |
| Lower Brynn | Cornwall | 50.42°N 04.83°W | SW9962 |
| Lower Buckenhill | Herefordshire | 51.99°N 02.58°W | SO6033 |
| Lower Buckland | Hampshire | 50.76°N 01.54°W | SZ3296 |
| Lower Bullingham | Herefordshire | 52.03°N 02.70°W | SO5238 |
| Lower Bullington | Hampshire | 51.16°N 01.35°W | SU4541 |
| Lower Bunbury | Cheshire | 53.10°N 02.65°W | SJ5657 |
| Lower Burgate | Hampshire | 50.93°N 01.78°W | SU1515 |
| Lower Burrow | Somerset | 50.97°N 02.84°W | ST4120 |
| Lower Burton | Herefordshire | 52.19°N 02.85°W | SO4256 |
| Lower Bush | Kent | 51.37°N 00.42°E | TQ6967 |
| Lower Cadsden | Buckinghamshire | 51.72°N 00.81°W | SP8204 |
| Lower Caldecote | Bedfordshire | 52.10°N 00.29°W | TL1746 |
| Lower Cam | Gloucestershire | 51.69°N 02.37°W | SO7400 |
| Lower Canada | North Somerset | 51.31°N 02.93°W | ST3558 |
| Lower Carden | Cheshire | 53.06°N 02.82°W | SJ4552 |
| Lower Catesby | Northamptonshire | 52.22°N 01.25°W | SP5159 |
| Lower Cator | Devon | 50.56°N 03.86°W | SX6876 |
| Lower Caversham | Berkshire | 51.46°N 00.96°W | SU7274 |
| Lower Chapel | Powys | 52.00°N 03.42°W | SO0235 |
| Lower Chedworth | Gloucestershire | 51.78°N 01.91°W | SP0610 |
| Lower Cheriton | Devon | 50.80°N 03.27°W | ST1001 |
| Lower Chicksgrove | Wiltshire | 51.06°N 02.04°W | ST9730 |
| Lower Chute | Wiltshire | 51.27°N 01.55°W | SU3153 |
| Lower Clapton | Hackney | 51.54°N 00.05°W | TQ3585 |
| Lower Clent | Worcestershire | 52.40°N 02.13°W | SO9179 |
| Lower Clicker | Cornwall | 50.42°N 04.42°W | SX2861 |
| Lower Clopton | Warwickshire | 52.21°N 01.72°W | SP1957 |
| Lower Common (Ellisfield, Basingstoke and Dean) | Hampshire | 51.19°N 01.09°W | SU6344 |
| Lower Common (Eversley, Hart) | Hampshire | 51.35°N 00.90°W | SU7662 |
| Lower Common (Gilwern) | Monmouthshire | 51.82°N 03.10°W | SO2415 |
| Lower Common (Glascoed) | Monmouthshire | 51.69°N 02.97°W | SO3300 |
| Lower Common | Shropshire | 52.64°N 02.81°W | SJ4505 |
| Lower Copthurst | Lancashire | 53.68°N 02.62°W | SD5921 |
| Lower Cousley Wood | East Sussex | 51.07°N 00.36°E | TQ6633 |
| Lower Cox Street | Kent | 51.31°N 00.59°E | TQ8160 |
| Lower Creedy | Devon | 50.80°N 03.64°W | SS8402 |
| Lower Croan | Cornwall | 50.50°N 04.79°W | SX0271 |
| Lower Crossings | Derbyshire | 53.31°N 01.94°W | SK0480 |
| Lower Cumberworth | Kirklees | 53.57°N 01.66°W | SE2209 |
| Lower Daggons | Hampshire | 50.91°N 01.87°W | SU0913 |
| Lower Darwen | Lancashire | 53.72°N 02.48°W | SD6825 |
| Lower Dean | Bedfordshire | 52.30°N 00.46°W | TL0569 |
| Lower Dean | Devon | 50.46°N 03.79°W | SX7364 |
| Lower Denby | Barnsley | 53.55°N 01.65°W | SE2307 |
| Lower Diabaig | Highland | 57.57°N 05.69°W | NG7960 |
| Lower Dicker | East Sussex | 50.87°N 00.20°E | TQ5511 |
| Lower Dinchope | Shropshire | 52.45°N 02.81°W | SO4584 |
| Lower Dounreay | Highland | 58.57°N 03.75°W | NC9866 |
| Lower Dowdeswell | Gloucestershire | 51.86°N 02.00°W | SP0019 |
| Lower Down | Shropshire | 52.45°N 02.98°W | SO3384 |
| Lower Drummond | Highland | 57.45°N 04.23°W | NH6643 |
| Lower Dunsforth | North Yorkshire | 54.07°N 01.32°W | SE4464 |
| Lower Durston | Somerset | 51.04°N 03.01°W | ST2928 |
| Lower Earley | Berkshire | 51.42°N 00.92°W | SU7570 |
| Lower East Carleton | Norfolk | 52.58°N 01.21°E | TG1803 |
| Lower Eastern Green | Coventry | 52.40°N 01.57°W | SP2979 |
| Lower Edmonton | Enfield | 51.62°N 00.06°W | TQ3493 |
| Lower Egleton | Herefordshire | 52.10°N 02.55°W | SO6245 |
| Lower Elkstone | Staffordshire | 53.11°N 01.91°W | SK0658 |
| Lower Ellastone | Staffordshire | 52.97°N 01.83°W | SK1142 |
| Lower Elsted | West Sussex | 50.97°N 00.81°W | SU8320 |
| Lower End | Bedfordshire | 51.88°N 00.59°W | SP9722 |
| Lower End (Long Crendon) | Buckinghamshire | 51.77°N 01.01°W | SP6809 |
| Lower End (Thornborough) | Buckinghamshire | 51.99°N 00.93°W | SP7333 |
| Lower End | Gloucestershire | 51.73°N 02.01°W | SO9904 |
| Lower End | Milton Keynes | 52.02°N 00.64°W | SP9337 |
| Lower End (Grendon) | Northamptonshire | 52.24°N 00.71°W | SP8861 |
| Lower End (Brafield-on-the-Green) | Northamptonshire | 52.22°N 00.81°W | SP8159 |
| Lower End (Hartwell) | Northamptonshire | 52.14°N 00.86°W | SP7850 |
| Lower End | Oxfordshire | 51.83°N 01.53°W | SP3215 |
| Lower Everleigh | Wiltshire | 51.28°N 01.74°W | SU1854 |
| Lower Eype | Dorset | 50.71°N 02.79°W | SY4491 |
| Lower Eythorne | Kent | 51.19°N 01.26°E | TR2849 |

=== Lower F – Lower M ===
| Location | Locality | Coordinates (links to map & photo sources) | OS grid reference |
|---|---|---|---|
| Lower Failand | North Somerset | 51.45°N 02.70°W | ST5173 |
| Lower Faintree | Shropshire | 52.48°N 02.51°W | SO6588 |
| Lower Falkenham | Suffolk | 51.99°N 01.33°E | TM2938 |
| Lower Farringdon | Hampshire | 51.11°N 01.00°W | SU7035 |
| Lower Feltham | Surrey | 51.42°N 00.43°W | TQ0971 |
| Lower Fittleworth | West Sussex | 50.95°N 00.57°W | TQ0018 |
| Lowerford | Lancashire | 53.84°N 02.22°W | SD8539 |
| Lower Forge | Shropshire | 52.49°N 02.39°W | SO7389 |
| Lower Foxdale | Isle of Man | 54.17°N 04.65°W | SC2779 |
| Lower Frankton | Shropshire | 52.87°N 02.95°W | SJ3631 |
| Lower Freystrop | Pembrokeshire | 51.76°N 04.97°W | SM9512 |
| Lower Froyle | Hampshire | 51.19°N 00.91°W | SU7644 |
| Lower Gabwell | Devon | 50.51°N 03.53°W | SX9169 |
| Lower Gledfield | Highland | 57.87°N 04.37°W | NH5990 |
| Lower Godney | Somerset | 51.17°N 02.75°W | ST4742 |
| Lower Goldstone | Kent | 51.30°N 01.28°E | TR2961 |
| Lower Gornal | Dudley | 52.51°N 02.11°W | SO9291 |
| Lower Grange | Bradford | 53.79°N 01.81°W | SE1233 |
| Lower Gravenhurst | Bedfordshire | 52.00°N 00.38°W | TL1135 |
| Lower Green | Berkshire | 51.37°N 01.49°W | SU3564 |
| Lower Green (Wethersfield) | Essex | 51.95°N 00.51°E | TL7331 |
| Lower Green (Langley) | Essex | 51.98°N 00.08°E | TL4334 |
| Lower Green (Sandon) | Essex | 51.70°N 00.51°E | TL7404 |
| Lower Green (Galleywood) | Essex | 51.69°N 00.45°E | TL7002 |
| Lower Green (Ickleford) | Hertfordshire | 51.97°N 00.28°W | TL1832 |
| Lower Green (Meesden) | Hertfordshire | 51.97°N 00.06°E | TL4233 |
| Lower Green (Rusthall) | Kent | 51.13°N 00.22°E | TQ5640 |
| Lower Green (Pembury) | Kent | 51.14°N 00.31°E | TQ6241 |
| Lower Green | Norfolk | 52.89°N 00.95°E | TF9937 |
| Lower Green | Staffordshire | 52.66°N 02.14°W | SJ9007 |
| Lower Green | Suffolk | 52.25°N 00.54°E | TL7465 |
| Lower Green | Surrey | 51.38°N 00.37°W | TQ1366 |
| Lower Green | Warwickshire | 52.30°N 01.26°W | SP5068 |
| Lower Green | Wigan | 53.48°N 02.45°W | SJ7099 |
| Lower Grove Common | Herefordshire | 51.92°N 02.65°W | SO5525 |
| Lower Hacheston | Suffolk | 52.15°N 01.37°E | TM3156 |
| Lower Halistra | Highland | 57.53°N 06.61°W | NG2459 |
| Lower Halliford | Surrey | 51.39°N 00.44°W | TQ0867 |
| Lower Halstock Leigh | Dorset | 50.86°N 02.68°W | ST5207 |
| Lower Halstow | Kent | 51.37°N 00.67°E | TQ8667 |
| Lower Hamswell | South Gloucestershire | 51.43°N 02.38°W | ST7371 |
| Lower Hamworthy | Poole | 50.70°N 02.00°W | SZ0090 |
| Lower Hardres | Kent | 51.23°N 01.07°E | TR1553 |
| Lower Hardwick | Herefordshire | 52.19°N 02.87°W | SO4056 |
| Lower Harpton | Herefordshire | 52.23°N 03.07°W | SO2760 |
| Lower Hartlip | Kent | 51.34°N 00.64°E | TQ8464 |
| Lower Hartshay | Derbyshire | 53.05°N 01.43°W | SK3851 |
| Lower Hartwell | Buckinghamshire | 51.80°N 00.85°W | SP7912 |
| Lower Hatton | Staffordshire | 52.92°N 02.26°W | SJ8236 |
| Lower Hawthwaite | Cumbria | 54.29°N 03.21°W | SD2189 |
| Lower Haysden | Kent | 51.18°N 00.23°E | TQ5645 |
| Lower Hayton | Shropshire | 52.42°N 02.73°W | SO5081 |
| Lower Hazel | South Gloucestershire | 51.58°N 02.54°W | ST6287 |
| Lower Heath | Cheshire | 53.17°N 02.21°W | SJ8664 |
| Lower Heppington | Kent | 51.23°N 01.06°E | TR1453 |
| Lower Hergest | Herefordshire | 52.18°N 03.06°W | SO2755 |
| Lower Herne | Kent | 51.35°N 01.12°E | TR1866 |
| Lower Heyford | Oxfordshire | 51.91°N 01.30°W | SP4824 |
| Lower Heysham | Lancashire | 54.04°N 02.90°W | SD4161 |
| Lower Higham | Kent | 51.43°N 00.45°E | TQ7173 |
| Lower Highmoor | Oxfordshire | 51.55°N 00.99°W | SU7085 |
| Lower Holbrook | Suffolk | 51.97°N 01.15°E | TM1735 |
| Lower Holditch | Devon | 50.81°N 02.95°W | ST3302 |
| Lower Holloway | Islington | 51.54°N 00.12°W | TQ3085 |
| Lower Holwell | Dorset | 50.90°N 01.90°W | SU0712 |
| Lower Hook | Worcestershire | 52.05°N 02.27°W | SO8140 |
| Lower Hookner | Devon | 50.62°N 03.82°W | SX7182 |
| Lower Hopton | Kirklees | 53.66°N 01.71°W | SE1919 |
| Lower Hopton | Shropshire | 52.77°N 02.93°W | SJ3720 |
| Lower Hordley | Shropshire | 52.85°N 02.90°W | SJ3929 |
| Lower Horncroft | West Sussex | 50.94°N 00.57°W | TQ0017 |
| Lower Horsebridge | East Sussex | 50.87°N 00.23°E | TQ5711 |
| Lowerhouse | Cheshire | 53.29°N 02.12°W | SJ9277 |
| Lowerhouse | Lancashire | 53.78°N 02.28°W | SD8132 |
| Lower House | Cheshire | 53.35°N 02.75°W | SJ5085 |
| Lowerhouses | Kirklees | 53.63°N 01.77°W | SE1515 |
| Lower Howsell | Worcestershire | 52.13°N 02.32°W | SO7848 |
| Lower Illey | Worcestershire | 52.42°N 02.04°W | SO9781 |
| Lower Island | Kent | 51.35°N 01.01°E | TR1066 |
| Lower Kersal | Salford | 53.50°N 02.28°W | SD8101 |
| Lower Kilburn | Derbyshire | 53.00°N 01.45°W | SK3745 |
| Lower Kilchattan | Argyll and Bute | 56.06°N 06.24°W | NR3694 |
| Lower Kilcott | Gloucestershire | 51.59°N 02.31°W | ST7889 |
| Lower Kingcombe | Dorset | 50.78°N 02.63°W | SY5599 |
| Lower Kingswood | Surrey | 51.26°N 00.22°W | TQ2453 |
| Lower Kinnerton | Cheshire | 53.15°N 02.98°W | SJ3462 |
| Lower Kinsham | Herefordshire | 52.27°N 02.95°W | SO3564 |
| Lower Knapp | Somerset | 51.02°N 02.99°W | ST3025 |
| Lower Knightley | Staffordshire | 52.80°N 02.26°W | SJ8223 |
| Lower Knowle | City of Bristol | 51.42°N 02.59°W | ST5970 |
| Lower Langford | North Somerset | 51.33°N 02.77°W | ST4660 |
| Lower Largo | Fife | 56.20°N 02.95°W | NO4102 |
| Lower Layham | Suffolk | 52.02°N 00.95°E | TM0340 |
| Lower Ledwyche | Shropshire | 52.36°N 02.69°W | SO5374 |
| Lower Leigh | Staffordshire | 52.92°N 01.98°W | SK0136 |
| Lower Lemington | Gloucestershire | 52.00°N 01.69°W | SP2134 |
| Lower Lode | Gloucestershire | 51.97°N 02.19°W | SO8731 |
| Lower Lovacott | Devon | 51.02°N 04.11°W | SS5227 |
| Lower Loxhore | Devon | 51.11°N 03.98°W | SS6137 |
| Lower Lydbrook | Gloucestershire | 51.84°N 02.59°W | SO5916 |
| Lower Lye | Herefordshire | 52.28°N 02.88°W | SO4066 |
| Lower Machen | Newport | 51.58°N 03.12°W | ST2288 |
| Lower Maes-coed | Herefordshire | 51.96°N 02.96°W | SO3430 |
| Lower Mains | Clackmannan | 56.15°N 03.69°W | NS9597 |
| Lower Mannington | Dorset | 50.84°N 01.91°W | SU0605 |
| Lower Marsh | Somerset | 50.97°N 02.37°W | ST7420 |
| Lower Marston | Somerset | 51.19°N 02.34°W | ST7644 |
| Lower Meend | Gloucestershire | 51.73°N 02.65°W | SO5504 |
| Lower Menadue | Cornwall | 50.39°N 04.77°W | SX0359 |
| Lower Merridge | Somerset | 51.09°N 03.14°W | ST2034 |
| Lower Mickletown | Leeds | 53.73°N 01.39°W | SE4027 |
| Lower Middleton Cheney | Northamptonshire | 52.06°N 01.27°W | SP5041 |
| Lower Midway | Derbyshire | 52.77°N 01.55°W | SK3020 |
| Lower Mill | Cornwall | 50.20°N 04.94°W | SW9038 |
| Lower Milovaig | Highland | 57.45°N 06.77°W | NG1450 |
| Lower Milton | Somerset | 51.22°N 02.67°W | ST5347 |
| Lower Moor | Wiltshire | 51.61°N 01.97°W | SU0291 |
| Lower Moor | Worcestershire | 52.123°N 02.035°W | SO979469 |
| Lower Morton | South Gloucestershire | 51.61°N 02.52°W | ST6491 |
| Lower Mountain | Flintshire | 53.12°N 03.03°W | SJ3159 |

=== Lower N – Lowez ===
| Location | Locality | Coordinates (links to map & photo sources) | OS grid reference |
|---|---|---|---|
| Lower Nazeing | Essex | 51.73°N 00.01°E | TL3906 |
| Lower Netchwood | Shropshire | 52.51°N 02.56°W | SO6291 |
| Lower New Inn | Torfaen | 51.67°N 03.01°W | ST3098 |
| Lower Nobut | Staffordshire | 52.90°N 01.94°W | SK0434 |
| Lower North Dean | Buckinghamshire | 51.67°N 00.77°W | SU8598 |
| Lower Norton | Warwickshire | 52.26°N 01.66°W | SP2363 |
| Lower Nyland | Somerset | 50.98°N 02.37°W | ST7421 |
| Lower Ochrwyth | Caerphilly | 51.59°N 03.09°W | ST2489 |
| Lower Odcombe | Somerset | 50.93°N 02.69°W | ST5115 |
| Lower Oddington | Gloucestershire | 51.92°N 01.66°W | SP2325 |
| Lower Ollach | Highland | 57.35°N 06.14°W | NG5137 |
| Lower Padworth | Berkshire | 51.39°N 01.13°W | SU6067 |
| Lower Penarth | The Vale Of Glamorgan | 51.42°N 03.18°W | ST1870 |
| Lower Penn | Staffordshire | 52.55°N 02.19°W | SO8795 |
| Lower Pennington | Hampshire | 50.73°N 01.56°W | SZ3193 |
| Lower Penwortham | Lancashire | 53.74°N 02.71°W | SD5328 |
| Lower Peover | Cheshire | 53.26°N 02.40°W | SJ7374 |
| Lower Pexhill | Cheshire | 53.23°N 02.19°W | SJ8771 |
| Lower Pilsley | Derbyshire | 53.16°N 01.38°W | SK4163 |
| Lower Pitkerrie | Highland | 57.79°N 03.91°W | NH8680 |
| Lower Place | Brent | 51.53°N 00.27°W | TQ2083 |
| Lower Place | Rochdale | 53.59°N 02.15°W | SD9011 |
| Lower Pollicott | Buckinghamshire | 51.80°N 00.98°W | SP7012 |
| Lower Porthkerry | The Vale Of Glamorgan | 51.38°N 03.33°W | ST0766 |
| Lower Porthpean | Cornwall | 50.31°N 04.76°W | SX0350 |
| Lower Quinton | Warwickshire | 52.12°N 01.73°W | SP1847 |
| Lower Rabber | Herefordshire | 52.17°N 03.09°W | SO2554 |
| Lower Race | Torfaen | 51.69°N 03.05°W | SO2700 |
| Lower Radley | Oxfordshire | 51.67°N 01.23°W | SU5398 |
| Lower Rainham | Kent | 51.37°N 00.59°E | TQ8167 |
| Lower Ratley | Hampshire | 51.00°N 01.54°W | SU3223 |
| Lower Raydon | Suffolk | 52.00°N 00.95°E | TM0338 |
| Lower Rea | Gloucestershire | 51.83°N 02.29°W | SO8015 |
| Lower Ridge | Devon | 50.80°N 03.09°W | ST2301 |
| Lower Ridge | Shropshire | 52.88°N 02.98°W | SJ3432 |
| Lower Roadwater | Somerset | 51.13°N 03.38°W | ST0338 |
| Lower Rose | Cornwall | 50.34°N 05.12°W | SW7854 |
| Lower Row | Dorset | 50.83°N 01.94°W | SU0404 |
| Lower Sapey | Worcestershire | 52.23°N 02.45°W | SO6960 |
| Lower Seagry | Wiltshire | 51.51°N 02.07°W | ST9580 |
| Lower Sheering | Essex | 51.80°N 00.15°E | TL4914 |
| Lower Shelton | Bedfordshire | 52.06°N 00.55°W | SP9942 |
| Lower Shiplake | Oxfordshire | 51.50°N 00.89°W | SU7779 |
| Lower Shuckburgh | Warwickshire | 52.25°N 01.28°W | SP4962 |
| Lower Sketty | Swansea | 51.60°N 04.00°W | SS6191 |
| Lower Slackstead | Hampshire | 51.02°N 01.44°W | SU3925 |
| Lower Slade | Devon | 51.18°N 04.13°W | SS5145 |
| Lower Slaughter | Gloucestershire | 51.89°N 01.76°W | SP1622 |
| Lower Solva | Pembrokeshire | 51.87°N 05.19°W | SM8024 |
| Lower Soothill | Kirklees | 53.71°N 01.62°W | SE2524 |
| Lower Soudley | Gloucestershire | 51.77°N 02.49°W | SO6609 |
| Lower Southfield | Herefordshire | 52.07°N 02.45°W | SO6942 |
| Lower Stanton St Quintin | Wiltshire | 51.52°N 02.13°W | ST9181 |
| Lower Stoke | Coventry | 52.39°N 01.48°W | SP3578 |
| Lower Stoke | Kent | 51.44°N 00.63°E | TQ8375 |
| Lower Stondon | Bedfordshire | 52.00°N 00.32°W | TL1535 |
| Lower Stone | South Gloucestershire | 51.64°N 02.47°W | ST6794 |
| Lower Stonnall | Staffordshire | 52.62°N 01.88°W | SK0803 |
| Lower Stow Bedon | Norfolk | 52.50°N 00.88°E | TL9694 |
| Lower Stratton | Somerset | 50.93°N 02.79°W | ST4415 |
| Lower Stratton | Swindon | 51.56°N 01.75°W | SU1785 |
| Lower Street | East Sussex | 50.88°N 00.41°E | TQ7012 |
| Lower Street (Southrepps) | Norfolk | 52.86°N 01.35°E | TG2635 |
| Lower Street (Wickmere) | Norfolk | 52.86°N 01.20°E | TG1634 |
| Lower Street (Stansfield) | Suffolk | 52.13°N 00.59°E | TL7852 |
| Lower Street (Stutton) | Suffolk | 51.96°N 01.12°E | TM1534 |
| Lower Strensham | Worcestershire | 52.05°N 02.14°W | SO9040 |
| Lower Stretton | Cheshire | 53.32°N 02.57°W | SJ6281 |
| Lower Strode | Dorset | 50.78°N 02.78°W | SY4599 |
| Lower Studley | Wiltshire | 51.31°N 02.21°W | ST8557 |
| Lower Sundon | Bedfordshire | 51.93°N 00.47°W | TL0527 |
| Lower Swainswick | Bath and North East Somerset | 51.40°N 02.34°W | ST7667 |
| Lower Swanwick | Hampshire | 50.87°N 01.30°W | SU4909 |
| Lower Swell | Gloucestershire | 51.92°N 01.75°W | SP1725 |
| Lower Sydenham | Bromley | 51.42°N 00.05°W | TQ3571 |
| Lower Tadmarton | Oxfordshire | 52.03°N 01.41°W | SP4037 |
| Lower Tale | Devon | 50.80°N 03.33°W | ST0601 |
| Lower Tasburgh | Norfolk | 52.51°N 01.22°E | TM1996 |
| Lower Tean | Staffordshire | 52.93°N 01.98°W | SK0138 |
| Lower Thorpe | Northamptonshire | 52.10°N 01.22°W | SP5345 |
| Lower Threapwood | Wrexham | 52.99°N 02.83°W | SJ4444 |
| Lower Thurlton | Norfolk | 52.53°N 01.56°E | TM4299 |
| Lower Thurnham | Lancashire | 53.97°N 02.84°W | SD4554 |
| Lower Thurvaston | Derbyshire | 52.92°N 01.67°W | SK2236 |
| Lower Todding | Herefordshire | 52.37°N 02.88°W | SO4075 |
| Lowertown (Luxulyan) | Cornwall | 50.41°N 04.74°W | SX0561 |
| Lowertown (Lowertown-by-Helston) | Cornwall | 50.11°N 05.28°W | SW6529 |
| Lowertown | Devon | 50.63°N 04.17°W | SX4684 |
| Lower Town | Bradford | 53.80°N 01.95°W | SE0334 |
| Lower Town | Devon | 50.89°N 03.42°W | ST0012 |
| Lower Town | Herefordshire | 52.07°N 02.54°W | SO6342 |
| Lower Town | Isles of Scilly | 49.96°N 06.31°W | SV9116 |
| Lower Town | Pembrokeshire | 51.99°N 04.97°W | SM9637 |
| Lower Town | Worcestershire | 52.22°N 02.20°W | SO8659 |
| Lower Trebullett | Cornwall | 50.56°N 04.37°W | SX3277 |
| Lower Tuffley | Gloucestershire | 51.82°N 02.26°W | SO8214 |
| Lower Turmer | Hampshire | 50.88°N 01.81°W | SU1309 |
| Lower Twitchen | Devon | 50.93°N 04.29°W | SS3918 |
| Lower Twydall | Kent | 51.37°N 00.58°E | TQ8067 |
| Lower Tysoe | Warwickshire | 52.10°N 01.50°W | SP3445 |
| Lower Upham | Hampshire | 50.96°N 01.26°W | SU5219 |
| Lower Upnor | Kent | 51.41°N 00.52°E | TQ7671 |
| Lower Vexford | Somerset | 51.10°N 03.27°W | ST1135 |
| Lower Wainhill | Oxfordshire | 51.70°N 00.90°W | SP7601 |
| Lower Walton | Cheshire | 53.36°N 02.60°W | SJ6085 |
| Lower Wanborough | Swindon | 51.54°N 01.69°W | SU2183 |
| Lower Weacombe | Somerset | 51.15°N 03.28°W | ST1040 |
| Lower Weald | Buckinghamshire | 52.03°N 00.86°W | SP7838 |
| Lower Wear | Devon | 50.69°N 03.50°W | SX9489 |
| Lower Weare | Somerset | 51.27°N 02.86°W | ST4053 |
| Lower Weedon | Northamptonshire | 52.22°N 01.09°W | SP6259 |
| Lower Welson | Herefordshire | 52.14°N 03.03°W | SO2950 |
| Lower Westholme | Somerset | 51.15°N 02.63°W | ST5640 |
| Lower Westhouse | North Yorkshire | 54.15°N 02.50°W | SD6773 |
| Lower Westmancote | Worcestershire | 52.03°N 02.10°W | SO9337 |
| Lower Weston | Bath and North East Somerset | 51.38°N 02.38°W | ST7365 |
| Lower Whatcombe | Dorset | 50.80°N 02.22°W | ST8401 |
| Lower Whatley | Somerset | 51.22°N 02.37°W | ST7447 |
| Lower Whitehall | Orkney Islands | 59.13°N 02.59°W | HY6628 |
| Lower Whitley | Cheshire | 53.30°N 02.58°W | SJ6179 |
| Lower Wick | Gloucestershire | 51.66°N 02.42°W | ST7196 |
| Lower Wick | Worcestershire | 52.16°N 02.24°W | SO8352 |
| Lower Wield | Hampshire | 51.15°N 01.10°W | SU6340 |
| Lower Willingdon | East Sussex | 50.80°N 00.24°E | TQ5803 |
| Lower Winchendon or Nether Winchendon | Buckinghamshire | 51.80°N 00.94°W | SP7312 |
| Lower Withington | Cheshire | 53.21°N 02.28°W | SJ8169 |
| Lower Wolverton | Worcestershire | 52.14°N 02.11°W | SO9250 |
| Lower Woodend | Aberdeenshire | 57.25°N 02.54°W | NJ6718 |
| Lower Woodend | Buckinghamshire | 51.57°N 00.83°W | SU8187 |
| Lower Woodford | Wiltshire | 51.11°N 01.82°W | SU1235 |
| Lower Woodley | Cornwall | 50.45°N 04.79°W | SX0265 |
| Lower Woodside | Bedfordshire | 51.85°N 00.45°W | TL070185 |
| Lower Woodside | Hertfordshire | 51.73°N 00.20°W | TL2406 |
| Lower Woolston | Somerset | 51.04°N 02.50°W | ST6527 |
| Lower Woon | Cornwall | 50.43°N 04.77°W | SX0363 |
| Lower Wraxall | Dorset | 50.79°N 02.61°W | ST5700 |
| Lower Wraxall | Somerset | 51.11°N 02.57°W | ST6035 |
| Lower Wraxall | Wiltshire | 51.37°N 02.24°W | ST8364 |
| Lower Wych | Wrexham | 52.99°N 02.77°W | SJ4844 |
| Lower Wyche | Herefordshire | 52.09°N 02.33°W | SO7744 |
| Lower Wyke | Bradford | 53.72°N 01.77°W | SE1525 |
| Lower Wyke | Hampshire | 51.23°N 01.41°W | SU409487 |
| Lower Yelland | Devon | 51.06°N 04.15°W | SS4932 |
| Lower Zeals | Wiltshire | 51.08°N 02.30°W | ST7932 |
| Lowes Barn | Durham | 54.76°N 01.59°W | NZ2641 |
| Lowesby | Leicestershire | 52.65°N 00.93°W | SK7207 |
| Lowestoft | Suffolk | 52.46°N 01.73°E | TM5492 |
| Loweswater | Cumbria | 54.56°N 03.33°W | NY1420 |
| Low Etherley | Durham | 54.65°N 01.73°W | NZ1729 |

=== Low F – Low Z ===
| Location | Locality | Coordinates (links to map & photo sources) | OS grid reference |
|---|---|---|---|
| Low Fell | Gateshead | 54.93°N 01.61°W | NZ2560 |
| Lowfield | Sheffield | 53.36°N 01.47°W | SK3585 |
| Lowfield Heath | West Sussex | 51.14°N 00.18°W | TQ2740 |
| Low Fold | Leeds | 53.82°N 01.65°W | SE2337 |
| Lowford | Hampshire | 50.88°N 01.31°W | SU4810 |
| Low Fulney | Lincolnshire | 52.77°N 00.13°W | TF2621 |
| Low Gardham | East Riding of Yorkshire | 53.87°N 00.55°W | SE9542 |
| Low Garth | North Yorkshire | 54.43°N 00.87°W | NZ7305 |
| Low Gate | North Yorkshire | 54.09°N 01.61°W | SE2567 |
| Low Gate | Northumberland | 54.96°N 02.15°W | NY9063 |
| Lowgill | Cumbria | 54.36°N 02.58°W | SD6297 |
| Lowgill | Lancashire | 54.07°N 02.53°W | SD6564 |
| Low Grantley | North Yorkshire | 54.12°N 01.64°W | SE2370 |
| Low Green | Leeds | 53.83°N 01.68°W | SE2138 |
| Low Green | North Yorkshire | 54.02°N 01.69°W | SE2059 |
| Low Green | Suffolk | 52.20°N 00.72°E | TL8660 |
| Low Greenside | Gateshead | 54.95°N 01.78°W | NZ1462 |
| Low Habberley | Worcestershire | 52.39°N 02.29°W | SO8077 |
| Low Ham | Somerset | 51.05°N 02.81°W | ST4329 |
| Low Hauxley | Northumberland | 55.31°N 01.56°W | NU2802 |
| Low Hawsker | North Yorkshire | 54.45°N 00.58°W | NZ9207 |
| Low Hesket | Cumbria | 54.80°N 02.84°W | NY4646 |
| Low Hill | Wolverhampton | 52.60°N 02.11°W | SJ9201 |
| Low Hutton | North Yorkshire | 54.09°N 00.83°W | SE7667 |
| Lowick | Cumbria | 54.26°N 03.09°W | SD2986 |
| Lowick | Northamptonshire | 52.40°N 00.57°W | SP9780 |
| Lowick | Northumberland | 55.64°N 01.98°W | NU0139 |
| Lowick Bridge | Cumbria | 54.26°N 03.09°W | SD2986 |
| Lowick Green | Cumbria | 54.25°N 03.09°W | SD2985 |
| Low Knipe | Cumbria | 54.57°N 02.75°W | NY5120 |
| Low Laithe | North Yorkshire | 54.06°N 01.71°W | SE1963 |
| Low Laithes | Barnsley | 53.53°N 01.42°W | SE3804 |
| Lowlands | Torfaen | 51.65°N 03.02°W | ST2996 |
| Low Leighton | Derbyshire | 53.36°N 02.00°W | SK0085 |
| Low Lorton | Cumbria | 54.61°N 03.31°W | NY1525 |
| Low Marishes | North Yorkshire | 54.18°N 00.74°W | SE8277 |
| Low Marnham | Nottinghamshire | 53.21°N 00.80°W | SK8069 |
| Low Mill | North Yorkshire | 54.34°N 00.97°W | SE6795 |
| Low Moor | Bradford | 53.74°N 01.77°W | SE1528 |
| Low Moor | Lancashire | 53.86°N 02.41°W | SD7341 |
| Low Moorsley | Sunderland | 54.80°N 01.47°W | NZ3446 |
| Low Moresby | Cumbria | 54.56°N 03.56°W | NX9920 |
| Lowna | North Yorkshire | 54.31°N 00.95°W | SE6891 |
| Low Newton | Cumbria | 54.23°N 02.92°W | SD4082 |
| Low Newton-by-the-Sea | Northumberland | 55.50°N 01.62°W | NU2424 |
| Lowood | Scottish Borders | 55.60°N 02.77°W | NT5135 |
| Low Prudhoe | Northumberland | 54.96°N 01.84°W | NZ1063 |
| Low Risby | North Lincolnshire | 53.61°N 00.59°W | SE9314 |
| Low Row (Bromfield) | Cumbria | 54.78°N 03.27°W | NY1844 |
| Low Row (Nether Denton) | Cumbria | 54.96°N 02.65°W | NY5863 |
| Low Row | North Yorkshire | 54.36°N 02.03°W | SD9897 |
| Low Snaygill | North Yorkshire | 53.93°N 02.01°W | SD9949 |
| Lowsonford | Warwickshire | 52.30°N 01.73°W | SP1867 |
| Low Street | Essex | 51.46°N 00.38°E | TQ6677 |
| Low Street | Norfolk | 52.60°N 01.01°E | TG0405 |
| Low Tharston | Norfolk | 52.50°N 01.21°E | TM1895 |
| Lowther | Cumbria | 54.60°N 02.72°W | NY5323 |
| Lowthertown | Dumfries and Galloway | 54.98°N 03.18°W | NY2466 |
| Lowtherville | Isle of Wight | 50.59°N 01.22°W | SZ5578 |
| Low Thornley | Gateshead | 54.93°N 01.73°W | NZ1760 |
| Lowthorpe | East Riding of Yorkshire | 54.02°N 00.35°W | TA0860 |
| Lowton | Somerset | 50.95°N 03.15°W | ST1918 |
| Lowton | Wigan | 53.46°N 02.57°W | SJ6297 |
| Lowton Common | Wigan | 53.46°N 02.55°W | SJ6397 |
| Lowton Heath | Wigan | 53.45°N 02.58°W | SJ6196 |
| Lowton St Mary's | Wigan | 53.46°N 02.55°W | SJ6397 |
| Low Torry | Fife | 56.05°N 03.59°W | NT0186 |
| Low Town | Shropshire | 52.53°N 02.41°W | SO7293 |
| Low Toynton | Lincolnshire | 53.21°N 00.09°W | TF2770 |
| Low Valley | Barnsley | 53.52°N 01.39°W | SE4003 |
| Low Valleyfield | Fife | 56.05°N 03.60°W | NT0086 |
| Low Walton | Cumbria | 54.50°N 03.57°W | NX9813 |
| Low Walworth | Darlington | 54.54°N 01.64°W | NZ2317 |
| Low Waters | South Lanarkshire | 55.75°N 04.04°W | NS7253 |
| Low Westwood | Durham | 54.89°N 01.82°W | NZ1156 |
| Low Whinnow | Cumbria | 54.84°N 03.09°W | NY3050 |
| Low Whita | North Yorkshire | 54.37°N 02.00°W | SE0098 |
| Low Wood | Cumbria | 54.23°N 03.01°W | SD3483 |
| Low Worsall | North Yorkshire | 54.47°N 01.39°W | NZ3909 |

== Lox – Loz ==
| Location | Locality | Coordinates (links to map & photo sources) | OS grid reference |
|---|---|---|---|
| Loxbeare | Devon | 50.93°N 03.55°W | SS9116 |
| Loxford | Redbridge | 51.54°N 00.07°E | TQ4485 |
| Loxhill | Surrey | 51.13°N 00.57°W | TQ0038 |
| Loxhore | Devon | 51.12°N 03.98°W | SS6138 |
| Loxhore Cott | Devon | 51.12°N 03.98°W | SS6138 |
| Loxley | Sheffield | 53.39°N 01.55°W | SK3089 |
| Loxley | Warwickshire | 52.16°N 01.63°W | SP2552 |
| Loxley Green | Staffordshire | 52.86°N 01.91°W | SK0630 |
| Loxter | Herefordshire | 52.05°N 02.42°W | SO7140 |
| Loxton | Somerset | 51.29°N 02.90°W | ST3755 |
| Loxwood | West Sussex | 51.06°N 00.53°W | TQ0331 |
| Loyter's Green | Essex | 51.76°N 00.18°E | TL5110 |
| Loyterton | Kent | 51.30°N 00.79°E | TQ9560 |
| Lozells | Birmingham | 52.49°N 01.91°W | SP0689 |
