= Lowertown =

Lowertown may refer to:

== Places ==
=== Canada ===
- an alternative spelling of Lower Town, Ottawa, Ontario, Canada

=== United Kingdom ===
- Lowertown, County Tyrone, a townland in Killyman, Northern Ireland
- Lowertown, Devon, a settlement in the UK, England
- Lowertown, Luxulyan, Cornwall
- Lowertown, Orkney, a place in Orkney, Scotland, Scotland
- Lowertown or Lowertown-by-Helston, Cornwall

=== Republic of Ireland ===
- Lowertown, a townland in the civil parish of Clones, County Monaghan
- Lowertown, County Westmeath, a townland in the civil parish of Rahugh, barony of Moycashel

=== United States ===
- Lowertown Historic District (Lockport, New York), a district of Niagara County
- Lowertown Historic District (Saint Paul, Minnesota), a neighborhood and historic district

== Other ==
- Lowertown (band), an American indie rock band

== See also ==
- Lowertown Historic District (disambiguation)
- Lower Town (disambiguation)
