= Lower Town (disambiguation) =

Lower Town (or Basse-Ville in French), a neighbourhood in Quebec City, Canada

Lower Town may also refer to:

== Canada ==
- Lower Town, a neighbourhood in Ottawa

== Croatia ==
- Donji grad, Zagreb, a historic neighbourhood in Zagreb

== Estonia ==
- All-linn, a historic neighbourhood of Tallinn, Estonia

== United Kingdom ==
- Lower Town, Devon, a settlement in the UK, England
- Lower Town, Herefordshire, a settlement in Herefordshire, England
- Lower Town, Isles of Scilly, Cornwall
- Lower Town, Pembrokeshire, a settlement in the UK, Wales
- Lower Town, West Yorkshire, England, an area of Oxenhope
- Lower Town, Worcestershire, England

== United States ==
- Lower Town, California
- A historic Cheroke settlement in northeast Georgia and western South Carolina; see Historic Cherokee settlements § Lower / Keowee settlements
- The lower towns of the Chickamauga Cherokee in northwest Georgia and northeast Alabama

== See also ==
- Lowertown (disambiguation)
