= Gwavas, Helston =

Hamlet in Cornwall, England

Coordinates: 50.117°N 5.283°W

Gwavas: Cornish: Gwavos
- Hamlet
- Location within Cornwall
- Unitary authority: Cornwall
- Region: South West
- Country: England
- Sovereign state: United Kingdom
- Police: Devon and Cornwall
- Fire: Cornwall
- Ambulance: South Western

Gwavas (Cornish: Gwavos, meaning winter dwelling) is a hamlet in the parish of Sithney, Cornwall, United Kingdom. Gwavas is adjoining Lowertown-by-Helston. The hamlet is a rural farming hamlet which once had a shop. Gwavas is 1.5 miles (2.4 km) northwest of Helston.

The hamlet is notable for a German plane crash during World War II, when a farmer here heard a loud noise and went out to find a plane crashed into his field. His wife made the German men cups of tea, while the farmer went in and cleaned the men's clothes and whistle.
