= Lowertown Historic District =

Lowertown Historic District can refer to:

- Lowertown Historic District (Lockport, New York)
- Lowertown Historic District (St. Paul, Minnesota)
