= Molesey Heath =

Nature reserve in Molesey, Surrey, England

Coordinates: 51.392°N 0.374°W

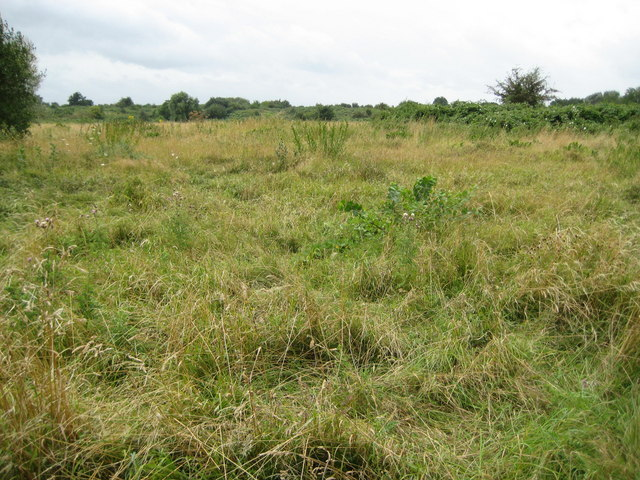
- Interactive map of Molesey Heath
- Type: Local Nature Reserve
- Location: Molesey, Surrey
- OS grid: TQ 132 671
- Area: 17.8 hectares (44 acres)
- Manager: Elmbridge Borough Council

Molesey Heath is a 17.8-hectare (44-acre) Local Nature Reserve in Molesey in Surrey. It is owned and managed by Elmbridge Borough Council.

This site was formerly a gravel pit and then a landfill site. It has been colonised naturally by rough grassland and scrub. Fauna include burrowing bees, wasps and diverse bird species such as little ringed plovers and redshanks.

There is access from Approach Road. The heath can also be accessed on foot via the Walton and Weybridge Footpath and Bridleway from Lower Green, Esher.
