= Lower Amble =

Hamlet in Cornwall, England

Coordinates: 50.539°N 4.839°W

- Location within Cornwall
- OS grid reference: SW989749
- Civil parish: St Kew
- Unitary authority: Cornwall
- Ceremonial county: Cornwall
- Region: South West
- Country: England
- Sovereign state: United Kingdom
- Post town: Wadebridge
- Postcode district: PL27

Lower Amble is a hamlet in the civil parish of St Kew (where the population at the 2011 census was included), Cornwall, England, UK. Lower Amble is approximately 1 mile (1.6 km) north of Wadebridge.
