= Lower Mill, Cornwall =

Hamlet in Cornwall, England

Coordinates: 50.212°N 4.943°W

Lower Mill
- Location within Cornwall
- OS grid reference: SW901388
- Civil parish: Veryan
- Unitary authority: Cornwall
- Ceremonial county: Cornwall
- Region: South West
- Country: England
- Sovereign state: United Kingdom
- Post town: Truro
- Postcode district: TR2

Lower Mill is a hamlet in the parish of Veryan, Cornwall, England, UK. Lower Mill is approximately 5 miles (8.0 km) south-east of Truro.
