= Lower Trebullett =

Hamlet in Cornwall, England

Coordinates: 50°34′17″N 4°22′21″W

Lower Trebullett is a hamlet, or a small settlement, in the parish of Lezant, Cornwall, England.
