= Lower Padworth =

Coordinates: 51.404558°N 1.132775°W

- Location within Berkshire
- OS grid reference: SP607679
- Metropolitan borough: West Berkshire
- Metropolitan county: Berkshire
- Region: South East
- Country: England
- Sovereign state: United Kingdom
- Post town: READING
- Postcode district: RG7
- Dialling code: 0118
- Police: Thames Valley
- Fire: Royal Berkshire
- Ambulance: South Central
- UK Parliament: Berkshire

Lower Padworth is a village in Berkshire, and part of the civil parishes of Padworth, Aldermaston and Beenham. According to the Post Office at the 2011 Census the majority of the population was included in the civil parish of Padworth.

The settlement lies on the A4 road, and is located near to Aldermaston railway station.
