= Lower Woon =

Hamlet in Cornwall, England

Coordinates: 50.435°N 4.766°W

- Location within Cornwall
- OS grid reference: SX037631
- Civil parish: Luxulyan
- Unitary authority: Cornwall
- Ceremonial county: Cornwall
- Region: South West
- Country: England
- Sovereign state: United Kingdom
- Post town: Bodmin
- Postcode district: PL30

Lower Woon is a hamlet in the civil parish of Luxulyan (where the 2011 census population was included) in Cornwall, England, UK. It is approximately 0.5 miles (0.80 km) south of Lanivet and 6 miles (9.7 km) north of St Austell.
