= Lower Auchenreath =

Coordinates: 57°39′25″N 3°2′56″W

The Pig farm at Lower Auchenreath

Lower Auchenreath is a tiny rural settlement situated in the North East Coast of Scotland. It is home to a mixed arable/animal farm and is only a mile to the West of Port Gordon. Nearby is the Speyside walk and Spey Bay Golf Club. Originally there were several small crofts which over the years have been amalgamated into a single farm. There are 9 dwellings at Lower Auchenreath. The Tynet burn flows through the farm, which was the old boundary between Morayshire and Banffshire. The dwellings are all situated on the Morayshire (west) side of the Tynet burn but some of the fields are on the Banffshire side. The settlement is bordered on the West side by the old Dallachy aerodrome, which was used in World War 2, but has long since been disused.

There is evidence of a prehistoric settlement at Lower Auchenreath, with cropmarks visible from the air of ring ditches and a barrow.
