= Bordean =

Hamlet in Hampshire, England

Coordinates: 51.01757°N 1.01605°W

- Location within Hampshire
- OS grid reference: SU691247
- Civil parish: Langrish
- District: East Hampshire
- Shire county: Hampshire
- Region: South East
- Country: England
- Sovereign state: United Kingdom
- Post town: Petersfield
- Postcode district: GU32
- Police: Hampshire and Isle of Wight
- Fire: Hampshire and Isle of Wight
- Ambulance: South Central
- UK Parliament: East Hampshire

Bordean is a hamlet in the East Hampshire district of Hampshire, England. It is in the civil parish of Langrish. It is 2 miles (3.2 km) northeast of the village of East Meon and 3.5 miles (5.6 km) west of Petersfield, on the A272 road.

Bordean House is a late 17th century Grade II Listed mansion situated between the hamlet and Langrish.

The nearest railway station is Petersfield, 3.2 miles (5.2 km) east of the hamlet.
