= Lower Green, Esher =

Area of Esher, Surrey, England

Coordinates: 51.378°N 0.369°W

Lower Green
- Location within Surrey
- OS grid reference: TQ136656
  - Charing Cross: 13 mi (21 km) NE
- District: Elmbridge
- Shire county: Surrey
- Region: South East
- Country: England
- Sovereign state: United Kingdom
- Post town: Esher
- Postcode district: KT10
- Dialling code: 020
- Police: Surrey
- Fire: Surrey
- Ambulance: South East Coast
- UK Parliament: Esher and Walton

Lower Green is a suburban residential and commercial area within Esher, in Surrey, England, on the banks of the River Ember and River Mole. The area has many businesses, most of them in the commercial complex comprising Sandown Industrial Complex and Royal Mills.

For electoral purposes, Lower Green is divided into two wards: Hinchley Wood & Weston Green, and Esher.

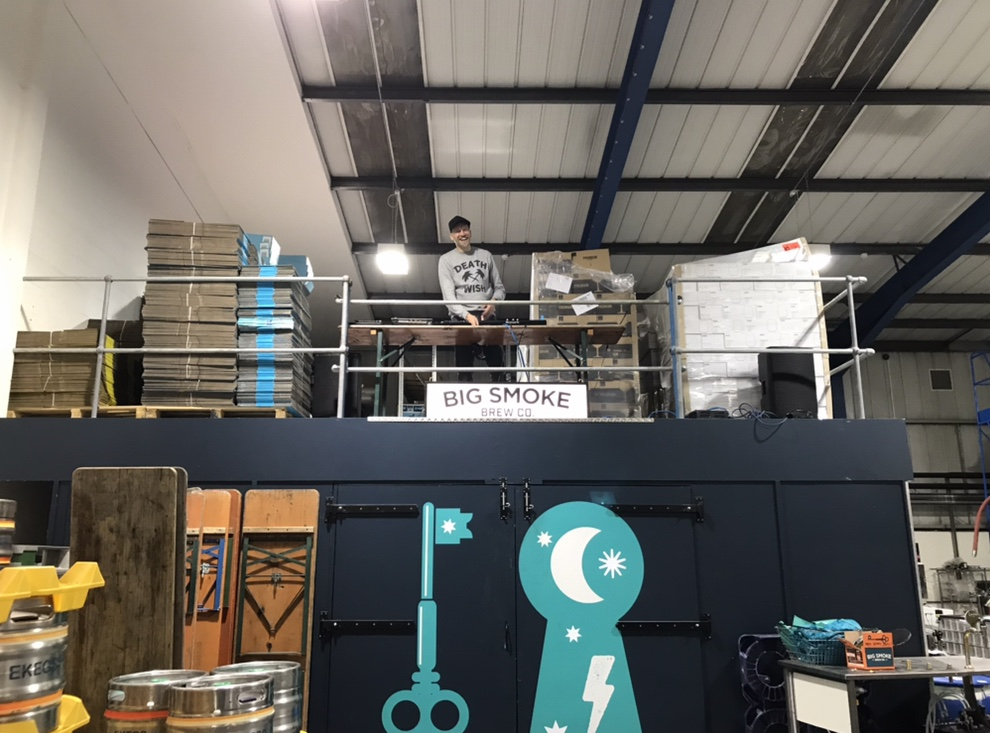
DJ at The Big Smoke Brewery

== History ==
=== The Royal Mills ===
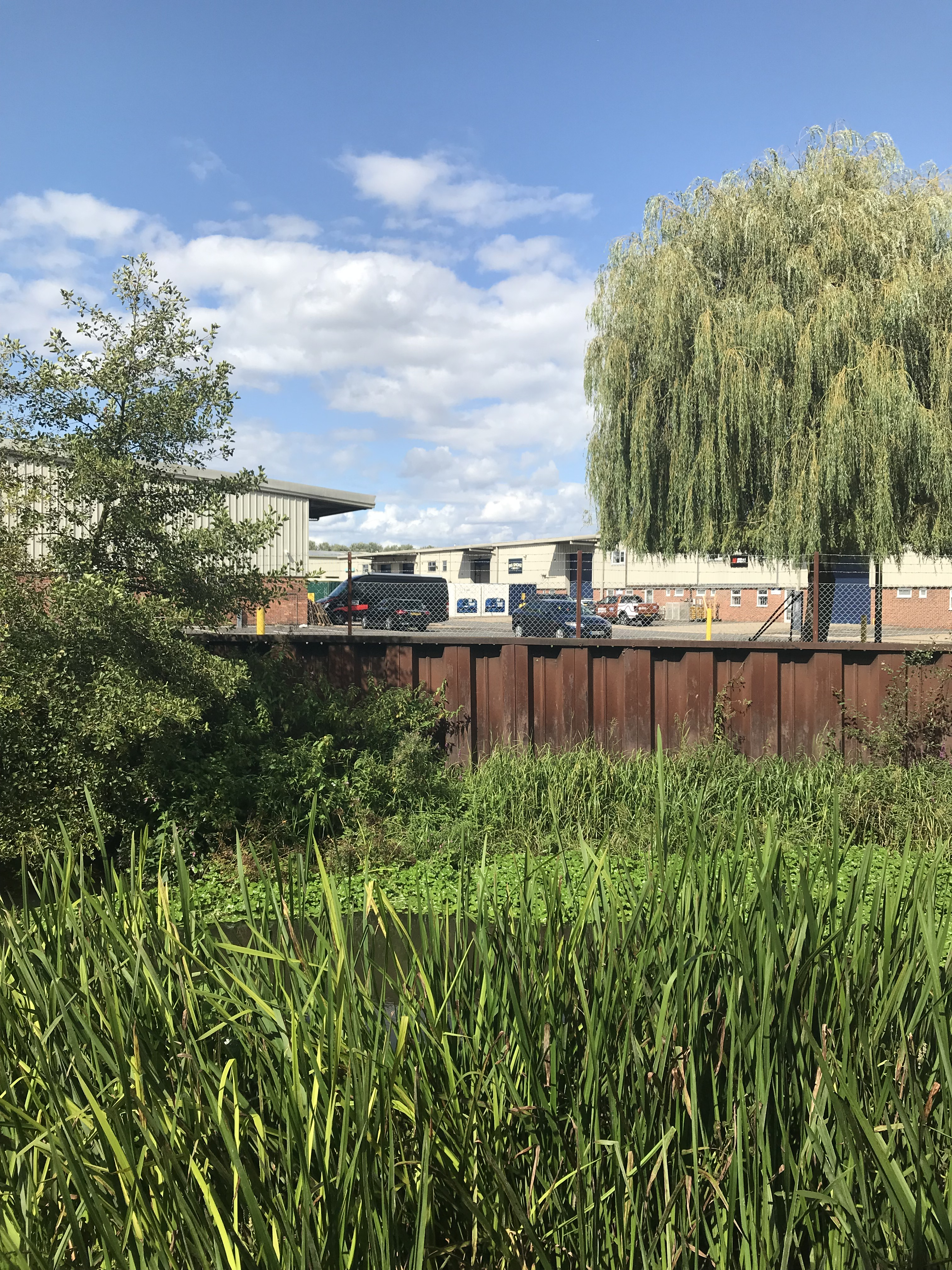
Site of The Royal Mills in Lower Green

The mills were located on the bank of the River Mole and were one of many such mills along the river, as many as 20 were recorded in Domesday Book. The Esher Mills were mentioned in the court rolls of King John of England where a payment from Roger the Miller for an annual sum of 12 broches of eels was recorded in 1199. The mill was originally used for corn milling.

Industrial activity was recorded in the 17th century when a copper wire mill was established in 1649 by two Dutch settlers, Mommer and Demetrus, who acquired the mill. The mill was later purchased by Dockwra's Copper Mill and copper and brass wire were produced until c.1800. Under the ownership of Lord Hotham it became a paper mill, and it is assumed the title 'Royal' came from the production of either banknotes or paper in 'royal' sizes. Later the mill became a linoleum factory until it was burnt down in 1897. In 1902 the mill was acquired and rebuilt by the bookbinders James Burn & Co Ltd, who installed a steam engine. The site was the scene of another fire in 1908, however the company survived and became renowned for spiral binding. In 1939 a hangar was built for Vickers as part of the wartime dispersal of work where the hangar was used for aircraft parts. The hangar was later used by the council from 1969 to 1988. In 1968 salvage work was carried out on the Royal Mills due to heavy flooding that year.

=== Housing ===
Small cottages have been seen in Lower Green from maps dating back as far as 1871, with the slow extension of housing emanating west from the Royal Mill. The 1923 Housing Act saw the completion of some council cottages, provisioning of such housing was suspended in 1939 and was restarted in 1949. It was not until the 1950s that the density of housing increased drastically with the building of the houses to the west towards Thames Ditton. Wolsey Grange, the home of the solicitor and church warden Robert Hamilton Few, no longer exists but was prominent on early maps of the area.

Housing Types Found in Lower Green
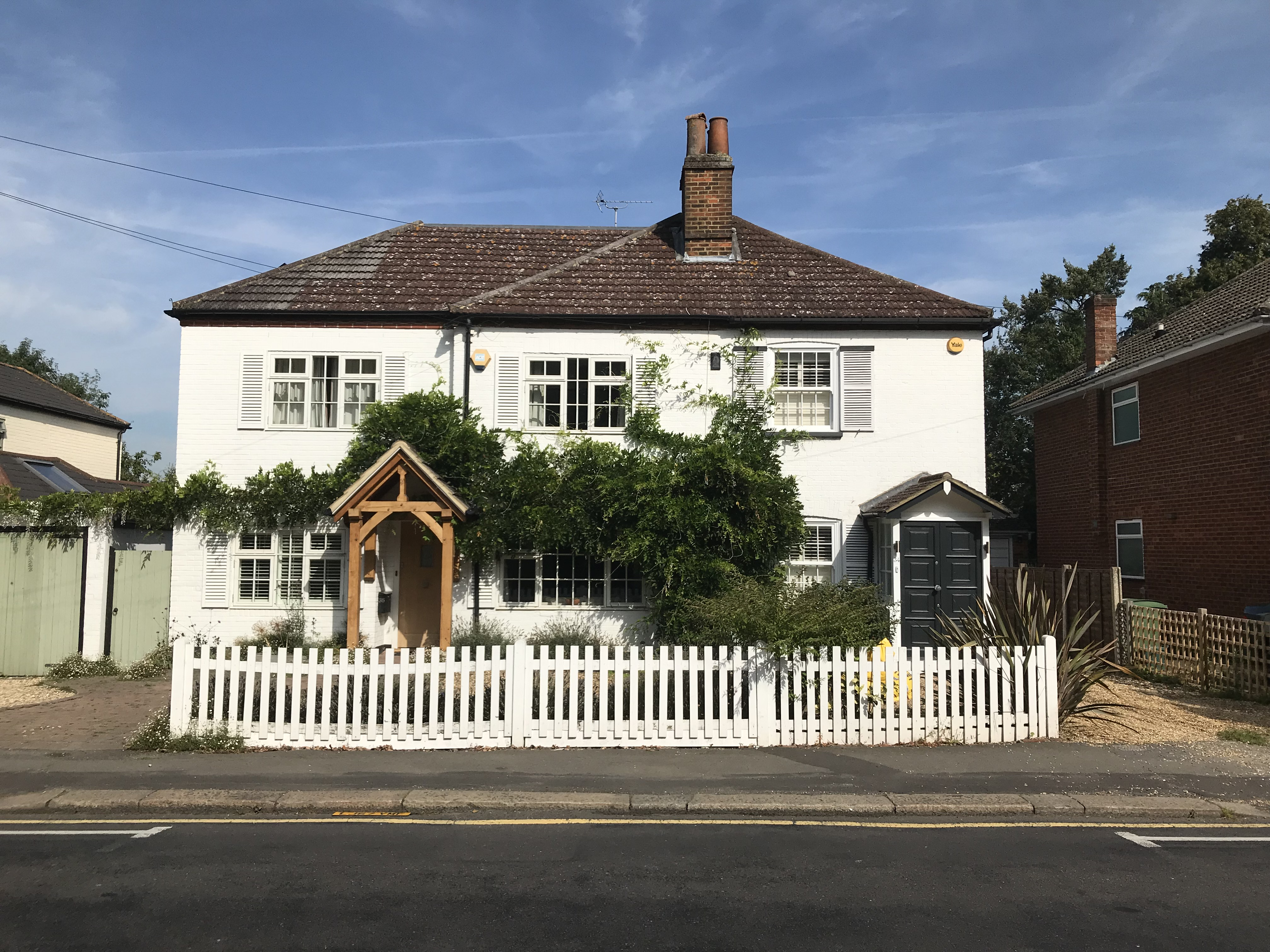
Semi-detached house

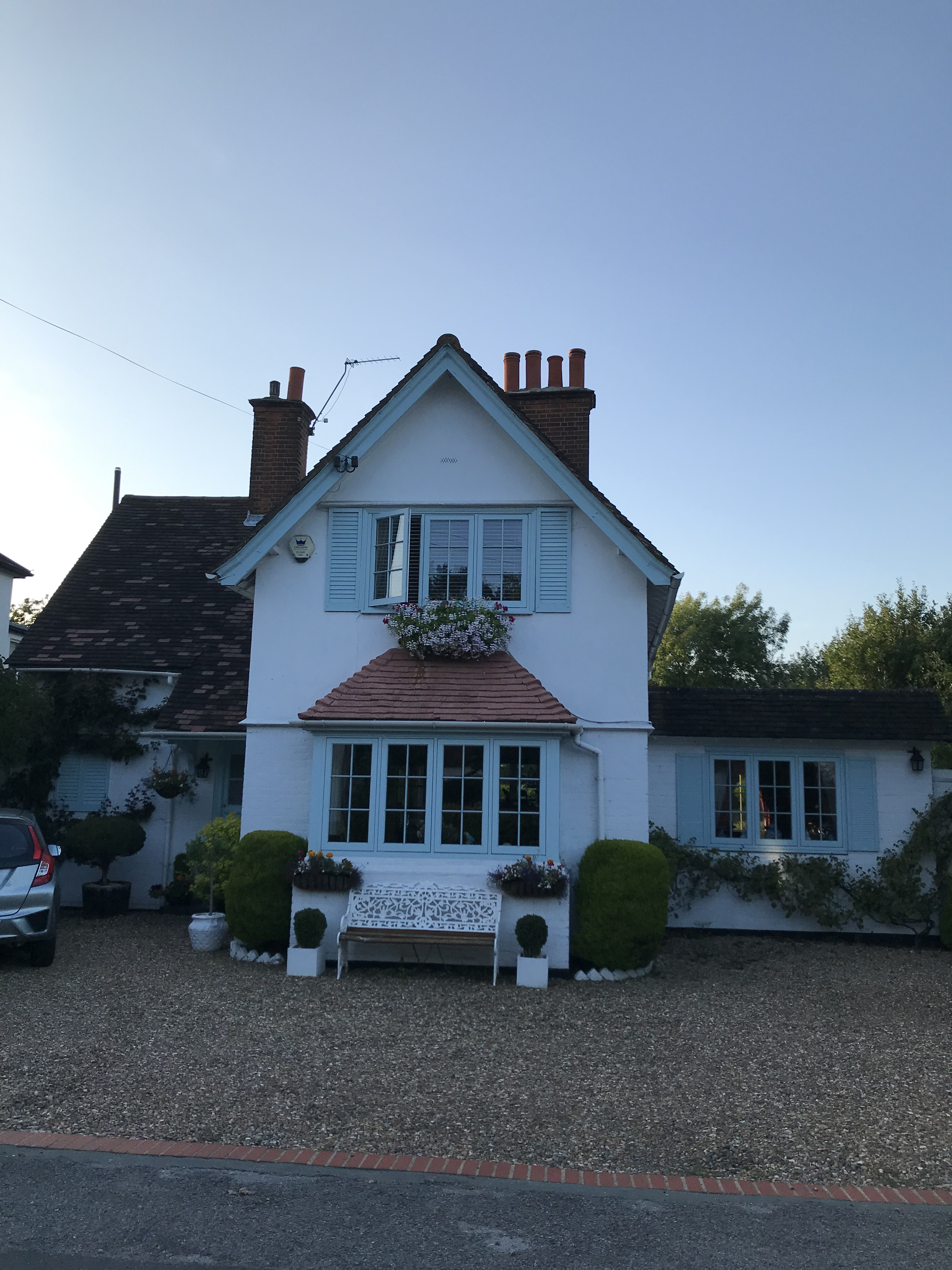
Detached house

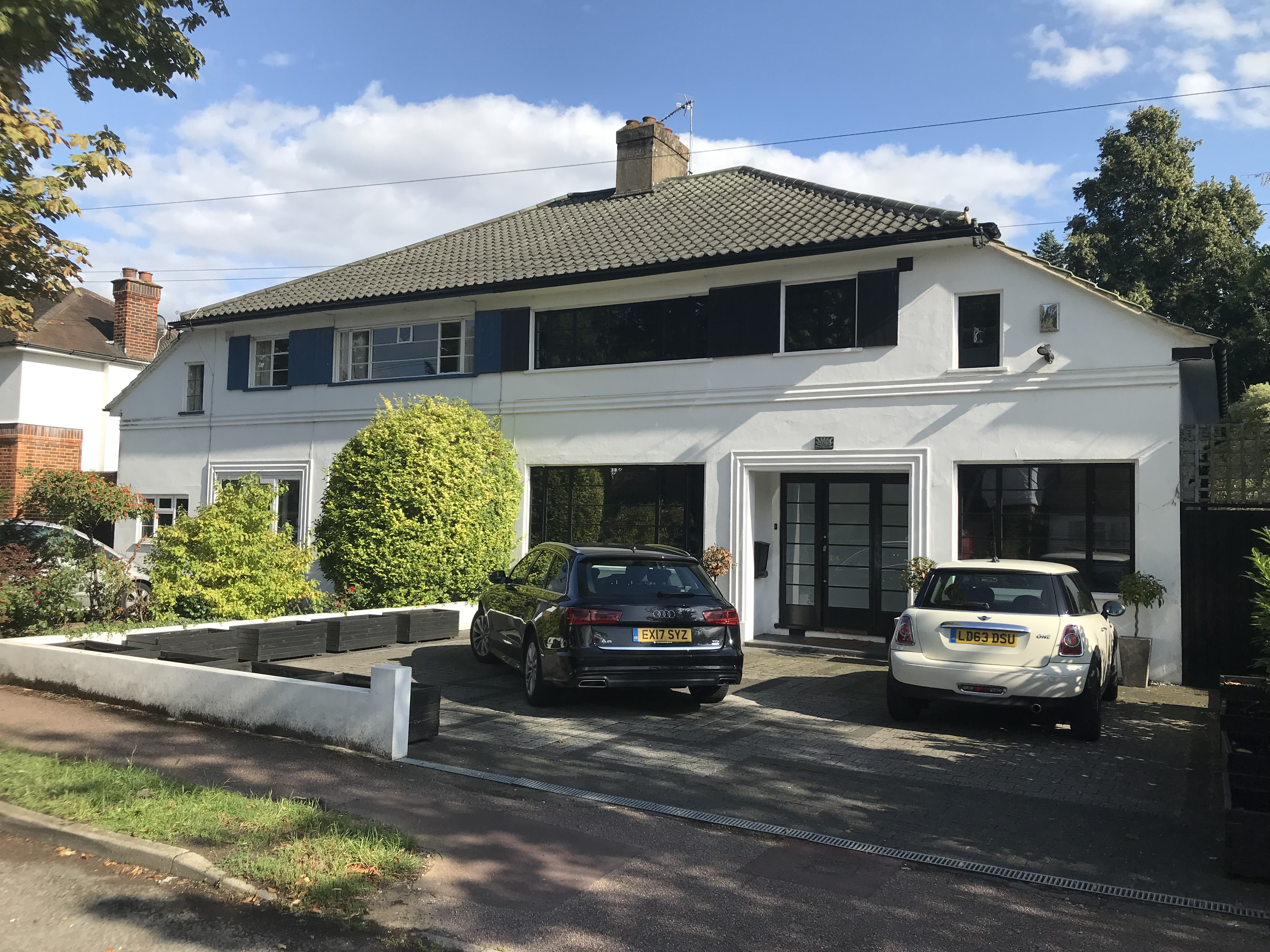
Art Deco house

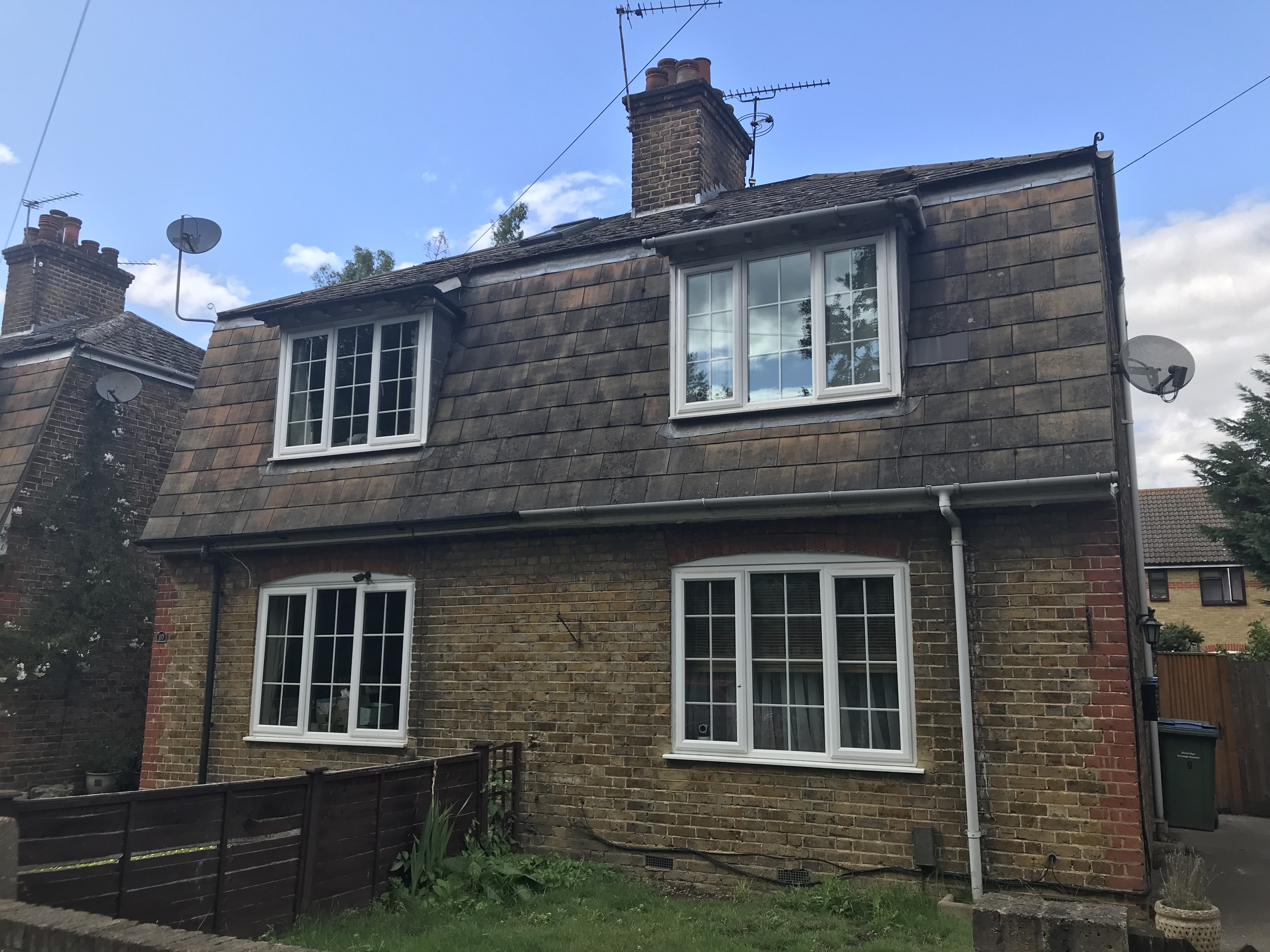
Cottages built by Esher Urban District Council (UDC)

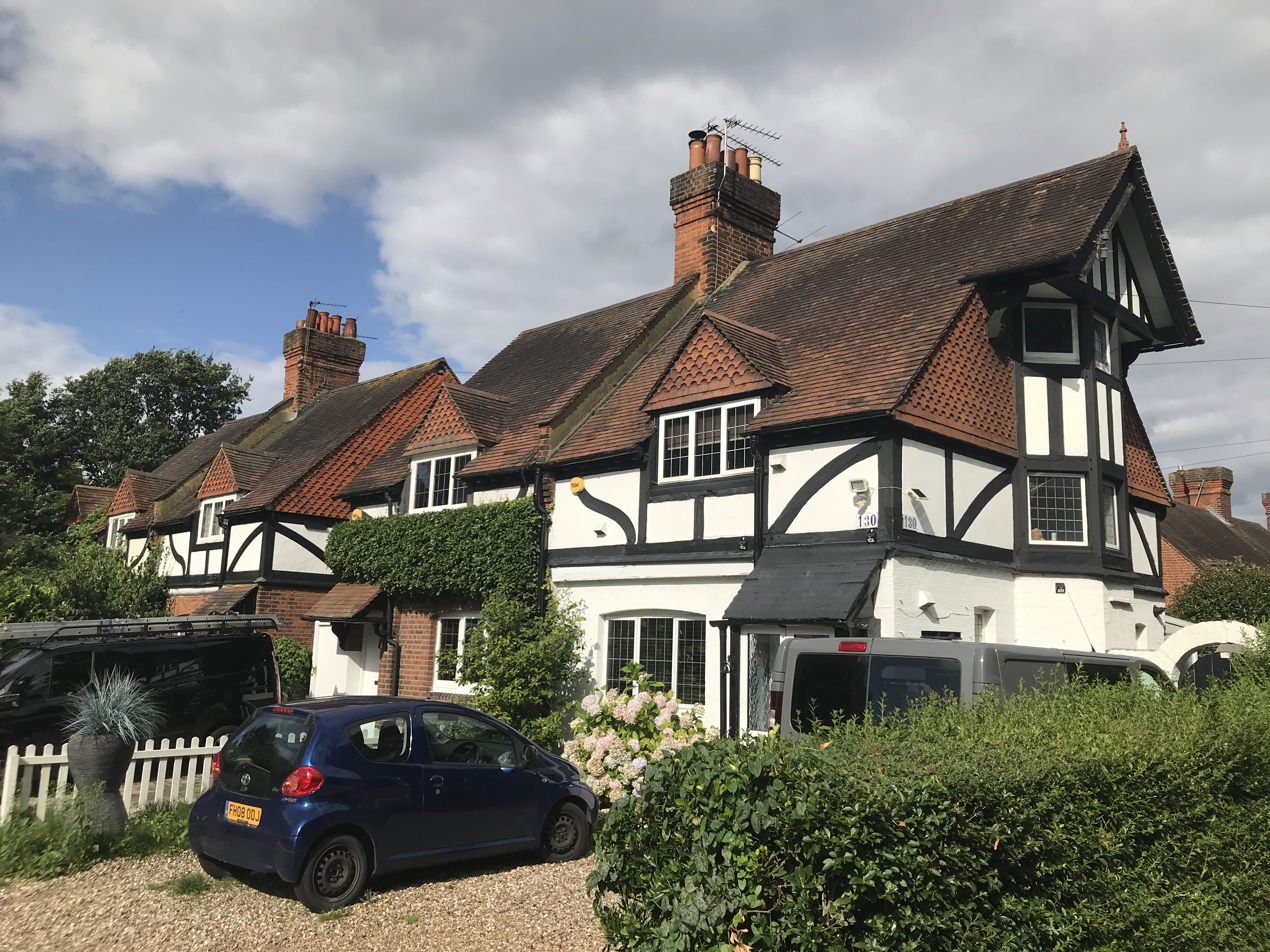
Mock Tudor building

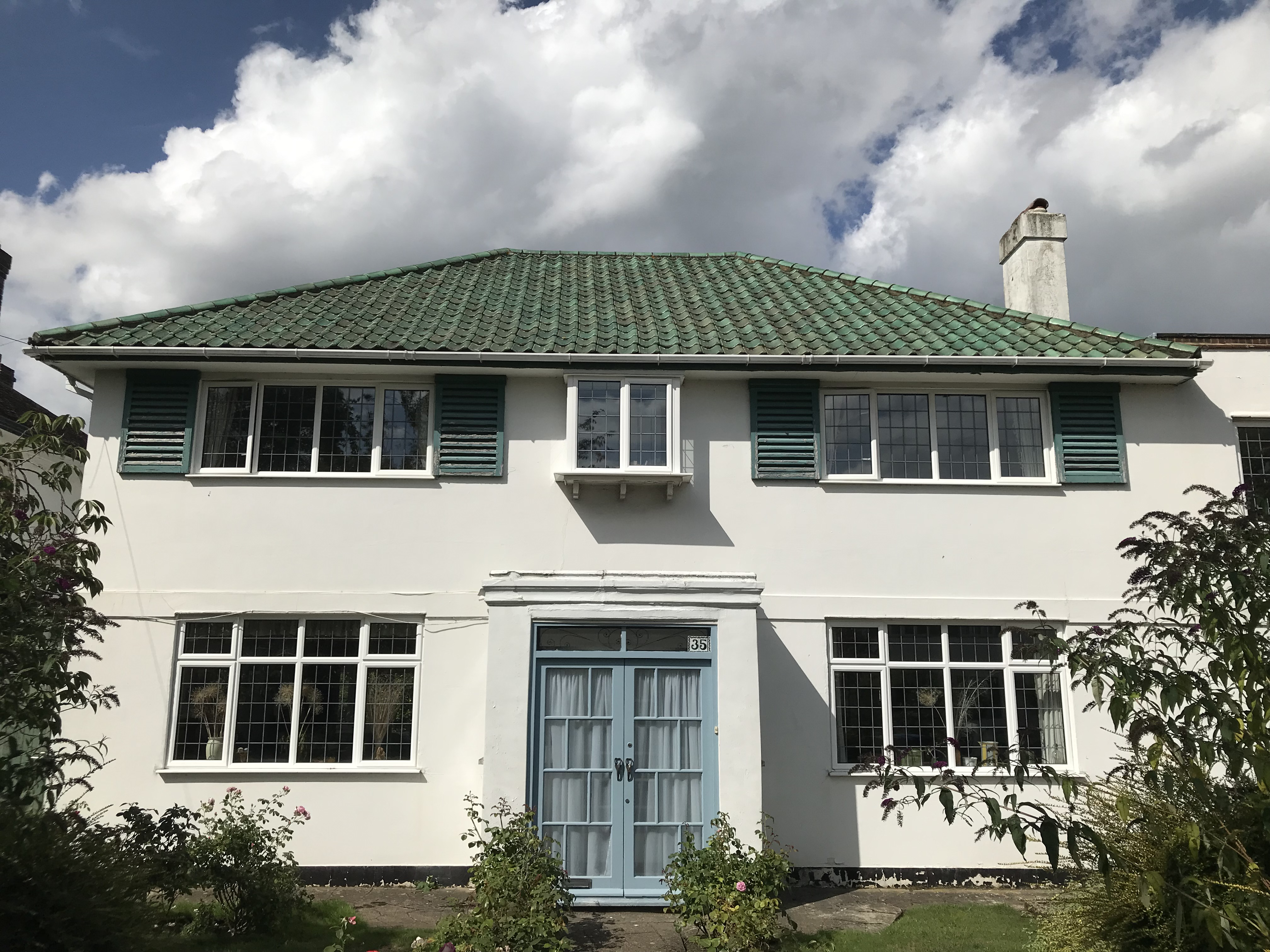
Green roof tiles

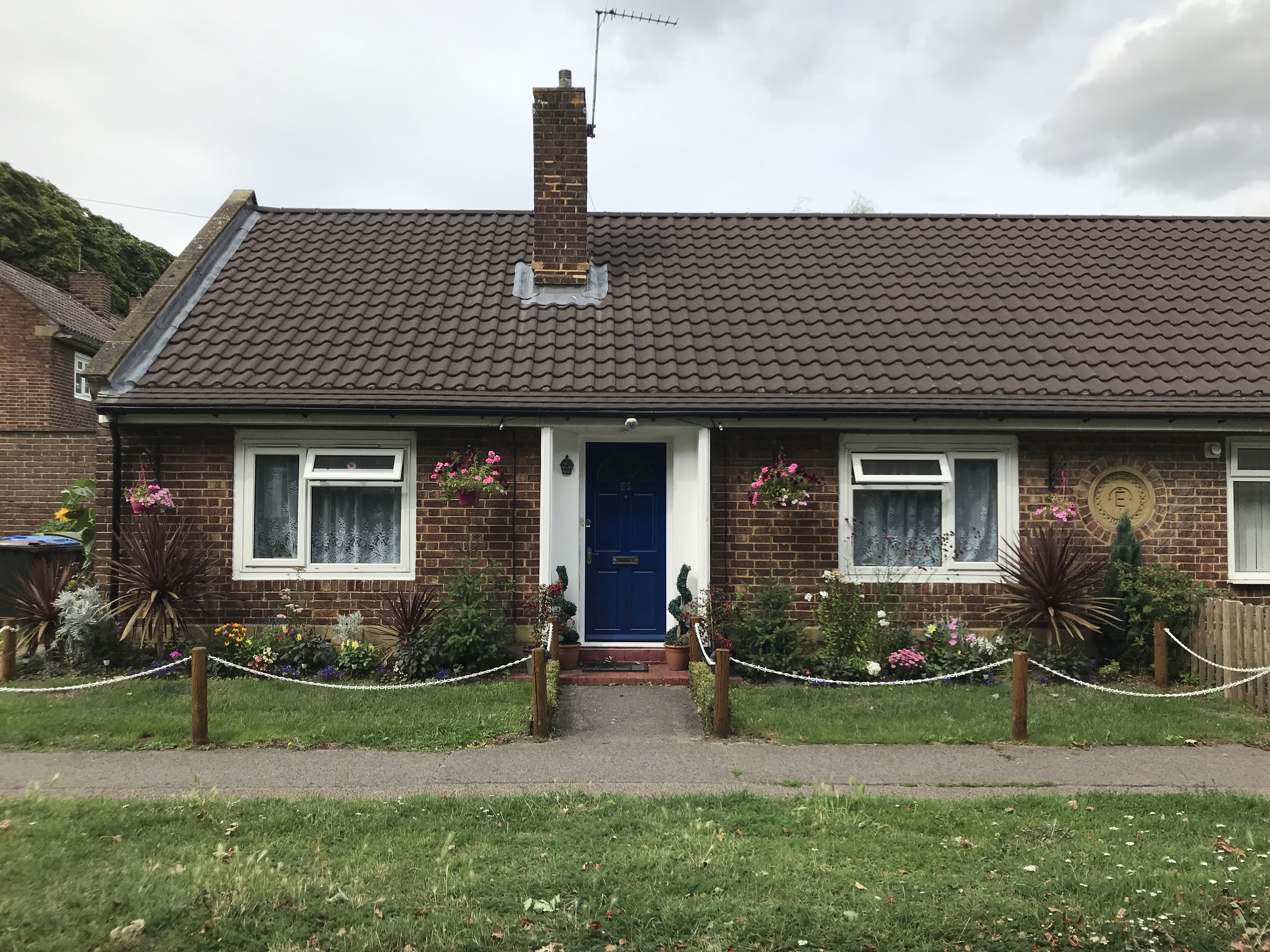
Bungalow

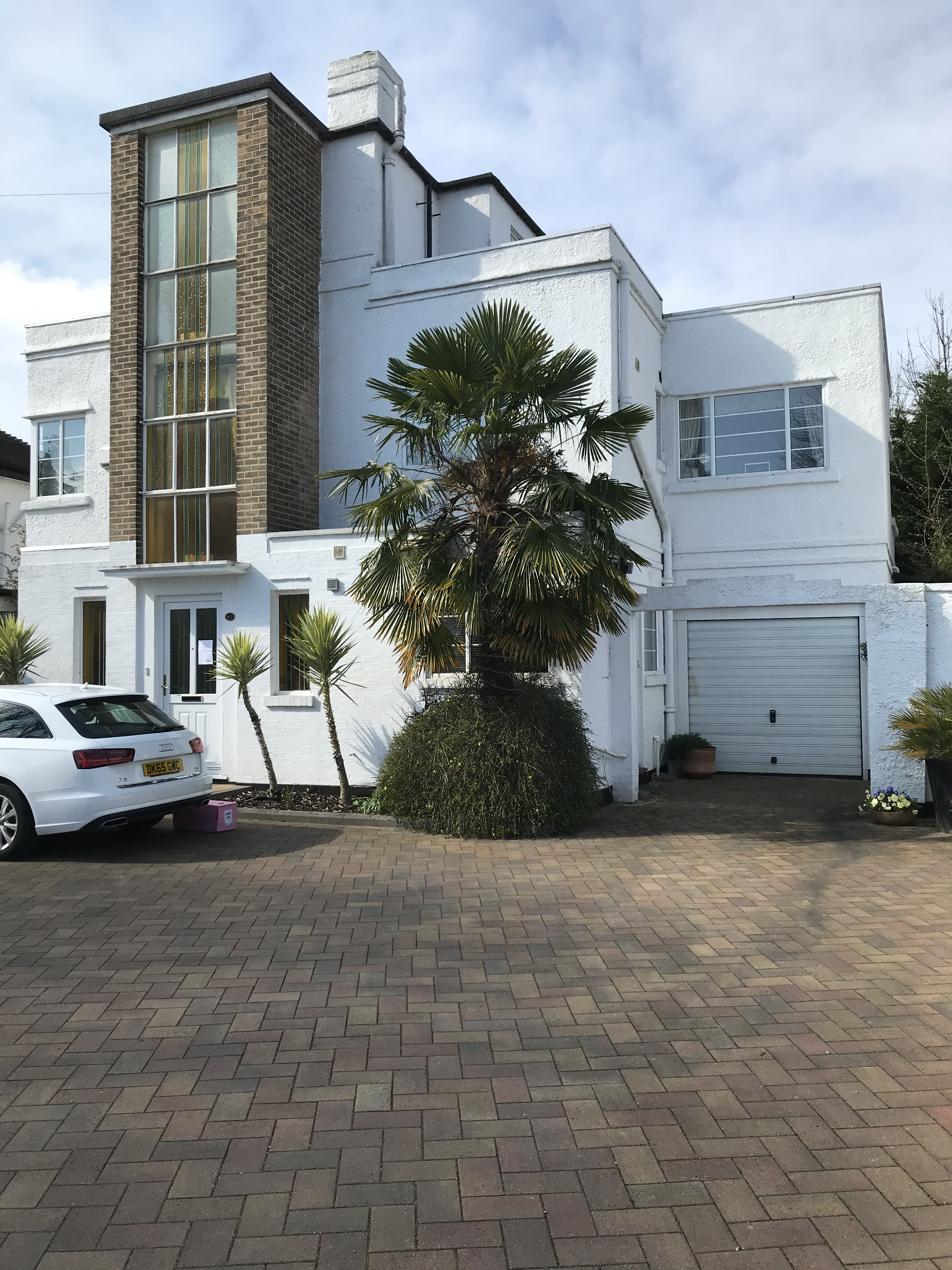
Modernist building

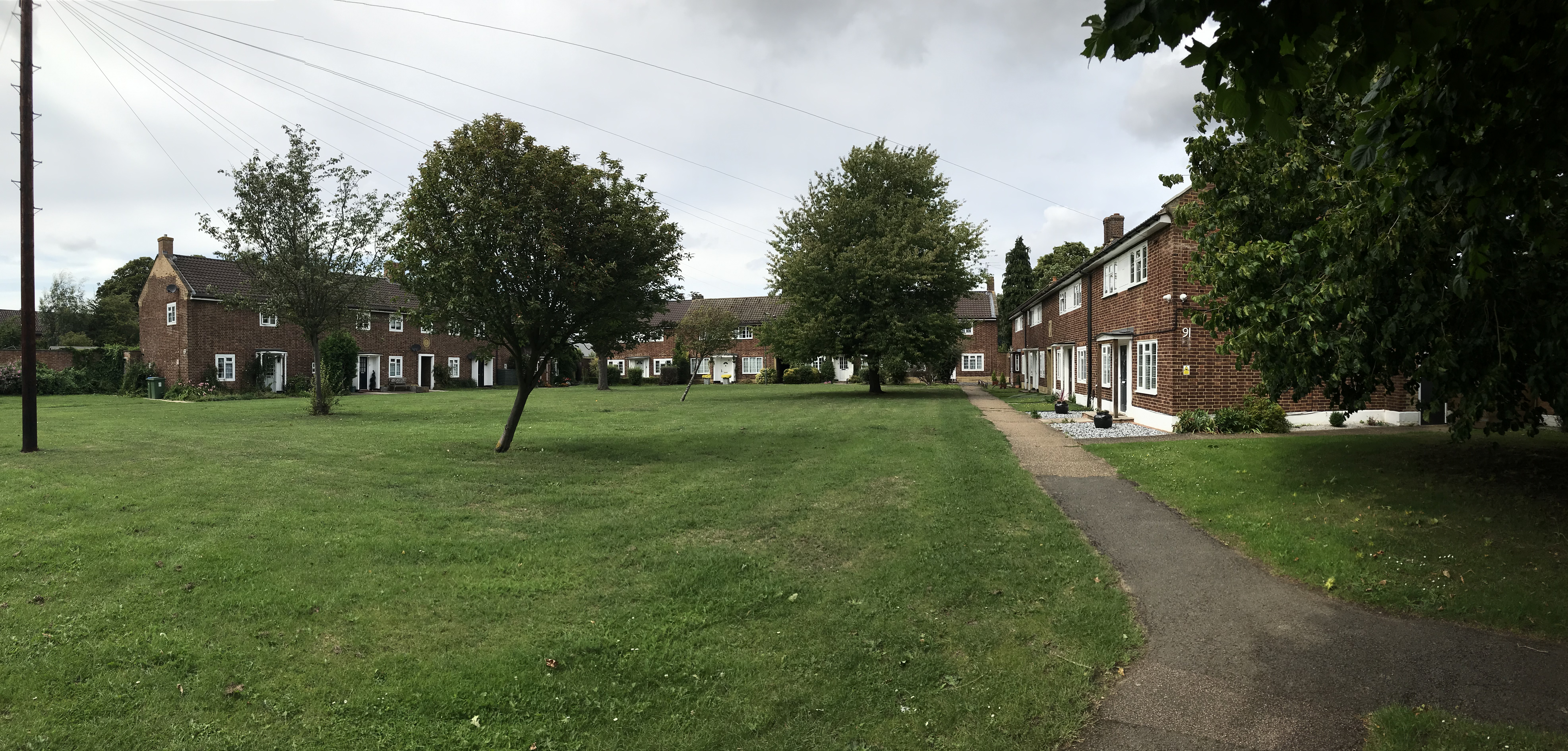
UDC houses with green space

=== Sandown Park ===
Built in the 1870s with land acquired from J W Spicer of Esher Place, Sandown Park's first meeting was held in 1875.

=== Esher Place Gate House ===
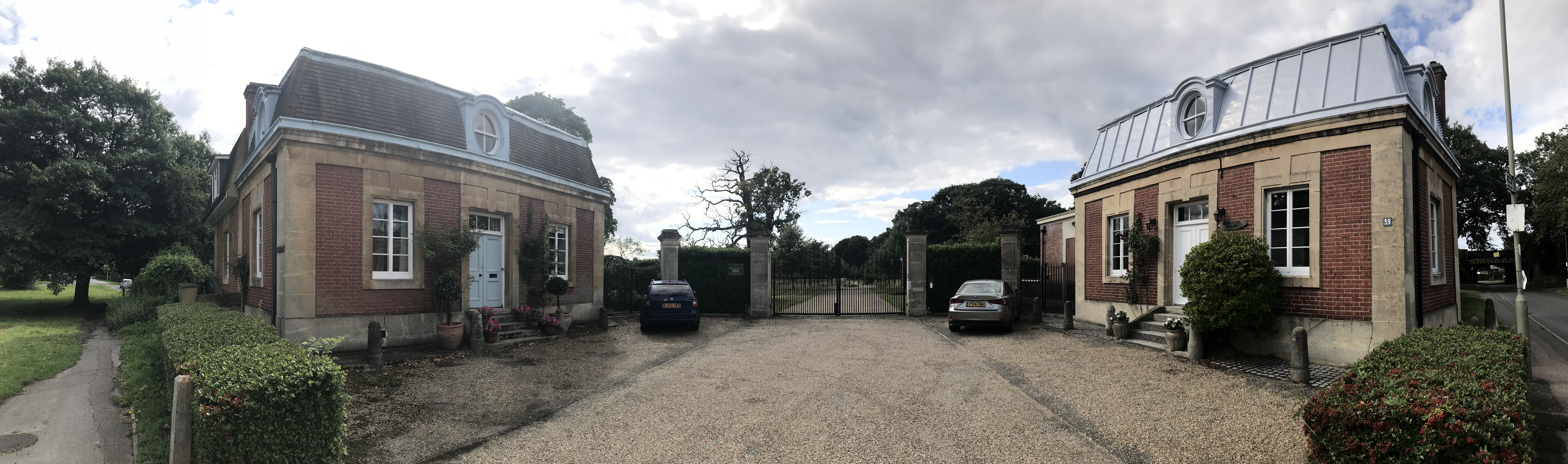
Esher Place Gate

In 1929 the Esher Place estate was broken up and sold, part of this included The Gate House which was acquired by Shaftesbury Home for Girls. The Gate House is now private residences.

=== Railway ===
In 1838 a line was proposed from Nine Elms to Woking and in the same year a station was opened in Surbiton. London and South Western Railway bought land in Lower Green to circumnavigate Esher town and Ditton Marsh station, now Esher station, was opened in 1846. The station had an exclusive waiting room for the Duchess of Albany for race-day attendances.

=== Coal Tax Post ===
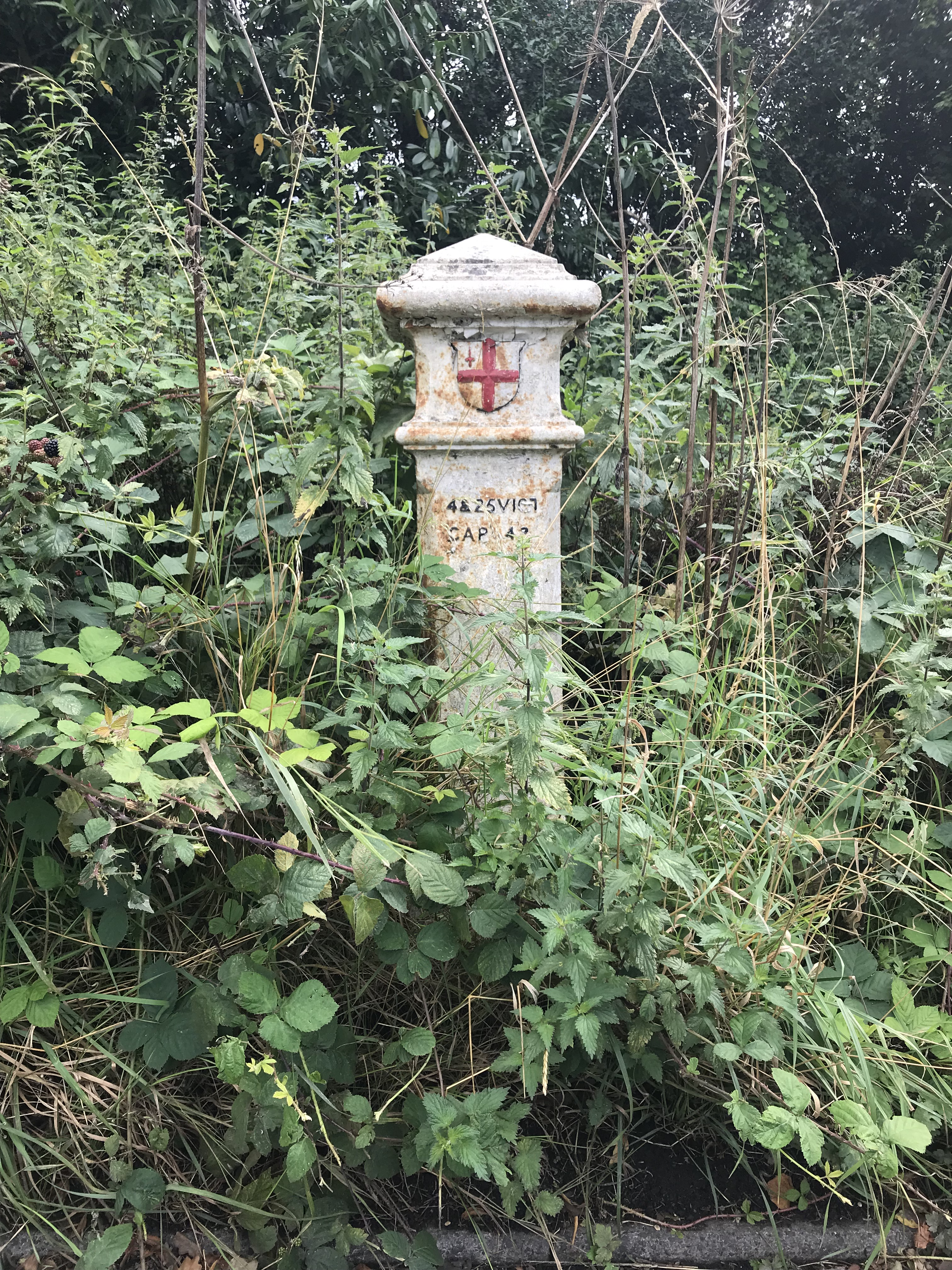
Coal Tax Post

Originally set up to pay for the Great fire in 1666 the coal tax posts were established around London to pay for improvements, two of which can be found in Lower Green. One is located on Lower Green Road, TQ 138 657, and the other on Douglas Road, TQ 140 685, was moved in 1861.

=== Maps ===
A history of Lower Green can also be seen through the rich cartography of the area. Lower Green can be identified as far back as John Rocque's 1762 map, where the map identifies the Esher Wire Mill on the banks of the River Mole and River Ember. Lower Green Road is also on the map with agricultural land to the north. By 1871 The Six-inch England and Wales Ordnance Survey Maps identify the addition of the London and South Western Railway and Lower Green is clearly marked on the map. The map also identifies the Mill Cottages, The Old Papermills, Papermills Road (now Mill Road), a Boat House, City Post, Wolsey Grange, a Wells, The Grove and Pound Farm.

In the 1896 Ordnance Survey (OS) map Island Barn can be seen but it was not until 1897 that the water treatment facility becomes visible and much later the reservoir. The maps show that the mill's name changed from Old Paper Mill to Royal Mills and Paper Mill Road changed to Mill Lane. The map also identifies the addition of Mill Mead and several new buildings and detailed views of The Grove and Wolsey Grange.

In 1899 the Railway Clearing House map shows the addition of Sandown racecourse and the station which was at the time named Claremont and Esher - the station had many names over the years. In a map containing Sandown Farm from 1804 you are able to see the topography before the racetrack was built. By 1913 in the OS map Royal Mills becomes Royal Mills Bookbinding and a short stretch of Douglas Road with houses on the south can be seen. There are some new houses on what is now Farm Road and a row of now non-existent Mill Cottages in the Royal Mill Ait, between the Ember and Mole rivers, with additional cottages to the east of Mill Lane.

By 1920 houses can be seen on the east end of Lower Green Road. John Bartholomew & Co.'s 1922 map shows Lower Green cut by the district zoning. By 1934 Farm Road is established and houses are built on the north side of Douglas Road, with 1939 seeing the addition of yet more houses on Farm Road and the completion of the Island Barn Reservoir.

It is not until 1956 in the TQ16 map that you can see the densely populated area in the east of Lower Green which is connected by the extension of Douglas Road into the Woodlands, the addition of the properties built by Esher District Council can also be seen. In 1960 the Lower Green area is shown to include Esher Place and Waynflete Tower.

== Locality ==
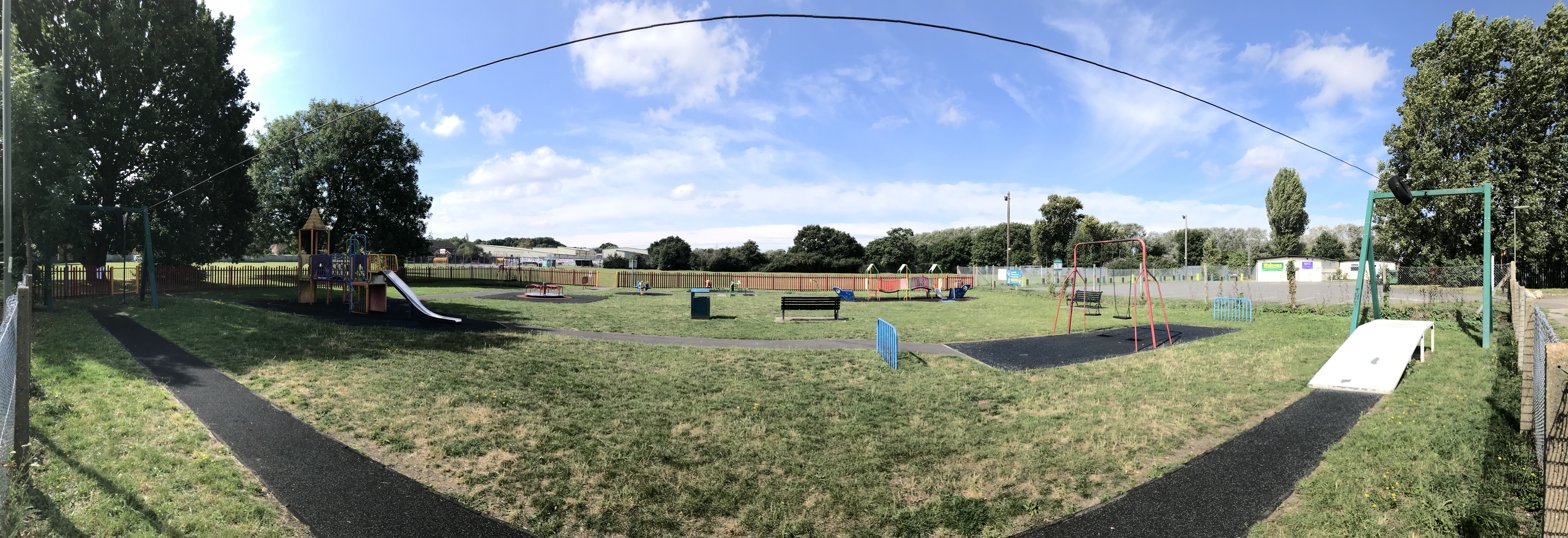
Lower Green Recreation Ground

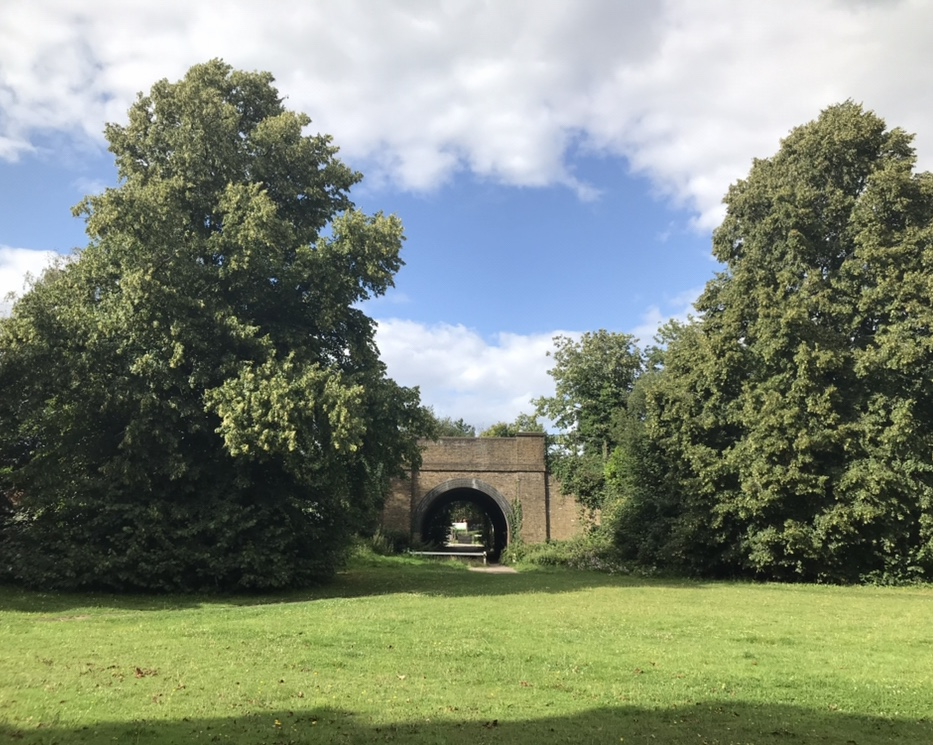
Cobb Green

=== Landmarks ===
- The Old Cottage, Grade II listed building
- Esher Place Gate House
- Coal Tax Post
- Sandown Racecourse

=== Amenities ===
Lower End has no high street, but there is a cafe, corner shop and brewery that has a tap room open to the public.

There is a retail restaurant-lined street (A307 High Street) to the south-west, which is a 10-minute walk.

- Esher Railway station
- Corner store, formerly called Denhams
- Brewery open to the public
- Lower Green Community Center
- Farm Road Recreation Ground
- Emberside Recreation Ground
- Ember sports club
- Byways and bridle ways along the River Mole to Molesey Heath

== Notable residents ==
- John Cobb (1899–1952), racing motorist, three times holder of the world land speed record – born at Esher
