= Lowes Barn =

Suburb of Durham, England

Coordinates: 54.765°N 1.593°W

Lowes Barn or Lowe's Barn is a suburb of the city of Durham in County Durham, England. It lies to the south-west of Durham and is linked with Neville's Cross.
