= Lower Mickletown =

Village in West Yorkshire, England

Coordinates: 53.7391°N 1.3825°W

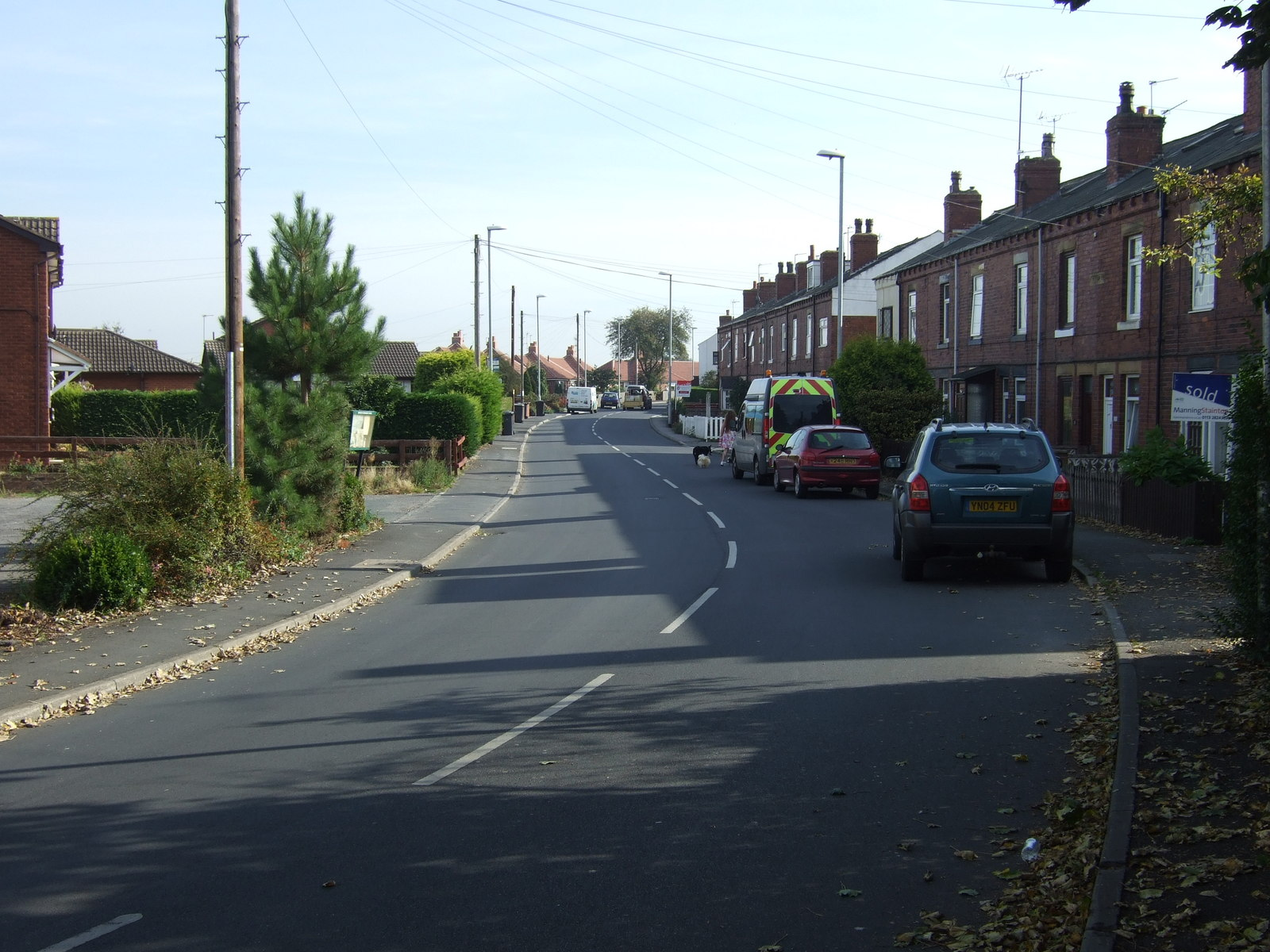
Looking east along the main street

Lower Mickletown is a hamlet in the City of Leeds, in the English county of West Yorkshire. It was named Low Mickletown in the early 20th century and has been known under this name at least until about 1950.

Lower Mickletown is served by Arriva Yorkshire buses running between Leeds and Wakefield.
