= Lower Menadue =

Hamlet in Cornwall, England

Coordinates: 50.401°N 4.762°W

Lower Menadue: Cornish: Menedh Du
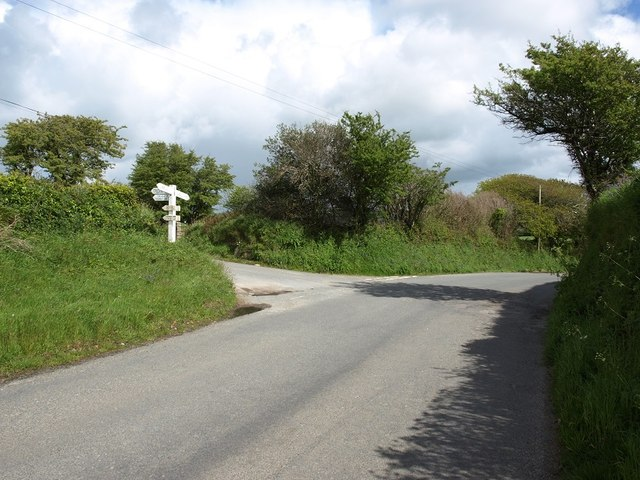

- Location within Cornwall
- OS grid reference: SX038593
- Civil parish: Luxulyan
- Unitary authority: Cornwall
- Ceremonial county: Cornwall
- Region: South West
- Country: England
- Sovereign state: United Kingdom
- Post town: St Austell
- Postcode district: PL26
- UK Parliament: North Cornwall

Lower Menadue (Cornish: Menedh Du, meaning "black hill") is a hamlet in the civil parish of Luxulyan, Cornwall, England. The hamlet is on the minor road from Trewarmett to Trenale, about a mile south-east of Tintagel.
