= Lower Rose =

Hamlet in Cornwall, England

Coordinates: 50.352°N 5.122°W

- Location within Cornwall
- OS grid reference: SW780549
- Civil parish: Perranzabuloe
- Unitary authority: Cornwall
- Ceremonial county: Cornwall
- Region: South West
- Country: England
- Sovereign state: United Kingdom
- Post town: Truro
- Postcode district: TR4

Lower Rose is a hamlet in the parish of Perranzabuloe (where the population at the 2011 census was included.), Cornwall, England, UK. Lower Rose is approximately 6 miles (9.7 km) north of Truro.
