= Lower Woodley =

Hamlet in Cornwall, England

Coordinates: 50.452°N 4.783°W

- Location within Cornwall
- OS grid reference: SX025651
- Civil parish: Lanivet
- Unitary authority: Cornwall
- Ceremonial county: Cornwall
- Region: South West
- Country: England
- Sovereign state: United Kingdom
- Post town: Bodmin
- Postcode district: PL30

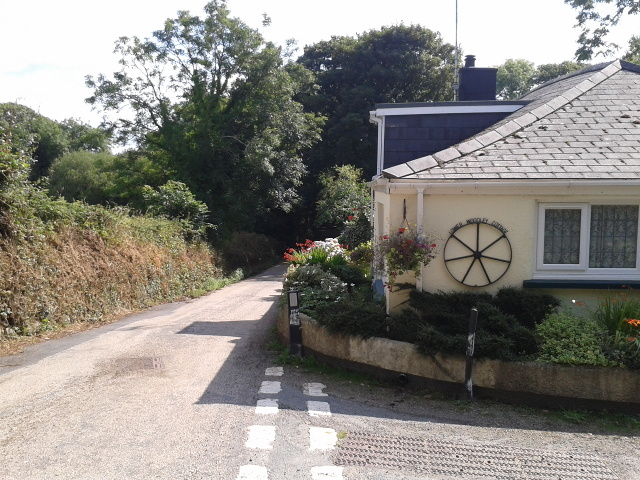
Lower Woodley, Lanivet, Cornwall, England

Lower Woodley is a hamlet in the parish of Lanivet (where the population at the 2011 census was included.), Cornwall, England. Lower Woodley is approximately 2 miles (3.2 km) south-west of Bodmin.
