= Lowertown-by-Helston =

Hamlet in Cornwall, England

Coordinates: 50.116°N 5.277°W

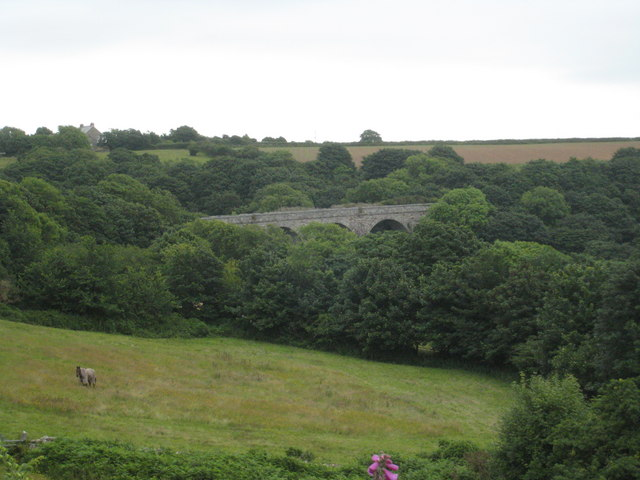
The viaduct at Lowertown

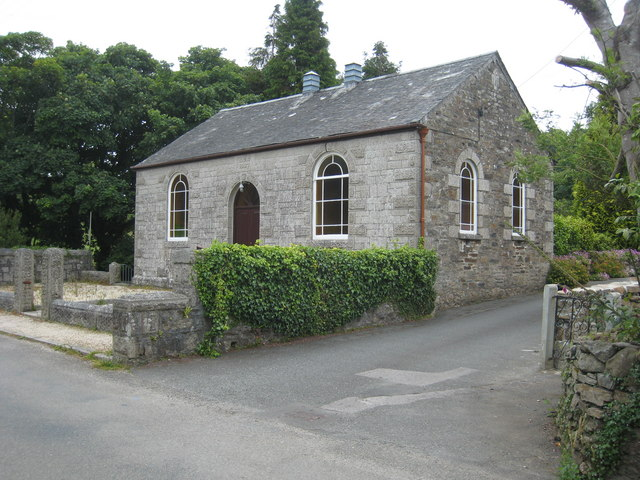
Lowertown Methodist Chapel

Lowertown-by-Helston is a large hamlet in Sithney civil parish, bordering Wendron parish, in Cornwall, United Kingdom. The hamlet is one mile north of the centre of the town of Helston, and is built around the River Cober. The hamlet used to be an industrial village, with mills, mines, railway stations, shops and churches; all of which have been closed down.

The settlement is named Lowertown on Ordnance Survey maps. The longer name is used when necessary to distinguish it from the Lowertown in Luxulyan parish.

Because Lowertown is built on the banks of the River Cober it is vulnerable to flooding. The hamlet is not known to have destructive floods but the river can overflow onto the road and path along it. The hill going down into Lowertown can also flood, but has never had a dramatic flood.

There are still remains of the mills and mines at Lowertown. The mills have been turned into houses as well as the other historic features and the old mines have now been taken away; but there are still remnants such as leats and other mine workings.

The hamlet of Gwavas is joined onto Lowertown. The Helston railway went through Lowertown and there are two bridges in the hamlet and a 90-foot viaduct.
