= Lower Common =

Village in Hampshire, England

Coordinates: 51.353101°N 0.898882°W

- Location within Hampshire
- OS grid reference: SU7677562134
- District: Hart
- Shire county: Hampshire
- Region: South East
- Country: England
- Sovereign state: United Kingdom
- Post town: HOOK
- Postcode district: RG27
- Police: Hampshire and Isle of Wight
- Fire: Hampshire and Isle of Wight
- Ambulance: South Central
- UK Parliament: North East Hampshire

Lower Common is a village in the civil parish of Eversley in the district of Hart in Hampshire, England. Its nearest town is Yateley, approximately 3.1 miles (5 km) south-east to the village.
