= Lower Clicker =

Coordinates: 50.423°N 4.411°W

- Location within Cornwall
- OS grid reference: SX288609
- Civil parish: Menheniot
- Unitary authority: Cornwall
- Ceremonial county: Cornwall
- Region: South West
- Country: England
- Sovereign state: United Kingdom
- Post town: Liskeard
- Postcode district: PL14

Lower Clicker is a hamlet in the parish of Menheniot, Cornwall, England, UK. Lower Clicker lies on the A38 road approximately 3 miles (4.8 km) south-east from Liskeard (where the 2011 census population was included.).
