= Lower Wyke =

Hamlet in Hampshire, England

Coordinates: 51.236°N 1.416°W

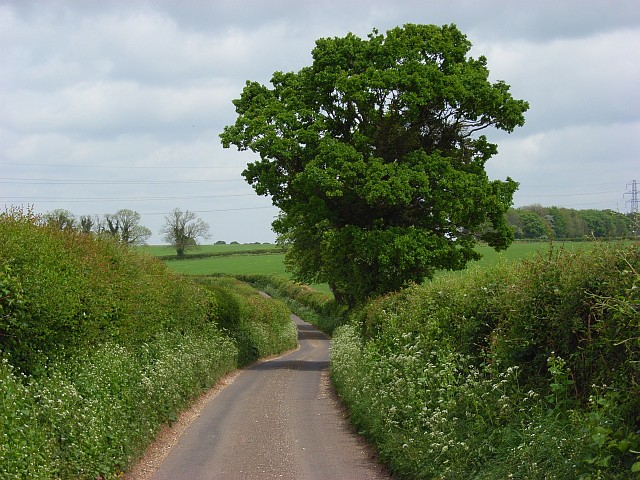
- Lane in Lower Wyke

- Location within Hampshire
- OS grid reference: SU409487
- Civil parish: St Mary Bourne
- District: Basingstoke and Deane
- Shire county: Hampshire
- Region: South East
- Country: England
- Sovereign state: United Kingdom
- Post town: ANDOVER
- Postcode district: SP11
- Dialling code: 01264
- Police: Hampshire and Isle of Wight
- Fire: Hampshire and Isle of Wight
- Ambulance: South Central
- UK Parliament: North West Hampshire

Lower Wyke is a hamlet in the Basingstoke and Deane district of Hampshire, England. It is in the civil parish of St. Mary Bourne. Its nearest town is Andover, which lies approximately 3.6 miles (5.8 km) south-east from the village.

== Governance ==
The village is part of the civil parish of St Mary Bourne and is within the Evingar ward of Basingstoke and Deane borough council. The borough council is a Non-metropolitan district of Hampshire County Council.
