= Lower Bodinnar =

Hamlet in Cornwall, England

Coordinates: 50.132°N 5.610°W

- Location within Cornwall
- OS grid reference: SW421320
- Civil parish: Sancreed
- Unitary authority: Cornwall
- Ceremonial county: Cornwall
- Region: South West
- Country: England
- Sovereign state: United Kingdom
- Post town: Penzance
- Postcode district: TR20

Lower Bodinnar is a hamlet in the parish of Sancreed (where the 2011 census population was included.), Cornwall, England, UK. Lower Bodinnar is approximately 2 miles (3.2 km) north-west of Penzance.
