= Lowertown Historic District (Lockport, New York) =

Historic district in Lockport, New York, U.S.

- U.S. National Register of Historic Places
- U.S. Historic district
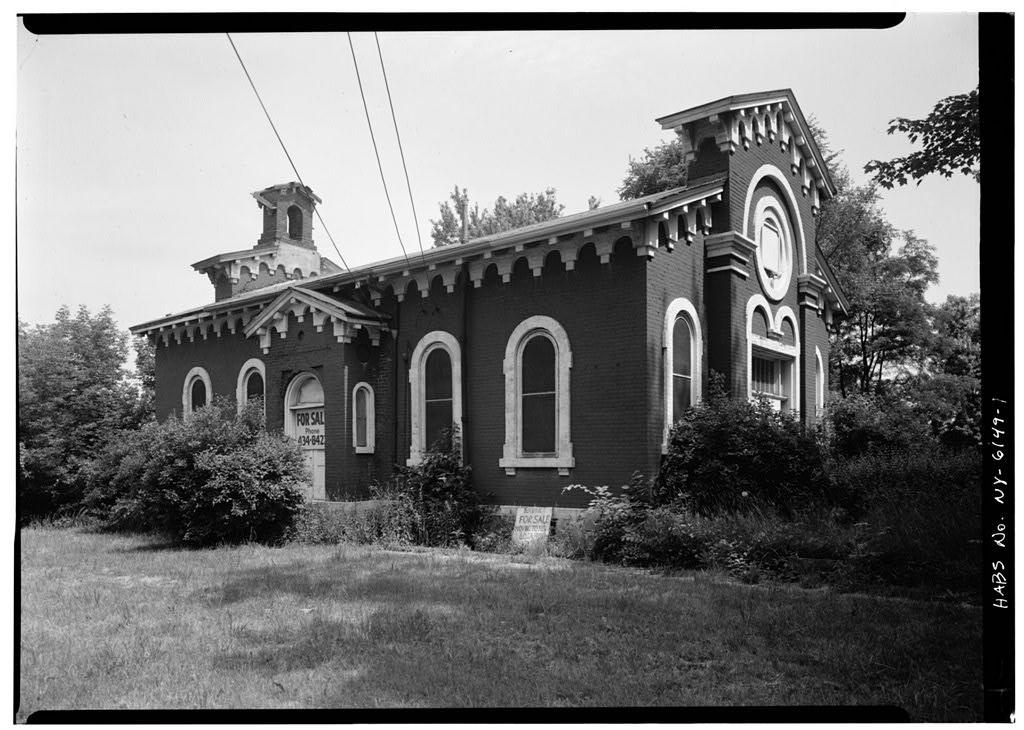
- Vine Street School, Vine & Garden Streets, Lockport, New York

- Location within New York Location within the United States
- Location: Roughly bounded by Erie Canal and New York Central RR, Lockport, New York, U.S.
- Coordinates: 43°10′47″N 78°40′42″W
- Architects: Eldredge, Hezekiah; Et al.
- Architectural style: Gothic, Italianate
- NRHP reference No.: 73001225
- Added to NRHP: June 04, 1973

Lowertown Historic District is a national historic district located at Lockport, New York, United States. The district is predominantly residential in nature, with some commercial structures and warehouses. The most elegant homes are along Market Street, east of Chapel Street, facing the Erie Canal. Notable structures in this district include the Western Block Company Warehouse, a 2 1/2-story stone structure built before 1855; Lockport Bank Building built in 1829, and located at 315-319 Market Street; Washington Hunt House, built in 1831 and home to New York Governor Washington Hunt, and located at 363 Market Street; the former Christ Episcopal Church at 425 Market Street; and the Vine Street School, an Italianate style one-room school built in 1864.

It was listed on the National Register of Historic Places in 1973.
