= Lowertown, Luxulyan =

Coordinates: 50.418°N 4.743°W

Lowertown
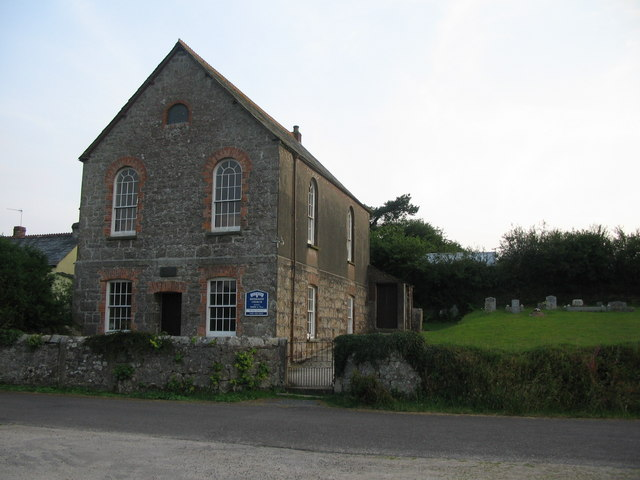
- Gunwen Methodist Church

- Location within Cornwall
- OS grid reference: SX052612
- Civil parish: Luxulyan
- Unitary authority: Cornwall
- Ceremonial county: Cornwall
- Region: South West
- Country: England
- Sovereign state: United Kingdom
- Post town: Bodmin
- Postcode district: PL30

Lowertown is a hamlet in the civil parish of Luxulyan, where the population in the 2011 census was included, in Cornwall, England. Lowertown is approximately 2 miles (3.2 km) south of Lanivet and 6 miles (9.7 km) north of St Austell.
